= Kromołów, Silesian Voivodeship =

Kromołów
- Zawiercie District
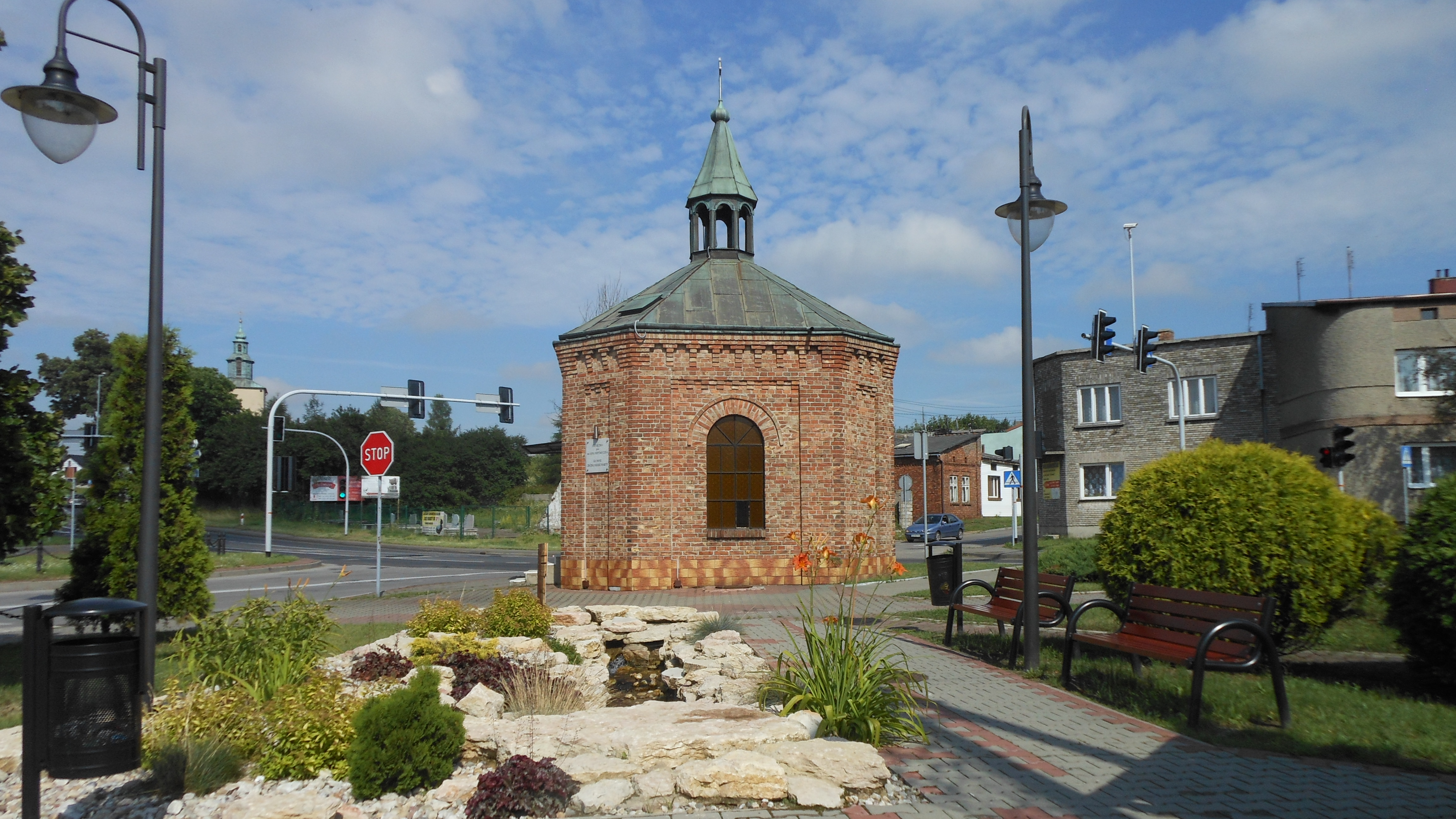
- Chapel of Saint John of Nepomucen, at the spot of the source of Warta River

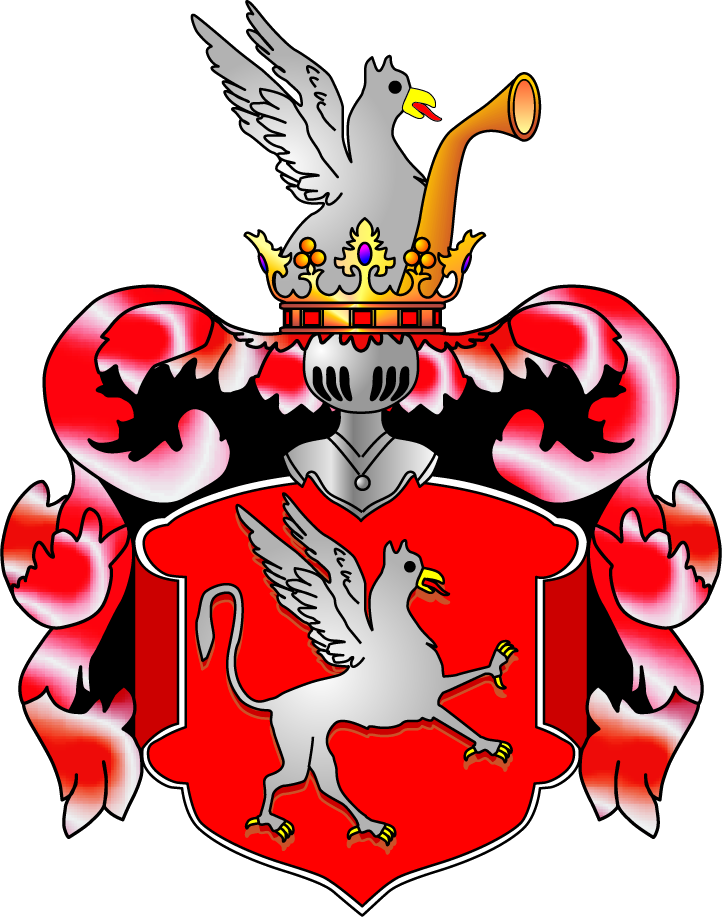
- Coat of arms

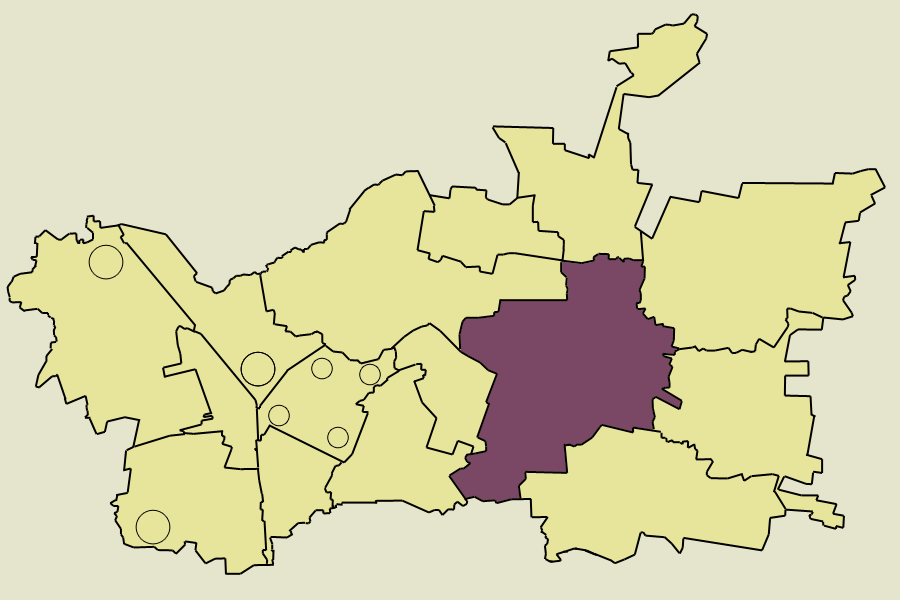
- Location of Kromołów within Zawiercie
- Coordinates: 50.4950°N 19.4936°E
- Country: Poland
- Voivodeship: Silesian
- County/City: Zawiercie County
- First mentioned: 1193
- Town rights: before 1388
- Within town limits of Zawiecie: 1977

Area
  - Total: 15.76 km^{2} (6.08 sq mi)

Population (2003)
  - Total: 3,000
  - Density: 190/km^{2} (490/sq mi)
- Time zone: UTC+1 (CET)
  - Summer (DST): UTC+2 (CEST)

Kromołów is a borough of Zawiercie, Poland, located in the east-central part of the town. It is the oldest, and most historic borough of Zawiercie, located on the Kraków-Częstochowa Upland. Formerly it was a separate town.

== History ==
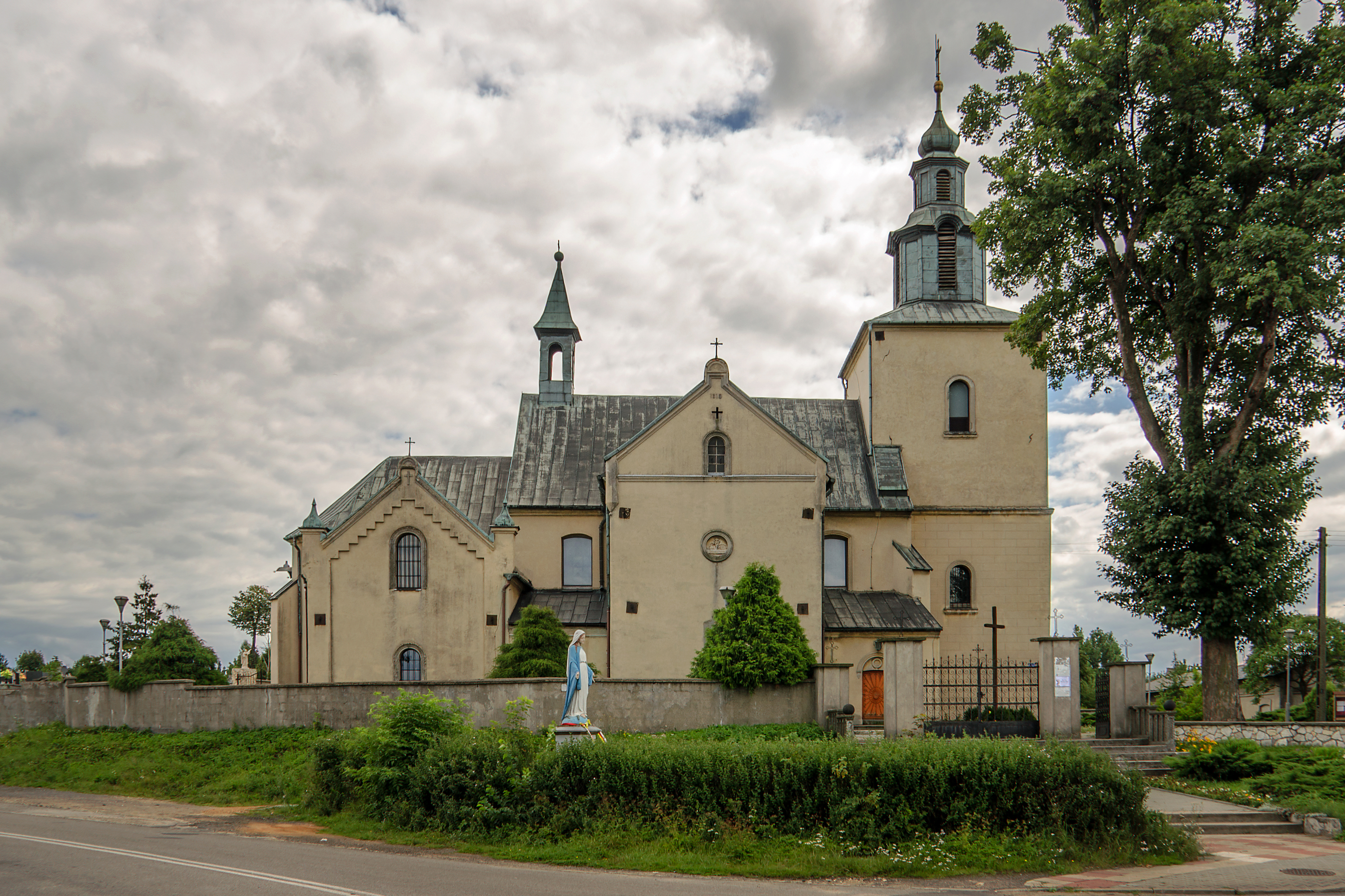
Saint Nicholas church, built in the 16th century

The hamlet of Kromołów was founded before 1193, by the knight Kromol, from which the settlement's name comes from. The first owners of this land were the Kromołowscy. Kromołów gained town rights in the 14th or 15th centuries. It was a private town, administratively located in the Lelów County, Kraków Voivodeship, Lesser Poland Province of the Kingdom of Poland.

Following the Congress of Vienna, since 1815, it was located in the Russian Partition of Poland, and was deprived of town rights as part of Russian repressions following the unsuccessful Polish January Uprising. After World War I, in 1918, Poland regained independence and control of the settlement. Following the joint German-Soviet invasion of Poland, which started World War II in September 1939, it was occupied by Germany until 1945.

In between the years of 1973 and 1977, the settlement was the headquarters of the Kromołów Gmina. On 1 February 1977, the village was incorporated into the town of Zawiercie, as one of its boroughs.
