= Millennium of the Polish State =

Polish celebrations (1960–1966)

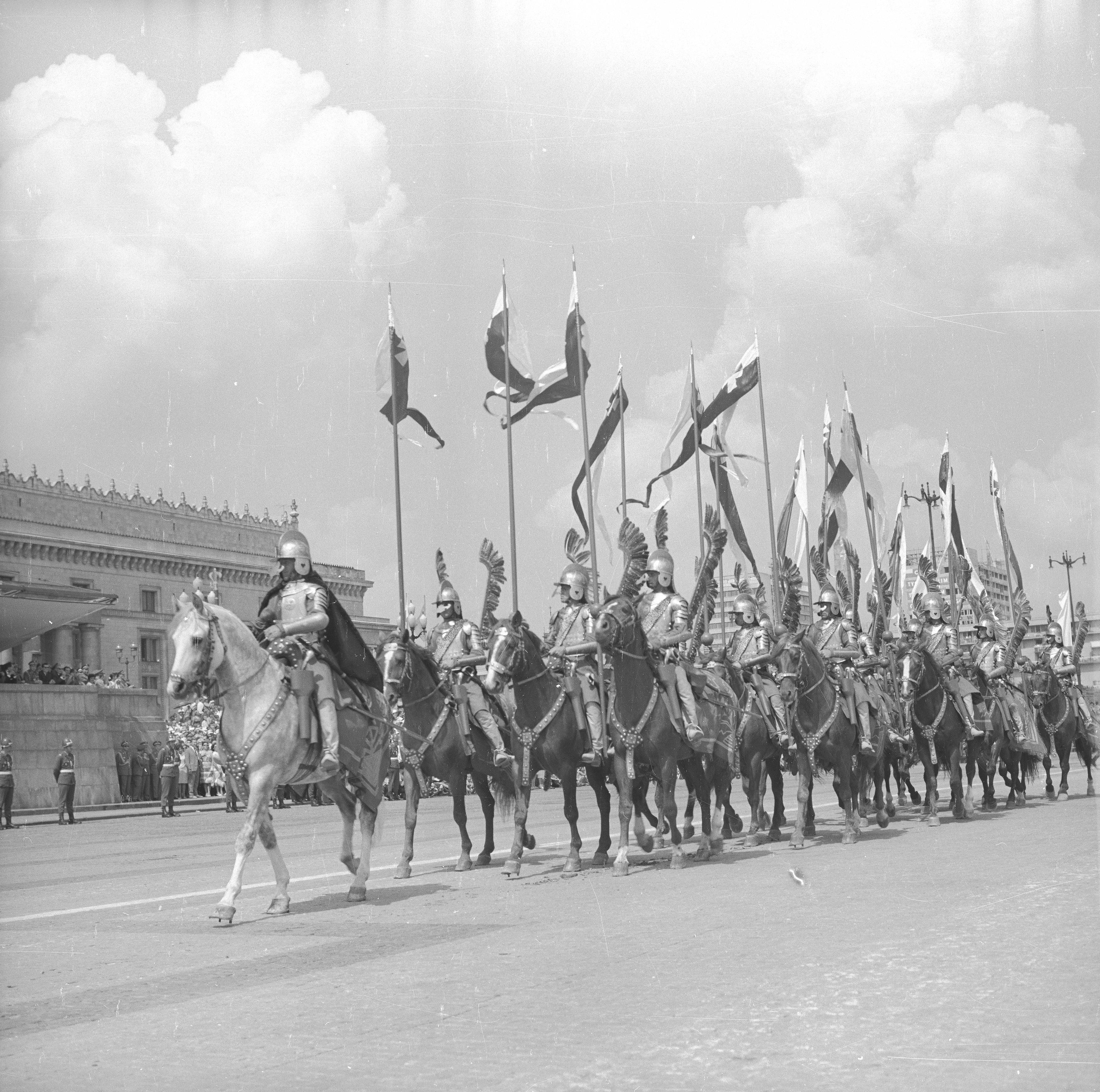
Ceremonial cavalry dressed in hussars' costumes during the parade in 1966.

The Millennium of the Polish State (Polish: Tysiąclecie Państwa Polskiego, literally A Thousand Years of the Polish State) was a national celebration of the Christianization of Poland and the subsequent establishment of the first Polish state. The celebrations took place over the years 1960–1966 by a resolution of the Sejm in 1958. The inauguration of the jubilee celebrations took place at the plenary session of the National Committee of the Unity Front on 16 February 1960 in Kalisz. The jubilee celebrations were accompanied by the educational program One thousand schools for the 1000th anniversary during which in the years 1959–1972 nearly 1.5 thousand schools were built. The anniversary presented an opportunity for propaganda by both the hierarchy of the Catholic Church and the Polish United Workers' Party. The church planned the celebration of the millennium of the "baptism" of Poland while the state authorities strictly commemorated the jubilee of the beginnings of the Polish state.

== Varying interpretations of the anniversary ==
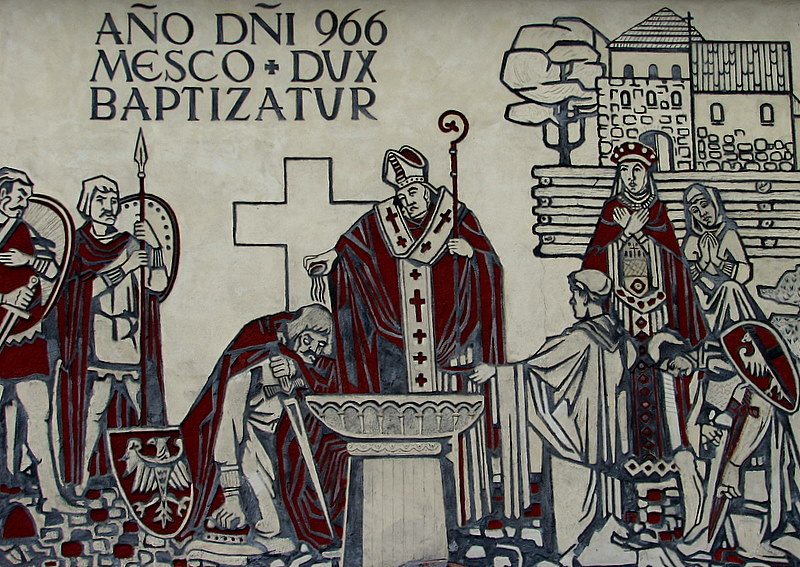
A contemporary mural in Gniezno commemorating the baptism of Poland.

The anniversary was interpreted in various ways depending on context. While most of the diaspora and the religious Catholic community celebrated the introduction of Christianity in Poland, the Communist-led government of the Polish United Workers' Party (PZPR), which pursued a state policy of atheism, sought to undermine the international celebrations by re-conveying the anniversary as an anniversary of the birth of the Polish nation. In doing so, the PZPR framed the celebrations as a secular and political anniversary instead of a religious one. This caused friction between the PRL and the Vatican, which resulted in Pope Paul VI twice being refused permission to visit Poland in 1966. As British-Polish historian Norman Davies noted, the Church and the PZPR had "rival, and mutually exclusive, interpretations of [Poland's baptism] significance."

== Commemorations ==
=== Commemorative coins ===
Commemorative coins were issued in connection with the celebrations. Their designs were prepared for a competition announced by the National Bank of Poland in 1957. As a result of the decision, it was decided the following year that the 10-złoty note designed by Józef Gosławski with the image of Mieszko I and Princess Doubravka would be minted as a 100-złoty silver commemorative coin. It became one of the most expensive coins of the Polish People's Republic and was, in the 70s, named "The Most Beautiful Polish Coin" by the Biuletyn Numizmatyczny magazine. By decree of the President of the Polish Government in Exile August Zaleski of 1 July 1966, it was decided to mint a commemorative Medal of the Millennium of Christian Poland. On 30 July 1966, the U.S. Bureau of Engraving and Printing issued over 100,000,000 commemorative stamps in honor of the millennium anniversary.

=== Tour of Cardinal Wyszyński ===
In 1966, Cardinal Primate Stefan Wyszyński traveled all over the country, visiting every region, during which he was welcomed by tens and hundreds of thousands of people. During the celebration, the authorities refused to allow Wyszyński from attending overseas celebrations. Each church in Poland posted slogans such as Sacrum Poloniae Millenium (Poland's Sacred Millennium) as well as Poloniae semper fidelis (Always loyal to Poland) and People with the Church (Naród z Kościołem). On May 15, 1966, in St. Peter's Basilica in Rome, Bishop Vladislav Rubin, a delegate from Cardinal Primate, sent papal mass in honor of the Polish Church Province. While reading a sermon in Gniezno, Cardinal Vyshinsky made this appeal: "I sincerely want you to firmly look at the past and present and, learning to love the history of this Christian people, look with open eyes at its Catholic essence".

=== Anniversary parade ===
An anniversary Millennium Parade (Defiladzie Tysiąclecia) was held on 22 July 1966 to coincide with the annual National Day of the Rebirth of Poland celebrations (set on the anniversary of the signing of the PKWN Manifesto). Like most military parades during that era, it was held in front of a grandstand near the Palace of Culture and Science on Parade Square. It was attended by Władysław Gomułka, the then First Secretary of the Polish United Workers' Party, as well as members of the PZPR and the Polish Council of State and the Sejm. The parade saw thousands of troops of the Polish People's Army's three service branches march down the square. The parade inspector was Marshal of Poland Marian Spychalski, presiding as the Minister of National Defence. The parade commander who gave its commands and directions was Major General Czesław Waryszak (1919-1979), the commander of the Warsaw Military District. Both Marshal Spychalski and General Waryszak greeted the troops on parade with a single Czołem, żołnierze! (meaning Greetings, Soldiers! in Polish), to which the troops answered Czołem, panie marszałku! (Greetings, Marshal, sir!). It featured units such as the Representative Honor Guard of the LWP and the Band of the LWP (led by Colonel Lisztok), both of which provided ceremonial honors. It uniquely featured cadets of military academies and other ceremonial units dressed in Polish historical military uniforms dating back to the Piast dynasty. Some of the eras and events represented were the Knights of Bolesław I the Brave, the Battle of Grunwald and the Polish Armed Forces in the East. The Polish Air Force also performed a flyover in the shape of a Piast Eagle. The parade is today regarded as the largest military parade in the history of Poland. It was also the culmination of all events related to the anniversary.

=== Youth rally ===
Over 25,000 Polish youth took part in a youth rally in the capital. The manifestations were sponsored by the Polish Socialist Youth Union.

=== Closing ceremony ===
The closing ceremony of the Millennium celebrations was held at the Congress of Polish Culture on 7-9 October 1966 in Warsaw, which was attended by writers, scientists and activists from all over the country.

== Places and memorials ==
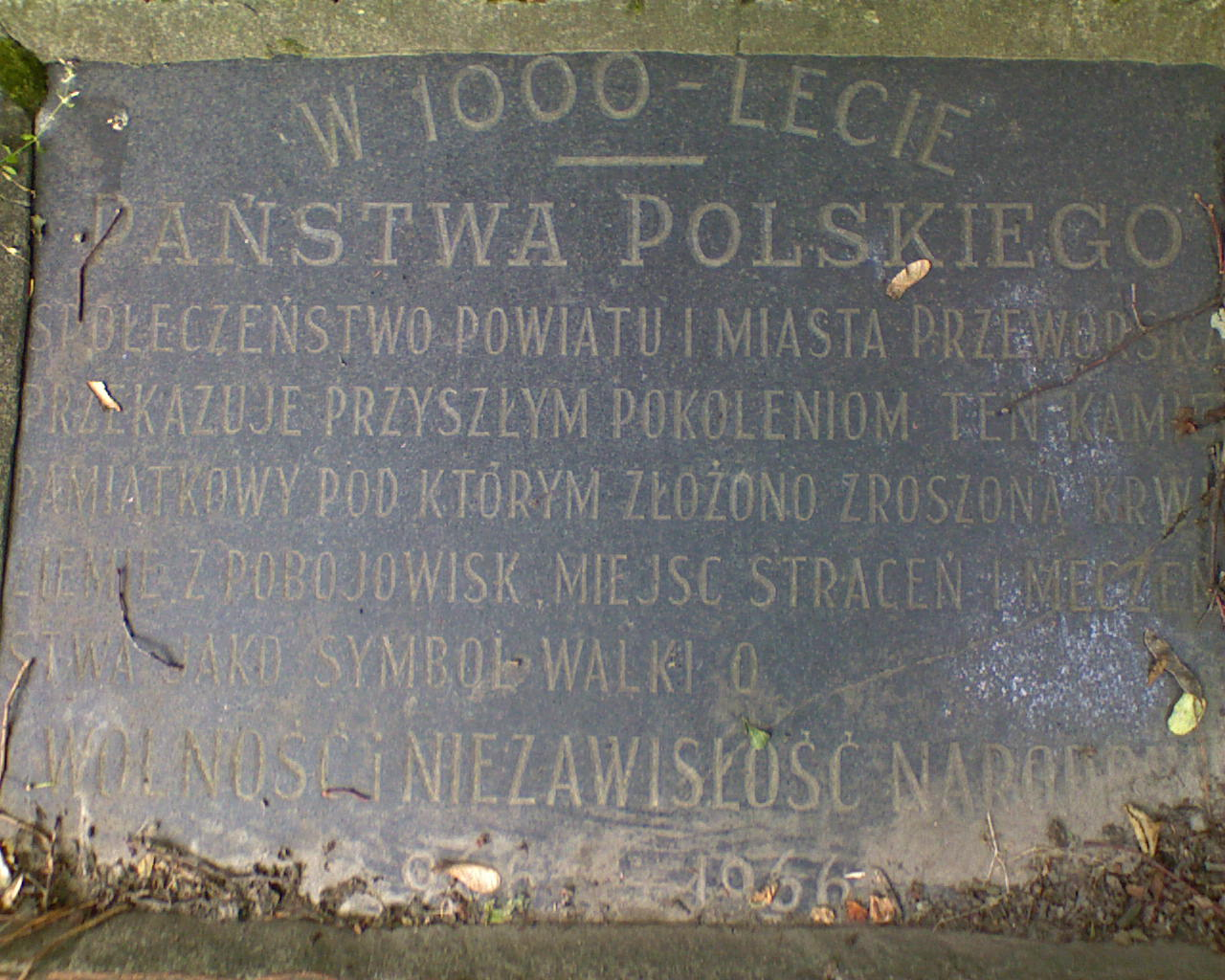
The memorial plaque

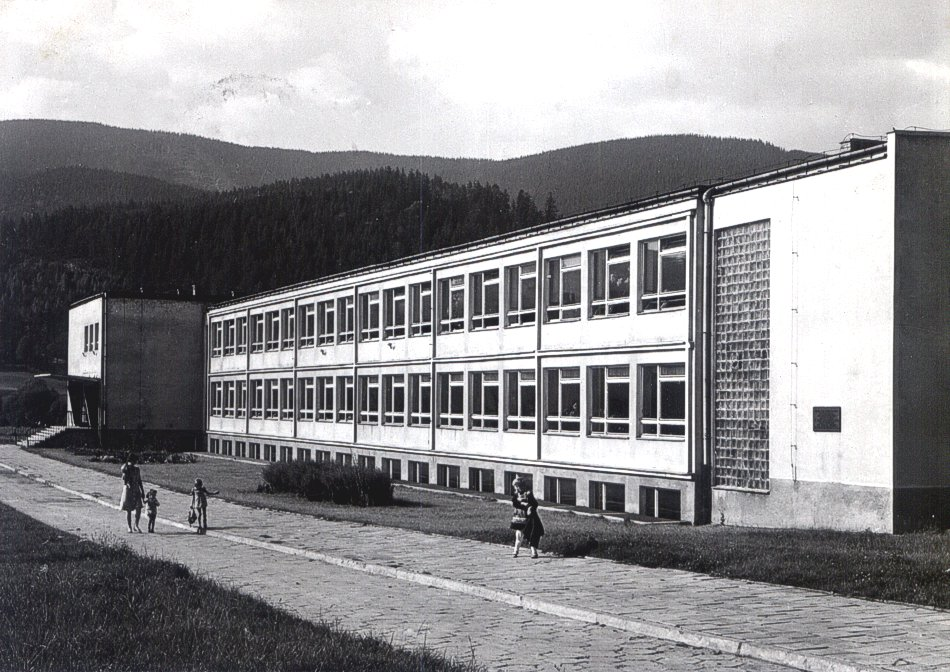
The Millennium School in Węgierska Górka (1973)

=== Parks ===
- Gopło Millennium Park
- Nadgoplański Millennium Park
- Millennium Park in Kraków
- Millennium Park in Leszno
- Millennium Park in Poznań
- Millennium Park in Sosnowiec
- Millennium Park in Toruń
- Millennium Park in Wrocław
- Millennium Park in Zielona Góra

=== Districts ===
- Osiedle Tysiąclecia, Bełchatów
- Osiedle Tysiąclecia, Biała Podlaska
- Osiedle Tysiąclecia, Białystok
- Osiedle Tysiąclecia, Dąbrowa Górnicza
- Osiedle Tysiąclecia, Gdańsk
- Osiedle Tysiąclecia, Gniezno
- Osiedle Tysiąclecia, Jastrzębie-Zdrój
- Osiedle Tysiąclecia, Katowice
- Osiedle Tysiąclecia, Koszalin
- Osiedle Tysiąclecia, Kraków
- Osiedle Tysiąclecia, Myślenice
- Osiedle Tysiąclecia, Płock
- Osiedle Tysiąclecia, Poznań
- Osiedle Tysiąclecia, Prudnik
- Osiedle Tysiąclecia, Radomsko
- Osiedle Tysiąclecia, Siedlce
- Osiedle Tysiąclecia, Stargard
- Osiedle Tysiąclecia, Zielona Góra
- 1000 Years District in Olkusz
- 1000 Years District in Poniatowa
- 1000 Years District in Rzeszów
- 1000 Years District in Tomaszów Mazowiecki
- 1000 Years District in Wejherowo
- 1000 Years District in Władysławowo
- 1000 Years District in Września

=== Streets and public spaces ===
- Aleja Tysiąclecia
- Plac Tysiąclecia, Siedlce

=== Memorials ===
- 1000th Anniversary Stone in Sanok
- 1000th Anniversary Plaque in Przeworsk

=== Buildings ===
- Millenium School
- 1000th Anniversary of the Polish State Stadium

== Awards ==
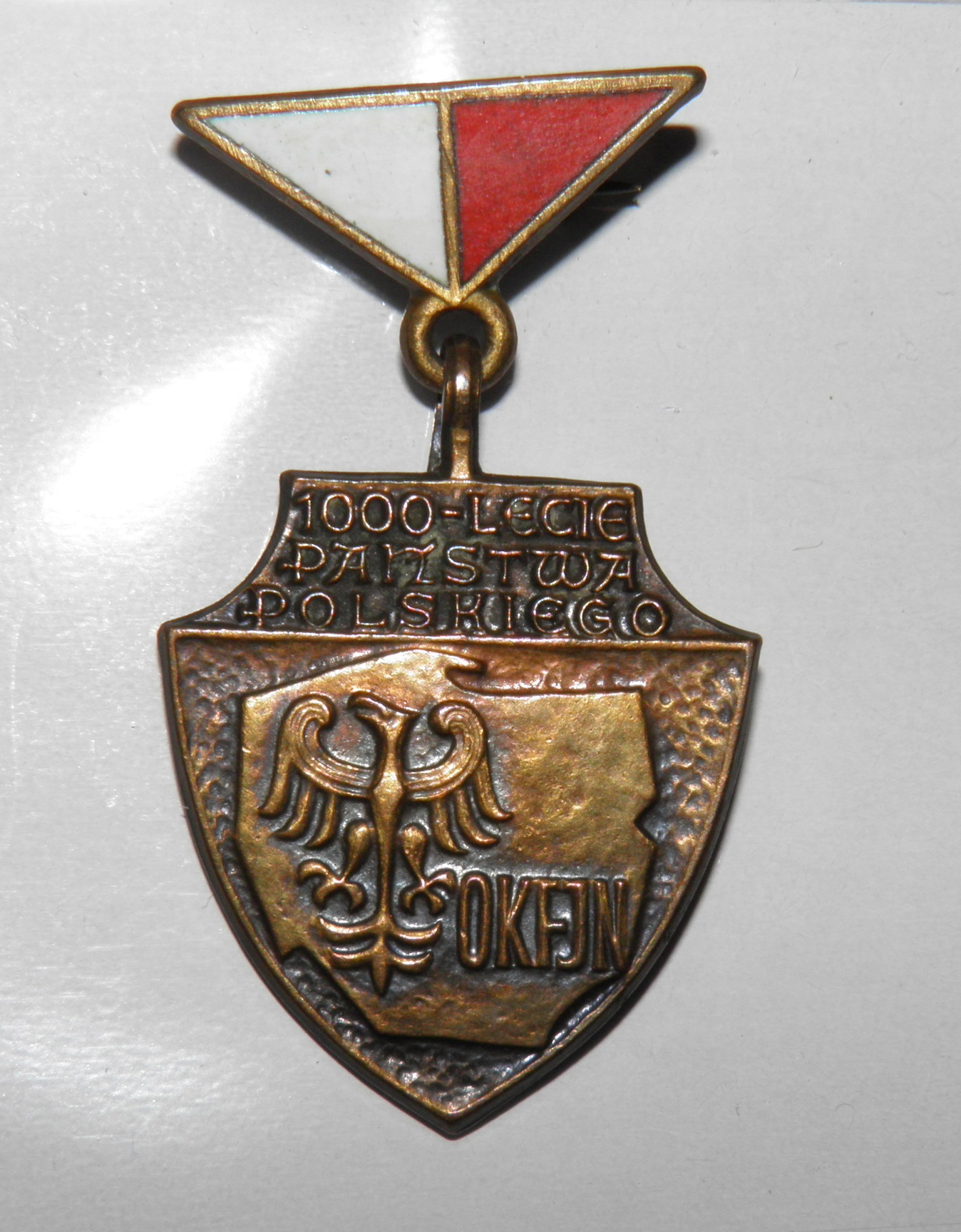
The badge

The Badge of the 1000th anniversary of the Polish State (Odznaka 1000-lecia Państwa Polskiego) was unveiled in 1960 by the National Committee of the Unity Front of the Nation to distinguish individuals or organizations for their participation in social activities in connection to the celebration of the Millennium of the Polish State.

The following individuals have been awarded with the badge:

- Elżbieta Barszczewska
- Jacek Woszczerowicz
- Wieńczysław Gliński
- Ignacy Gogolewski
- Wiesław Gołas
- Kazimierz Dejmek

== See also ==
- 1000th anniversary of the Christianization of Rus'
- 1300th Anniversary of the Bulgarian State
- Millennium celebrations
