= Bogusław Hajdas =

Polish footballer and coach

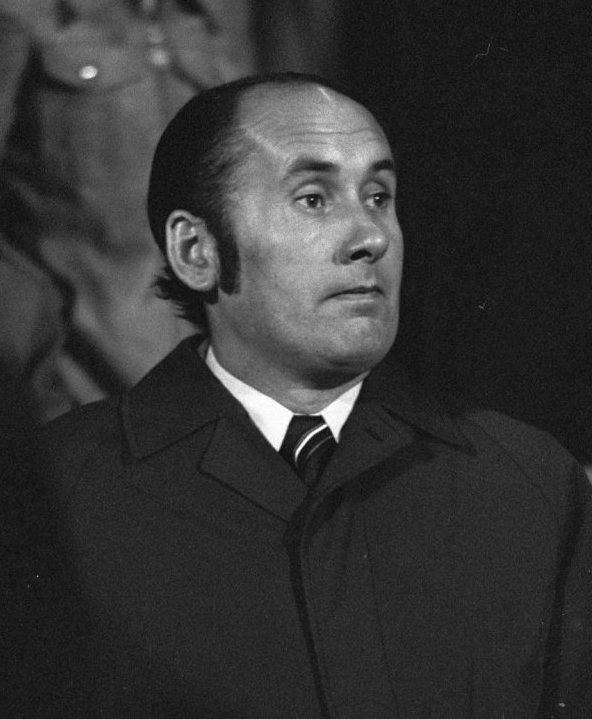
- Bogusław Hajdas in 1974

Personal information
- Date of birth: 21 July 1939 (age 87)
- Place of birth: Kraków, Poland
- Position: Defender

Senior career*
Years	Team	Apps	(Gls)
- Warta Zawiercie
1961–1963	Lotnik Warsaw		
1963–1967	AZS-AWF Warsaw		

Managerial career
- Warta Zawiercie
- AZS-AWF Warsaw
- 1973–1975: Gwardia Warsaw
- 1975–1977: Pogoń Szczecin
- 1977–1981: Gwardia Warsaw
- 1983–1985: KuPS
- 1987–1989: Poland U21
- 1989: Wisła Kraków
- 1991–1992: VPS
- 1993: Hutnik Kraków
- 1993–1995: VPS
- 1996–1997: Legionovia Legionowo
- 1997: Raków Częstochowa
- 1998: Hutnik Kraków
- 1999: Gwardia Warsaw
- 2000–2004: SEMP Ursynów
- 2005–2006: Gwardia Warsaw
- * Club domestic league appearances and goals

Bogusław Hajdas (born 21 July 1939) is a Polish former professional footballer and manager.

== Playing career ==
Hajdas played for Warta Zawiercie, Lotnik Warsaw and AZS-AWF Warsaw.

== Coaching career ==
Hajdas managed Gwardia Warsaw, Pogoń Szczecin, KuPS, Poland U21, Wisła Kraków, VPS, Hutnik Kraków and Raków Częstochowa.

== Honours ==
Individual

- Polish Coach of the Year: 1977
