= Warta Zawiercie =

Warta Zawiercie can refer to:

- Warta Zawiercie (football)
- Warta Zawiercie (volleyball)
