= Czchów Castle =

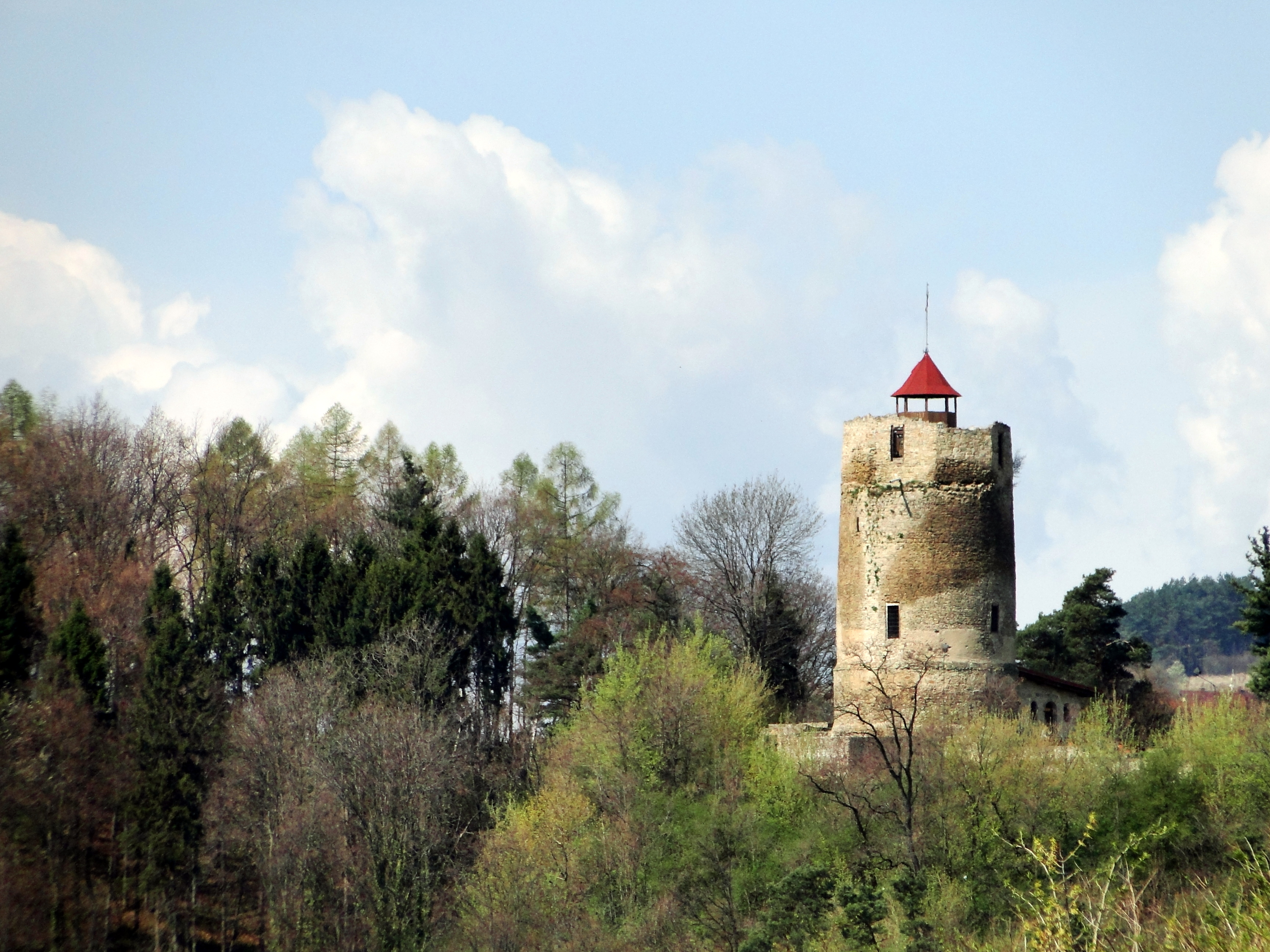
- Czchów Castle

- Location of the Czchów Castle in Poland
- 49°49′59″N 20°40′38″E
- Location: Czchów, Lesser Poland Voivodeship, in Poland

History
- Built: 13-14th century

Site notes
- Architectural style: Romanesque

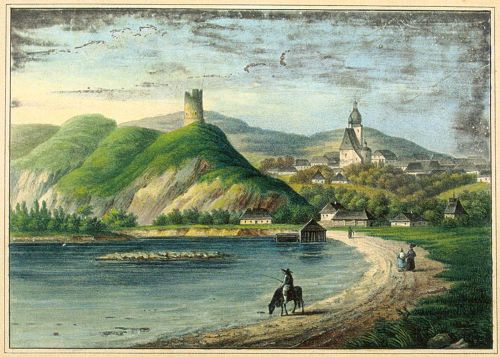
The castle in a drawing by Adam Gorczyński (ca. 1837)

Czchów Castle - Romanesque castle ruins located in Czchów, located on a hill known as the Keep on the Dunajec (Baszta nad Dunajcem) in Brzesko County, Lesser Poland Voivodeship in Poland.

In the sixteenth-century, the sandstone-built royal castle was located in the Kraków Voivodeship.

== See also ==
- Czchów
- Dunajec river castles
- Castles in Poland
