= Szczyrzyc Abbey =

Abbey in Szczyrzyc, Poland

- Opactwo Cystersów w Szczyrzycu
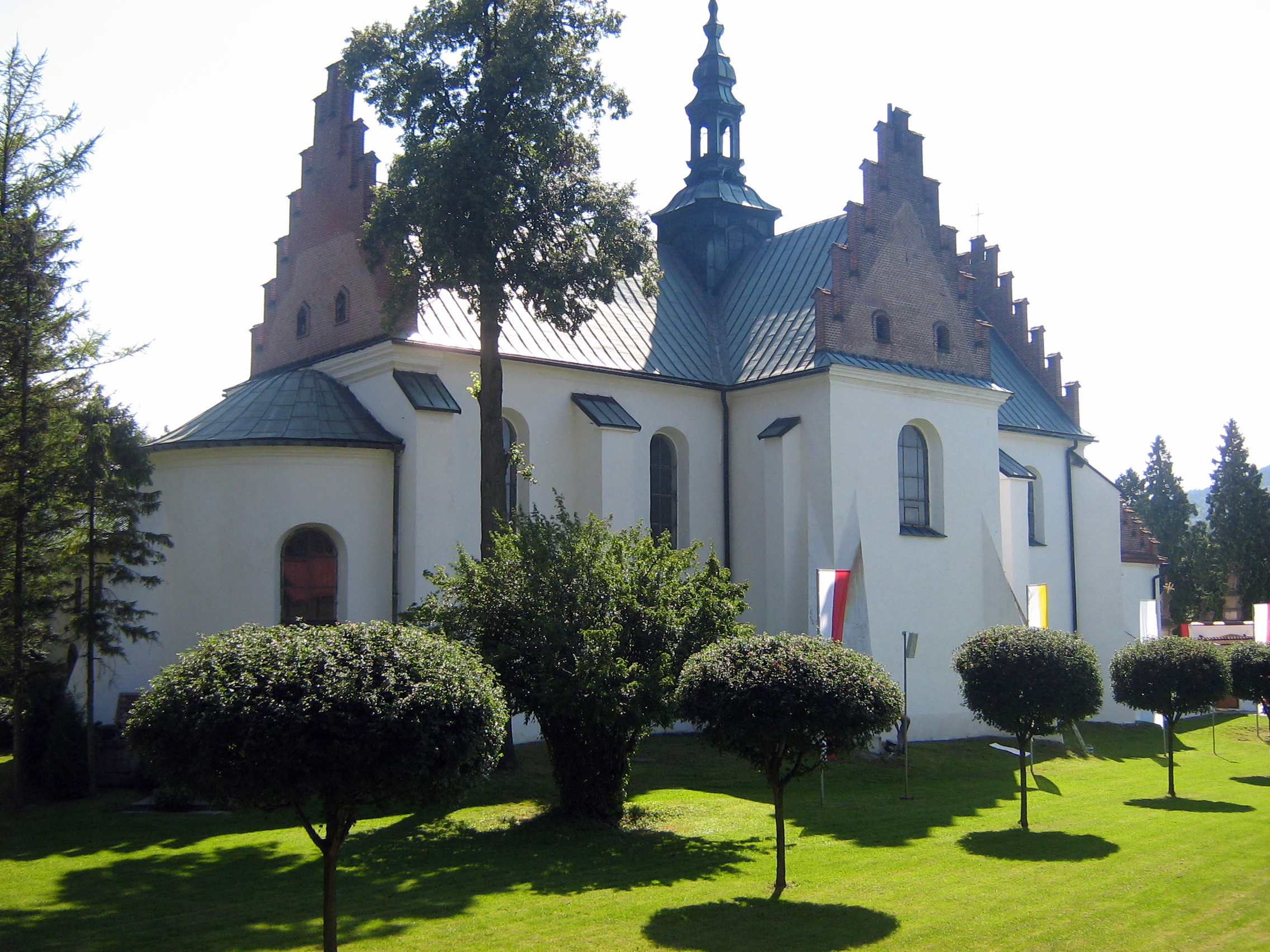
- Church of the Assumption of Mary and Saint Stanislaus

- Location within Poland

Monastery information
- Order: Cistercians
- Established: 1234

People
- Founder: Teodor Gryfita

Architecture
- Style: Gothic-Baroque

Site
- Location: Szczyrzyc
- Country: Poland
- Coordinates: 49°47′06″N 20°11′13″E

Szczyrzyc Abbey (Polish: Opactwo Cystersów w Szczyrzycu) is a Cistercian abbey founded in 1234 in the village of Szczyrzyc, Poland. It continues to function as a monastery and is one of the Polish Shrines to the Virgin Mary.

It is one of four Cistercian Abbeys in Poland, the others being in Jędrzejów, Wąchock and Mogiła.

Apart from its religious role, the abbey contains the Museum of the Cistercian Abbey.

The building also works to support the environment of several endangered bats, including the greater mouse-eared bat, which live in the loft space.

In 2026, it is planned to build a memorial to the church organ builder Tomasza Hall at the Abbey.
