= Widawka =

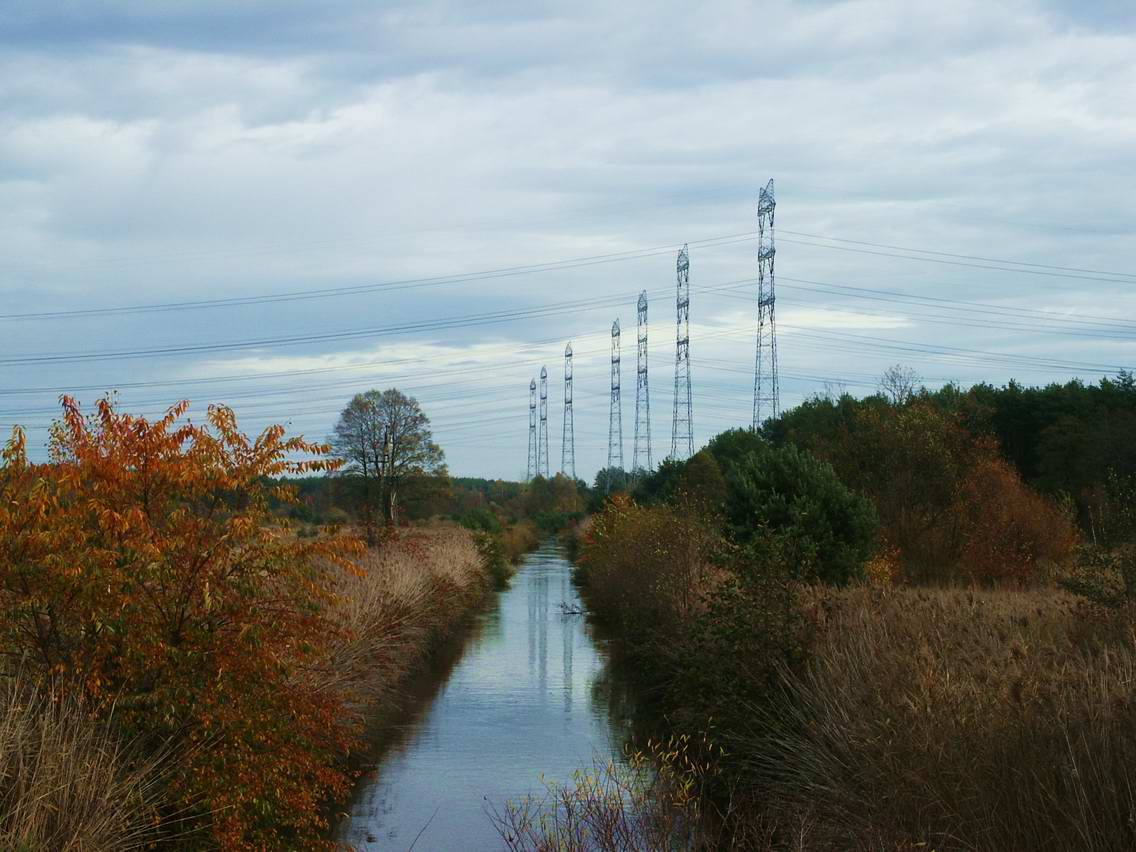

Physical characteristics
- Mouth
  - location: Warta
  - coordinates: 51°30′34″N 18°52′07″E
- Length: 96 km (60 mi)
- Basin size: 2,385 km^{2} (921 sq mi)

Basin features
- Progression: Warta→ Oder→ Baltic Sea

The Widawka is a river, located in central Poland (Łódź Voivodeship, near Bełchatów), a right tributary of the Warta. Its length is 95.8 kilometers and its basin's area is 2385 km^{2}.

== See also ==
- Rivers of Poland
