= Czchów =

Town in Lesser Poland Voivodeship, Poland

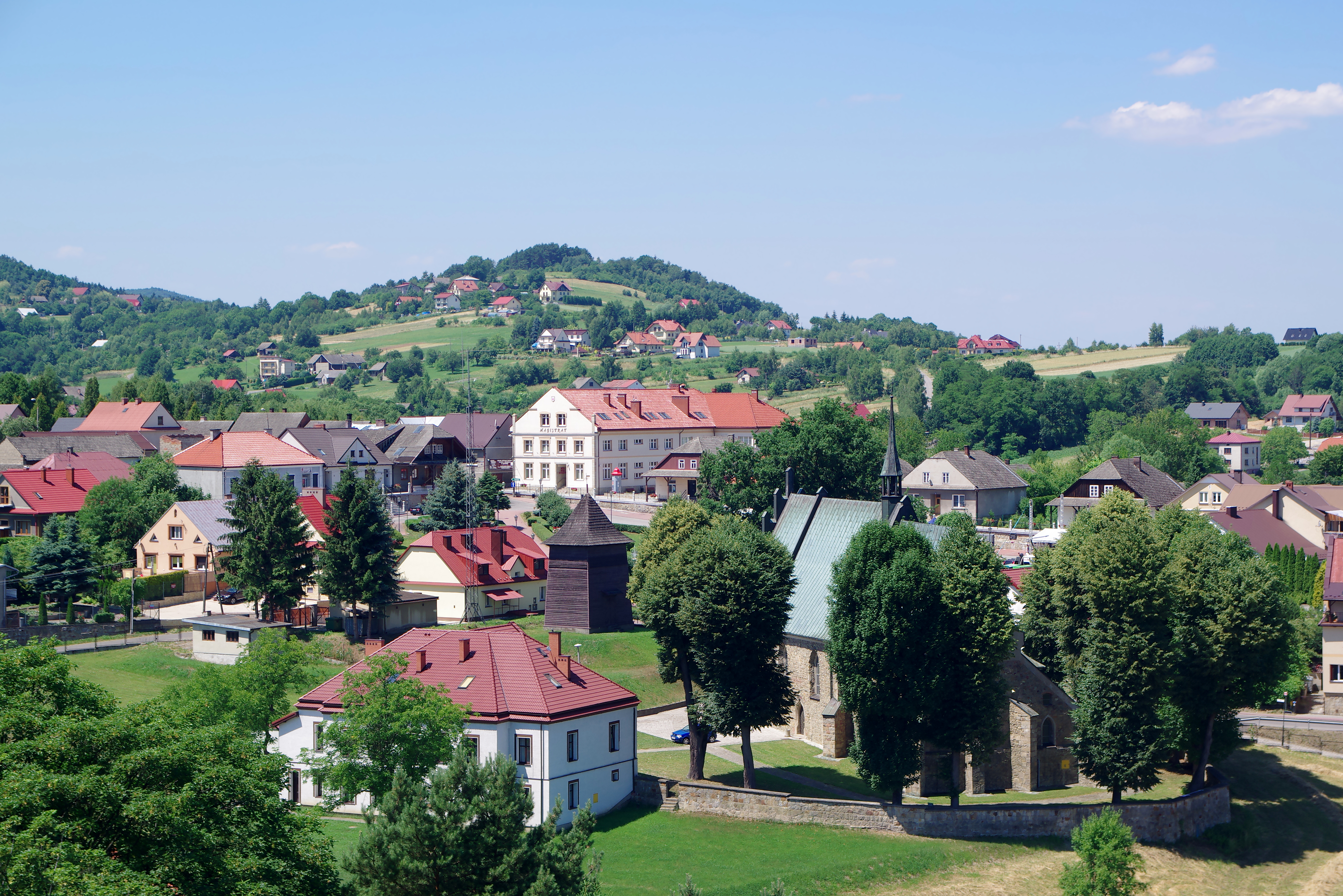
- View of Czchów

- Coat of arms

- Location within Poland
- Coordinates: 49°51′N 20°41′E
- Country: Poland
- Voivodeship: Lesser Poland
- County: Brzesko
- Gmina: Czchów

Government
  - Mayor: Kamil Grzyb (PB)

Area
  - Total: 14.08 km^{2} (5.44 sq mi)

Population (31 December 2021)
  - Total: 2,288
  - Density: 162.5/km^{2} (420.9/sq mi)
- Time zone: UTC+1 (CET)
  - Summer (DST): UTC+2 (CEST)
- Postal code: 32-860
- Area code: +48 14
- Car plates: KBR
- Website: http://www.czchow.pl

Czchów [t͡ʂxuf] (Yiddish: טשיכוב-Chekhoiv) is a town in Brzesko County, Lesser Poland Voivodeship, in southern Poland, with 2,288 inhabitants as of December 2021. It lies on the Dunajec river, and along National Road Nr. 75.

== History ==
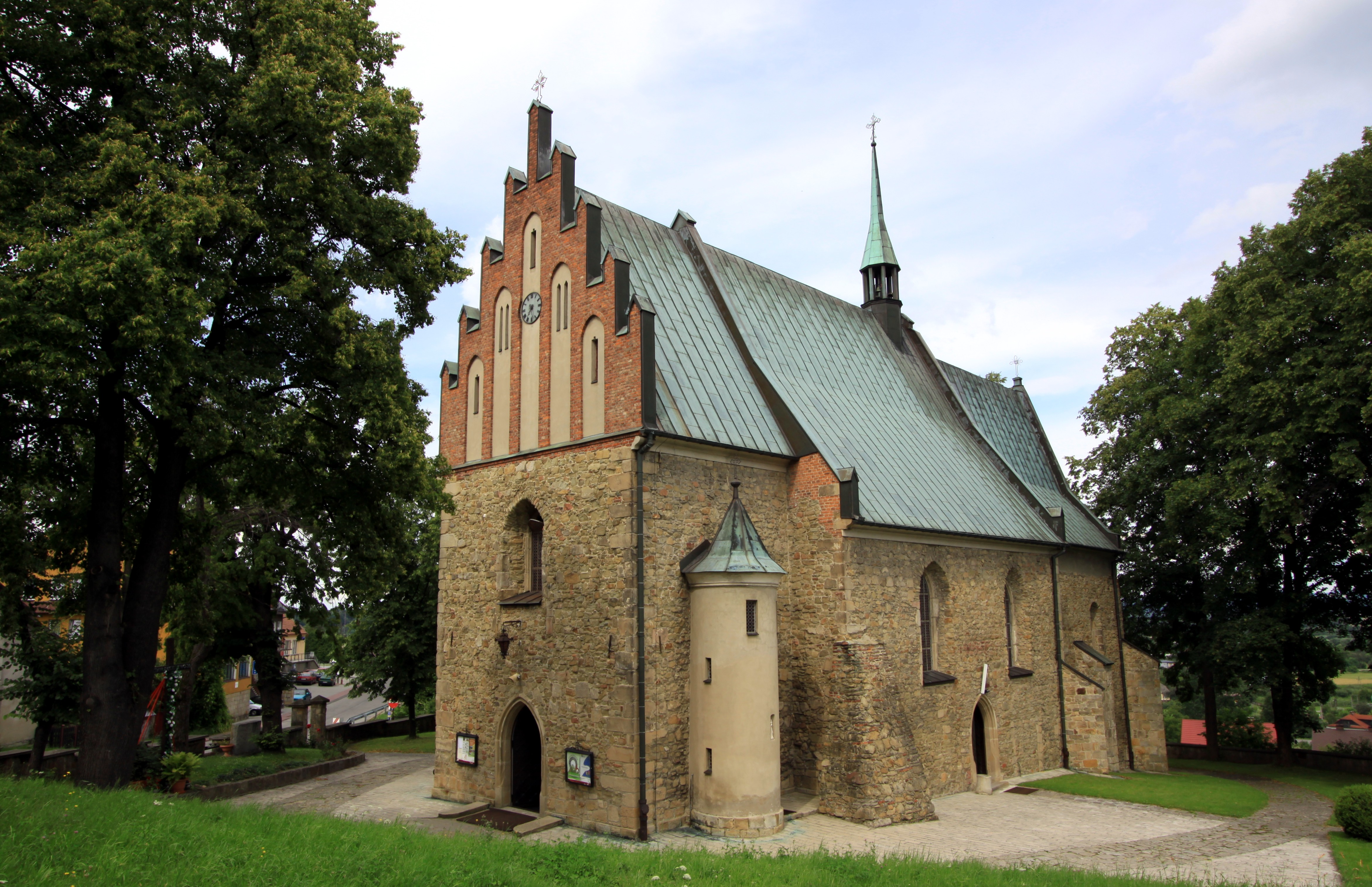
Medieval Gothic Church of the Nativity of the Virgin Mary

The history of Czchów dates back to the time when this part of Poland probably belonged to Great Moravia. Some sources claim that the very name of the town is of Czech origin, as in the documents from the 13th century, it was spelled Czechou, Cechou, and Cehiov. According to Jan Długosz, among first residents of the settlements were Germans, captured by King Bolesław Chrobry during the Polish–German Wars of 1003–1018. In 1280, Princess Kinga of Poland met here with Prince of Kraków, Leszek Czarny to discuss a conflict among Piast princes. At that time the village of Czchów belonged to the Bishops of Kraków, and at the beginning of the 14th century, it became a royal possession. During the reign of King Casimir III the Great, Czchów was surrounded by a defensive wall, and on November 24, 1355, it received Magdeburg rights. On a surrounding hill the Czchów Castle was built, to protect a merchant route along the Dunajec river towards Kingdom of Hungary, and a custom house. The castle was based on an earlier, Romanesque watchtower.

By 1357, Czchów already was the seat of a castellan, a starosta, and of a county, located in Lesser Poland’s Kraków Voivodeship. Here, local szlachta met for their councils (see sejmik), and the town was a location of a court. In 1433, Czchów received a privilege to organize a fair, and in 1565, King Sigismund II Augustus marked Czchów as the location of permanent border fairs. The town was conveniently located along a Dunajec river merchant route to Kingdom of Bohemia and Kingdom of Hungary. Czchów was an important urban center, which in 1545 got its own waterworks and sewage system. In the 16th century, Czchów was one of centers of Protestant Reformation, here Fausto Sozzini lived for a few years.

The period of prosperity ended in the mid-17th century. Old merchant route along the Dunajec was replaced with new routes, the river frequently flooded the town, and the area was devastated in the Swedish invasion of Poland. In 1662 the population of Czchów was reduced to only 500, and in 1690, after a disastrous flood, only 36 houses remained. The castle lost its military importance, and was turned into a prison. After the First Partition of Poland (1772), Czchów became part of Austrian province of Galicia, where it remained until 1918. The decline was so severe, that in 1928, the government of the Second Polish Republic reduced it to the status of a village. Following the German-Soviet invasion of Poland, which started World War II in September 1939, the town was occupied by Germany.

== Tourism ==
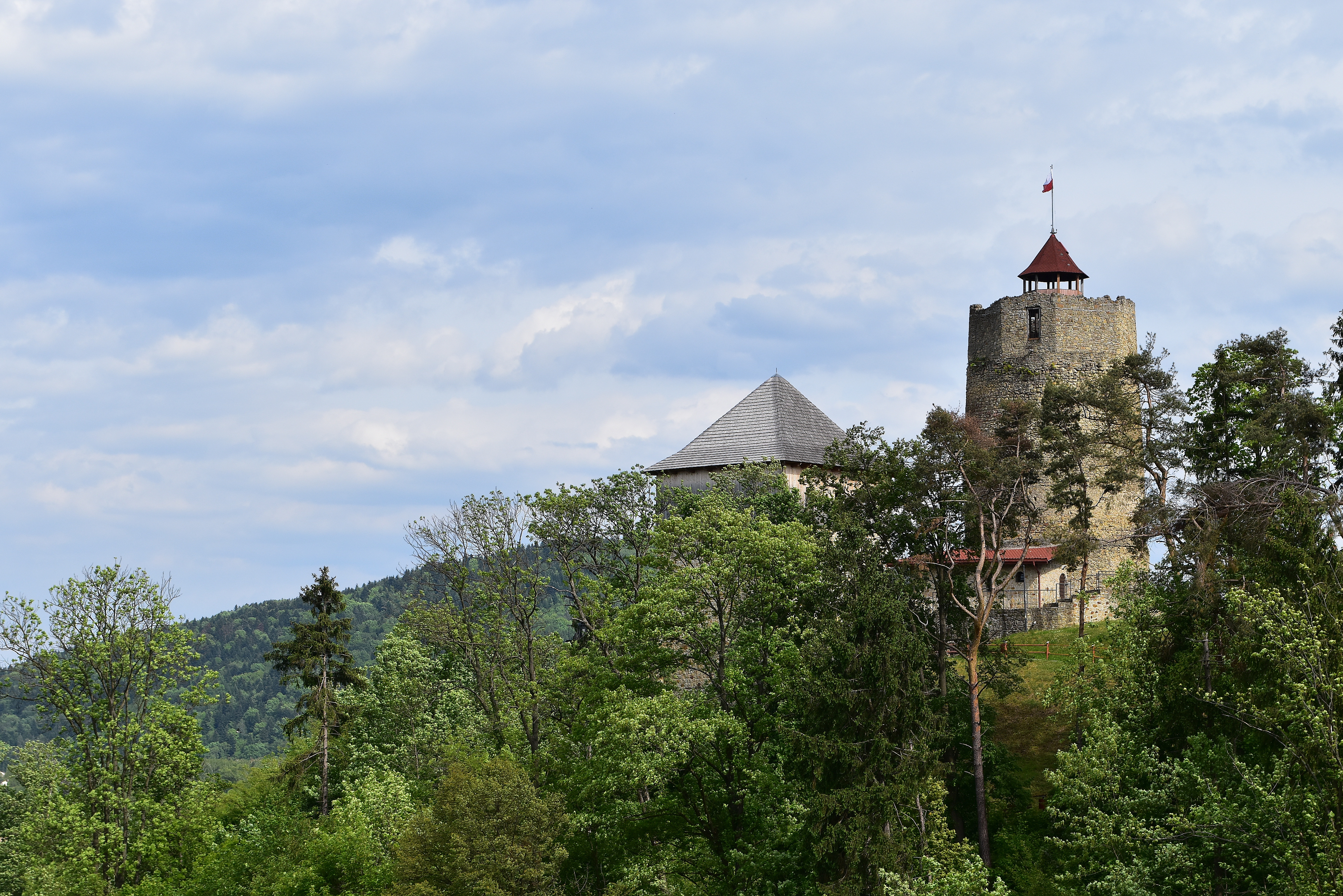
Czchów Castle

Among points of interest there are:

- Gothic parish church (1346),
- Baroque chapel (18th century),
- ruins of the Czchów Castle,
- market square with historic houses,
- numerous manor houses in the area of the town,
- Tropsztyn Castle, located 6 kilometres (3.7 miles) south of Czchów.
