= Kraków Voivodeship (14th century – 1795) =

Former province in the Kingdom of Poland (14th century – 1795)

Coordinates: 50°03′41″N 19°56′18″E

Kraków Voivodeship Palatinatus Cracoviensis Województwo Krakowskie
- Voivodeship of Poland
- 1300–1795
- Coat of arms

- Kraków Voivodeship in the Polish–Lithuanian Commonwealth in 1635.
- Capital: Kraków
- Area
  - 1606: 10,000 km^{2} (3,900 sq mi)
- Population
  - 1606: 320,000
- History
  - Established: 5 January 1300
  - First partition: August 5, 1772
  - Third partition: 24 October 1795
- Political subdivisions: counties: 7 (as for 1662)
Preceded by
Duchy of Kraków	Seniorate Province
Succeeded by
Kingdom of Galicia and Lodomeria
New Galicia
New Silesia

The Kraków Voivodeship (Polish: Województwo Krakowskie, Latin: Palatinatus Cracoviensis) was a voivodeship (province) in the Kingdom of Poland from the 14th century to the partition of Poland in 1795 (see History of Poland during the Piast dynasty, Kingdom of Poland (1385–1569), and Polish–Lithuanian Commonwealth). Located in the southwestern corner of the country, it was part of the Lesser Poland region (together with two other voivodeships of Poland: Sandomierz Voivodeship, and Lublin Voivodeship) and the Lesser Poland Province.

== History ==
Kraków Voivodeship emerged from the Duchy of Kraków, which was created as Seniorate Province in the Testament of Bolesław III Krzywousty (1138). According to Zygmunt Gloger, it was one of the richest provinces of the Kingdom of Poland, with salt mines in Bochnia and Wieliczka, silver and lead mines in Olkusz, and very fertile soil around Proszowice. Its boundaries changed little for centuries. In 1457, the Duchy of Oświęcim was incorporated into the voivodeship, in 1564 – the Duchy of Zator (the Silesian County was created out of the two), and in 1790, the Duchy of Siewierz. Among cities and towns of contemporary Poland, which were part of Kraków Voivodeship, are Będzin, Biała, Bochnia, Brzesko, Częstochowa, Dąbrowa Górnicza, Jasło, Jaworzno, Jędrzejów, Krzepice, Kłobuck, Miechów, Nowy Sącz, Nowy Targ, Oświęcim, Sosnowiec, Szczekociny, Zakopane, Zator, Zawiercie, and Żywiec. In the first partition of Poland, in 1772 Habsburg monarchy annexed southern half of the voivodeship (south of the Vistula). In 1795, the third and final partition of Poland, Austria annexed the remaining part of the province, with the exception of its northwestern corner (around Częstochowa), which was seized by the Kingdom of Prussia, as New Silesia.

Zygmunt Gloger in his monumental book Historical Geography of the Lands of Old Poland gives a detailed description of Kraków Voivodeship:

Kraków Voivodeship covered Subcarpathian Lechia on the right bank of the Vistula, as well as land on the left bank of the river, between Kraków and Sieradz, where the Warta and the Pilica have their sources. Little is known about early history of southern areas of this province, and our knowledge is based on legends. We know that there was a prince named Krakus or Krak, after whom the city of Kraków was named (...) Local tribes, which remained pagan, were separated from the world by the Carpathians, so there are no documents about their origins (...) During the reign of Duke Mieszko I, the Bohemia state reached as far as Kraków, which was annexed by Bolesław Chrobry in 999 (...)

In 1138, following the Testament of Bolesław III Krzywousty, the Duchy of Kraków was granted to Wladyslaw, the eldest son of Krzywousty. Boundaries of the duchy were most likely the same as boundaries of Kraków Voivodeship. In 1397, three counties were created: Kraków, Proszowice and Zarnowiec. In the 16th century, there were seven counties in the voivodeship: Proszowice, Szczyrzyc, Lelów, Książ Wielki, Silesian, Biecz and Nowy Sącz (...)

Boundaries of Kraków Voivodeship were as follows: in the north it partly went along the Liswarta river, crossing the Pilica between Koniecpol and Lelów. The towns of Secemin, Sobków, Pińczów, Opatowiec, Szczurowa, Wojnicz, Tuchów, Brzostek, Kołaczyce and Jedlicze belonged to Sandomierz Voivodeship, while Lelów, Jędrzejów, Działoszyce, Skalbmierz, Koszyce, Szczepanów, Zakliczyn, Jodłowa, Jasło, Dukla and Jaśliska were part of Kraków Voivodeship. Southern border was marked by the mountains, beyond which lies Spis (...) In the west, Kraków Voivodeship included three Silesian duchies, namely Duchy of Oświęcim (since 1457), Duchy of Zator (since 1494) and Duchy of Siewierz (since 1443) (...)

In the 16th century, Kraków Voivodeship had the area of 3,451 square miles, with 466 Roman-Catholic parishes, 71 towns and cities, and 2,206 villages (...) It had seven senators: the Bishop of Kraków, the Castellan of Kraków, the Voivode of Kraków, the Castellan of Wojnicz, and Castellans of Nowy Sącz, Biecz and Oświęcim. Starostas resided in such locations, as Kraków, Sacz, Biecz, Spisz, Badzyn, Czchow, Czorsztyn, Dębowiec, Dobczyce, Grybów, Jadowniki, Jodłowa, Jasło, Krzeczow, Lanckorona, Lelów, Libiąż, Mszana Dolna, Nowy Targ, Olsztyn, Ojców, Rabsztyn, Wolbrom, and others. Local sejmik took place at Proszowice, where eight deputies were elected to the Sejm and Lesser Poland Tribunal in Lublin (...)

The Duchies of Oświęcim and Zator had their own sejmik at Zator, electing two deputies. These two Duchies had 160 villages, and six towns (Oświęcim, Zator, Żywiec, Kęty, Wadowice and Berwald). The Duchy of Siewierz, which belonged to Bishops of Kraków, had two towns (Siewierz and Sławków) (...) Kraków Voivodeship was regarded as the richest part of the Kingdom of Poland. It was the favourite province of King Kazimierz Wielki, and during the reign of the Jagiellon dynasty, a great number of palaces and castles was built here. Kraków Voivodeship had plenty of old churches, chapels, tombs, and other historical buildings (...) Among popular places there were Cistercial Abbey at Mogila near Kraków, Benedictine Abbey at Tyniec, Jasna Góra Monastery at Częstochowa, Franciscan church and abbey at Stary Sącz. Among major castles were Tenczyn Castle, Lipowiec Castle, Siewierz Castle, Smolen Castle, Bobolice Castle, Czorsztyn Castle, Olsztyn Castle, Ojców Castle, Pieskowa Skała Castle, Wojnicz Castle, Stará Ľubovňa Castle and others.

== Seats ==
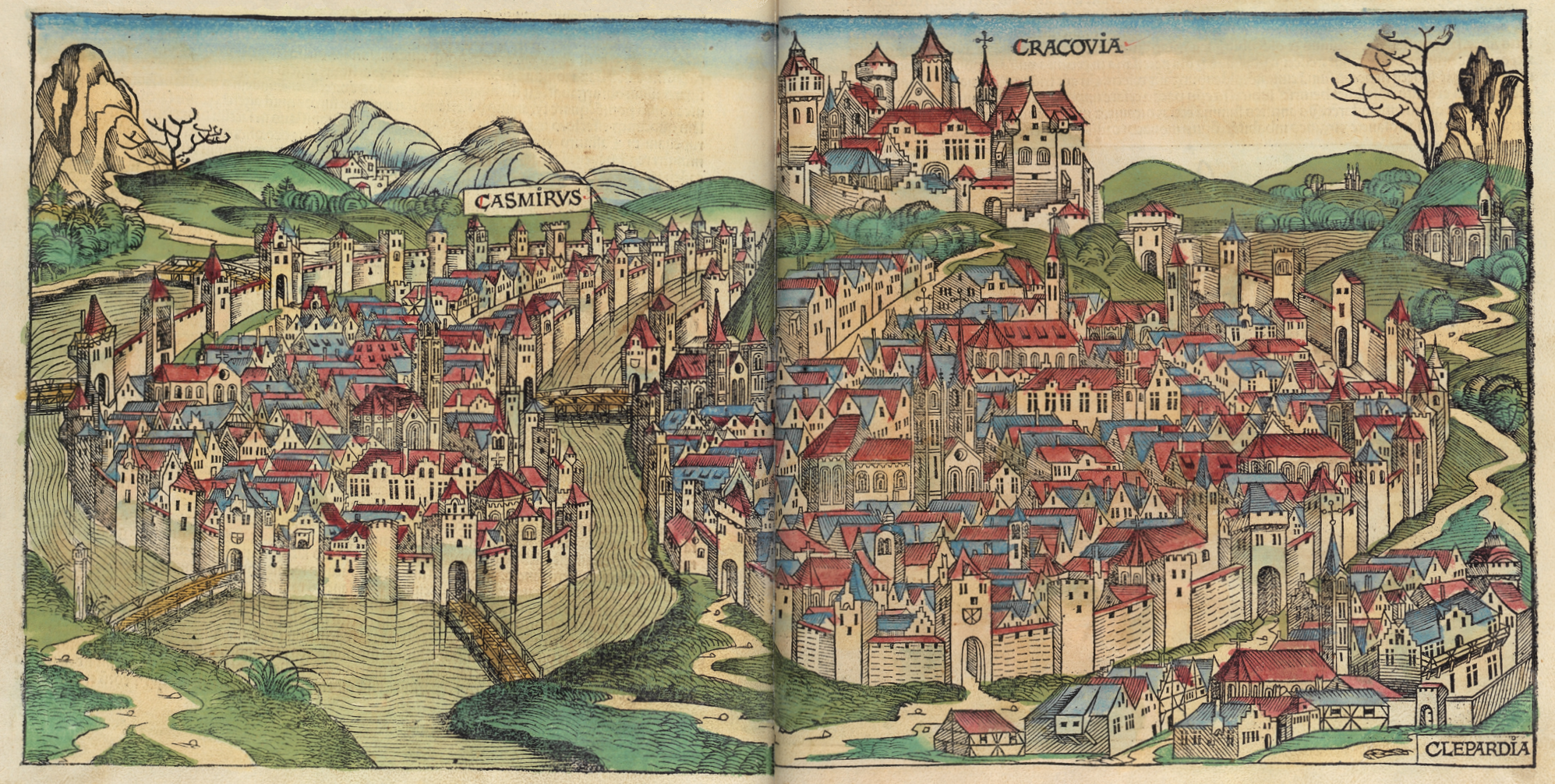
Kraków, capital of the voivodeship, in the 15th century

Voivodeship Governor (Wojewoda) seat:

- Kraków

Sejmiks (or territorial) seat:

- Proszowice

Regional council (sejmik generalny) seat:

- Nowe Miasto Korczyn

== Voivodes ==
- Skarbmir 1106–1117
- Klemens 1123–1168 [1]
- Mikołaj Gryfita ?-1202
- Marek z Brzeźnicy 1176-c. 1226
- Teodor Gryfita ?-1237
- Włodzimierz 1191–1241
- Klemens z Ruszczy ?-1256
- Klemens Latoszyński 1213–1265
- Sulisław z Branic 1232–1283
- Piotr Bogoria 1240–1290
- Mikołaj Łagiewnicki 1245–1290
- Wierzbięta z Ruszczy 1246–1324
- Tomisław Mokrski 1276–1326
- Mikołaj Bogoria 1291–1346
- Andrzej 1309–1354
- Mścigniew Czelej 1298–1357
- Imram 1312–1357
- Andrzej Tęczyński 1318–1368
- Dobiesław Kurozwęcki 1306–1397
- Spytko II of Melsztyn 1351–1399
- Jan z Tarnowa przed 1349–1409
- Piotr Kmita 1348–1409
- Jan Tarnowski 1367 -1433
- Piotr Szafraniec ?-1437
- Jan Czyżowski 1373–1459
- Jan z Tęczyna między (1408–1410) – 1470
- Jan Pilecki 1410–1476
- Dziersław Rytwiański 1414–1478
- Jan Rytwiański 1422–1479
- Jan Amor Młodszy Tarnowski 1425–1500
- Spytek III Jarosławski 1436–1519
- Piotr Kmita z Wiśnicza 1442–1505
- Jan Feliks Tarnowski 1471–1507
- Mikołaj Kamieniecki 1460–1515
- Krzysztof Szydłowiecki 1467–1532
- Andrzej Tęczyński ?-1536
- Otto Chodecki 1467–1534
- Jan Amor Tarnowski 1488–1561
- Piotr Kmita Sobieński 1477–1553
- Mikołaj Herburt Odnowski 1505–1555
- Stanisław Tęczyński 1521–1561
- Spytek Jordan 1519–1580
- Stanisław Myszkowski
- Stanisław Barzi 1529–1571
- Jan Firlej 1515–1574
- Piotr Zborowski
- Andrzej Tęczyński ?-1588
- Mikołaj Firlej 1532–1601
- Mikołaj Zebrzydowski 1553–1620
- Jan Magnus Tęczyński 1579–1637
- Stanisław Lubomirski 1583–1649
- Władysław Dominik * Zasławski-Ostrogski 1618–1656
- Władysław Myszkowski 1600–1658
- Stanisław Rewera Potocki 1579–1667
- Michał Zebrzydowski 1617–1667
- Jan Wielopolski (starszy) 1605–1668
- Aleksander Michał Lubomirski 1598–1677
- Jan Leszczyński 1598–1693
- Dymitr Jerzy Wiśniowiecki 1631–1682
- Andrzej Potocki ?-1691
- Feliks Kazimierz Potocki 1633–1702
- Hieronim Augustyn Lubomirski 1633–1706
- Marcin Kątski 1635–1710
- Franciszek Lanckoroński ok. 1645–1715
- Janusz Antoni Wiśniowiecki 1678–1741
- Jerzy Dominik Lubomirski 1665–1727
- Franciszek Wielopolski 1658–1732
- Teodor Lubomirski 1683–1745
- Jan Klemens Branicki 1689–1771
- Wacław Rzewuski 1706–1779
- Antoni Lubomirski 1715–1782
- Stanisław Kostka Dembiński 1708–1781
- [[Piotr Małachowski]] 1730–1797

== Administrative division ==
In 1397, the Voivodeship was officially divided into three counties (powiats):

- Proszowice County (Powiat Proszowicki), Proszowice
- Żarnowiec County (Powiat Żarnowiecki), Żarnowiec
- Kraków County (Powiat Krakowski), Kraków

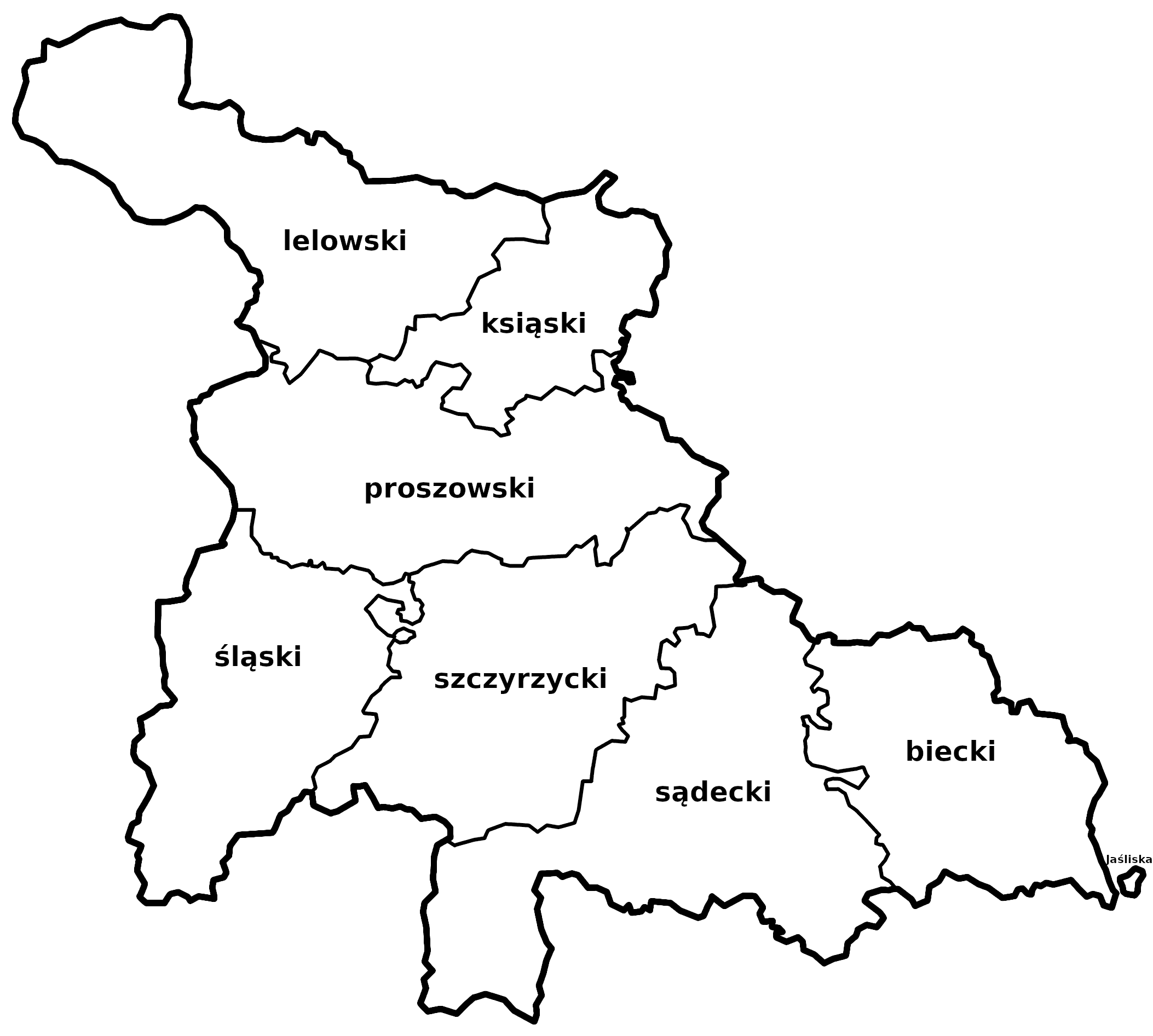
Administrative division at the end of the 16th century

In the 16th century, the number of counties rose to seven:

- Proszowice County (Powiat Proszowicki), Proszowice
- Lelów County (Powiat Lelowski), Lelów
- Szczyrzyc County (Powiat Szczyrzycki), Szczyrzyc
- Książ County (Powiat Ksiąski), Książ Wielki
- Nowy Sącz County (Powiat Sądecki), Nowy Sącz
- Biecz County (Powiat Biecki), Biecz
- Silesian County (Powiat Śląski)
  - Duchy of Zator (Księstwo Zatorskie), Zator
  - Duchy of Oświęcim (Księstwo Oświęcimskie), Oświęcim

Also, the Duchy of Siewierz, (Księstwo Siewierskie), with capital in Siewierz, was ruled by the Bishops of Kraków, but officially, it was not part of the Voivodeship until 1792, when it was annexed into Poland.

Neighbouring Voivodeships:

- Sieradz Voivodeship
- Sandomierz Voivodeship
- Ruthenian Voivodeship
- Silesia (not part of Poland at that time).

== Cities and towns of Kraków Voivodeship (1662) ==
=== Cities and towns of Proszowice County ===
- Kraków,
- Kazimierz,
- Podzamcze (now a district of Kraków),
- Kleparz,
- Skalbmierz,
- Będzin,
- Chrzanów,
- Sławków,
- Olkusz,
- Działoszyce,
- Proszowice,
- Słomniki,
- Koszyce,
- Nowa Góra,
- Nowe Brzesko

=== Cities and towns of Szczyrzyc County ===
- Myślenice,
- Tymbark,
- Bochnia,
- Uście Solne,
- Nowy Wiśnicz,
- Jordanów,
- Wieliczka,
- Dobczyce,
- Skawina,
- Lanckorona.

=== Cities and towns of Silesian County ===
- Wadowice,
- Żywiec,
- Kęty,
- Oświęcim,
- Zator.

=== Cities and towns of Książ County ===
- Miechów,
- Jędrzejów (in 1682 known as Andrzejów),
- Wodzisław,
- Żarnowiec,
- Książ Wielki,
- Wolbrom,
- Skała.

=== Cities and towns of Nowy Sącz County ===
- Wojnicz,
- Czchów,
- Nowy Sącz (Nowy Sandecz),
- Stary Sącz (Stary Sandecz),
- Piwniczna,
- Nowy Targ,
- Lipnica Murowana,
- Zakliczyn,
- Tylicz,
- Muszyna,
- Krościenko nad Dunajcem,
- Grybów.

=== Cities and towns of Lelów County ===
- Kromołów (now a district of Zawiercie),
- Mrzygłód (now a district of Myszków),
- Włodowice,
- Żarki,
- Częstochowa,
- Kłobuck,
- Krzepice,
- Mstów,
- Przyrów,
- Lelów,
- Pilica,
- Szczekociny,
- Kossów.

=== Cities and towns of Biecz County ===
- Bobowa,
- Dukla,
- Gorlice,
- Nowy Żmigród,
- Ciężkowice,
- Jasło,
- Dębowiec,
- Osiek Jasielski,
- Jaśliska,
- Biecz.
