= Zawiercie =

Town in Silesian Voivodeship, Poland

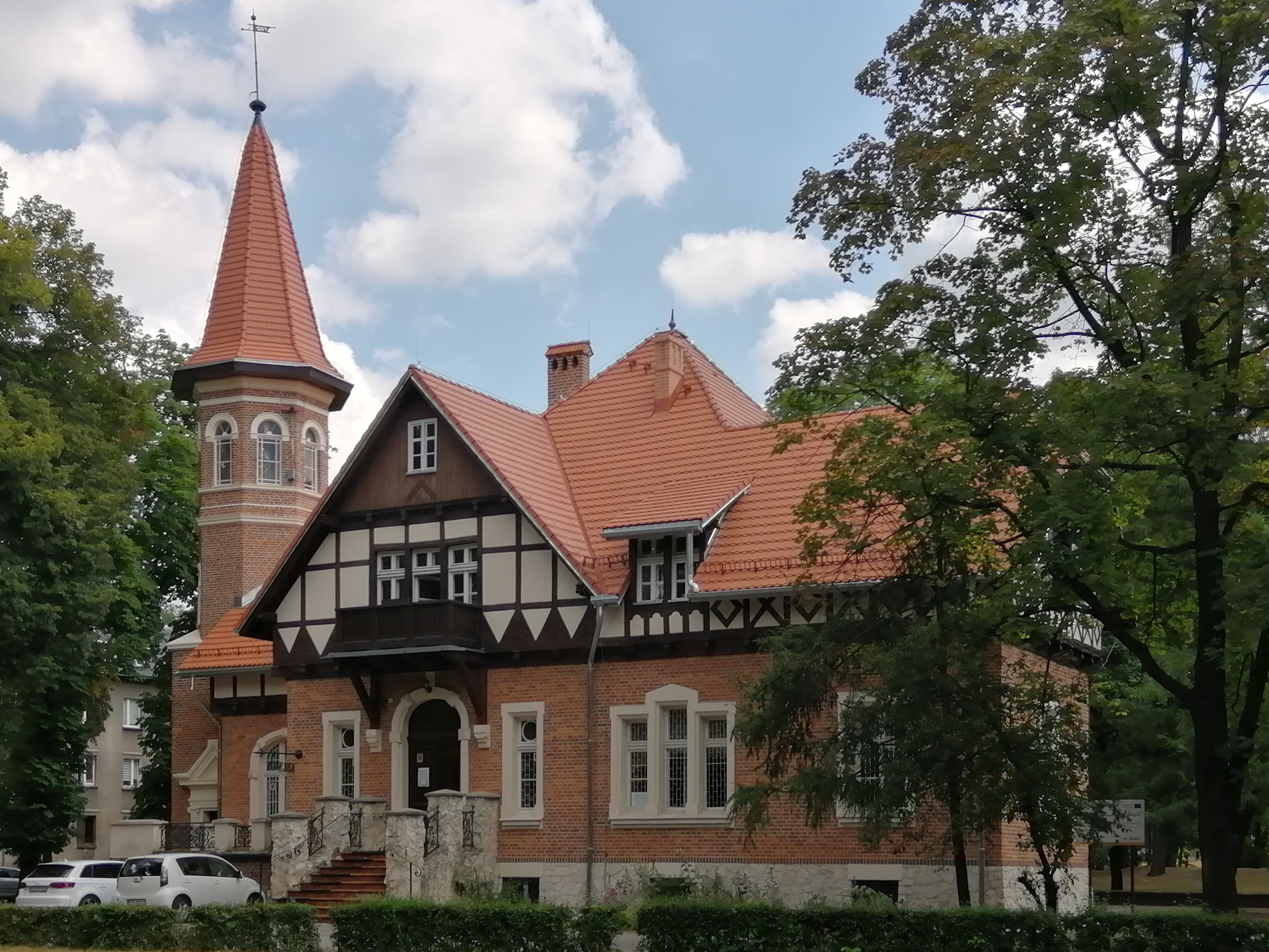
- Szymański Palace

- Coat of arms
- Interactive map of Zawiercie
- Location within Poland Location within Silesian Voivodeship
- Coordinates: 50°30′N 19°25′E
- Country: Poland
- Voivodeship: Silesian
- County: Zawiercie
- Gmina: Zawiercie (urban gmina)

Government
  - City mayor: Anna Nemś (PO)

Area
  - Total: 85.24 km^{2} (32.91 sq mi)
- Highest elevation: 400 m (1,300 ft)
- Lowest elevation: 300 m (980 ft)

Population (2019-06-30)
  - Total: 49,334
  - Density: 578.8/km^{2} (1,499/sq mi)
- Time zone: UTC+1 (CET)
  - Summer (DST): UTC+2 (CEST)
- Postal code: 42-400 to 42-431
- Area code: (+48)32
- Car plates: SZA
- Website: www.zawiercie.eu

Zawiercie ([zaˈvʲɛrt͡ɕɛ]) (Note: Yiddish: זאוויערטשע, romanized: Zavirtshe) is a town in southern Poland located in the Silesian Voivodeship with 49,334 inhabitants (2019). It is situated in the Kraków-Częstochowa Upland near the source of the Warta River. The town lies near the historical region of Silesia, but belongs to Lesser Poland.

Zawiercie is an industrial town with a rich history of iron manufacturing dating back to the 15th century, with other industries developed since the 19th century. It contains both historical Baroque architecture and preserved historical industrial heritage. It is home to notable volleyball club Warta Zawiercie.

== Name and location ==
Zawiercie, even though currently associated with Silesia, belongs to Lesser Poland. The town lies near the source of the Warta river, and its name probably comes from the location. The inhabitants of the ancient village of Kromołów, to reach another village located on the other side of the river, would go behind the Warta, or in Polish - za Wartę. From the perspective of Kromołów, Zawiercie is located behind the Warta. There is also a theory that the name of the city comes from settlers who zawiercili (or circled) the settlement area. The town is a gateway to the Polish Jura, where several castles, which used to defend western border of Lesser Poland, are located.

Zawiercie has the area of 85 square kilometers, and until 1945, the town was administratively tied with Lesser Poland's Kielce. It is located along the Warsaw–Vienna railway.

== History ==
=== Early history ===
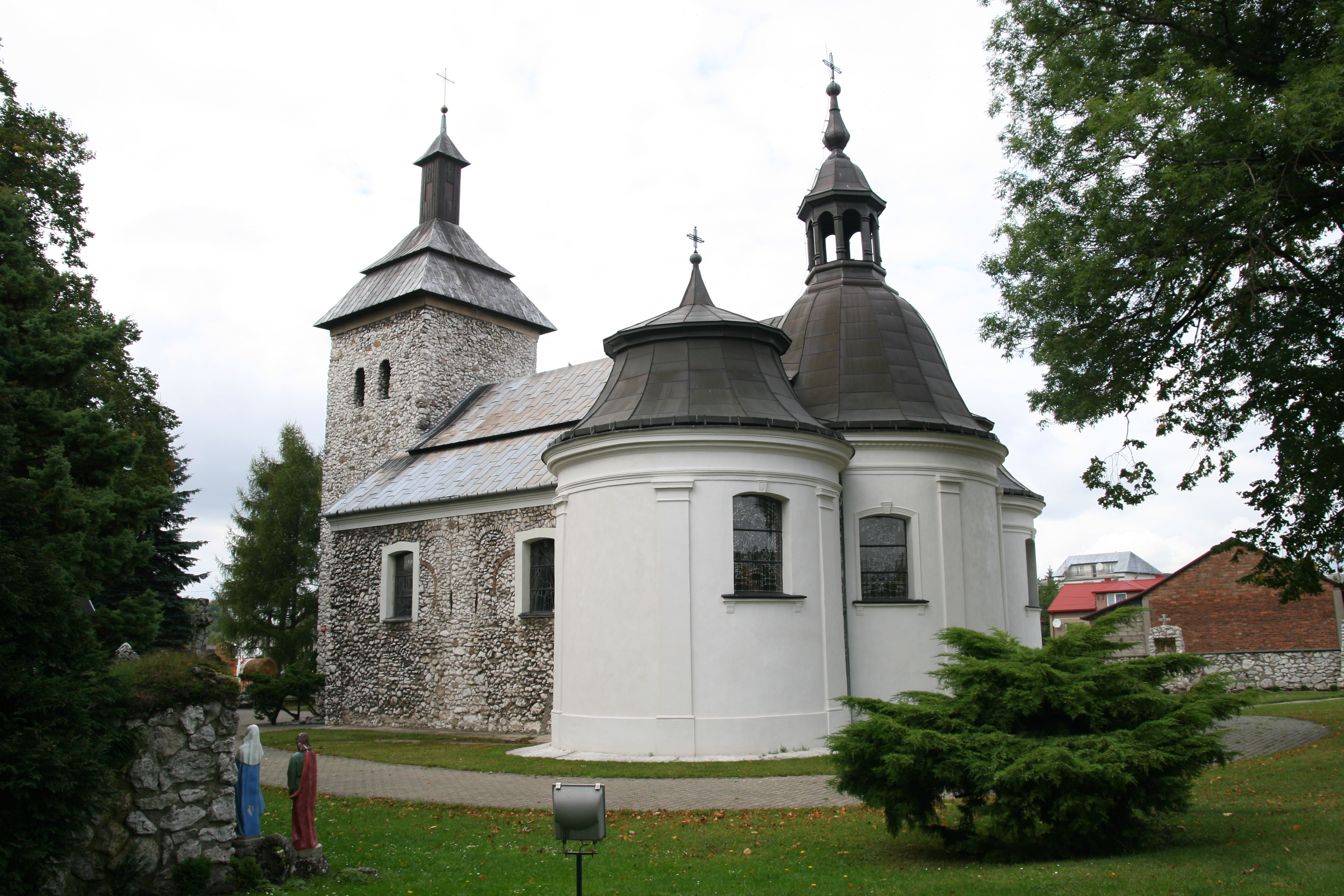
Baroque Holy Trinity church

First mention of the village of Kromołów (now a district of Zawiercie) comes from 1193. In the 14th century, the village was located in western Lesser Poland, along a merchant road from Kraków to Poznań. In 1431, Duke Bolko IV of Opole allowed a man named Mikołaj Czenar to open an inn here, and in his document, the name Zawiercie is mentioned for the first time. In the 15th century, the area became the early center of iron manufacturing, but despite this Zawiercie remained for centuries a small village. It was administratively located in the Lelów County in the Kraków Voivodeship in the Lesser Poland Province of the Kingdom of Poland. Until the 19th century, it was divided into Zawiercie Małe (Small Zawiercie) and Zawiercie Duże (Big Zawiercie), both administratively belonged to the gmina of Kromołów.

In 1795 Zawiercie was annexed by the Kingdom of Prussia in the Third Partition of Poland, becoming part of the small province of New Silesia. In the 1807 Treaties of Tilsit it became part of the short-lived Polish Duchy of Warsaw, a French client state in a personal union with the Kingdom of Saxony. In 1815 it passed to Russian-controlled Congress Poland. Zawiercie owes its development to the construction of the railroads.

=== Industrial growth ===
On 1 December 1847 the first train came to the village, along the newly built Warsaw–Vienna railway. This gave Zawiercie a boost, and in the second half of the 19th century, several companies and coal mines were opened in the village, including Zawiercie Steel Plant, opened in 1901. In 1878, construction of a settlement for workers was initiated, with schools, parks and churches. In 1894, Polish Socialist Party organized a mass sit-in at Zawiercie's Cotton Plant, and by 1914, the population of the village grew to 30,000. Zawiercie finally got its town charter on 1 July 1915. After World War I, in 1918, Poland regained independence and the town was reintegrated with Poland.

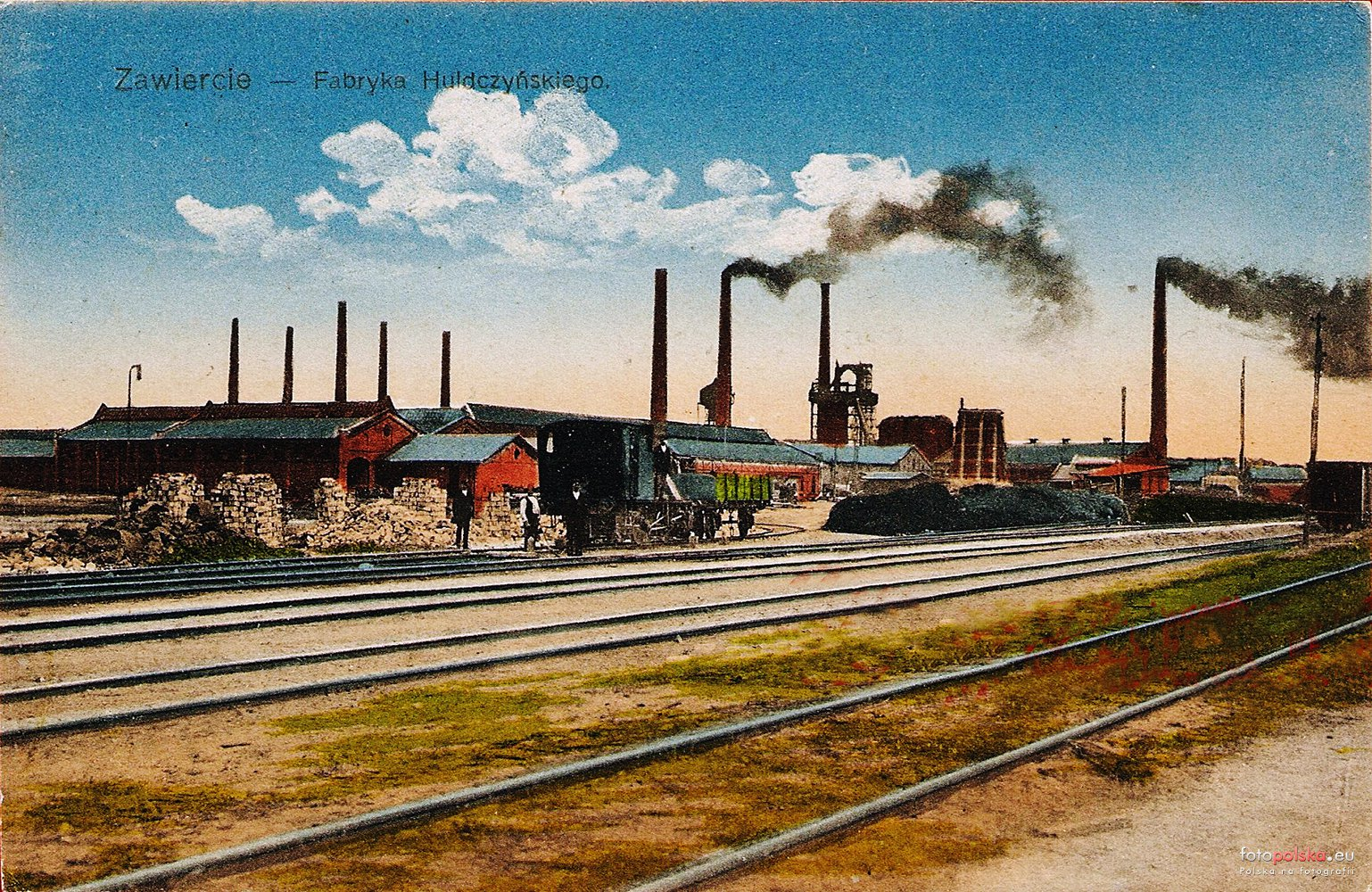
Huldczyński Ironworks ca. 1918

World War I and the 1920s was a bad time for Zawiercie. Unemployment grew, the steel plant closed and the TAZ factory reduced the number of workers. The situation did not improve until 1927 when Zawiercie County, part of Kielce Voivodeship, was created. According to the 1921 census, the town's population was 81.1% Polish, 18.4% Jewish and 0.3% Czech.

Local Jews made their living primarily from trade, crafts, the clothing industry and the metal industry. Printing houses owned by Jews played a central role in the cultural life in the city. The city had labor unions which were composed of small traders and artisans, as well as two banks, a charitable fund companies and charities. Between the World Wars in Zawiercie there were various Zionist parties and Agudat Israel. The city had a traditional “cheder” (religious primary school), a Talmud Torah, and a school and kindergarten which were part of the "Tarbut" Network. In 1926, A. Bornstein who was head of the Jewish community was also appointed mayor of the town.

There were pogroms were Zawiercie in 1919 and in 1921 which killed some Jews, and most of the city's Jews were affected – whether physically or having suffered material damage.

=== World War II ===
During the German invasion of Poland, which started World War II, the Germans entered Zawiercie on 4 September 1939. The town was directly annexed to the Upper Silesia Province (Regierungsbezirk Oppeln), and its name was changed to Warthenau to erase traces of Polish origin. The Polish and Jewish population was subjected to various repressions and crimes. The Germans established and operated a Nazi prison in the town, and also began kidnapping Poles and Jews for forced labour and acts of abuse. On 27 September 1939, the Germans imposed on the Jewish population a high ransom payment. In autumn of 1939, the Polish secret resistance organization Płomień was established, with its headquarters in the local trade school. Among its members were teachers, local officials, students, scouts, the trade school principal Wacław Chrzanowski and local parish priest Bolesław Wajzler. The organization issued Polish underground press, financially supported poorest families and tried to save the youth from being deported to forced labour to Germany. Zawiercie was one of three cities in the Polish territories annexed by Germany where the Polish Red Cross was able to operate, focusing mainly on supplying medicines and food to prisoners, including those at the Auschwitz concentration camp, before the local branch of the Polish Red Cross was shut down by the Germans in 1940.

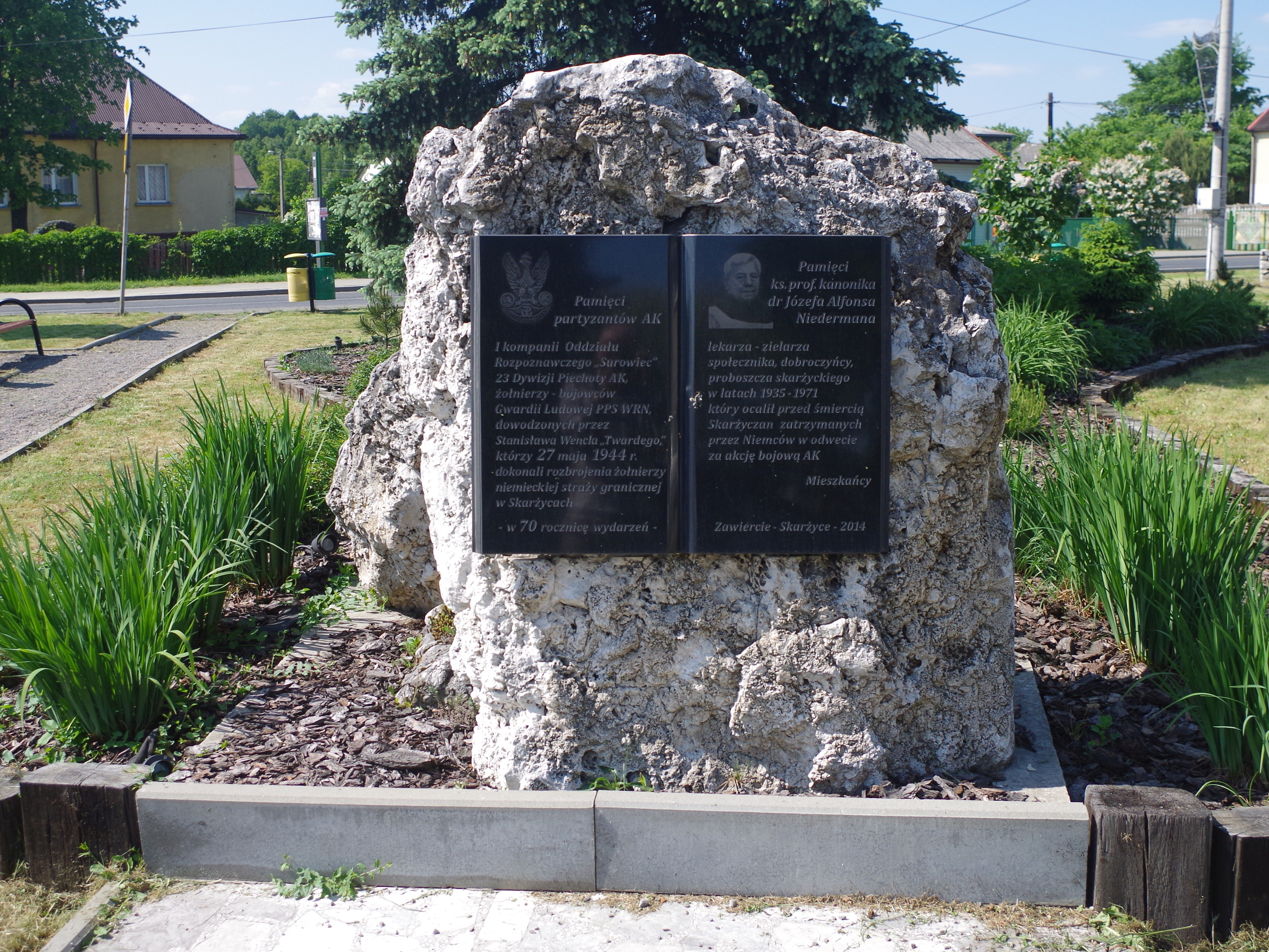
Memorial to partisans of the Home Army

At the beginning of 1940 the Germans confiscated all Jewish businesses. On 5 January 1940 they imposed a fine of 10 zloty for every Jewish resident of the city. In April 1940, 600 Jewish refugees from Cieszyn were brought to Zawiercie. In April–May 1940, over 150 Poles from Zawiercie were murdered by the Russians in the large Katyn massacre. On 18 September 1940 the Gestapo carried out mass arrests of over 100 members of the Płomień organization, who were then either sentenced to death and executed or imprisoned in Nazi concentration camps, where many died.

In the winter of 1940/41 the Jews were required to hand over all valuables, furniture and furs. On 22 July 1941, the Germans murdered seven Jews who were accused of communism. The Jewish population in 1941 was 5,500. In September 1941, a ghetto and a Judenrat (Jewish committee) were established. The Judenrat had to supply the Germans forced labor. In the “Aktion” in Zawiercie in May or August 1942, SS, Gestapo and German gendarmes, aided by the Blue Police, deported about 2,000 residents of the ghetto to the Auschwitz concentration camp. In early 1943, a factory to manufacture uniforms of the German Air Force was created and about 2500 Jews worked there. At the end of 1942 an underground group was formed in Zawiercie by the "Hashomer HaTzair" (Zionist Youth Movement) led by Berl Schwartz. Mordechai Anielewicz (commander of Warsaw Ghetto Uprising) from Warsaw visited the underground. The Underground assisted some Jewish families to escape across the border into Slovakia. Some of those smuggled across were captured and murdered. Zawiercie ghetto was liquidated in August 1943. SS, Gestapo, German gendarmes, and Blue Police deported to Auschwitz 6,000–7,000 Jews as well as locals and refugees who were brought from other places. Judenrat members were killed in the city before deportation. At the uniform factory there remained about 500 workers whose deportation was postponed since they were considered essential employees, and they were deported to Auschwitz on 18 October 1943.

In 1943, the occupiers carried out expulsions of some 300 Poles, whose workshops were then handed over to German colonists.

The Polish resistance carried out industrial sabotage and, on 21 January 1944, caused an explosion at the local steelworks. German occupation ended in January 1945 and the town was restored to Poland.

=== Post-war period ===
After the war, Zawiercie was transferred from Kielce Voivodeship to Katowice Voivodeship. In 1977, town limits were expanded by including Kromołów as a new district.

== Sights ==
Collegiate Basilica of Saints Peter and Paul

- Baroque Holy Trinity Church at Zawiercie-Skarżyce (16th-17th century),
- St. Nicolaus Church at Zawiercie-Kromołów (16th century),
- manor house at Zawiercie-Bzów (early 19th century)
- the palace of Stanisław Szymański (late 19th century)
- TAZ workers settlement (late 19th century)
- Collegiate Basilica of Saints Peter and Paul

== Zawiercie and Warsaw-Vienna Railway ==
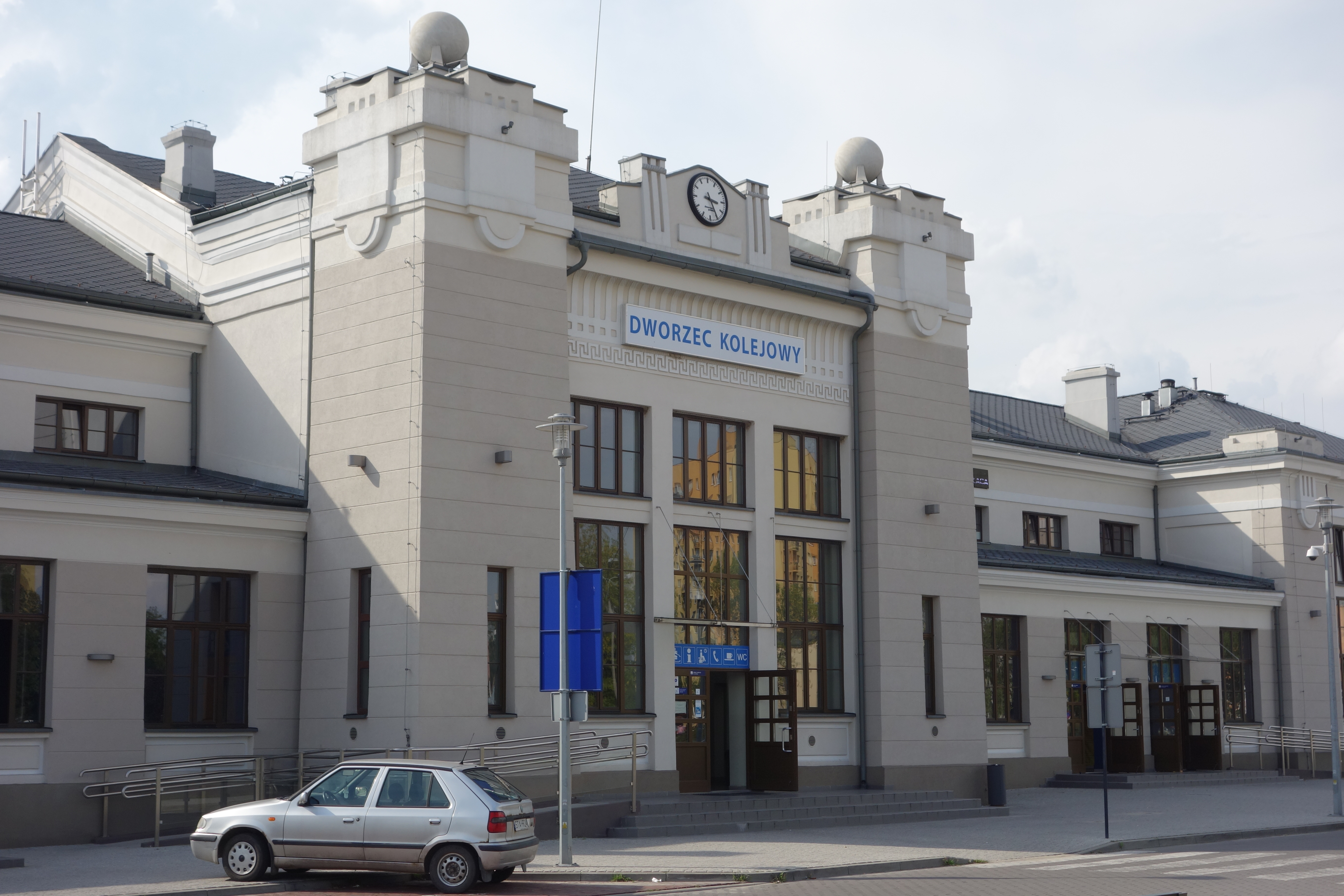
Zawiercie station building

In 1847, the Warsaw-Vienna Railway was completed. The railroad connection facilitated the trade between Russia, Germany and Austria. The fact that Zawiercie was located less than one kilometre from the railroad triggered the rapid development of the region. Twenty-five years later, there were coal and iron ore mines in Zawiercie and an industry was developed around the mines in the town. The first industrial plant, a glass factory, started around 1870. Immediately other industries followed; a large cotton spinnery, large weaving mill, iron mining, cast iron, brick manufacturing, sawmill, chemical laboratories, steam and water flour mills, machining, etc. The flourishing economics accelerated the local population growth.

== Education ==
- University of Management and Administration

== Sports ==
Zawiercie is home to the volleyball club Warta Zawiercie. There is also a football team of the same name established in 1921. The team's home ground is the 1000th Anniversary of the Polish State Stadium.

== Twin towns – sister cities ==
Zawiercie is twinned with:

- Bornheim, Germany
- Dolný Kubín, Slovakia
- Donetsk, Ukraine
- Ebensee, Austria
- Kamianets-Podilskyi, Ukraine
- Ponte Lambro, Italy
- San Giovanni la Punta, Italy
