= Biecz County =

Former administrative unit of Poland

Biecz County (Polish: powiat biecki) was an administrative unit (powiat) of both the Kingdom of Poland and the Polish–Lithuanian Commonwealth. With its seat in the town of Biecz, it was part of Kraków Voivodeship. Biecz County existed from the second half of the 14th century, until the first partition of Poland in 1772.

In the early Kingdom of Poland, the ancient town of Biecz was the seat of a castellany. In the 14th century, when castellanies were replaced by counties, the expansive Biecz County was created, one of seven such units of Kraków Voivodeship. Apart from Biecz itself, it included such towns, as Jasło, Gorlice, Dukla and Ciezkowice. In the 17th century, Biecz County had 11 towns and 264 villages, with an area of 2,300 km^{2} (890 sq mi).

In 1772, following first partition of Poland, Biecz was annexed by the Habsburg Empire. The county was disbanded by Austrian authorities in 1783.

== Sources ==
- Biecz, a community of Gorlice County
