= Książ County =

Old administrative unit of Poland

Książ County (Polish: powiat ksiąski) was an administrative unit (powiat), which existed for almost 400 years, both in the Kingdom of Poland and the Polish–Lithuanian Commonwealth. Created probably in 1400 with the seat at the town of Książ Wielki, it was part of Kraków Voivodeship. The county covered a vast area of land between the Wisła and the Nida rivers. Its total area was 1529 sq. kilometres, including such towns, as Jędrzejów, Miechów, Wolbrom and Skała. The county was disbanded in 1795, after the third partition of Poland.

== Sources ==
- Książ Wielki, a community of Miechow County
