= Szczyrzyc County =

Coordinates: 49°47′04″N 20°11′11″E

Szczyrzyc County (Polish: Powiat szczyrzycki) was an administrative territorial entity of the Kingdom of Poland and later Polish–Lithuanian Commonwealth. It is unknown when it was established, probably some time in the 14th century. It was located in the southern part of the Kraków Voivodeship, with the capital in the historic village of Szczyrzyc.

It has been estimated that the county's territory was around 3315 square kilometers, which made it one of the biggest counties of the Kingdom of Poland. Its borders spread from the Vistula to the Tatras, and among towns belonging to the county were such places as Niepołomice, Tymbark, Bochnia, Brzesko, Nowy Targ, Jordanów, Wiśnicz, Wieliczka, Dobczyce, Kalwaria Zebrzydowska, Maków Podhalański and Skawina.

The county ceased to exist in 1772, when after the First Partition of Poland, it was annexed by Austrian Empire.
