= Szczyrzyc =

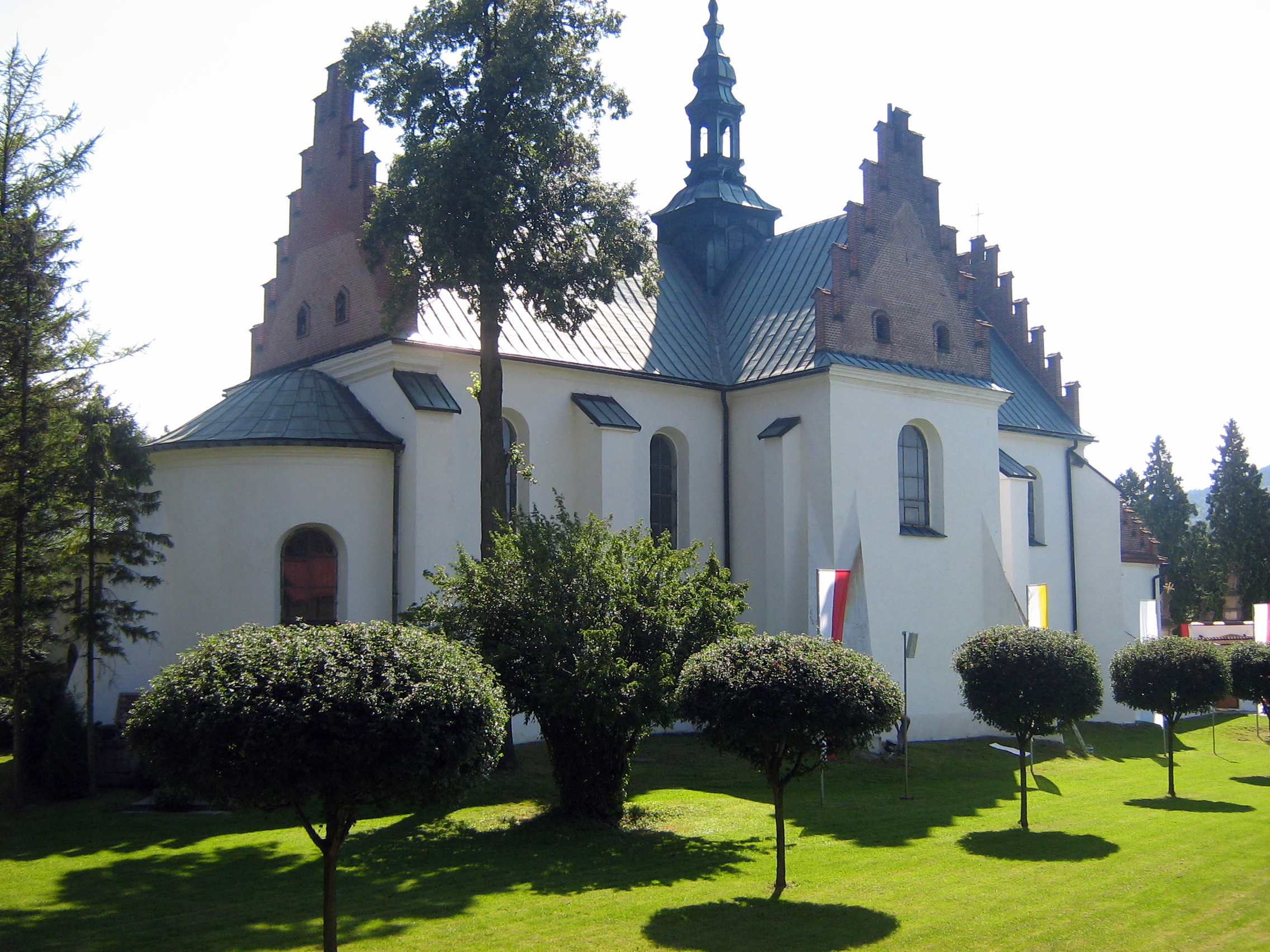
- 13th-century Cistercian abbey in Szczyrzyc

- Location within Poland
- Coordinates: 49°47′N 20°11′E
- Country: Poland
- Voivodeship: Lesser Poland
- County: Limanowa
- Gmina: Jodłownik
- Time zone: UTC+1 (CET)
  - Summer (DST): UTC+2 (CEST)
- Area code: +48 18
- Car plates: KLI

Szczyrzyc [ˈʂt͡ʂɨʐɨt͡s] (formerly Szczyrzyce) is a village in Poland, located in the Lesser Poland Voivodeship, Limanowa County, Jodłownik Commune. It is known for its 13th-century Cistercian abbey.

== Geography ==
Geographically it is located in the Beskid Wyspowy, in the Stradomka river valley.

== History ==
Szczyrzyc is notable for its 13th-century Cistercian abbey (the Cistercians Abbey in Szczyrzyc). The village itself dates from the 14th century.

In the Kingdom of Poland and Polish–Lithuanian Commonwealth, Szczyrzyc was the seat of Szczyrzyc County - a large county, which stretched from the Vistula to the Tatras, and which was disbanded in 1772.

It is the birthplace of writer Władysław Orkan (b. 1875) and composer Zygmunt Konieczny (b. 1937).

== Ecology ==
It is one of the places where Polish Red cattle can still be found.
