= 1000th Anniversary of the Polish State Stadium =

Multi-use stadium in Zawiercie, Poland

- Stadion 1000-lecia Państwa Polskiego
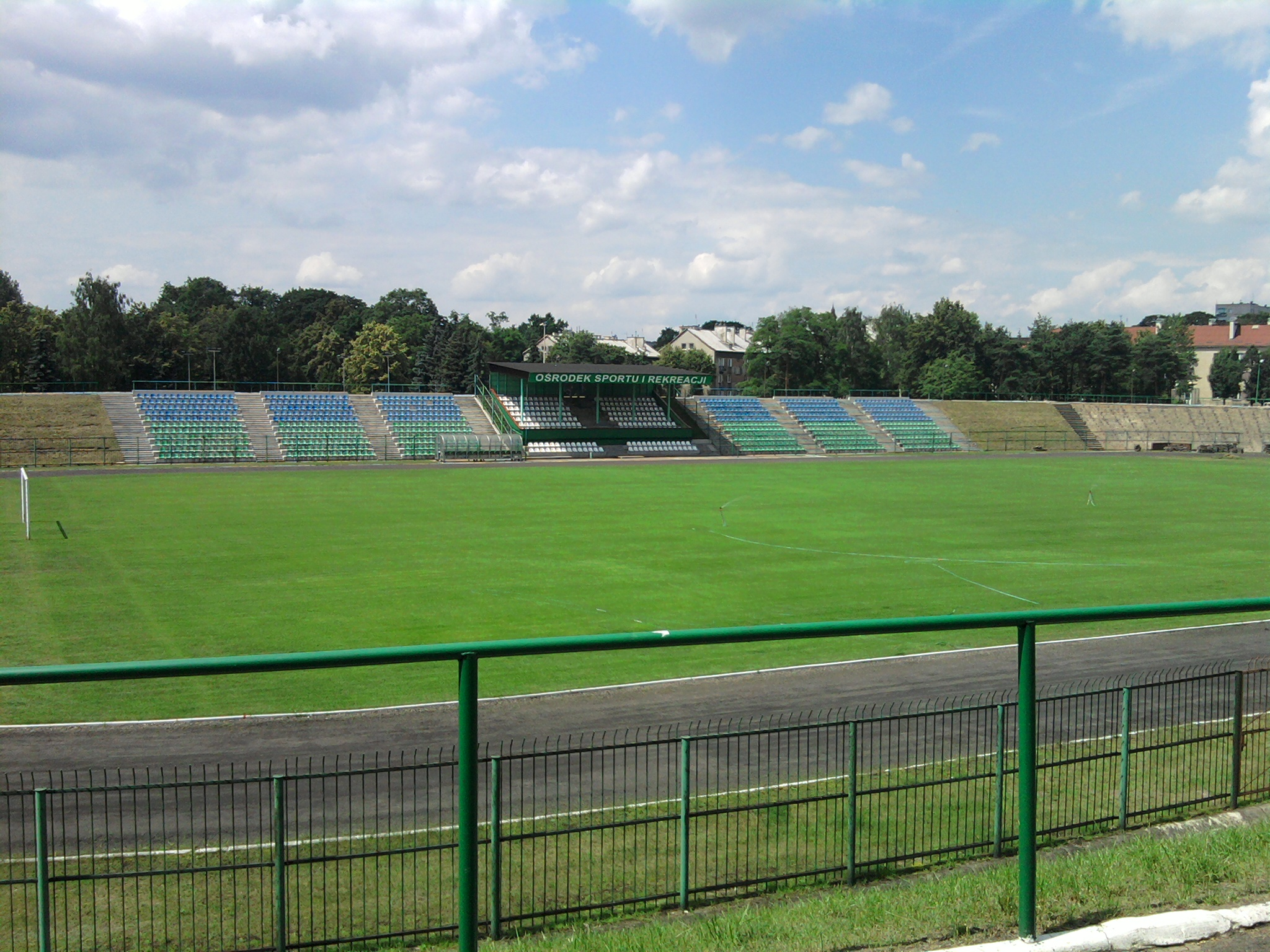
- Interactive map of 1000th Anniversary of the Polish State Stadium
- Location: Zawiercie, Poland
- Coordinates: 50.487487°N 19.432551°E
- Capacity: 9000
- Surface: Grass

Construction
- Opened: 1966

The 1000th Anniversary of the Polish State Stadium (Polish: Stadion 1000-lecia Państwa Polskiego) is a multi-use stadium in Zawiercie, Poland. The stadium has a capacity of 1500 people and was opened in 1966.

The stadium is the home of Warta Zawiercie.

== See also ==
- List of football stadiums in Poland
