= Lelów County =

Lelów County (Polish: Powiat Lelowski) was an administrative unit (powiat), which existed for over 400 years, both in the Kingdom of Poland and the Polish–Lithuanian Commonwealth. Its history dates back probably to the late 14th century, ending in 1837. In the 15th century, when Lelów County was part of Kraków Voivodeship, its total area was almost 2,500 square kilometres (970 sq mi). Among towns that belonged to it were Zawiercie, Myszków, Częstochowa, Kłobuck and Krzepice. The first known starosta of Lelów County was Zbigniew of Brzezie, mentioned in documents from 1408. The seat of the county was the town of Lelów.

Some time in late 16th century, Lelów County was expanded, and by early 17th century, it had nine towns (out of which five had the status of royal towns), and 182 villages. The county belonged to Kraków Voivodeship until the Partitions of Poland. In 1795 it became part of Prussian New Silesia, administered from Breslau. Prussian authorities initially renamed it Lelów-Siewierz County, and in 1807, while in the Duchy of Warsaw, it was renamed Lelów-Pilica County. After the Congress of Vienna, the county was annexed into Russian-controlled Congress Poland. In 1837, Lelów County was liquidated.

== Sources ==
- Powiat Lelowski w latach 1392 – 1792, praca zbiorowa, zebrali i opracowali: Antoni Białowąs, Marian Nowak, Mirosław Skrzypczyk. Lelowskie Towarzystwo Historyczno Kulturalne
