= Warta =

Major river in Poland

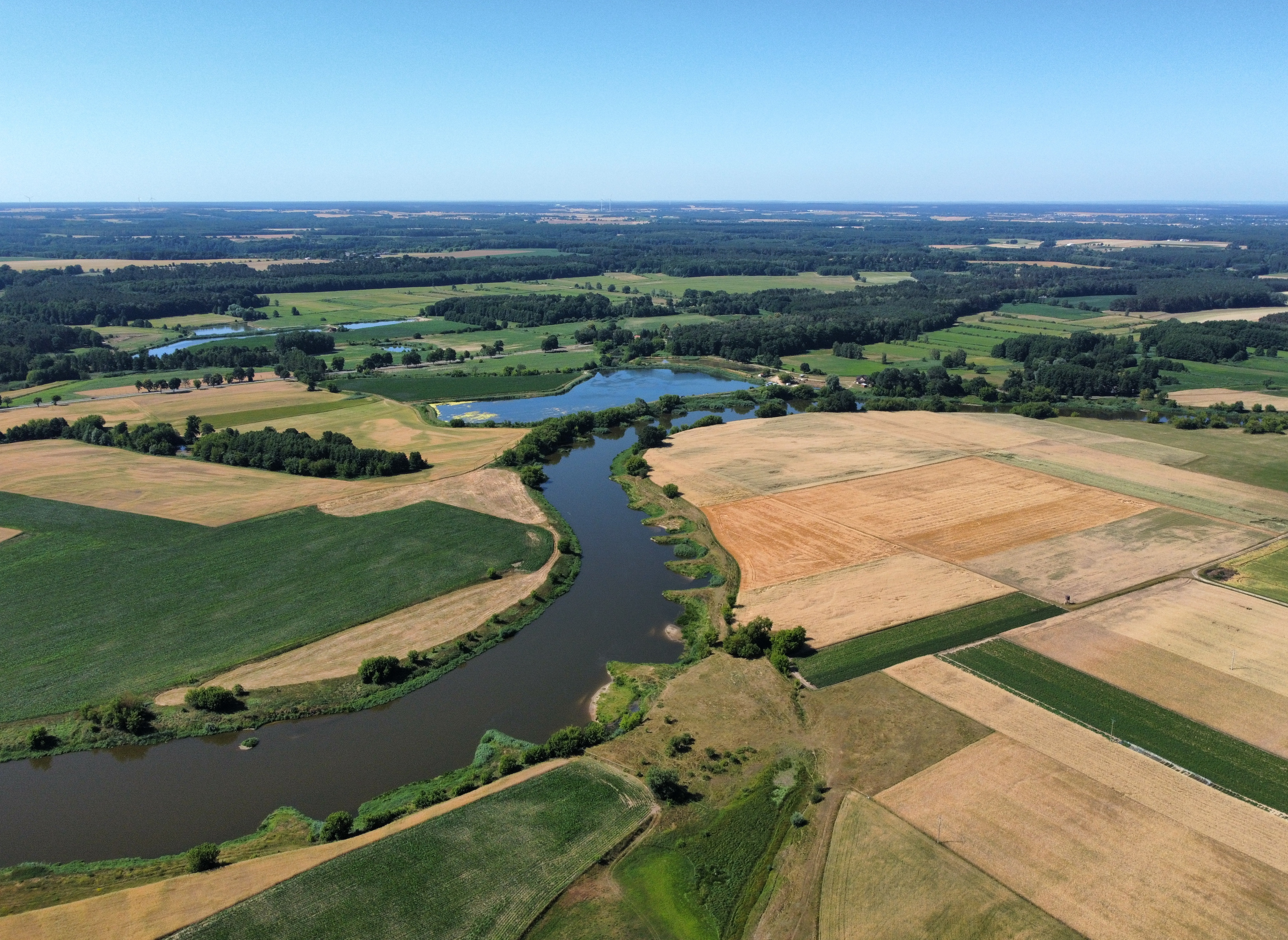
- Warta River near Międzychód

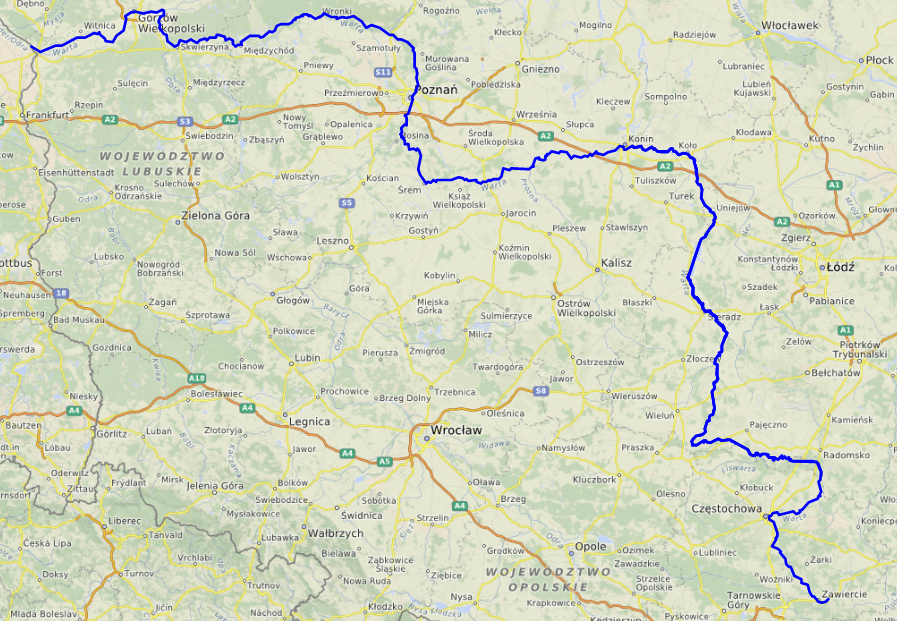

Location
- Country: Poland
- Cities: Częstochowa; Sieradz; Koło; Konin; Śrem; Poznań; Gorzów Wielkopolski; Kostrzyn nad Odrą

Physical characteristics
- Source
  - location: Kromołów, part of Zawiercie, Kraków-Częstochowa Upland
  - elevation: 380 m (1,250 ft)
- Mouth
  - location: Oder River at Kostrzyn
  - coordinates: 52.5986°N 14.6103°E
- Length: 808.2 km (502.2 mi)
- Basin size: 54,529 km^{2} (21,054 mi^{2})
- Discharge
  - average: 195 m^{3}/s (6,900 cu ft/s)

Basin features
- Progression: Oder→ Baltic Sea

The river Warta (/ˈvɑːrtə/ VAR-tə, Polish: [ˈvarta]; German: Warthe [ˈvaʁtə]; Latin: Varta) rises in central Poland and meanders greatly through the Polish Plain in a north-westerly direction to flow into the Oder at Kostrzyn nad Odrą on Poland's border with Germany. About 808.2 kilometres (502.2 mi) long, it is the second-longest river within the borders of Poland (after the Vistula), and the third-longest Polish river after the Oder (which also flows through the Czech Republic and Germany). Its drainage basin covers 54,529 square kilometers (21,054 sq mi). The Warta is navigable from Kostrzyn nad Odrą to Konin - approximately half of its length.

The Warta connects to the Vistula via its own tributary, the Noteć, and the Bydgoszcz Canal (Polish: Kanał Bydgoski) near the city of Bydgoszcz.

== Course ==
The Warta rises in the Kraków-Częstochowa Upland at Kromołów in Zawiercie, Silesian Voivodeship, flows through Łódź Land, Greater Poland and Lubusz Land, where it empties into the Oder near Kostrzyn at the border with Germany.

The Greater Warta Basin defines the site of early Poland; it is said that the tribe of Western Polans (Polish: Polanie) settled the Warta Basin between the 6th and 8th centuries. The river is also mentioned in the second stanza of the Polish national anthem, "Poland Is Not Yet Lost".

== Major cities ==
- Zawiercie
- Myszków
- Częstochowa
- Mstów
- Działoszyn
- Sieradz
- Warta
- Uniejów
- Koło
- Konin
- Pyzdry
- Śrem
- Mosina
- Puszczykowo
- Luboń
- Poznań
- Oborniki
- Obrzycko
- Wronki
- Sieraków
- Międzychód
- Skwierzyna
- Gorzów Wielkopolski
- Kostrzyn nad Odrą

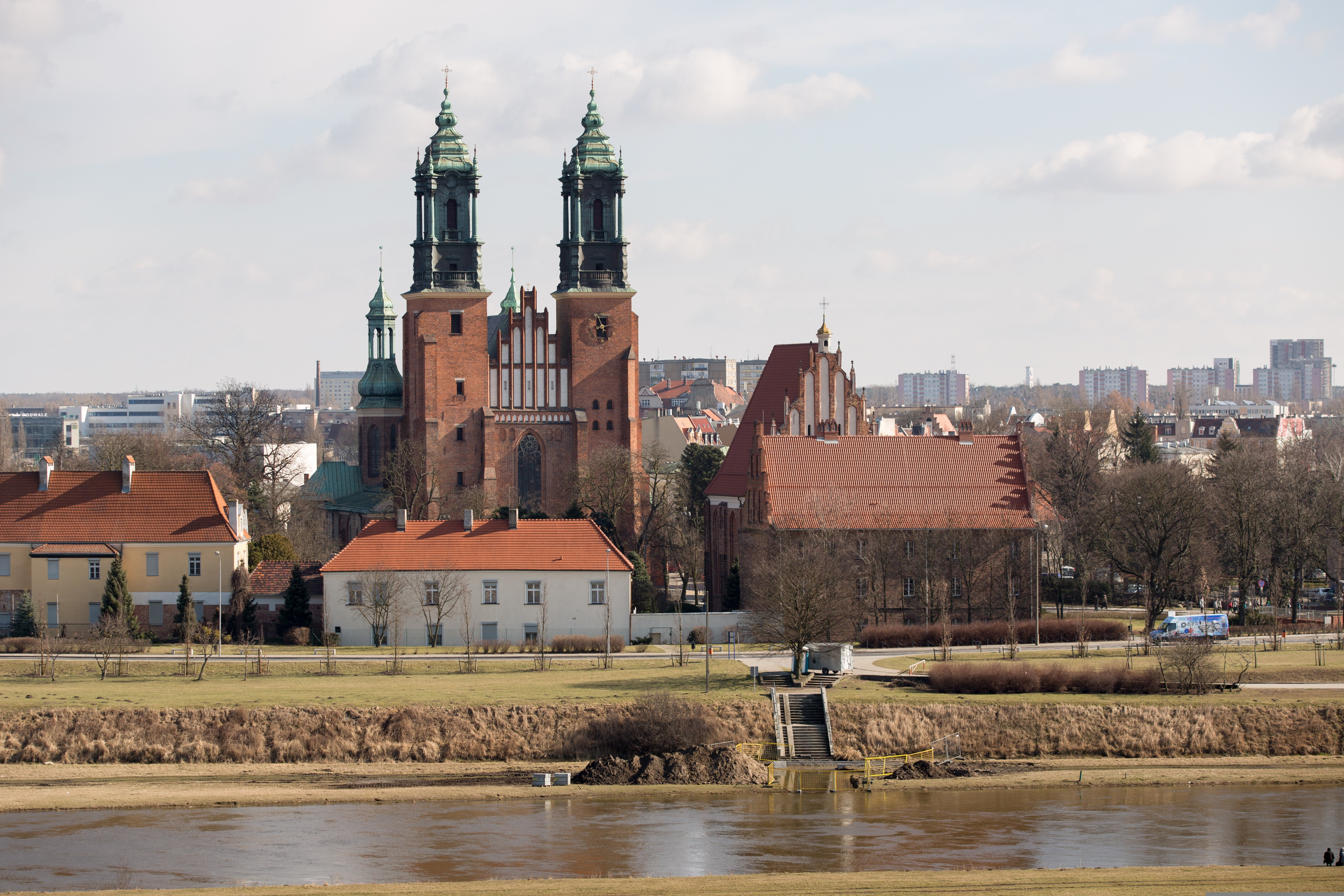
The Warta in Poznań

== Right tributaries ==
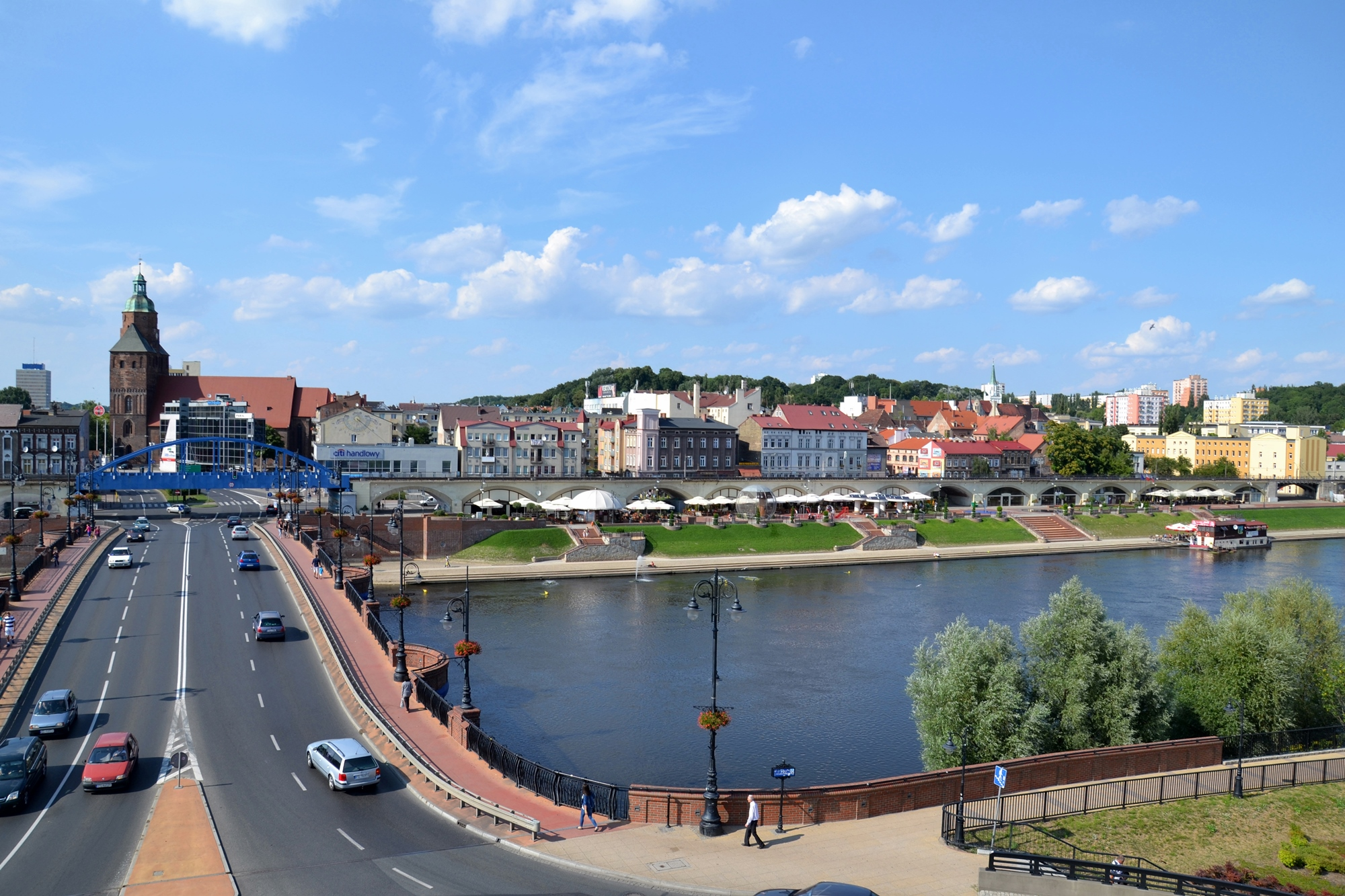
Warta River in Gorzów Wielkopolski

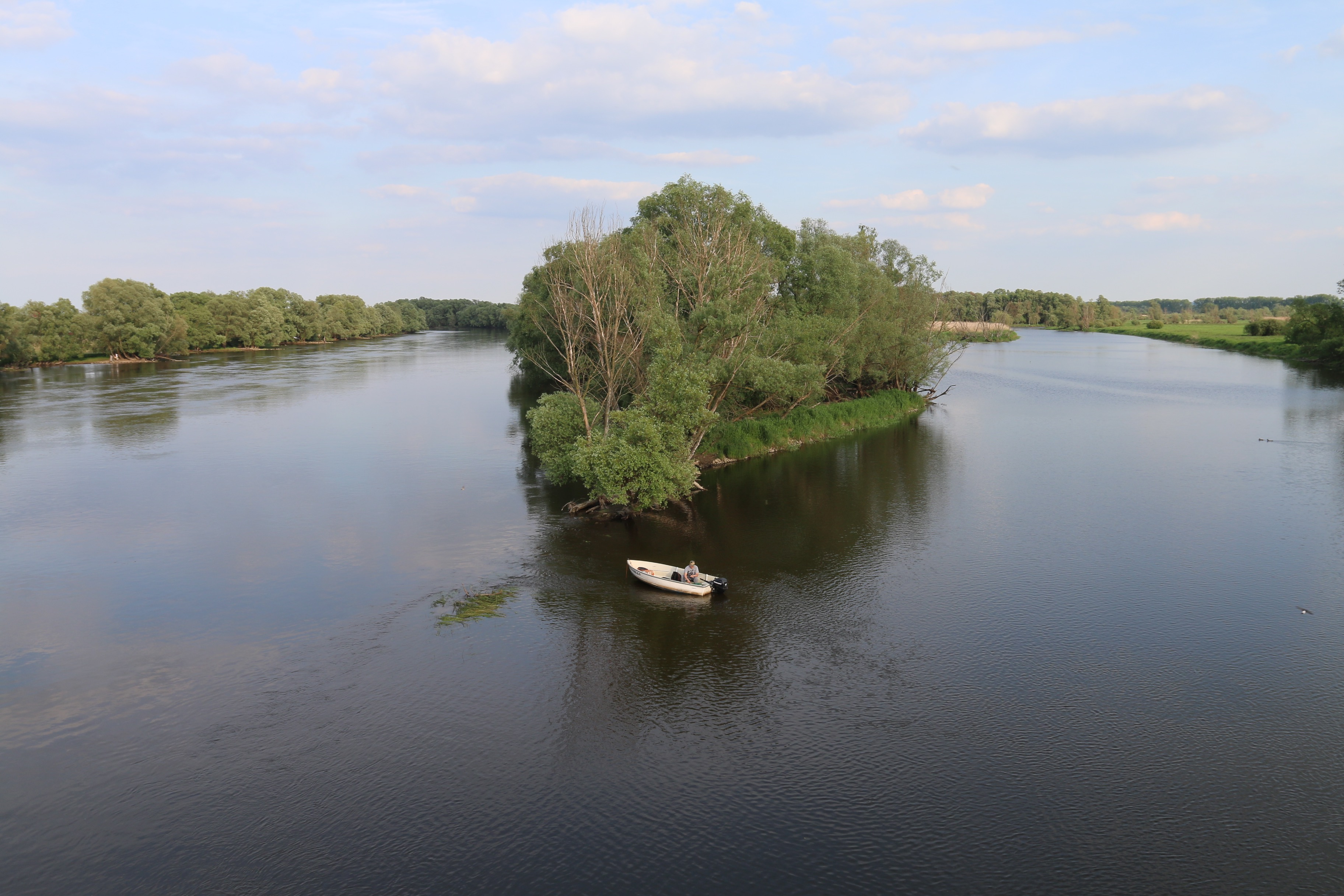
The Warta near Kostrzyn

- Widawka
- Ner
- Wełna
- Noteć

== Left tributaries ==
- Liswarta
- Prosna
- Obra
- Postomia

== See also ==
- Rivers of Poland
- Geography of Poland
- Warta Landscape Park
- Ujście Warty National Park
