= Warta Zawiercie (football) =

Silesian association football club

- Full name: Klub Piłkarski Warta Zawiercie
- Founded: 1921; 104 years ago
- Ground: 1000th Anniversary of the Polish State Stadium
- Capacity: 9,000
- Chairman: Tomasz Nowak
- Manager: Bartosz Zachara
- League: Regional league Silesia IV
- 2023–24: Regional league Silesia IV, 14th of 16
- Website: wartazawiercie.pl
Home colours

Warta Zawiercie is a Polish football club from Zawiercie.

== History ==
Warta Zawiercie was founded in 1921. First team players played in the white-red kits and reserve players played in the blue-red kits. The players played, prepared pitch, equipment and organized matches. In 1930 and 1932, club played in the playoffs for the Polish First League, but lost both. During World War II, the club did not exist and many of club's members was killed. Warta was reactivated in 1945 and started playing in Klasa B. In 1949, Warta was promoted to Klasa A. Between 1951 and 1955 the club played under the Stal Zawiercie name. In 1952, the club was first in their group, but lost in two-legged tie with Górnik Brzozowice-Kamień. In the 1962–63 season, Warta finished second in the third division and lost playoffs for first place. One season later, Warta was first in their group but lost promotion playoffs against Victoria Jaworzno, Dąb Katowice, Star Starachowice and Resovia Rzeszów. In 1966, a new stadium was built – the 1000th Anniversary of the Polish State Stadium. In 1979, there was a merger between Warta Zawiercie and Włókniarz Zawiercie and as a result, MRKS Warta Zawiercie was created. In 1998, Warta was promoted to fourth tier and one year later, to the third division. In 2001, Warta was relegated to fifth tier, and due to debts amounting to 500,000 zlotys, Warta was resolved.

In 2004, Warta Zawiercie was reactivated, before being dissolved in 2006 again.

In 2009, the club was reactivated again. The following year, Warta won promotion to Klasa A (7th level).

== Current squad ==
As of 30 June 2010

Note: Flags indicate national team as defined under FIFA eligibility rules; some limited exceptions apply. Players may hold more than one non-FIFA nationality.

No.	Pos.	Nation	Player
—	GK	POL	Bartosz Kurdek
—	GK	POL	Michał Nowak-Jaworski
—	GK	POL	Tomasz Walczyk
—	DF	POL	Piotr Bałdys
—	DF	POL	Dawid Gajecki
—	DF	POL	Krzysztof Jurak
—	DF	POL	Paweł Konopka
—	DF	POL	Włodzimierz Mukamiełow
—	DF	POL	Łukasz Pasternak
—	DF	POL	Adrian Szybis
—	DF	POL	Alan Szybis
—	MF	POL	Patryk Grim
—	MF	POL	Artur Kondas
—	MF	POL	Łukasz Kozłowski

No.	Pos.	Nation	Player
—	MF	POL	Mateusz Kozłowski
—	MF	POL	Mateusz Kucharski
—	MF	POL	Robert Majchrzak
—	MF	POL	Ariel Nędza
—	MF	POL	Marek Surowiec
—	MF	POL	Marcin Wałek
—	FW	POL	Artur Cholewka
—	FW	POL	Wojciech Czapla
—	FW	POL	Mateusz Dobrowolski
—	FW	POL	Michał Gryc
—	FW	POL	Miłosz Grajdek
—	FW	POL	Grzegorz Jarzyński
—	FW	POL	Grzegorz Przybysz
