= Głęboki Nurt =

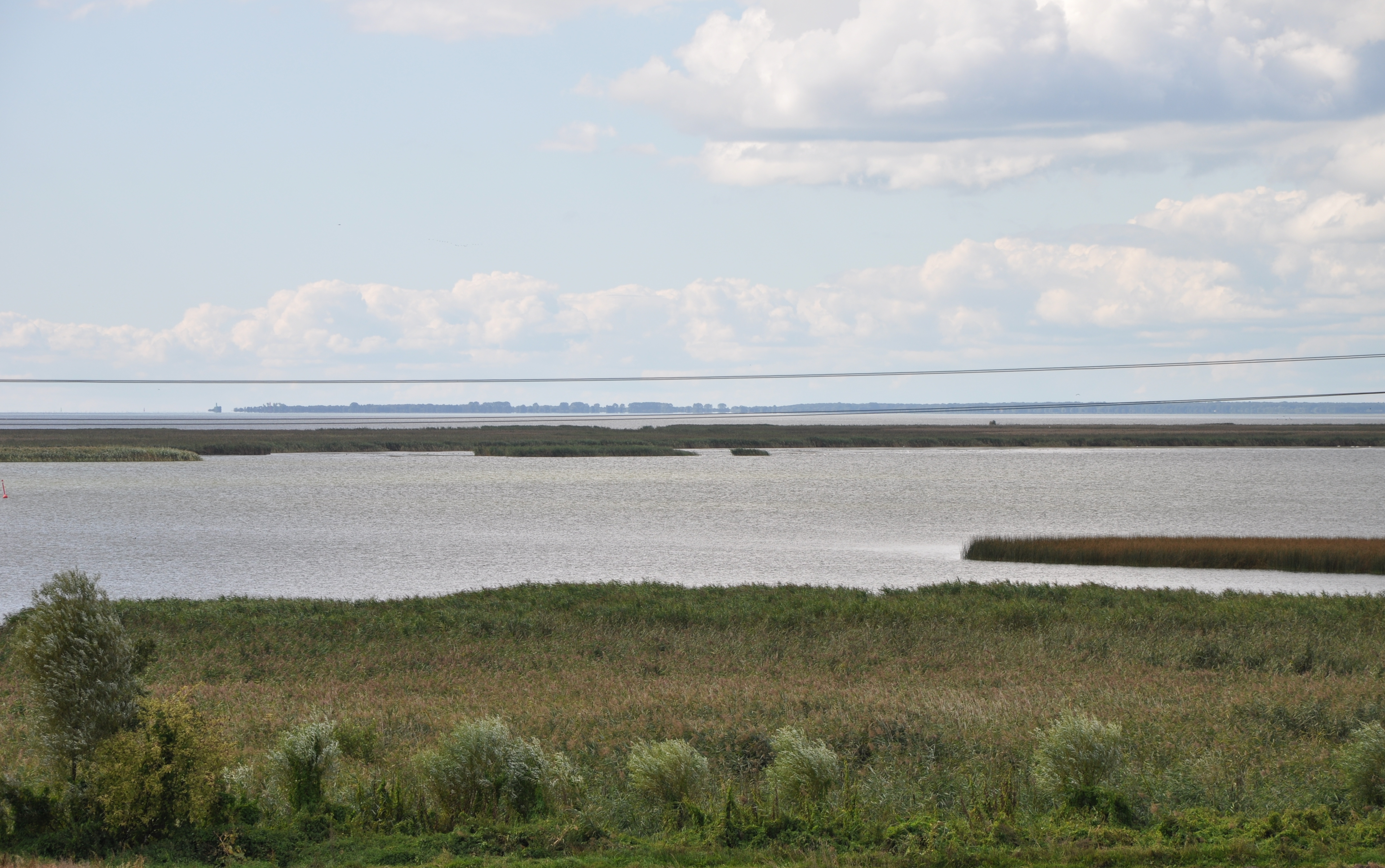
- Głęboki Nurt in 2009, as seen from the village of Zagórze
- Interactive map of Głęboki Nurt
- Location: Szczecin Lagoon – Dziwna
- Coordinates: 53°48′55″N 14°36′06″E
- Type: Strait
- Basin countries: Poland
- Settlements: Zagórze

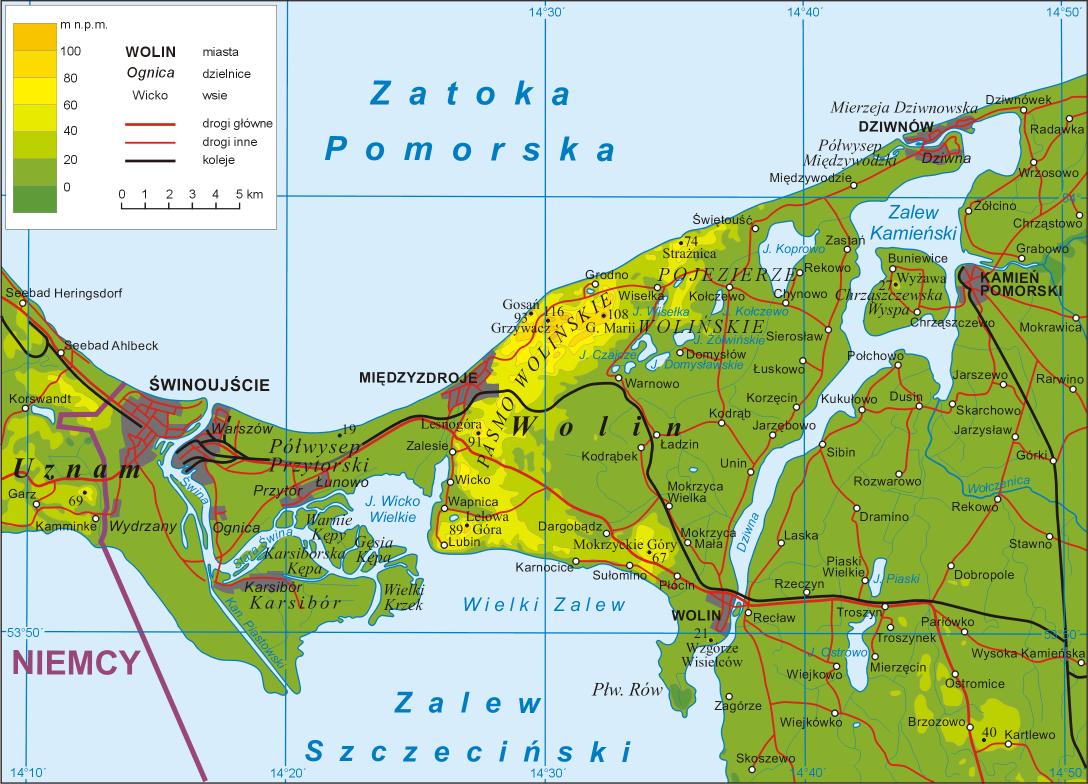
The map of the island of Wolin, including the strait of Głęboki Nurt.

Głęboki Nurt (Polish: [ɡwɛmˈbɔ.ki ˈnurt], lit. 'Deep Curren'; German until 1949: Der tiefe Zug [deːr tiːfe t͡suːk], lit. 'The Deep Draw') is a strait connecting the Szczecin Lagoon and Dziwna channel, located in the West Pomeranian Voivodeship, Poland. It separates the island of Wolin from the Trzebiatów Coast on the mainland.

To the east of the strait, on the mainland, are located Wydrza Góra hill, and the village of Zagórze. To the west of the strait, on the island of Wolin, is located Rów peninsula, and to the north-west, Gołogóra hill.
