= Wydrza Góra (Kamień County) =

Hill on Trzebiatów Coast, Poland

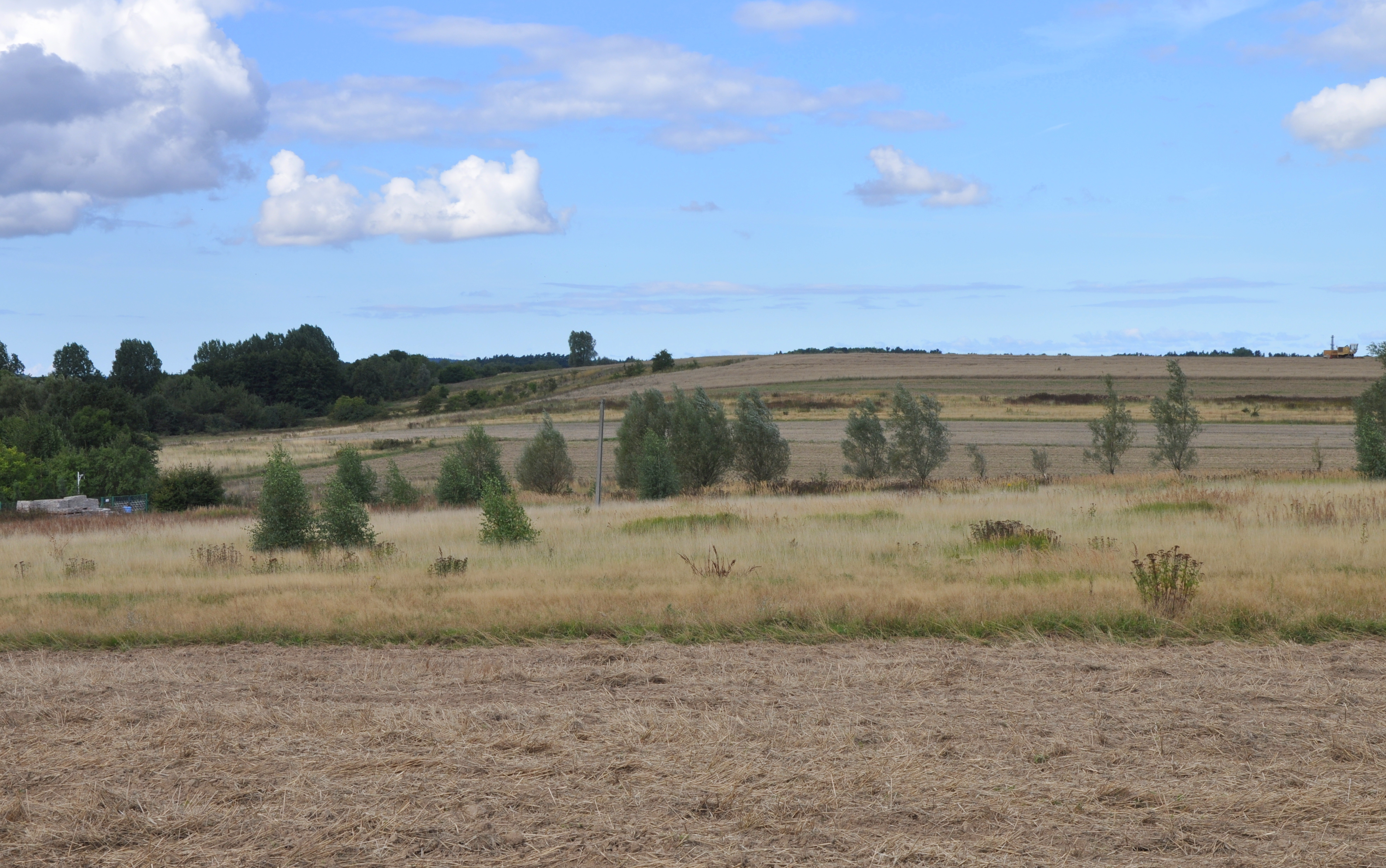
- Wydrza Góra in 2010, as seen from the village of Zagórze.

Highest point
- Elevation: 21 m (69 ft)
- Coordinates: 53°49′14″N 14°37′00″E

Geography
- Country: Poland
- Voivodeship: West Pomeranian Voivodeship
- County: Kamień County
- Gmina: Gmina Wolin

Wydrza Góra (Note: Translation from Polish: Otter Mountain; German until 1949: Otto Berg, literally: Otto's Mountain) is a hill on the Trzebiatów Coast, to the east from the strait of Głęboki Nurt. It is located in the West Pomeranian Voivodeship, Poland, within the Gmina Wolin, Kamień County. Its height above mean sea level is 21 m (68.9 ft). At its northern foothill is located the village of Gogolice, and to the south from it, Zagórze.
