= Seaside Narrow-Gauge Railway =

Narrow-gauge railway in Western Pomerania, Poland

The Seaside Narrow-Gauge Railway (formerly the Gryfice Narrow Gauge Railway) is a narrow-gauge railway in the Gryfice district in Western Pomerania, Poland. This is the remaining line from a much larger network, currently operating as a tourist railway.

== History ==
The Prussian Government authorised the building of the original narrow gauge railway at the end of the 19th century. The first section of line from Greifenberg (since 1945 called Gryfice) to Horst (today Niechorze) opened on 1 July 1896 with a track gauge of 750 mm. During 1912 this was widened to the current 1000 mm gauge. During 1913 the line was entended from Horst to Treptow where it met the Treptow to Deep railway opened the previous year.

== Current Operation ==
The European Union funded the revitalisation of the railway during 2011–2014. This included restoring the stations at Rewal and Pogorzelica, two locomotives and some carriages. The EU also funded refurbishment of Trzęsacz, Śliwin and Niechorze stations.

The current operation is in two parts: Gryfice - Trzęsacz and Trzęsacz - Pogorzelica. The Trzęsacz - Pogorzelica serves the seaside resort towns and offers a service of 5 return journeys between 10am and 6pm. The Gryfice - Trzęsacz section is served with one train pair, supplemented in the summer by an additional pair.

== Stops ==
km	mi	Polish name	German name	Notes	Picture
0.00	0	Gryfice Wąsk.	Greifenberg (Pommern) Ldb.	Inter-change with PKP standard gauge line	
4.10	2.55	Popiele	Chausseehaus b. Greifenberg (Pom.)		
=0.00	=0.00	Popiele	Chausseehaus b. Greifenberg (Pom.)		
4.77	2.96	Rybokarty	Ribbekardt		
6.10	3.79	Wilczkowo	Völschenhagen	Closed	
8.47	5.26	Niedźwiedziska	Medewitz (Kr. Greifenberg Pom.)		
12.57	7.81	Modlimowo	Muddelmow		
14.65	9.10	Paprotno	Parpart		
18.73	11.64	Karnice Wąsk.	Karnitz (Kr. Greifenberg Pom.) Ldb.		
22.78	14.15	Dreżewo	Dresow		
25.54	15.87	Trzęsacz	Hoff (Pommern)		
26.89	16.71	Rewal	Rewahl Seebad		
28.30	17.58	Śliwin	Schleffin		
31.4	19.5	Niechorze Wielkie	Groß Horst		
		Niechorze Latarnia			
32.31	20.08	Niechorze	Horst Seebad		
33.3	20.7	Liwia Łuża	Horst Liebelose	Closed	
33.98	21.11	Pogorzelica Sandra			
35.44	22.02	Pogorzelica Gryficka	Fischerkathen		

== Fleet ==
=== Steam Locomotives ===
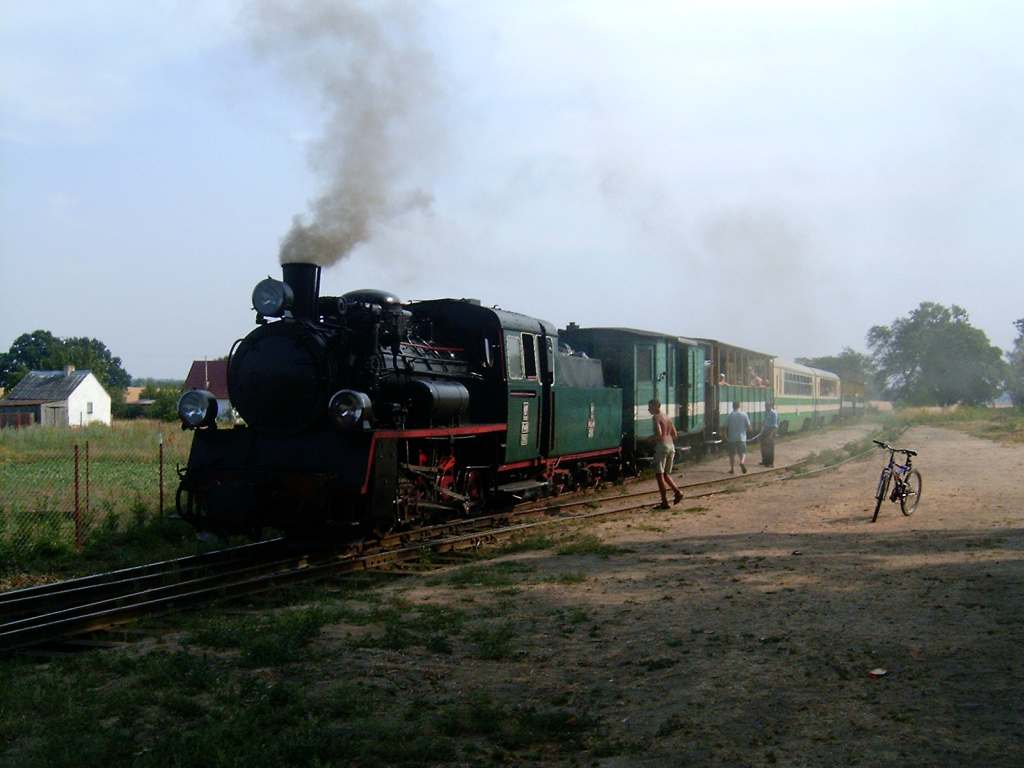

- Px48 3913
- Px48 3916

=== Diesel Locomotives ===
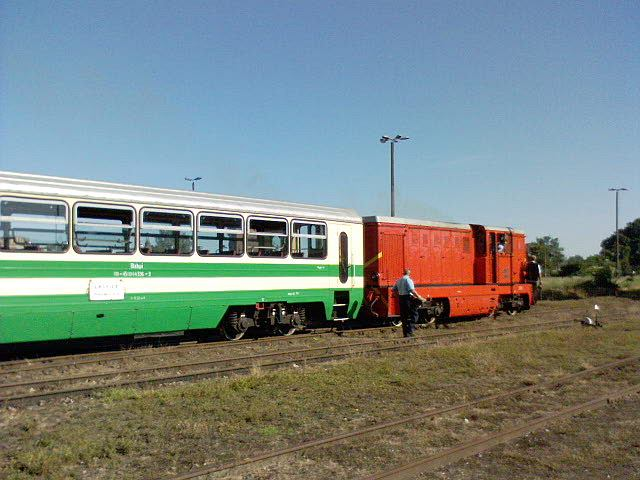

- Lxd2 472 (Faur 24841)
- Lxd2 473 (Faur 24842)
- Lxd2 474
- Lxd2 478 (Faur 25017)
- Lxd2 479

=== Diesel Railcars ===
- MBxd2 301
- MBxd2 310
