= Niechorze =

- Village
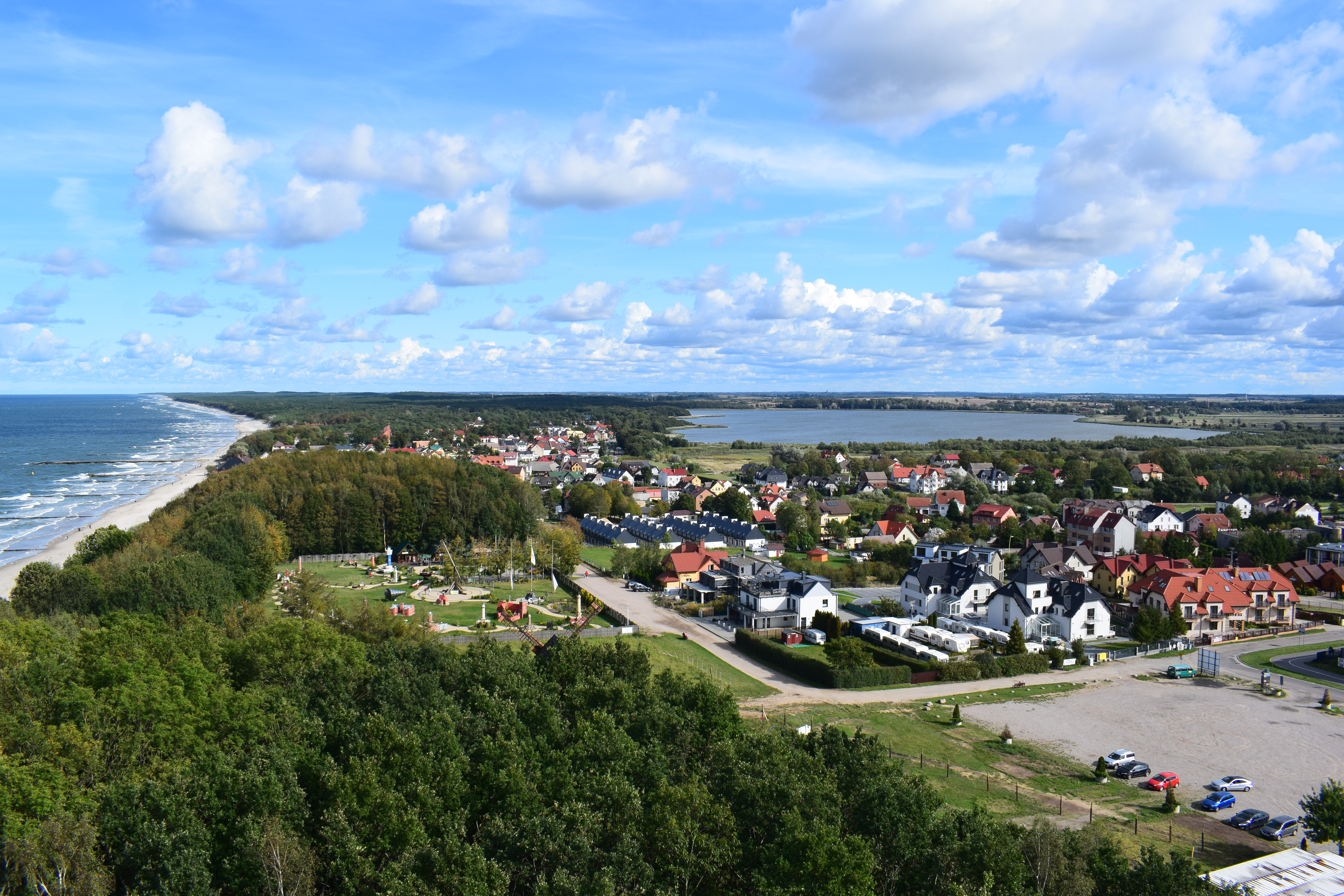
- View of Niechorze from the lighthouse with the beach and Baltic coast on the left and the Liwia Łuża Lake on the right

- Location within Poland
- Coordinates: 54°5′40″N 15°4′30″E
- Country: Poland
- Voivodeship: West Pomeranian
- County: Gryfice
- Gmina: Rewal
- Population: 904
- Time zone: UTC+1 (CET)
  - Summer (DST): UTC+2 (CEST)
- Vehicle registration: ZGY
- Website: http://www.niechorze.com/

Niechorze [ɲɛˈxɔʐɛ] (German: Horst or Groß Horst, from the 1930s till 1945 Horst-Seebad) is a village in the administrative district of Gmina Rewal, within Gryfice County, West Pomeranian Voivodeship, in north-western Poland. It is situated between the Baltic Sea to the north and Liwia Łuża lake to the south. It lies approximately 4 km (2 mi) east of Rewal, 22 km (14 mi) north of Gryfice, and 82 km (51 mi) north-east of the regional capital Szczecin. It is located on the Trzebiatowski Coast.

The village has a population of 904.

== History ==
At the beginning Horst (Niechorze) was a small fishing village. In 1866 a large lighthouse was built, which still exists. A settlement, back then known as Leuchtturm, developed close to the lighthouse. Development of the settlement began in 1870. In 1889 there were already 700 people living in Horst. On the 1 July 1896 a narrow-gauge railway (Kleinbahn) was opened connecting Kleinbahnhof Horst Seebad (today Niechorze) with Greifenberg (today Gryfice). On 1 May 1913 the line was extended to Fischerkaten (today Pogorzelica) and Treptow (today Trzebiatów). These connections helped to expand the village. Some 18th and 19th-century fishermen's huts still survive, although these are being demolished to make space for hotels.

== Sights ==
Sights of Niechorze (examples)

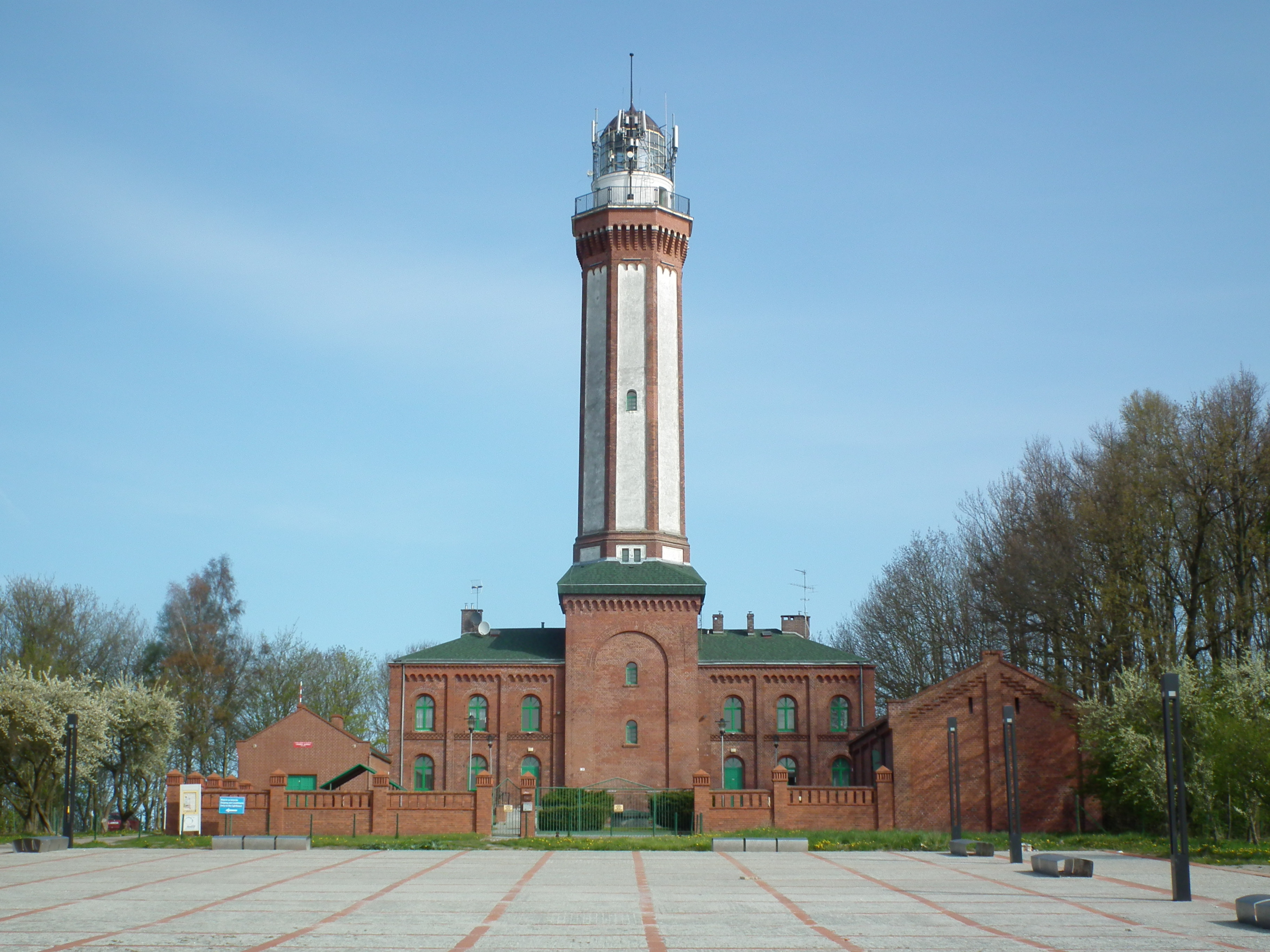
Lighthouse

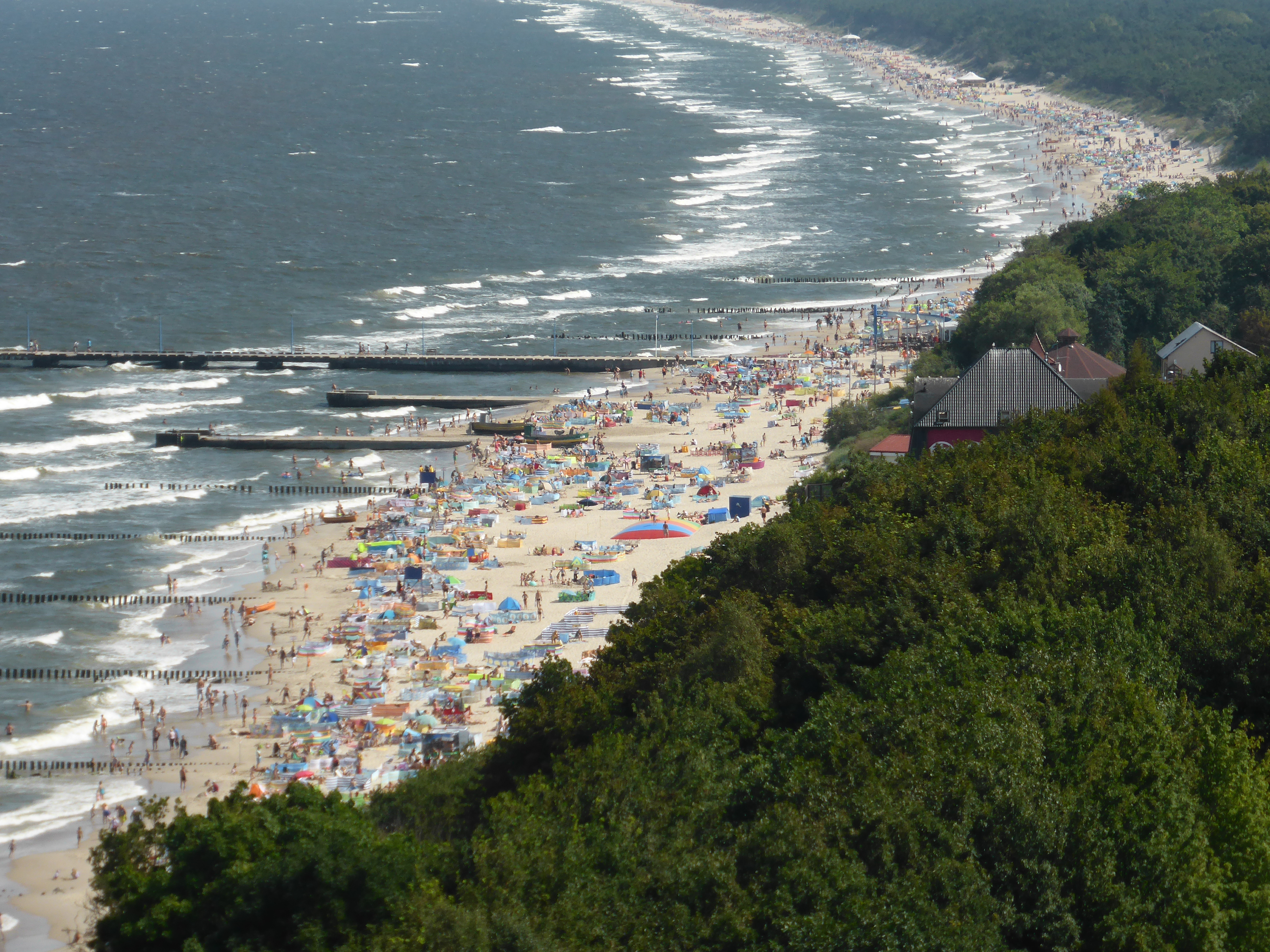
Beach

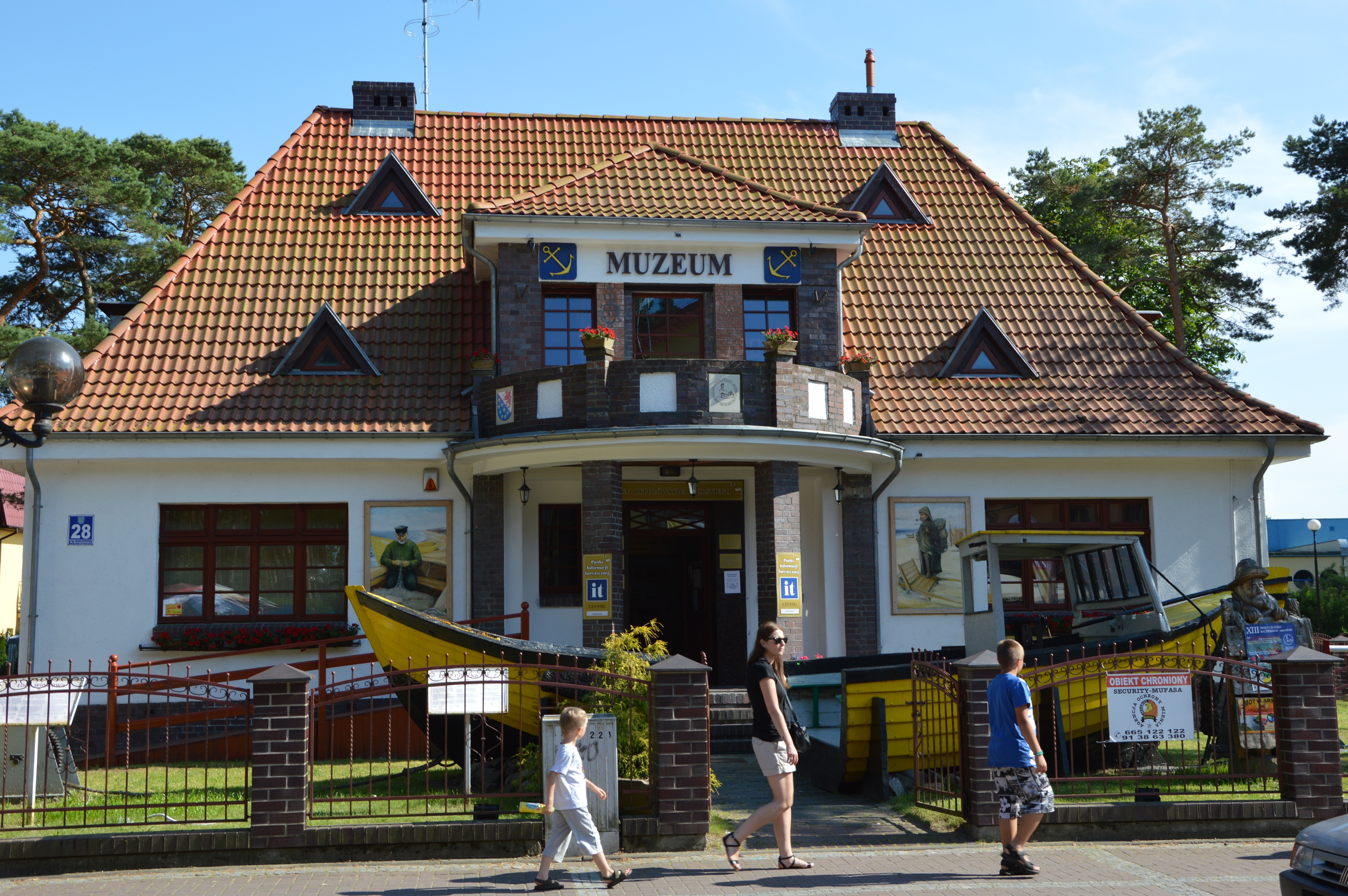
Fishing museum

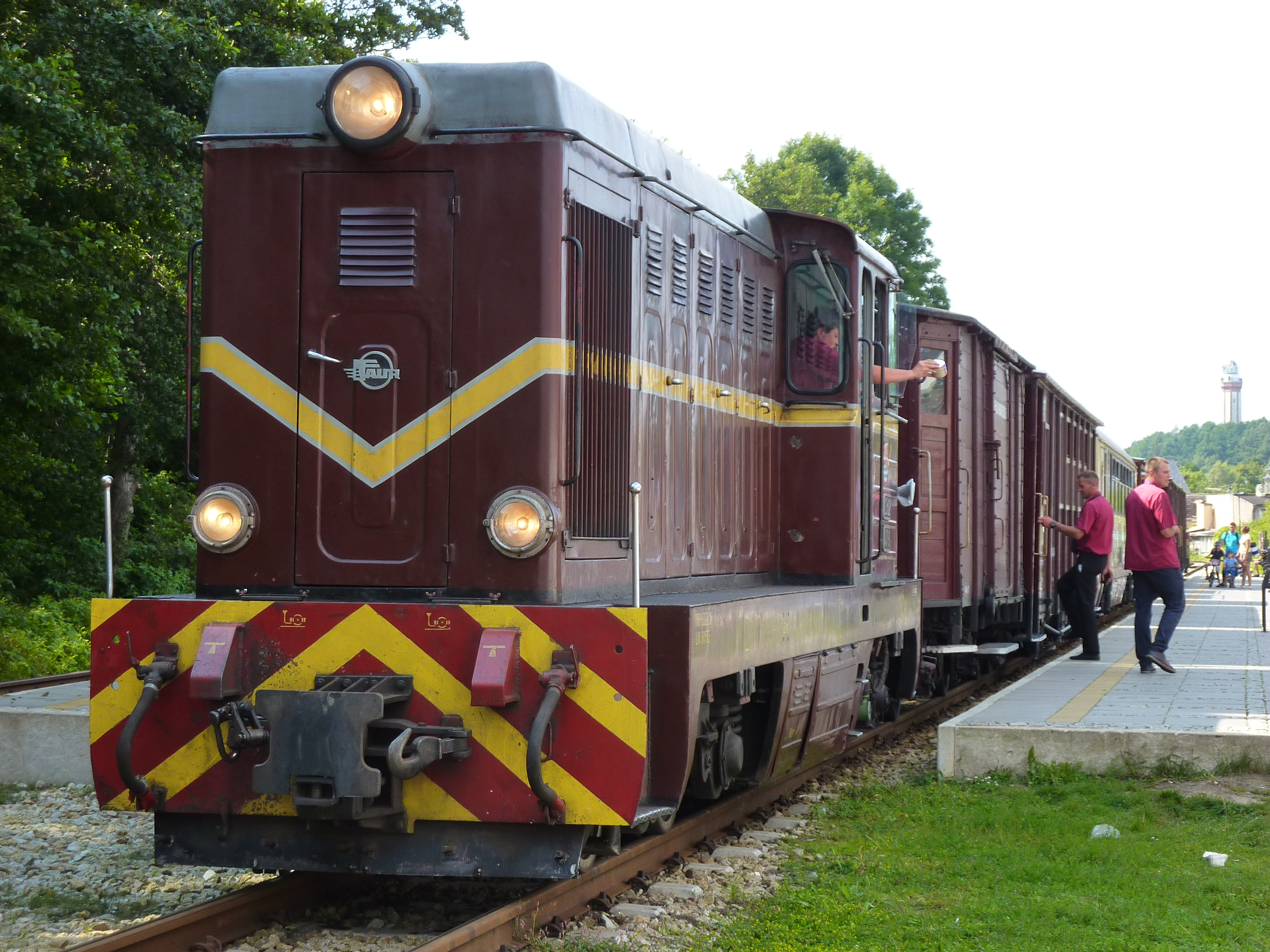
Narrow-gauge railway

=== Heritage sights ===
- Niechorze lighthouse, built in 1866, is the main landmark of the village, which looks over the whole settlement. The lighthouse is 45m tall and there are 200 stairs leading to the observation deck at the very top. On a clear day you can see Niechorze, Pogorzelica, Lake Liwia Łuża and the Baltic Sea for many kilometers. Because of the strong 1000W bulb during the night the light is visible from 20 miles away.
- Gardens around the lighthouse. Around the Niechorze lighthouse are landscaped gardens.
- Gryficka Kolej Wąskotorowa (Gryfice narrow-gauge railway) train line train line built in 1896. The train line links Niechorze with Gryfice, Trzebiatów, Trzęsacz, Rewal and Pogorzelica. The old, historic wagons on the train remind visitors of how the trains looked like back in the past. The train line operates a few times each day from June to September. When the train is not operating, there is also the Gryfickiej Kolei Wąskotorowej Museum in Gryfice.
- Old village centre, which consists of a few old buildings all grouped together. They are very old and show how Niechorze was like in the past.
- Fishing museum which shows the life of a fisherman in Niechorze, showing how he goes about in his daily life and the work that he does. There are also 2 new sections in the museum. One is about nature and life in the coral reefs and the other is about nature and life in and around the Baltic Sea.
- Ruins of Trzęsacz Church, located on a cliff between Trzęsacz and Niechorze. Unfortunately, historians predict that in a few years the remains of the church will collapse because of poor foundations.

=== Natural sights ===
- Lake Liwia Łuża, situated around 300m away from the beach next to Niechorze. The lake is connected to the Baltic Sea by a small canal called Liwka. The area around Lake Liwia Łuża is a nature reserve and houses many varieties of birds.
- Beach. Niechorze is famous for having a beautiful beach. In summer many tourists go to Niechorze to swim in the Baltic Sea and go for a walk along the beach. The area is also a good fishing spot and there is a jetty nearby.
- Forests. Surrounding the town of Niechorze are some forest reserves. There are many walking tracks in the forests, where tourists can visit. The forests are home to many animals and plants.

== Accommodation ==
There is a large variety of accommodation when staying in Niechorze, including guest houses, rest houses, private apartments, bivouacs and campsites.

== Depka ==
On the 18 July 2004 the beach in Niechorze became home to a Grey Seal from the Baltic Sea. The locals named the seal Depka and it can sometimes be seen swimming around nearby.
