= Artur Łącki =

Polish politician (born 1961)

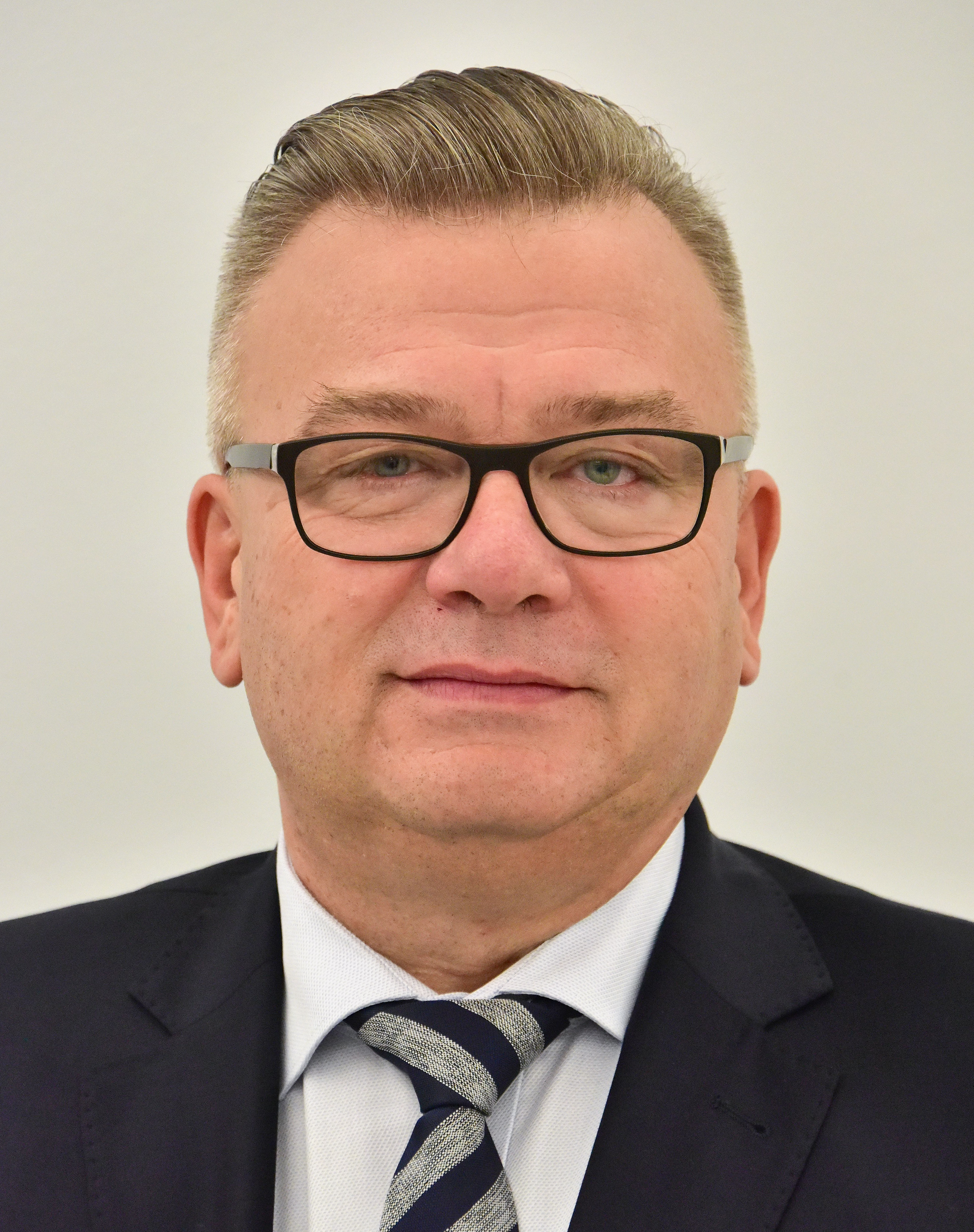
- Łącki in 2019.

Member of the Sejm of Poland
- Incumbent
- Assumed office 13 October 2019
- Constituency: No. 41

Member of the West Pomeranian Voivodeship Sejmik
- In office 2010–2023
- Constituency: No. 2

Member of the Gryfice County Council
- In office 2002–2010
- Constituency: No. 2 (2002–2006); No. 1 (2006–2010)

Member of the Rewal Municipal Council
- In office 1998–2002
- Constituency: No. 3

Member of the Rewal Village Council
- In office 1994–1998

Personal details
- Born: 5 December 1961 (age 64) Trzebiatów, Poland
- Party: Civic Coalition (since 2025)
- Other political affiliations: Civic Platform (until 2025)
- Education: University of Szczecin
- Occupation: Politician, businessperson

Artur Jarosław Łącki (Polish: [ˈar.tur jaˈrɔ.swaf ˈwɔnt͡s.ki]; born 5 December 1961) is a Polish politician and businessperson. Since 2019, he has served as a member of the Sejm of Poland. From 2010 to 2023, he was also a member of the West Pomeranian Voivodeship Sejmik. He is a member of the Civic Coalition party.

== Biography ==
Artur Łącki was born on 5 December 1961 in the town of Trzebiatów, now located within West Pomeranian Voivodeship, Poland, and grew up in the nearby town of Gryfice.

He graduated from the Bolesław the Brave General Education High School in Gryfice, and in 2001, he obtained a bachelor's degree in jurisprudence from the University of Szczecin. From 1982 to 2002, Łącki owned and operated a turist company in the village of Rewal. He was also a deputy chairperson of the West Pomeranian Football Association. From 1994 to 1998, he was a member of the council of Rewal, and from 1998 to 2002, a member of the council of the municipality of Rewal. From 2002 to 2010, he was a member of the council of Gryfice County. He was also member of its board of directors.

Łącki joined the Civic Platform party, becoming the leader of its branch in Gryfice County, and in 2003, becoming member of its board of directors of the West Pomeranian Voivodeship division. In 2005, he unsuccessfully ran for a seat in the Sejm of Poland, and in 2014, for a seat in the European Parliament. From 2010 to 2024, Łącki was a member of the West Pomeranian Voivodeship Sejmik, where he became the chairperson of the parliamentary group of the Civic Coalition. In 2019, he was elected to the Sejm of Poland, as a candidate of the Civic Coalition political alliance in the constituency no. 41, centered on Szczecin. He received 5,668 votes (1.20%). Łącki was reelected in 2023, with 6,100 votes (1,10%). Subsequently, he became the wealthiest member of the 10th term of the Sejm, with newspaper Fakt estimating his wealth at over 70 million zloties in 2023. During his term, he declared income from leasing, and employment as a marketing manager at a holiday resort. In 2025, the Civic Platform merged with two other parties, forming the Civic Coalition.

== Personal life ==
Artur Łącki resides in the village of Rewal, located within West Pomeranian Voivodeship, Poland.

== Electoral results ==
Year	Office		Party	Constituency	Votes			Result	Ref.
Year	Office		Party	Constituency	Total	%	P.	Result	Ref.
1994	Rewal Village Council		No data					Won	
1998	Rewal Municipal Council	1st	Electors' Electoral Committee; Local Government Electoral Committee Together	No. 3	114	7.98	4th	Won	
2002	Gryfice County Council	2nd	Local Government; Electoral Committee Together	No. 2	427	6.03	2nd	Won	
2005	Sejm of Poland	5th	Civic Platform	No. 41	1,583	1.82	45th	Lost	
2006	Gryfice County Council	3rd	Civic Platform	No. 1	189	1.77	12th	Won	
2010	West Pomeranian Voivodeship Sejmik	4th	Civic Platform	No. 2	6,422	6.98	5th	Won	
2014	European Parliament	8th	Civic Platform	No. 13	2,076	0.49	31st	Lost	
2014	West Pomeranian Voivodeship Sejmik	5th	Civic Platform	No. 2	4,972	6.17	3rd	Won	
2018	West Pomeranian Voivodeship Sejmik	6th	Civic Coalition	No. 2	10,048	9.90	2nd	Won	
2019	Sejm of Poland	9th	Civic Coalition	No. 41	5,668	1.20	20th	Won	
2023	Sejm of Poland	10th	Civic Coalition	No. 41	6,100	1.10	20th	Won	
