= Church of Saint Nicholas, Trzęsacz =

Ruins of the church in Trzęsacz
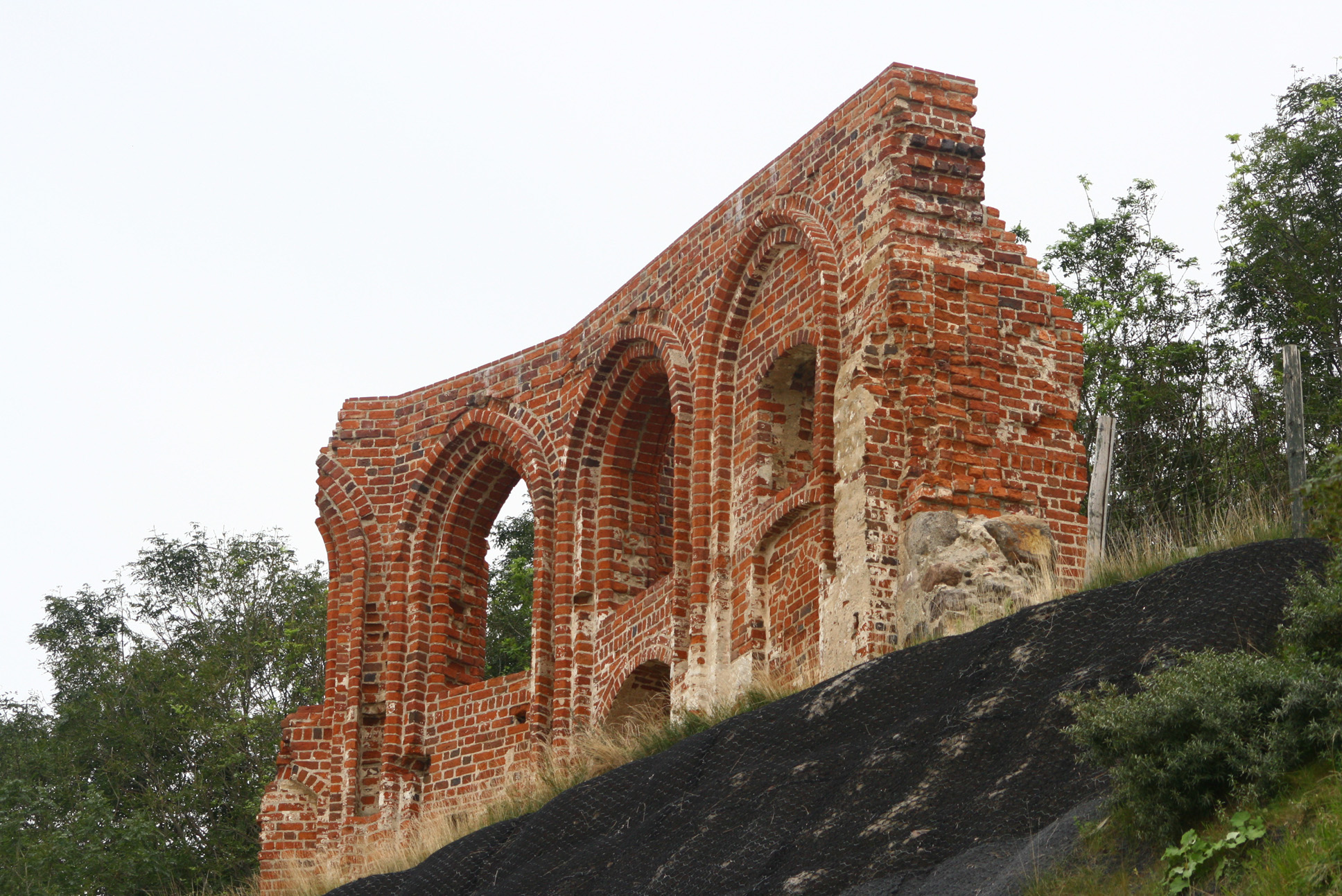
- Church in Trzęsacz

- Ruins of the church in Trzęsacz in Poland
- 54°04′40″N 14°59′34″E
- Location: Trzęsacz, Poland

History
- Built: 14th/15th century
- Demolished: 1901 (first wall collapsed)

Site notes
- Area: West Pomeranian Voivodeship
- Architectural style: Gothic

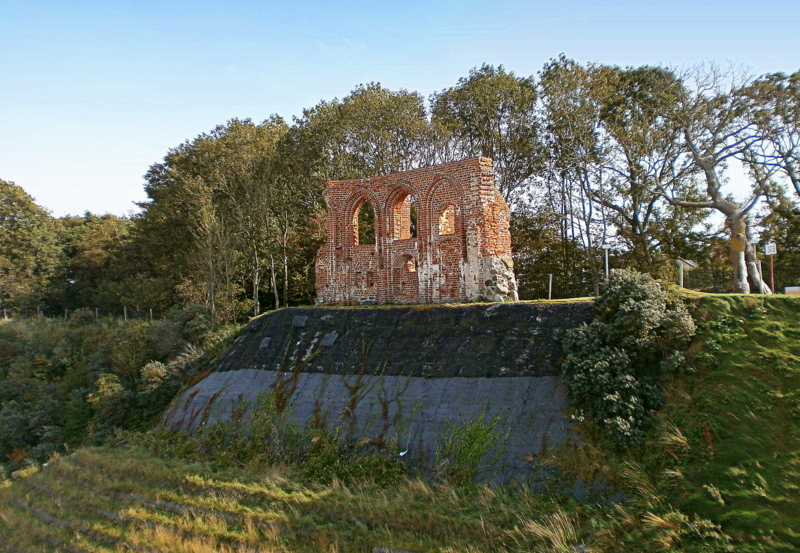
the church around 2012

The Church in Trzęsacz refers to a series of three churches built in Trzęsacz, Poland. The first, constructed of wood, was reportedly built in 1124; the second one, made of bricks, around 1270; and finally the third one, sometime in the late 14th or early 15th century. At that time, it was located almost two kilometers from the sea (according to many sources, 1800 meters). Furthermore, north of Trzęsacz there was another village, which had completely been taken over by water. Originally, the church was Roman Catholic, but in the early 16th century, after the Reformation, it became Protestant. According to some chronicles, it was the third Christian temple in Pomerania.

== Abrasion ==
Over time, the process of abrasion (more generally known as erosion) caused the land surrounding the church to recede at the expense of the Baltic Sea. Year by year, water would come closer; in 1750 the sea was as close as 58 meters, in 1771 parts of the cemetery were swallowed, and 1820 the distance shrank to 13 meters. Finally, on August 2, 1874, the last service took place in the temple. Afterwards, all furnishings were transported to the cathedral in Kamień Pomorski, with the exception of the triptych, which is now kept in a church in Rewal. By 1885 the temple stood over a chasm and, with permission of the Prussian government, it was deprived of the roof and left abandoned.

On the night of April 8–9, 1901 the most vulnerable, northern wall of the church collapsed. During the following years, part by part, most of the construction was swallowed by the sea, which mercilessly moves south, taking away the land. The last drop took place on February 1, 1994, when part of the southern wall collapsed.

According to scientists, since the turn of the 19th century the sea has taken around 40 centimeters of land a year. Over time, local governments – both Prussian and (after 1945) Polish – tried to save the temple with fascine and concrete blocks, but all attempts were unsuccessful. Currently, intensive works are taking place to save the ruin, as this is the only one of its kind in Europe. One of the projects stated that the last remains of the wall should be moved southwards, further away from the sea, but the risk of complete collapse of the ruin was too high.

== Photo gallery ==
History of the collapse

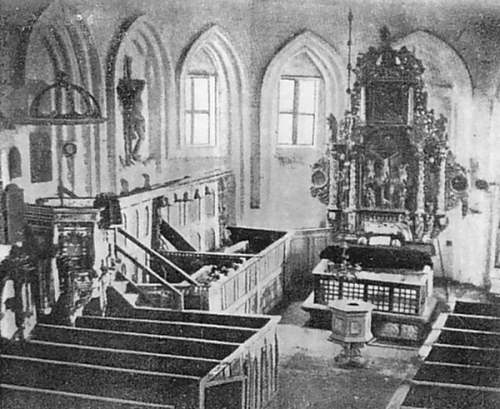
1870, the church inside

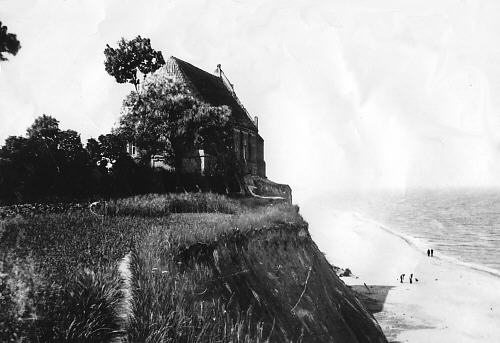
1870, the church outside, seen from east

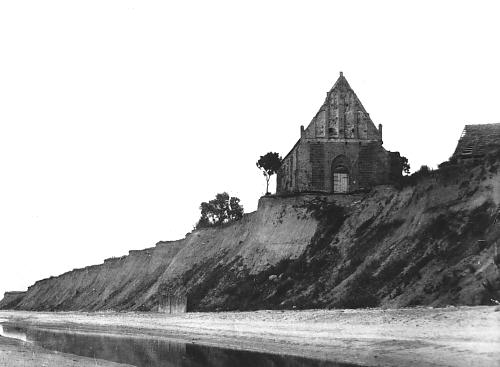
1870, the church outside, seen from west

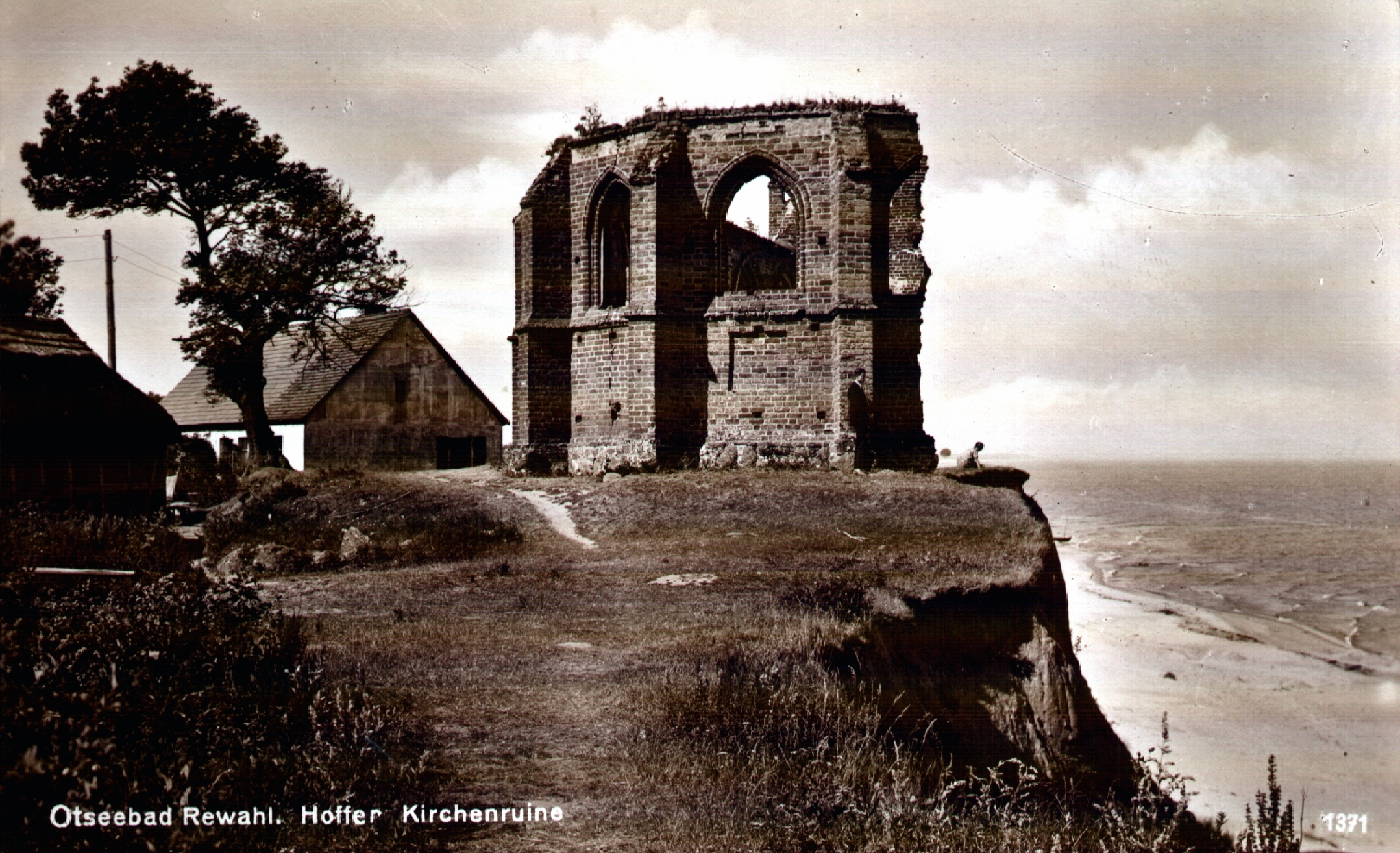
1930, seen from east

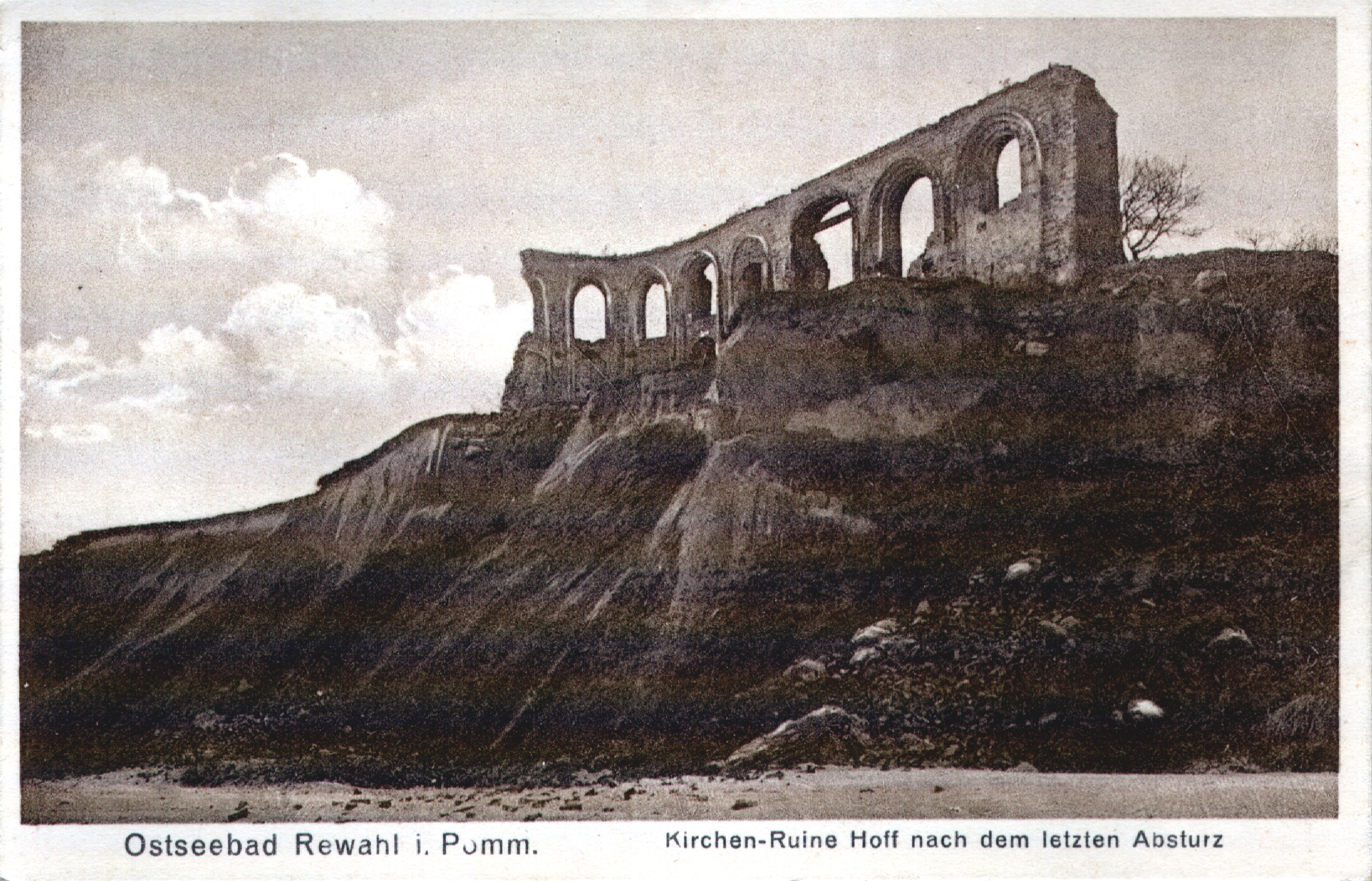
1930, seen from north-west

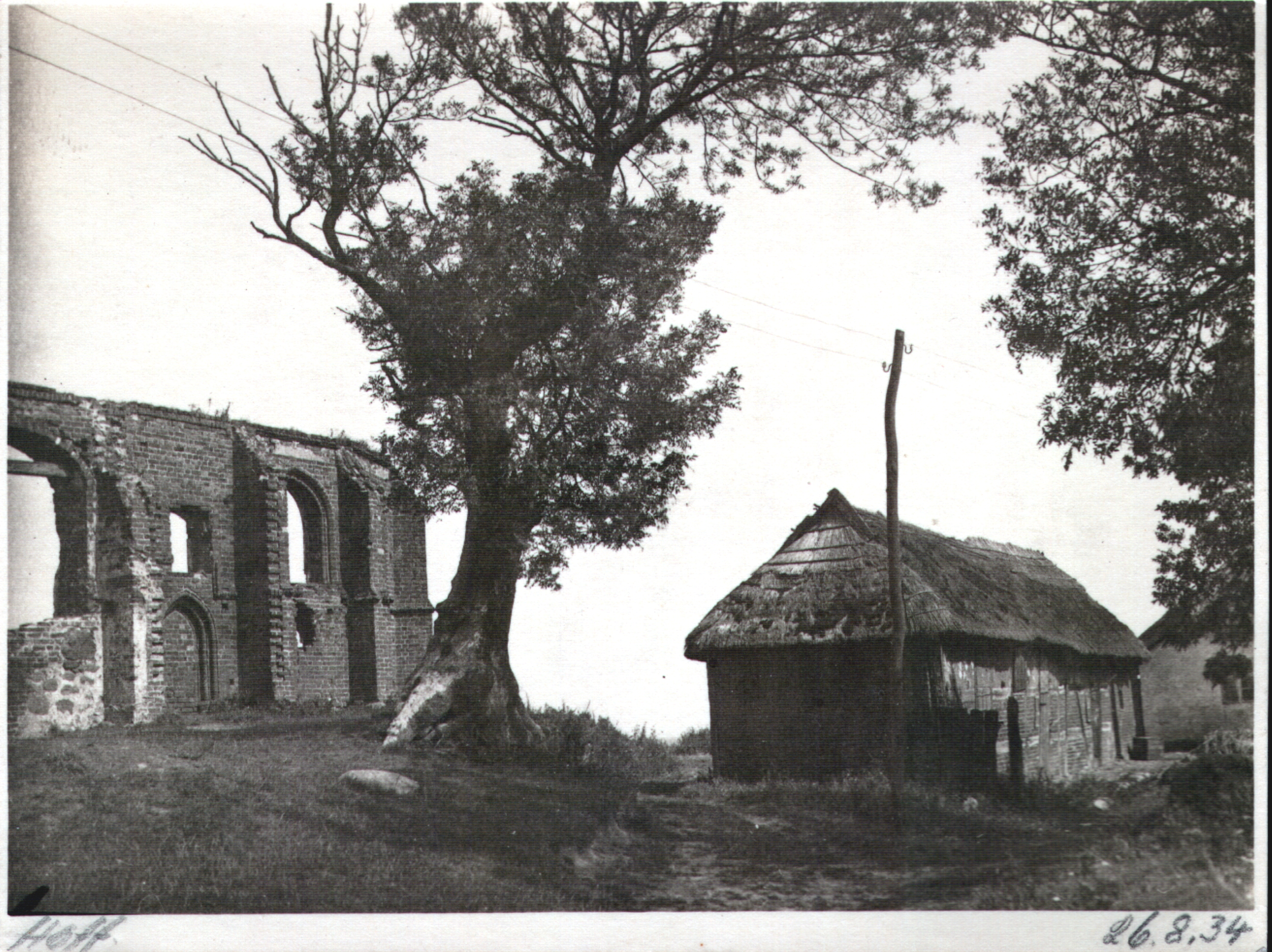
1934, seen from south-west

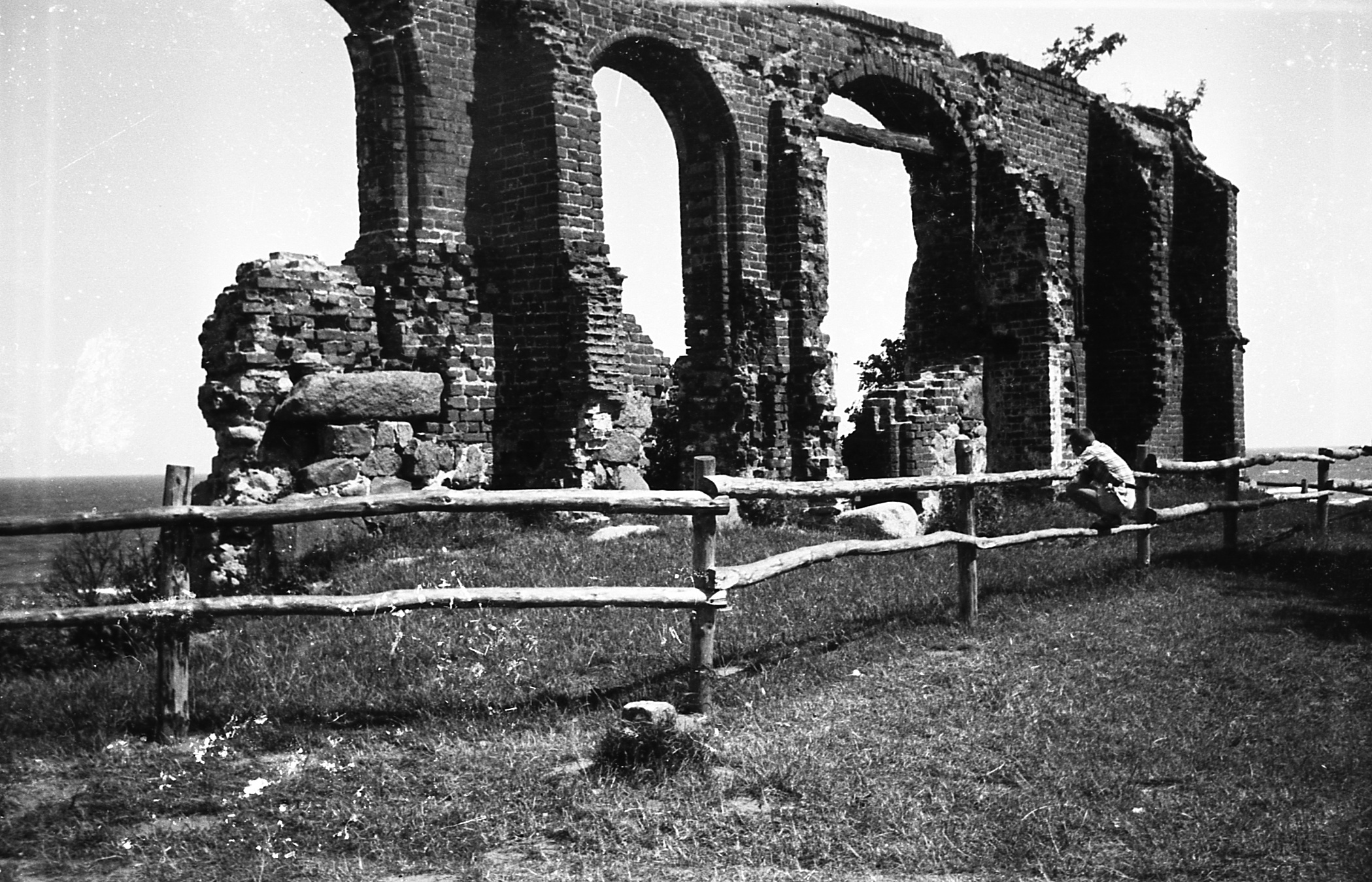
1965, seen from south-west

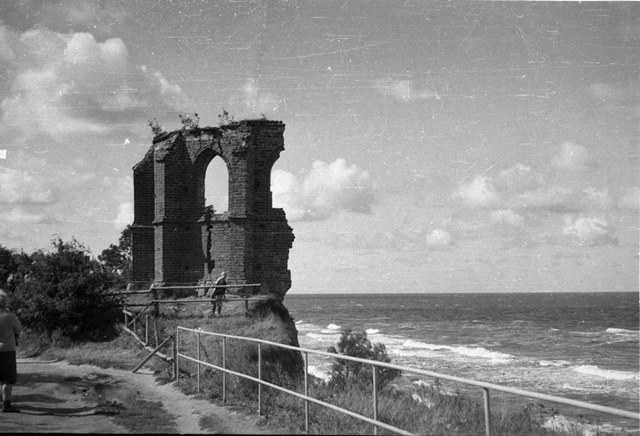
1971, seen from east

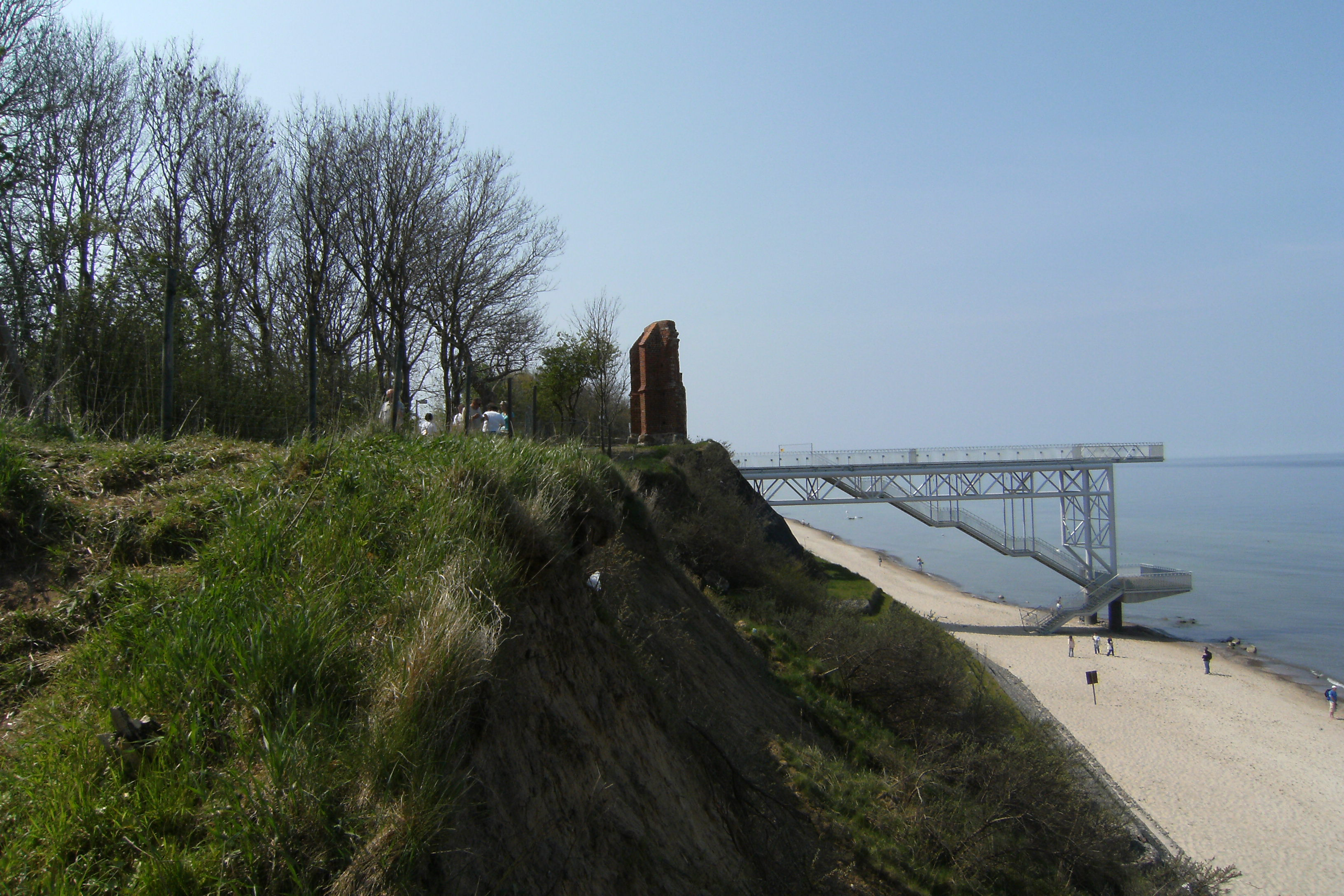
2009

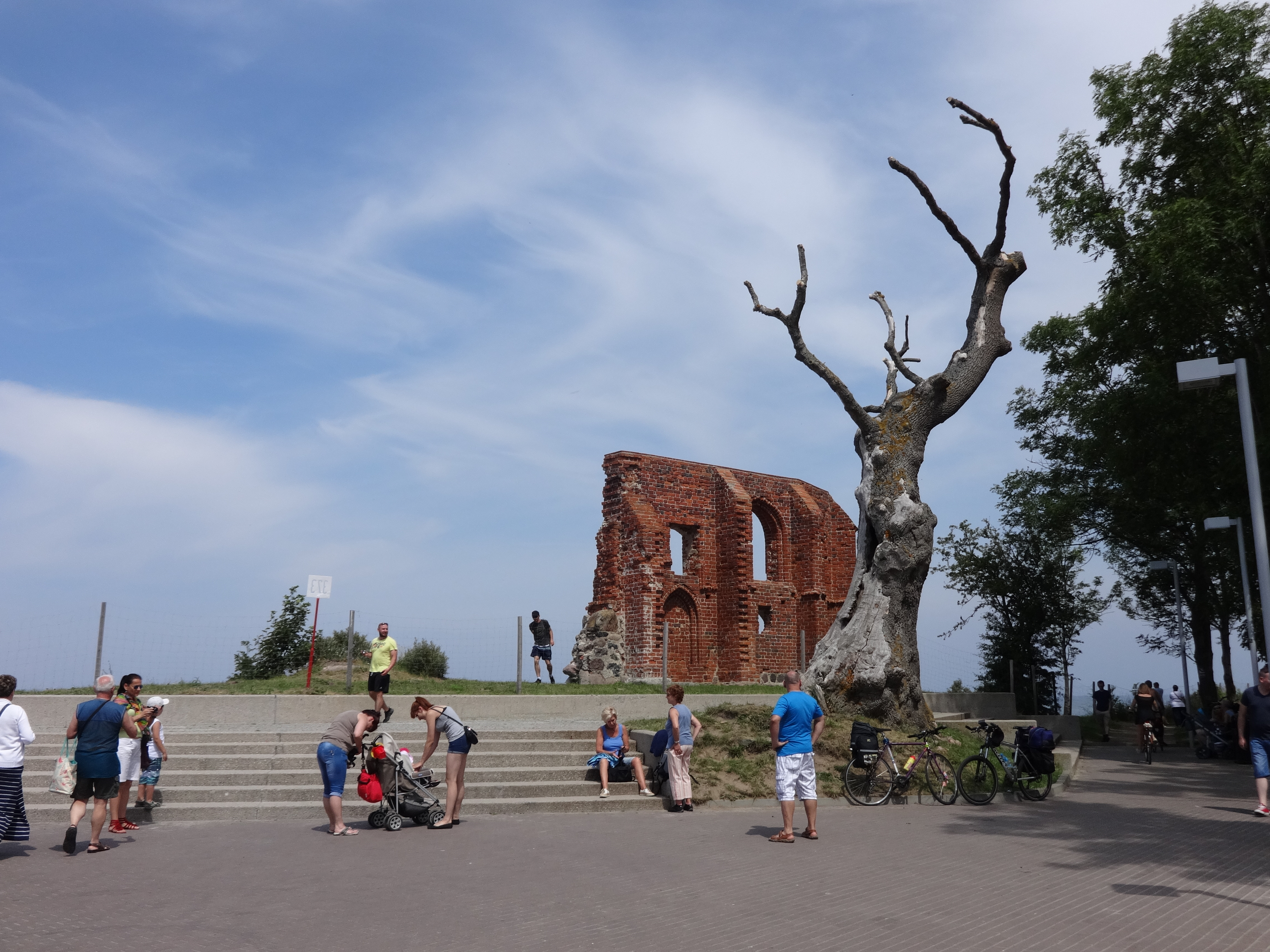
2014, seen from south-west

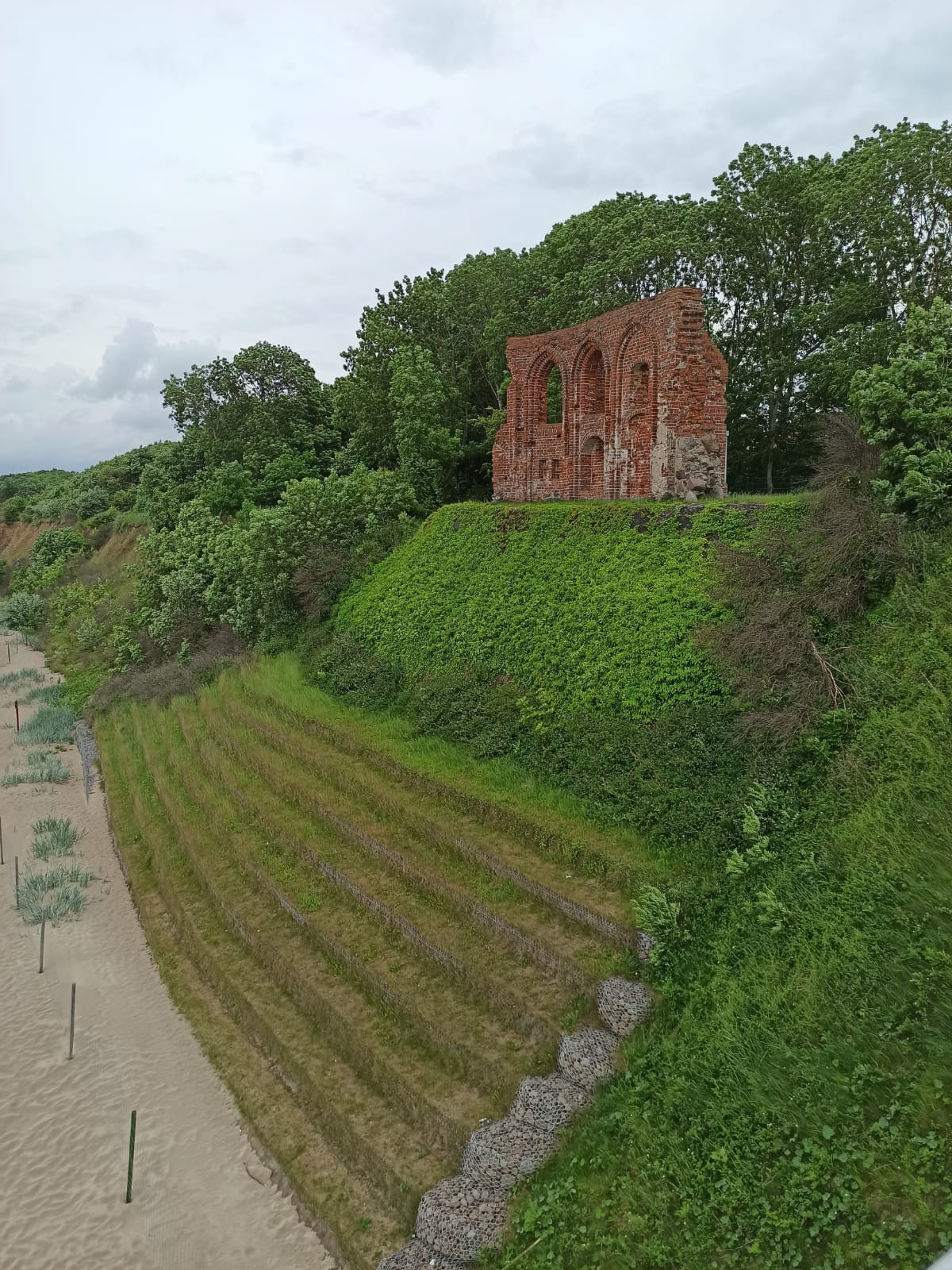
2021

== Sources ==
=== In Polish ===
- Schmidt, Ryszard. "Wybrzeże Rewalskie - Ruiny Kościoła w Trzęsaczu". www.wybrzeze-rewalskie.pl (in Polish). Archived from the original on 5 April 2023., a page about the church, together with historical photos
- "Trzęsacz Multimedialne Muzeum na 15 południku w Trzesaczu". muzeum-trzesacz.pl (in Polish). Archived from the original on 28 September 2007.
- "Trzęsacz". rewal.pl (in Polish). Archived from the original on 27 September 2007.
- 'Kroki', Akademicki Klub Turystyczny. "Ciekawe Miejsca". kroki.ps.pl (in Polish). Archived from the original on 12 January 2005.
- "Ruiny Kościoła w Trzęsaczu". Kasyno pieniężne w Polsce (in Polish). Archived from the original on 6 December 2024.

=== In German ===
- "Trzesac / Hoff und die Kirche am Kliff". ostsee-urlaub-polen.de (in German). Archived from the original on 23 August 2007.
- "Sehenswürdigkeiten". hs.ta.pl (in German). Archived from the original on 28 September 2007.
