= Trzebiatów Coast =

Trzebiatów Coast Wybrzeże Trzebiatowskie
- Polish Mesoregion
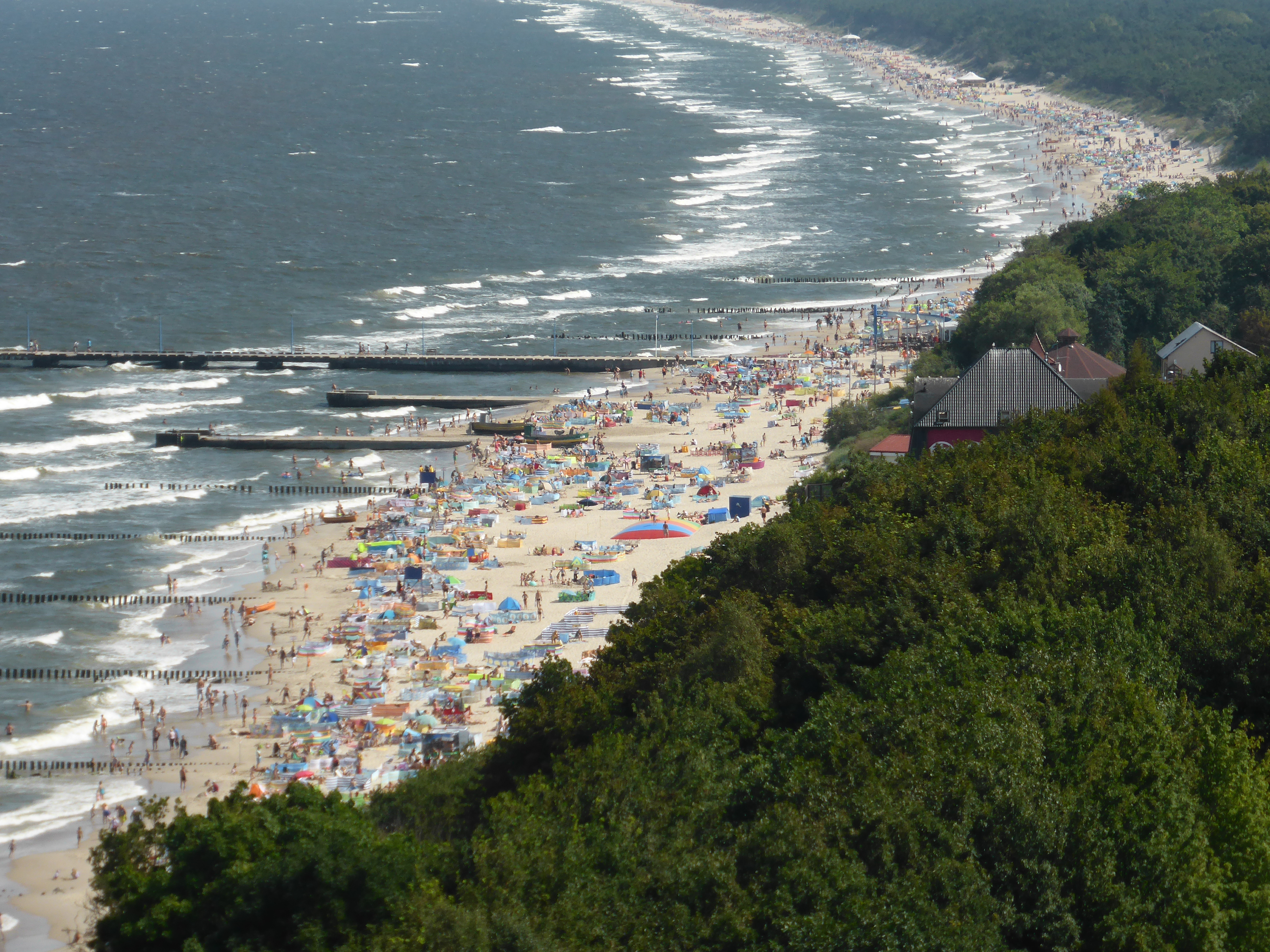
- Beach in Niechorze

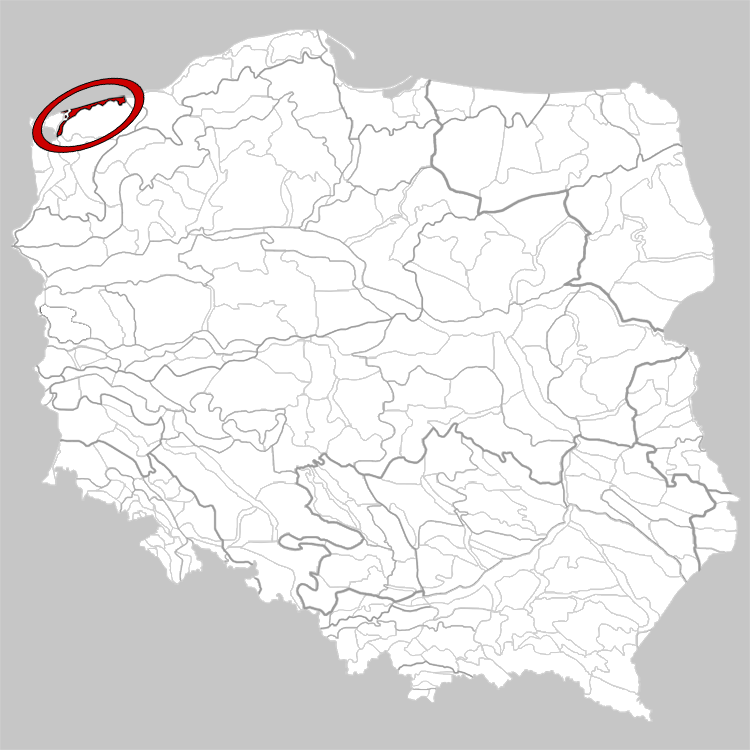
- The location of the Trzebiatów Coast
- Country: Poland
- Voivodeship: West Pomeranian Voivodeship

Area
  - Total: 290 km^{2} (110 sq mi)
- Time zone: UTC+1 (CET)
  - Summer (DST): UTC+2 (CEST)

The Trzebiatów Coast is a Polish mesoregion located on the Bay of Pomerania. It is 60 kilometres (37 mi) long and stretches from the Dziwna to Kołobrzeg. It has an area of 290 square kilometres (110 mi^{2}) and its shore is roughly 60 kilometres (37 mi) long.

The coast is known for its abundance of beaches, which are popular seaside resorts and summer tourist destinations in Poland. Such include (east to west): Dźwirzyno, Mrzeżyno, Pogorzelica, Niechorze, Rewal, Trzęsacz, Pustkowo, Pobierowo, Dziwnówek.
