= Pustkowo, Gryfice County =

Pustkowo
- Village
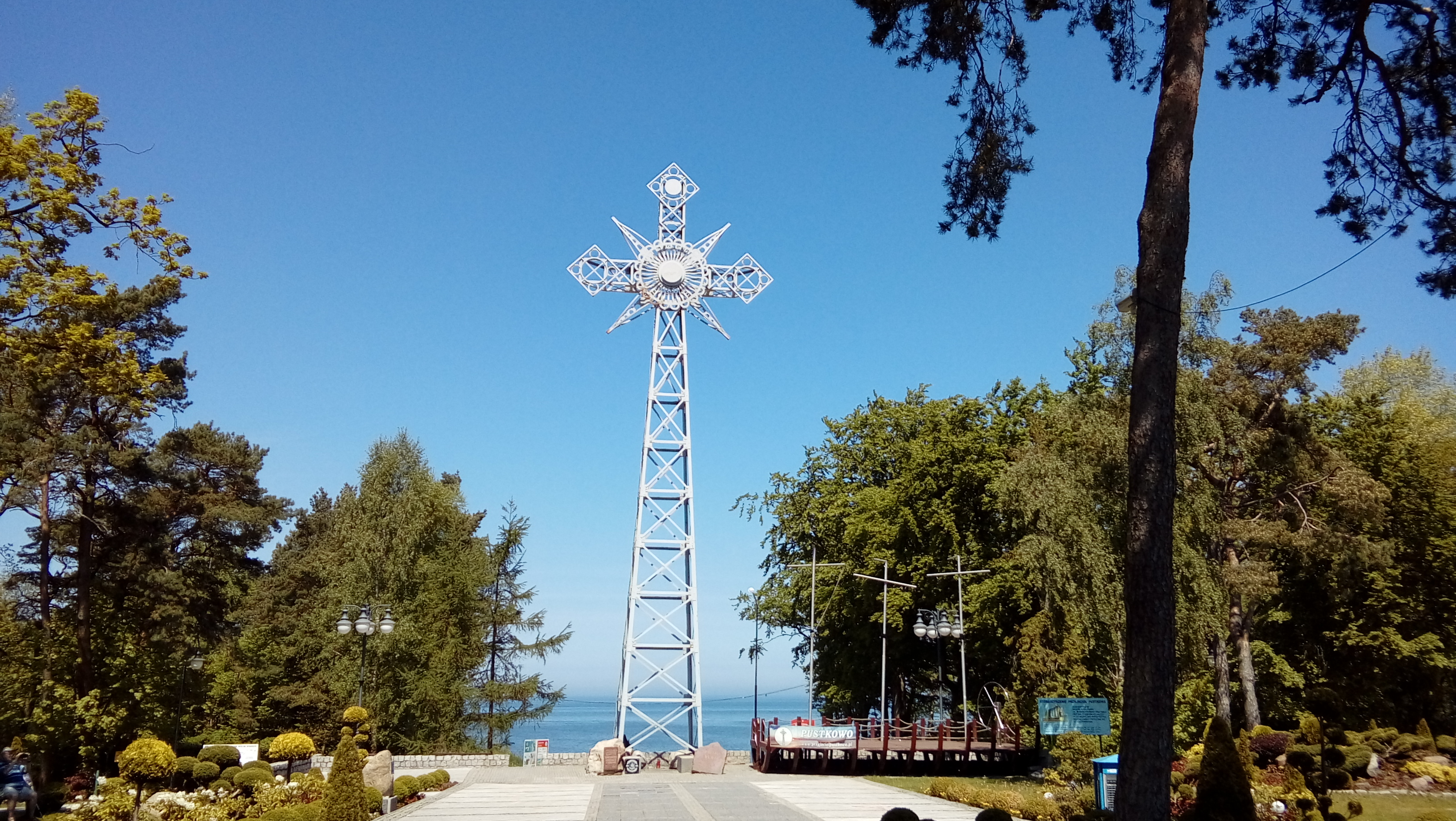
- Baltic Cross of Hope

- Location within Poland
- Coordinates: 54°4′5″N 14°58′8″E
- Country: Poland
- Voivodeship: West Pomeranian
- County: Gryfice
- Gmina: Rewal
- Population: 125
- Time zone: UTC+1 (CET)
  - Summer (DST): UTC+2 (CEST)
- Vehicle registration: ZGY
- Website: http://www.rewal.pl/pustkowo/pustkowo.htm

Pustkowo [pustˈkɔvɔ] (German: Pustchow) is a village in the administrative district of Gmina Rewal, within Gryfice County, West Pomeranian Voivodeship, in north-western Poland. It lies approximately 4 km (2 mi) south-west of Rewal, 23 km (14 mi) north-west of Gryfice, and 77 km (48 mi) north of the regional capital Szczecin. It is located on the Trzebiatowski Coast in the historic region of Pomerania.

The village has a population of 125 (as of 2010).

== Gallery ==
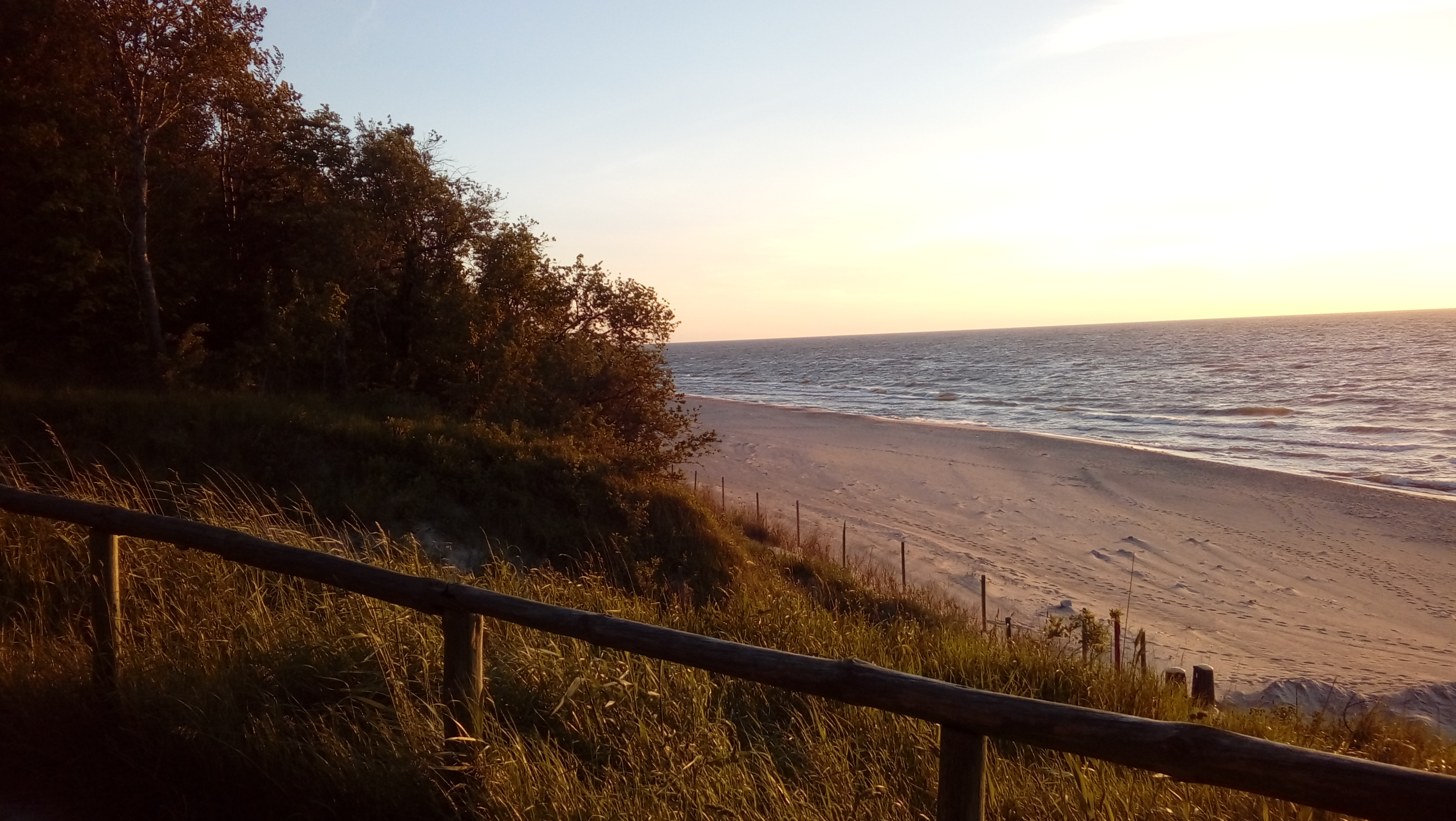
Pustkowo beach

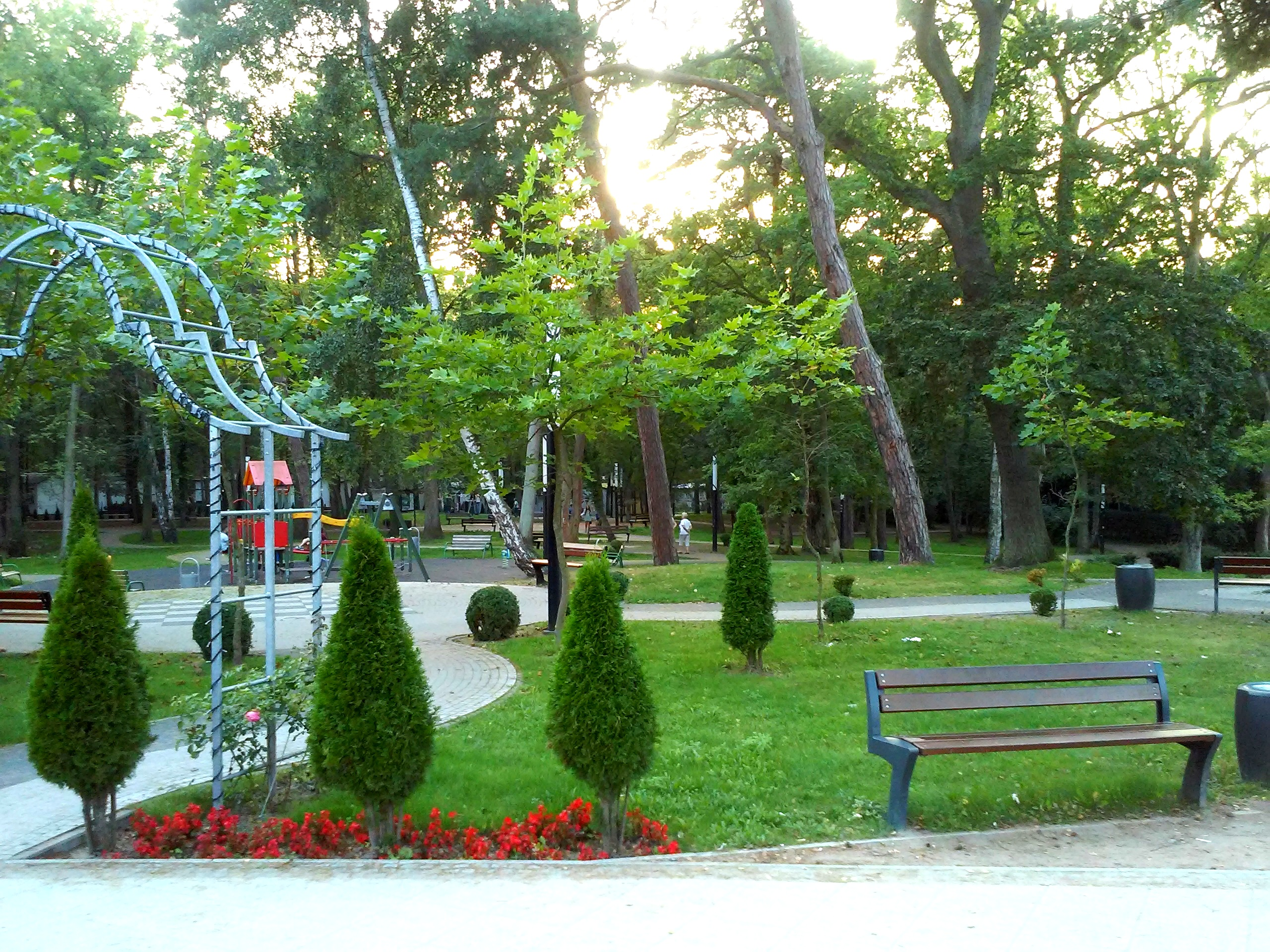
Park

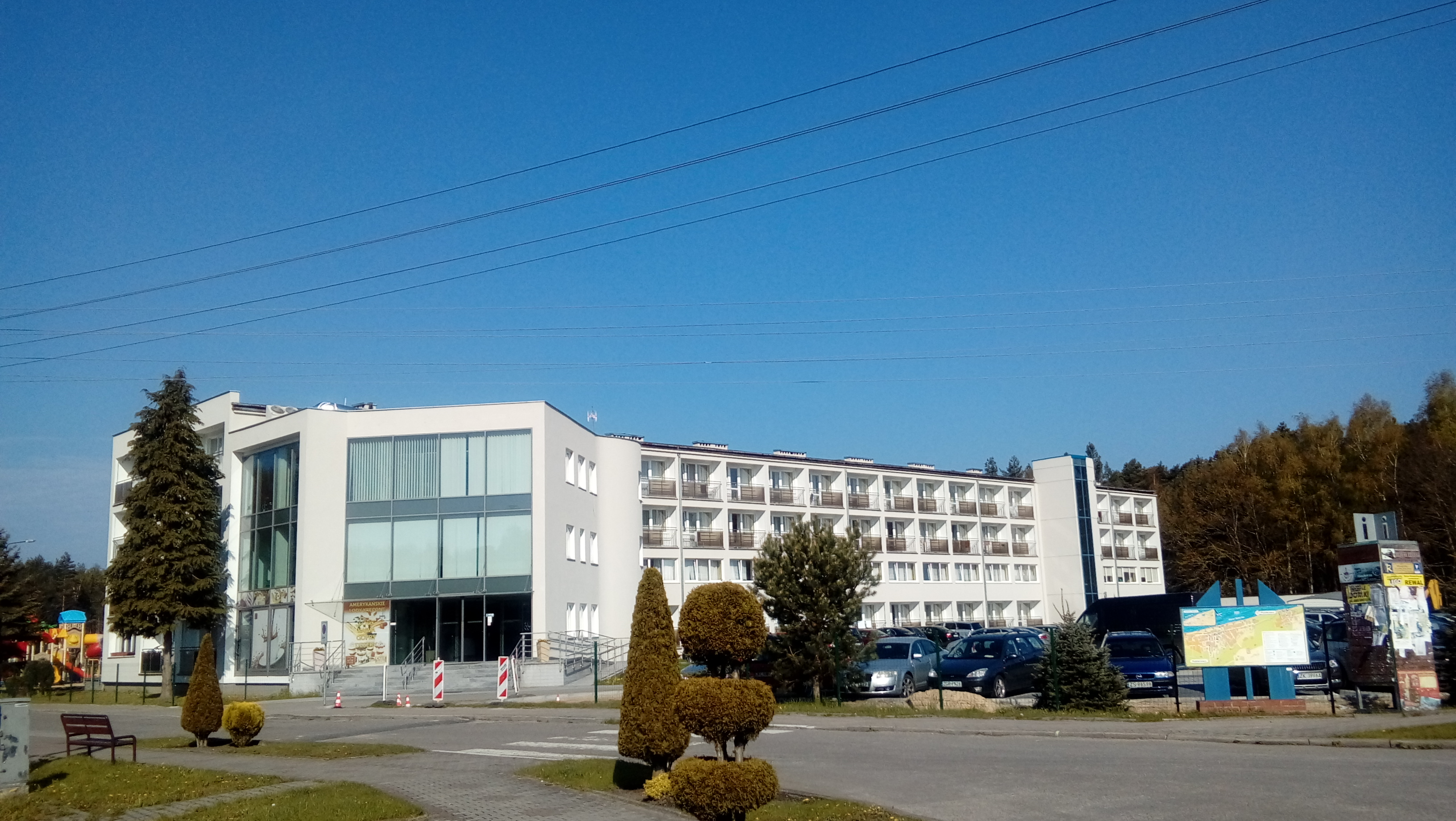
Resort

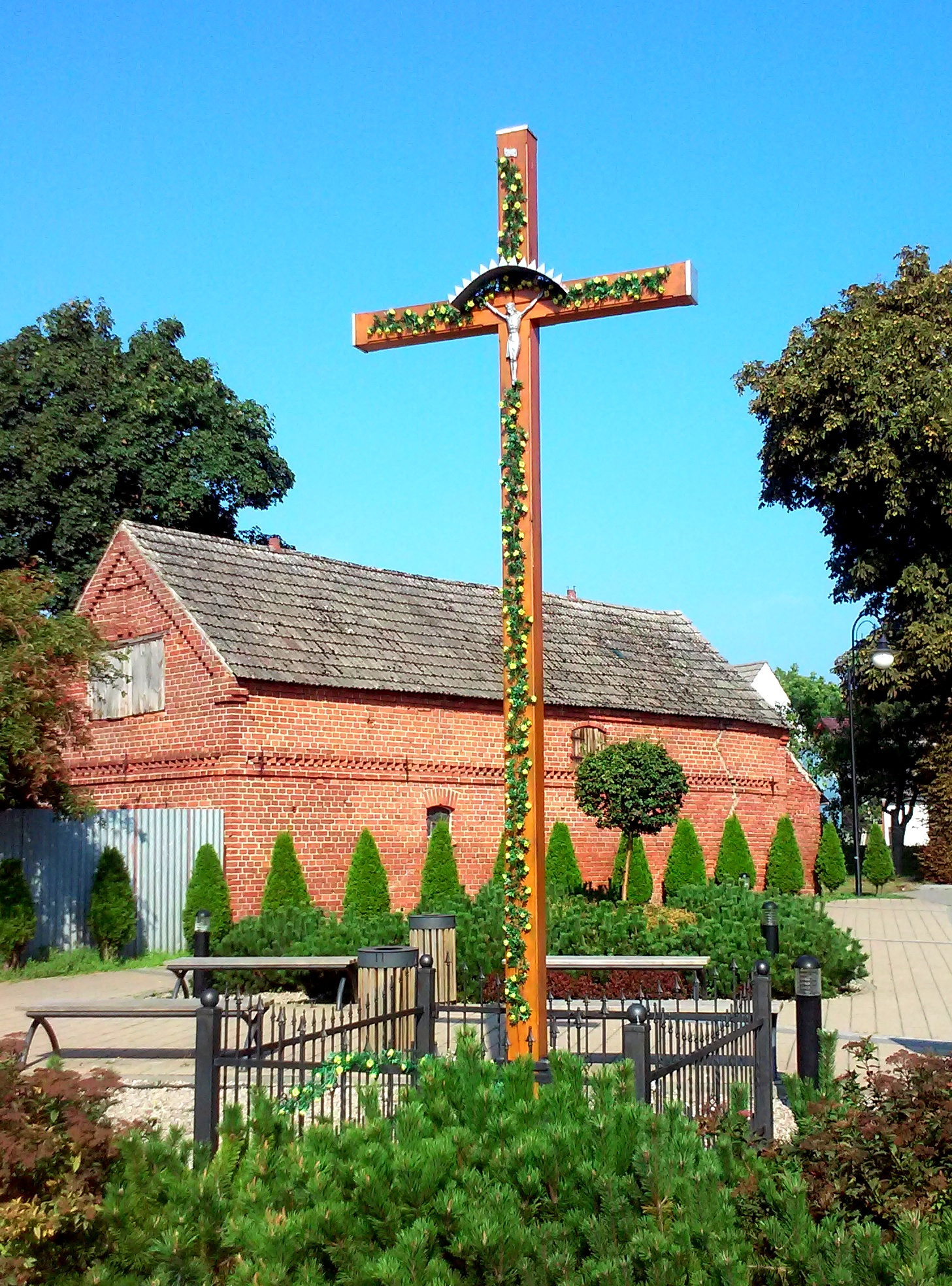
Wayside cross
