= Pogorzelica, Gmina Rewal =

Pogorzelica
- Village
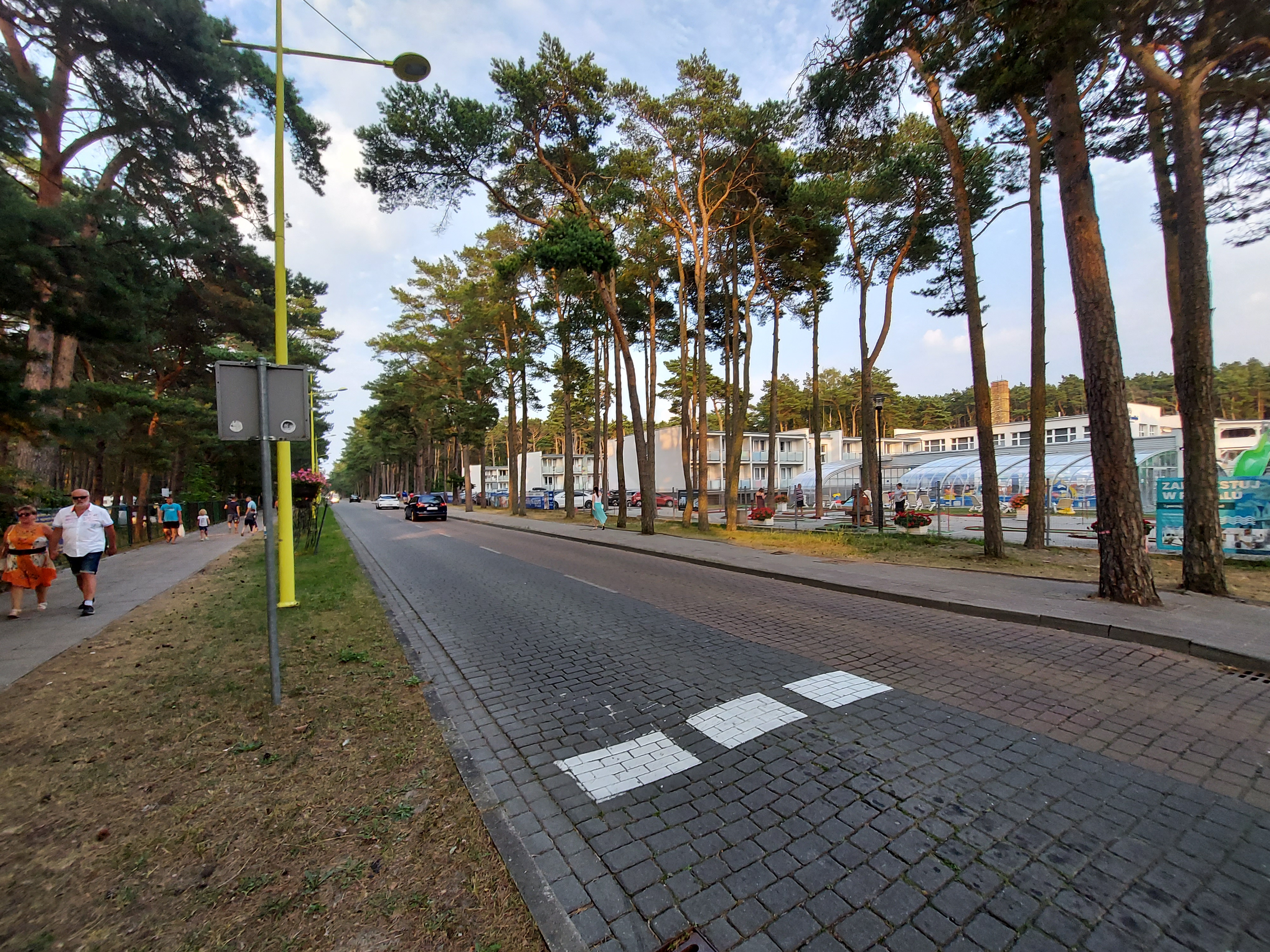
- Wojska Polskiego Street in Pogorzelica

- Location within Poland
- Coordinates: 54°6′9″N 15°7′13″E
- Country: Poland
- Voivodeship: West Pomeranian
- County: Gryfice
- Gmina: Rewal
- Population: 119
- Time zone: UTC+1 (CET)
  - Summer (DST): UTC+2 (CEST)
- Vehicle registration: ZGY

Pogorzelica [pɔɡɔʐɛˈlit͡sa] (German: Fischerkaten) is a village in the administrative district of Gmina Rewal, within Gryfice County, West Pomeranian Voivodeship, in northwestern Poland. It lies approximately 7 km (4 mi) east of Rewal, 22 km (14 mi) north of Gryfice, and 84 km (52 mi) northeast of the regional capital Szczecin. Situated on the Trzebiatowski Coast of the Baltic Sea in the historic region of Pomerania, the village has a beach and is a holiday resort.

It borders with the village of Niechorze in the west, and Pogorzelica, Gmina Karnice in the south.

The village has a population of 119.

== Gallery ==
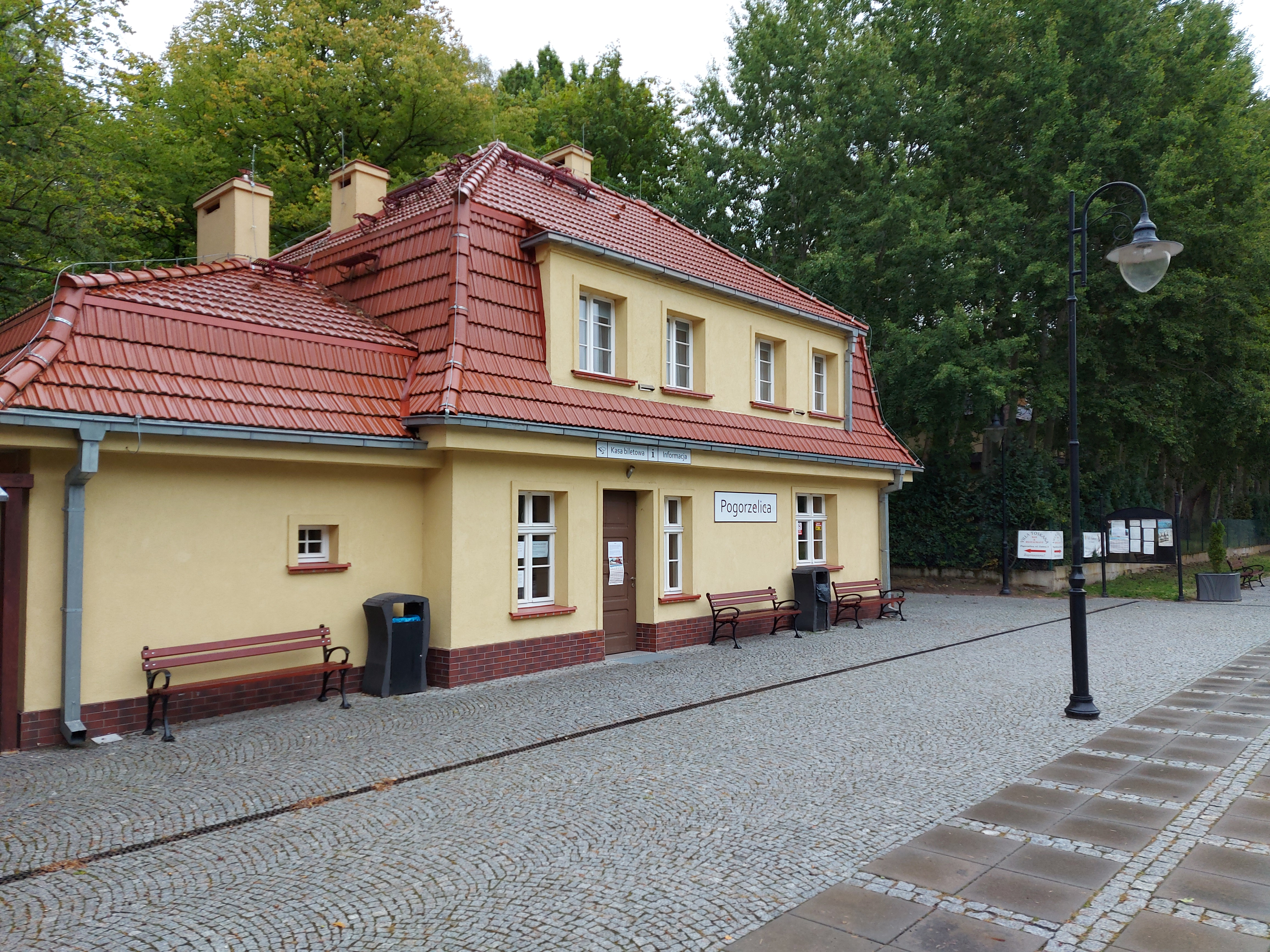
Narrow-gauge railway station

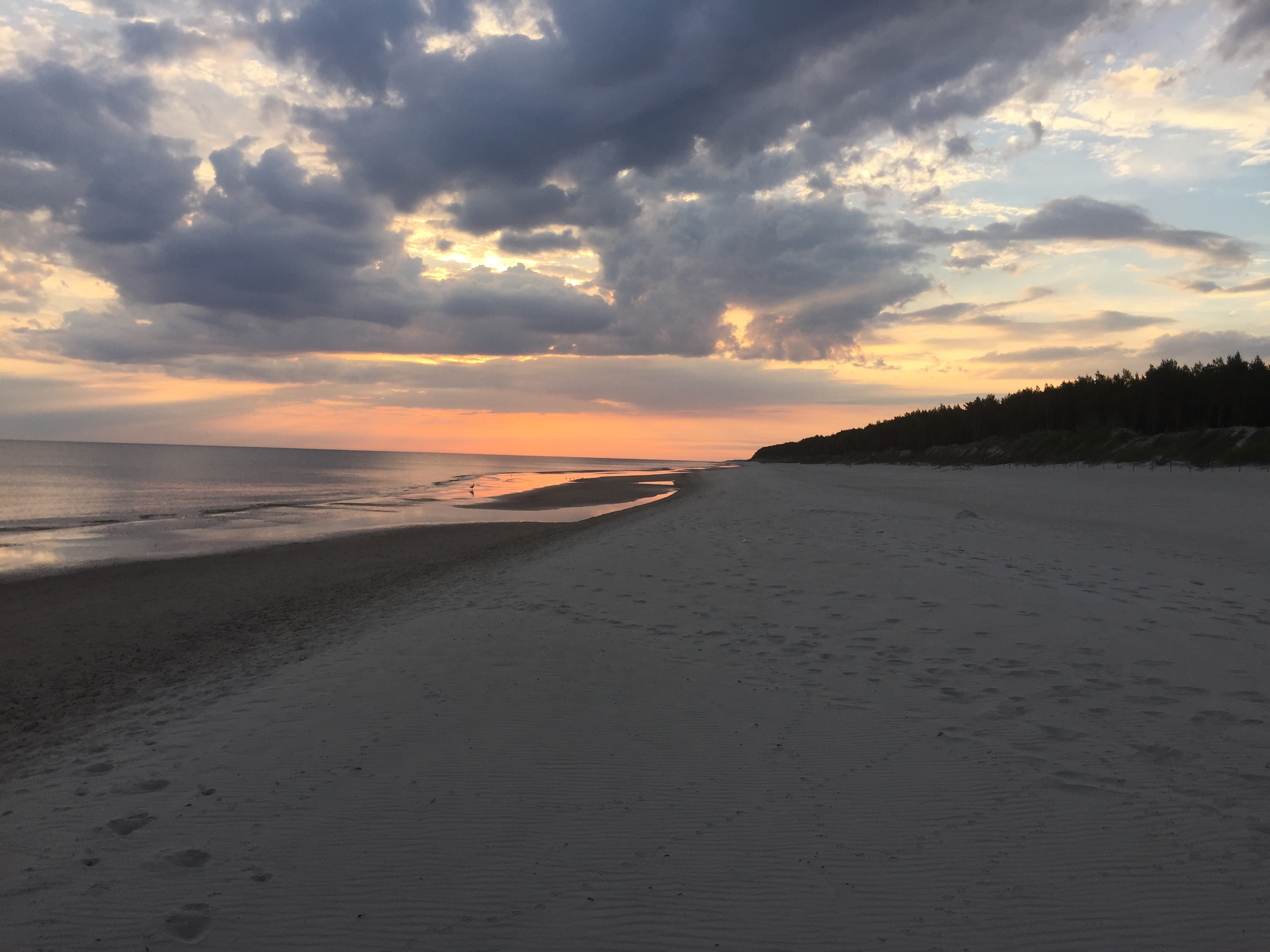
Pogorzelica beach in the evening

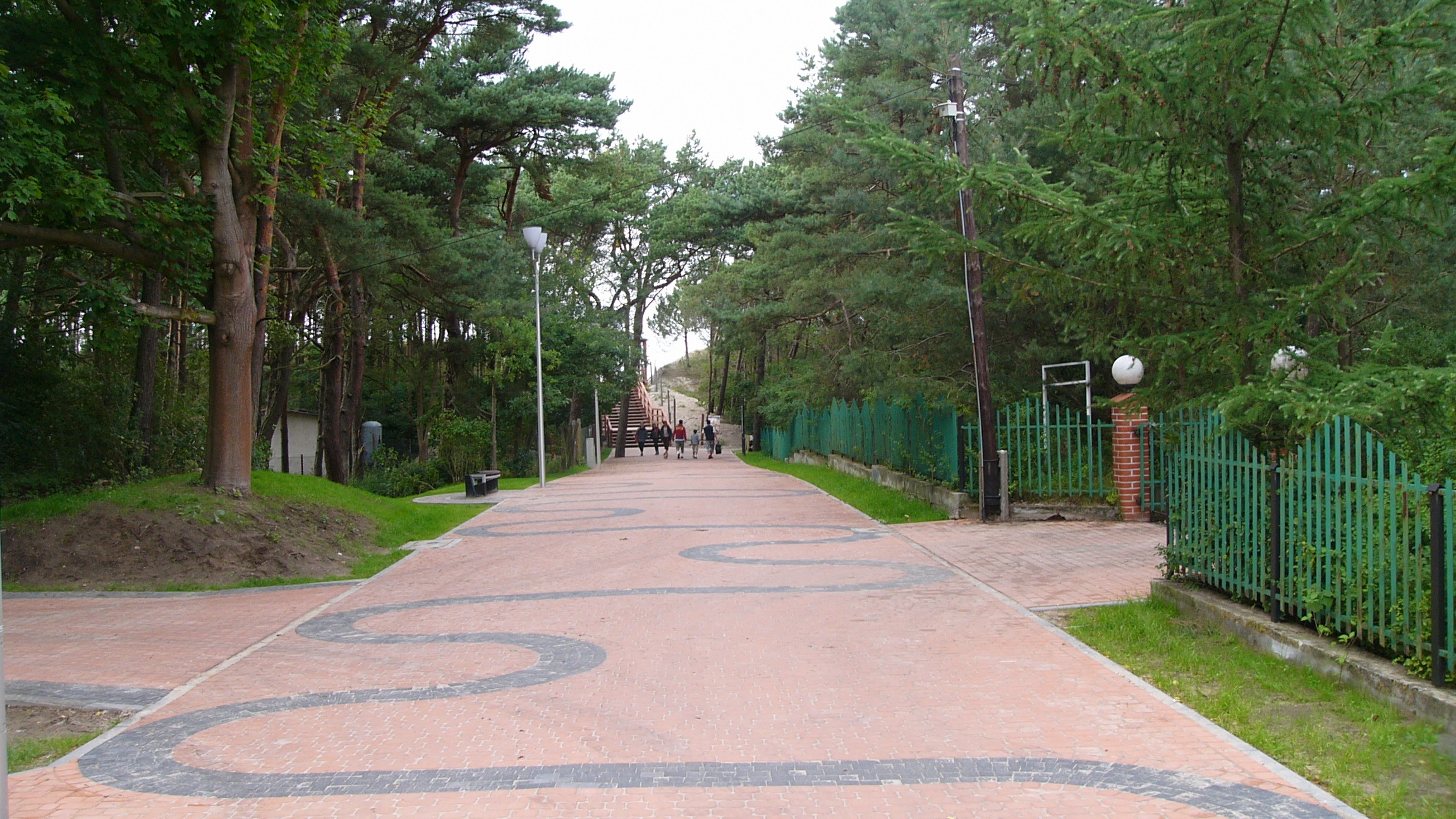
Boardwalk

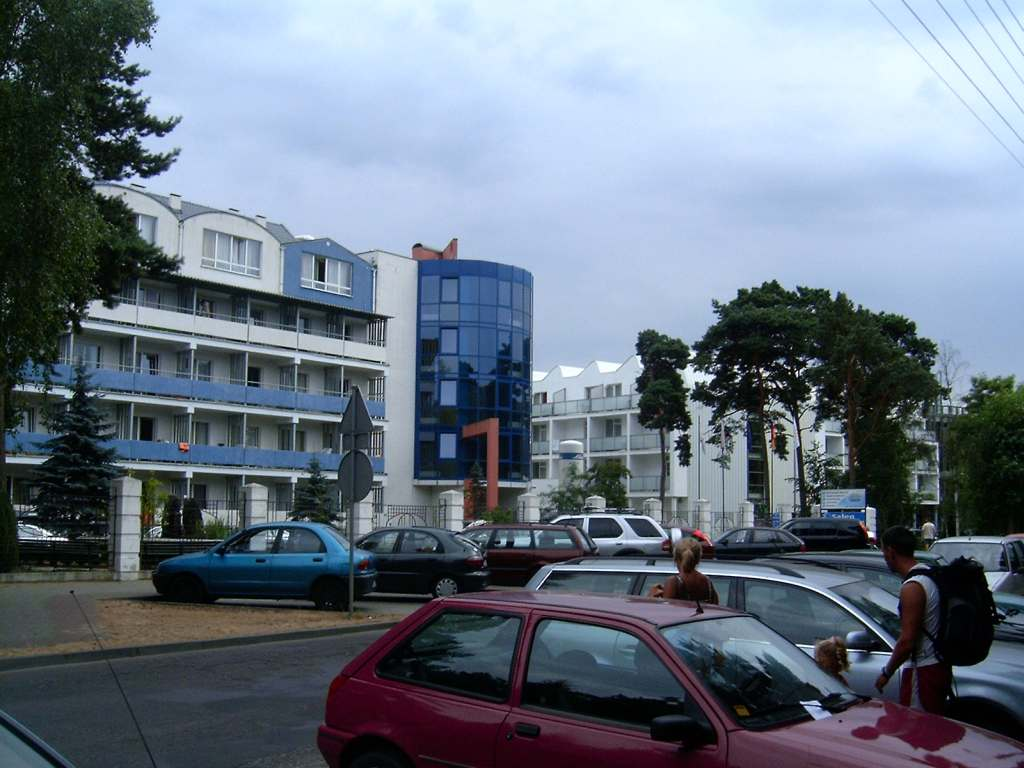
Holiday resorts
