= Śliwin =

- Village
- Location within Poland
- Coordinates: 54°4′21″N 15°2′3″E
- Country: Poland
- Voivodeship: West Pomeranian
- County: Gryfice
- Gmina: Rewal
- Population: 224
- Website: http://www.rewal.pl/sliwin/sliwin.htm

Śliwin [ˈɕlivin] (German: Schleffin) is a village in the administrative district of Gmina Rewal, within Gryfice County, West Pomeranian Voivodeship, in north-western Poland. It lies approximately 2 km (1 mi) south-east of Rewal, 21 km (13 mi) north-west of Gryfice, and 79 km (49 mi) north of the regional capital Szczecin.

The village has a population of 224.
