= Pobierowo =

- Village
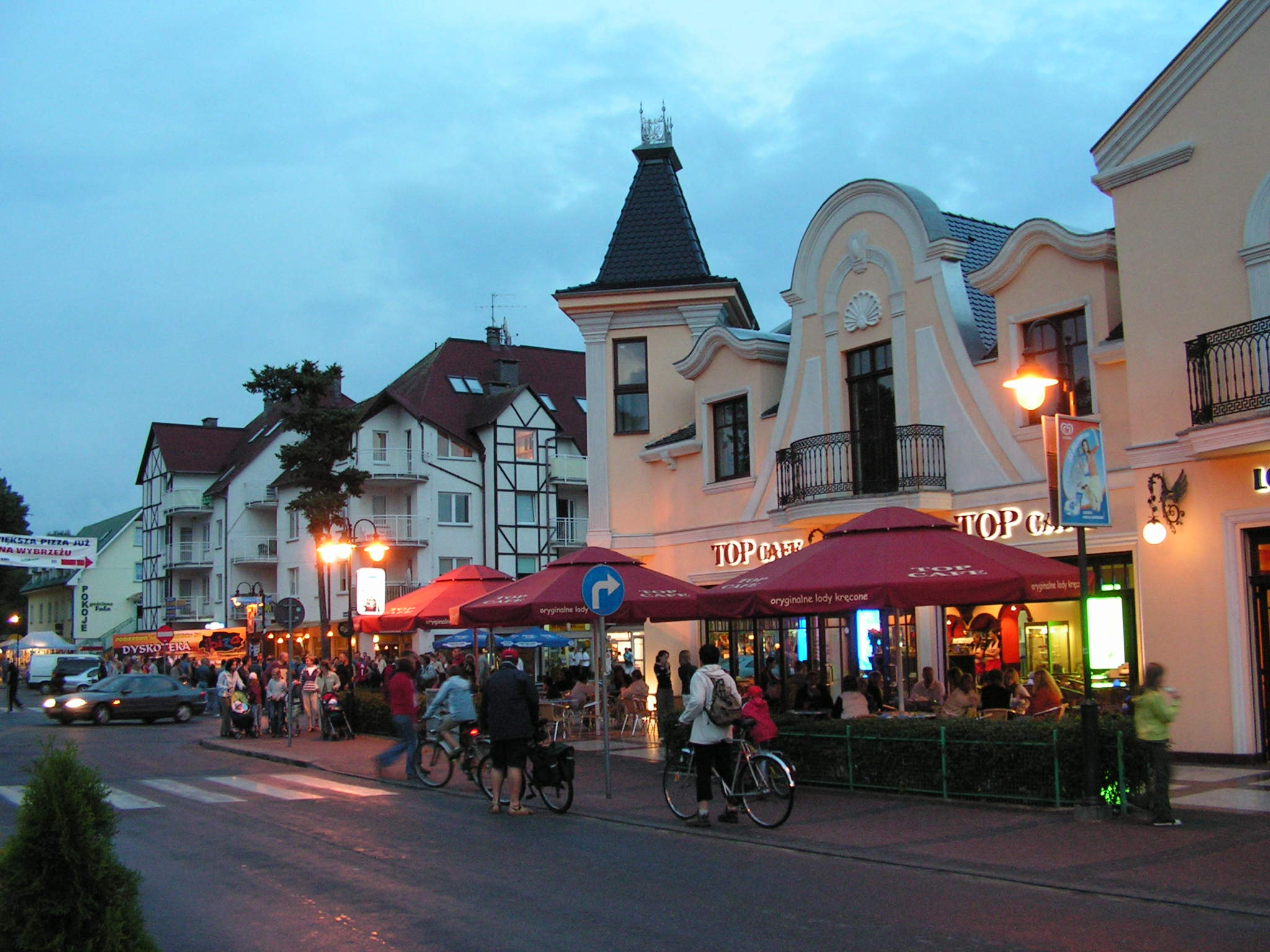
- Centre of the village

- Location within Poland
- Coordinates: 54°3′26″N 14°55′41″E
- Country: Poland
- Voivodeship: West Pomeranian
- County: Gryfice
- Gmina: Rewal
- Population: 1,084

Pobierowo [pɔbjɛˈrɔvɔ] (German: Poberow) is a village in the administrative district of Gmina Rewal, within Gryfice County, West Pomeranian Voivodeship, in north-western Poland. It lies approximately 7 km (4 mi) south-west of Rewal, 24 km (15 mi) north-west of Gryfice, and 75 km (47 mi) north of the regional capital Szczecin.

For the history of the region, see History of Pomerania. In the forest on the western side of the village stands an abandoned house where Eva Braun lived in the 1930s.

The village has a population of 1,084.
