= Trzęsacz, Gryfice County =

Trzęsacz
- Village
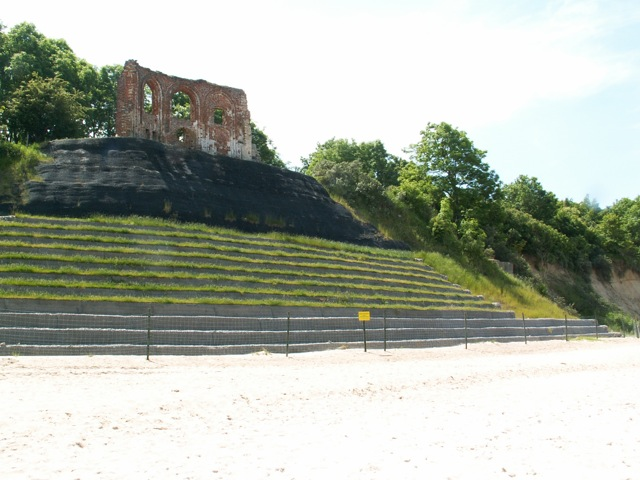
- Ruins of the church in Trzęsacz

- Location within Poland
- Coordinates: 54°4′40″N 14°59′34″E
- Country: Poland
- Voivodeship: West Pomeranian
- County: Gryfice
- Gmina: Rewal
- Population: 89
- Website: http://www.rewal.pl/trzesacz/trzesacz.htm

Trzęsacz [ˈtʂɛ̃sat͡ʂ] (German: Hoff an der Ostsee) is a village in the administrative district of Gmina Rewal, within Gryfice County, West Pomeranian Voivodeship, in north-western Poland. It lies on the Baltic coast, approximately 2 km (1 mi) west of Rewal, 23 km (14 mi) north-west of Gryfice, and 79 km (49 mi) north of the regional capital Szczecin.

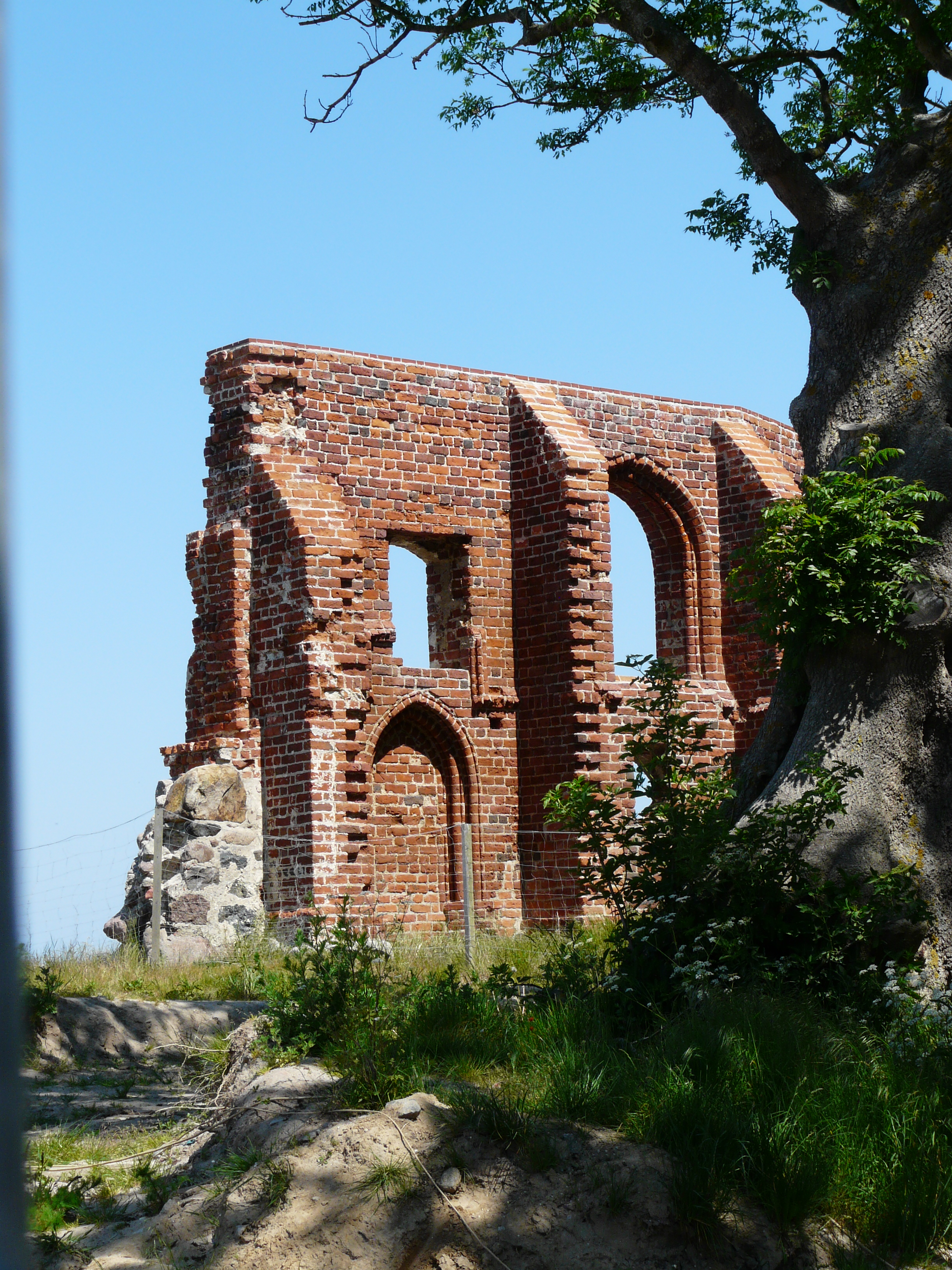
Ruins of the church in Trzęsacz

For the history of the region, see History of Pomerania and History of Gryfice.

The village has a population of 89. It is a tourist center, famous for its ancient church, which has been reduced over the ages to a lone southern wall.

== Notable residents ==
- Jacob Heinrich von Flemming (1667–1728), military officer and politician
