= Gmina Rewal =

Gmina Rewal Rewal Commune
- Gmina
- Flag Coat of arms

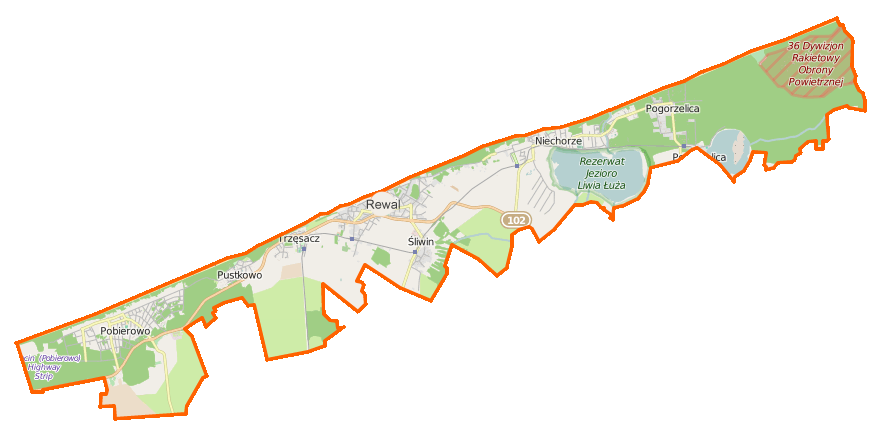
- Coordinates (Rewal): 54°4′57″N 15°1′7″E
- Country: Poland
- Voivodeship: West Pomeranian
- County: Gryfice
- Seat: Rewal

Area
  - Total: 41.13 km^{2} (15.88 sq mi)

Population (2022)
  - Total: 3,558
  - Density: 86.51/km^{2} (224.1/sq mi)
- Website: http://www.rewal.pl/

Gmina Rewal is a rural gmina (administrative district) in Gryfice County, West Pomeranian Voivodeship, in north-western Poland. Its seat is the village of Rewal, which lies approximately 23 kilometres (14 mi) north-west of Gryfice and 80 km (50 mi) north of the regional capital Szczecin.

The gmina covers an area of 41.13 square kilometres (15.9 sq mi), and as of December 2022 the population is 3558

== Villages ==
Gmina Rewal contains the villages and settlements of Niechorze, Pobierowo, Pogorzelica, Pustkowo, Rewal, Śliwin and Trzęsacz.

== Neighbouring gminas ==
Gmina Rewal is bordered by the gminas of Dziwnów, Karnice, Świerzno and Trzebiatów.
