= Zagórze, Kamień County =

Zagórze
- Village
- Location within Poland
- Coordinates: 53°48′39″N 14°36′48″E
- Country: Poland
- Voivodeship: West Pomeranian
- County: Kamień
- Gmina: Wolin
- Population: 180

Zagórze [zaˈɡuʐɛ] (German Sager) is a village in the administrative district of Gmina Wolin, within Kamień County, West Pomeranian Voivodeship, in north-western Poland. It lies approximately 4 km (2 mi) south of Wolin, 21 km (13 mi) south-west of Kamień Pomorski, and 44 km (27 mi) north of the regional capital Szczecin.

The village has a population of 180.
