= Rewal =

- Village
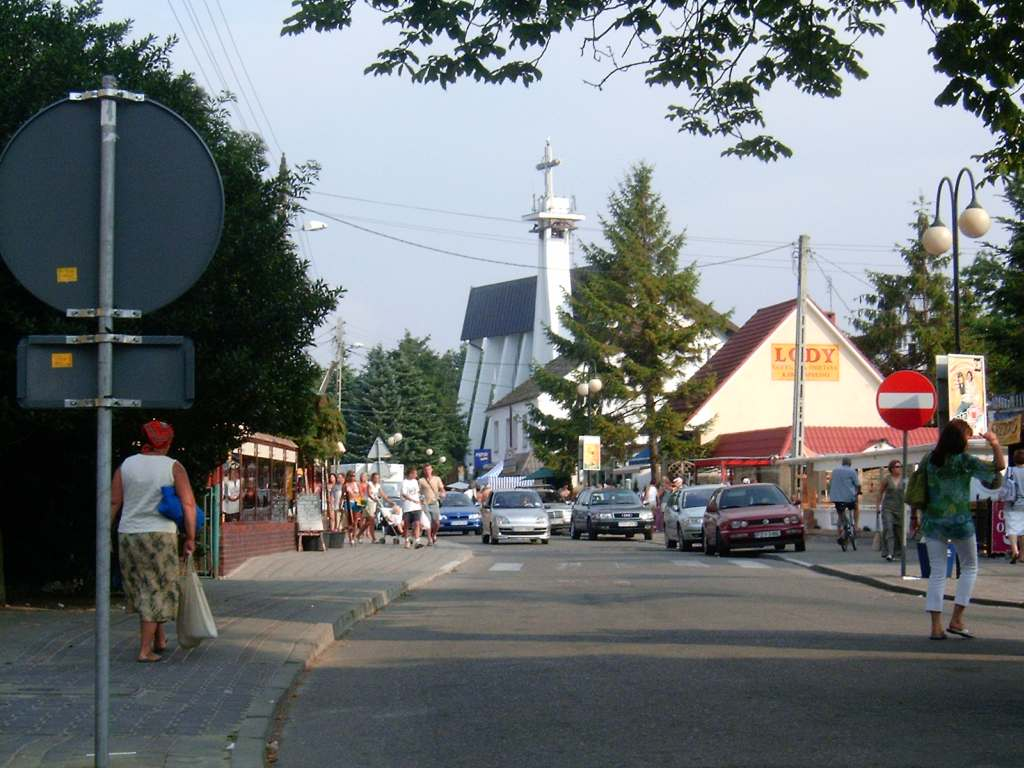
- Street in Rewal

- Flag Coat of arms

- Location within Poland
- Coordinates: 54°4′57″N 15°1′7″E
- Country: Poland
- Voivodeship: West Pomeranian
- County: Gryfice
- Gmina: Rewal

Population
  - Total: 893
- Website: http://www.rewal.pl/

Rewal [ˈrɛval] (German: Rewahl) is a village in Gryfice County, West Pomeranian Voivodeship, in north-western Poland. It is the seat of the gmina (administrative district) called Gmina Rewal. It lies approximately 23 km (14 mi) north-west of Gryfice and 80 km (50 mi) north of the regional capital Szczecin.

The village has a population of 893.

== Notable residents ==
- Artur Łącki (born 1961), a Polish politician and businessperson
