= Voivodeship road 107 =

Road in Poland

Voivodeship Road 107
- Droga wojewódzka nr 107

Route information
- Maintained by Zachodnio Pomorski Zarząd Dróg Wojewódzkich
- Length: 24 km (15 mi)

Major junctions
- From: Dziwnówek
- To: Parłówko

Location
- Country: Poland
- Regions: West Pomeranian Voivodeship

Highway system
- National roads in Poland; Voivodeship roads
← DW 106	→ DW 108

Voivodeship road 107 (Polish: Droga wojewódzka nr 107, abbreviated DW 107) is a route in the Polish voivodeship roads network. The route runs through Kamień County (Gmina Dziwnów, Gmina Kamień Pomorski and Gmina Wolin).

== Important settlements along the route ==
- Dziwnówek
- Wrzosowo
- Kamień Pomorski
- Rzewnowo
- Jarzysław
- Rekowo
- Dobropole
- Parłówko

== Route plan ==
km	Icon	Name	Crossed roads
x		Międzyzdroje	—
x		Kołobrzeg	—
0		Dziwnówek	
8		Kamień Pomorski	
13		Rzewnowo	
15		Level crossing for Railway Line 407	
24		Viaduct over the Railway Line 401	
24		Roundabout in Parłówko	—
24		Parłówko	
x		Świnoujście	—
x		Szklarska Poręba	—
