= Voivodeship road 106 =

Road in Poland

Voivodeship Road 106
- Droga wojewódzka nr 106

Route information
- Maintained by Zachodnio Pomorski Zarząd Dróg Wojewódzkich
- Length: 108 km (67 mi)

Major junctions
- From: Rzewnowo
- To: Pyrzyce

Location
- Country: Poland
- Regions: West Pomeranian Voivodeship

Highway system
- National roads in Poland; Voivodeship roads
← DW 105	→ DW 107

Voivodeship Road 106 (Polish: Droga wojewódzka nr 106, abbreviated DW 106) is a route in the Polish voivodeship roads network. The road is 108 km in length and runs through 4 powiats: Kamień County (Gmina Kamień Pomorski and Gmina Golczewo), Goleniów County (Gmina Nowogard and Gmina Maszewo), Stargard County (Gmina Stargard Szczeciński and the city Stargard Szczeciński) and Pyrzyce County (Gmina Warnice and Gmina Pyrzyce).

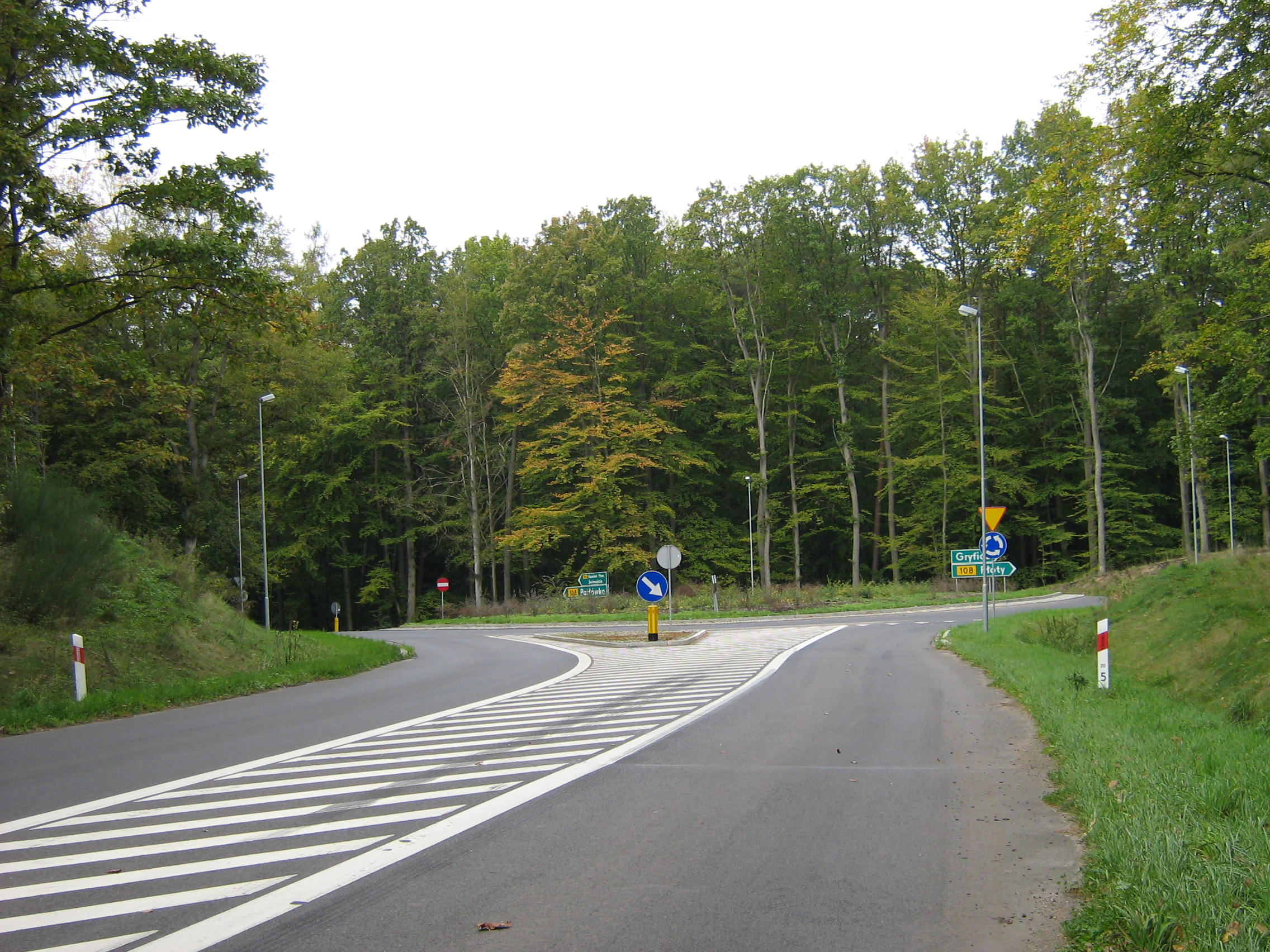
Roundabout near Nowogard

== Important settlements along the route ==
- Rzewnowo
- Golczewo
- Nowogard
- Jenikowo
- Maszewo
- Łęczyca
- Stargard Szczeciński
- Warnice
- Pyrzyce
