= Giżkowo =

- Settlement
- Location within Poland
- Coordinates: 53°53′38″N 14°51′32″E
- Country: Poland
- Voivodeship: West Pomeranian
- County: Kamień
- Gmina: Kamień Pomorski

Giżkowo [ɡiʂˈkɔvɔ] (German: Gieskow) is a settlement in the administrative district of Gmina Kamień Pomorski, within Kamień County, West Pomeranian Voivodeship, in north-western Poland. It lies approximately 10 km (6 mi) south-east of Kamień Pomorski and 56 km (35 mi) north of the regional capital Szczecin.

For the history of the region, see History of Pomerania.
