= Rozwarowo =

- Village
- Location within Poland
- Coordinates: 53°53′44″N 14°43′46″E
- Country: Poland
- Voivodeship: West Pomeranian
- County: Kamień
- Gmina: Kamień Pomorski

Rozwarowo [rɔzvaˈrɔvɔ] (German: Ribbertow) is a village in the administrative district of Gmina Kamień Pomorski, within Kamień County, West Pomeranian Voivodeship, in north-western Poland. It lies approximately 10 km (6 mi) south-west of Kamień Pomorski and 54 km (34 mi) north of the regional capital Szczecin.

For the history of the region, see History of Pomerania.
