= Dziwnówek =

- Village
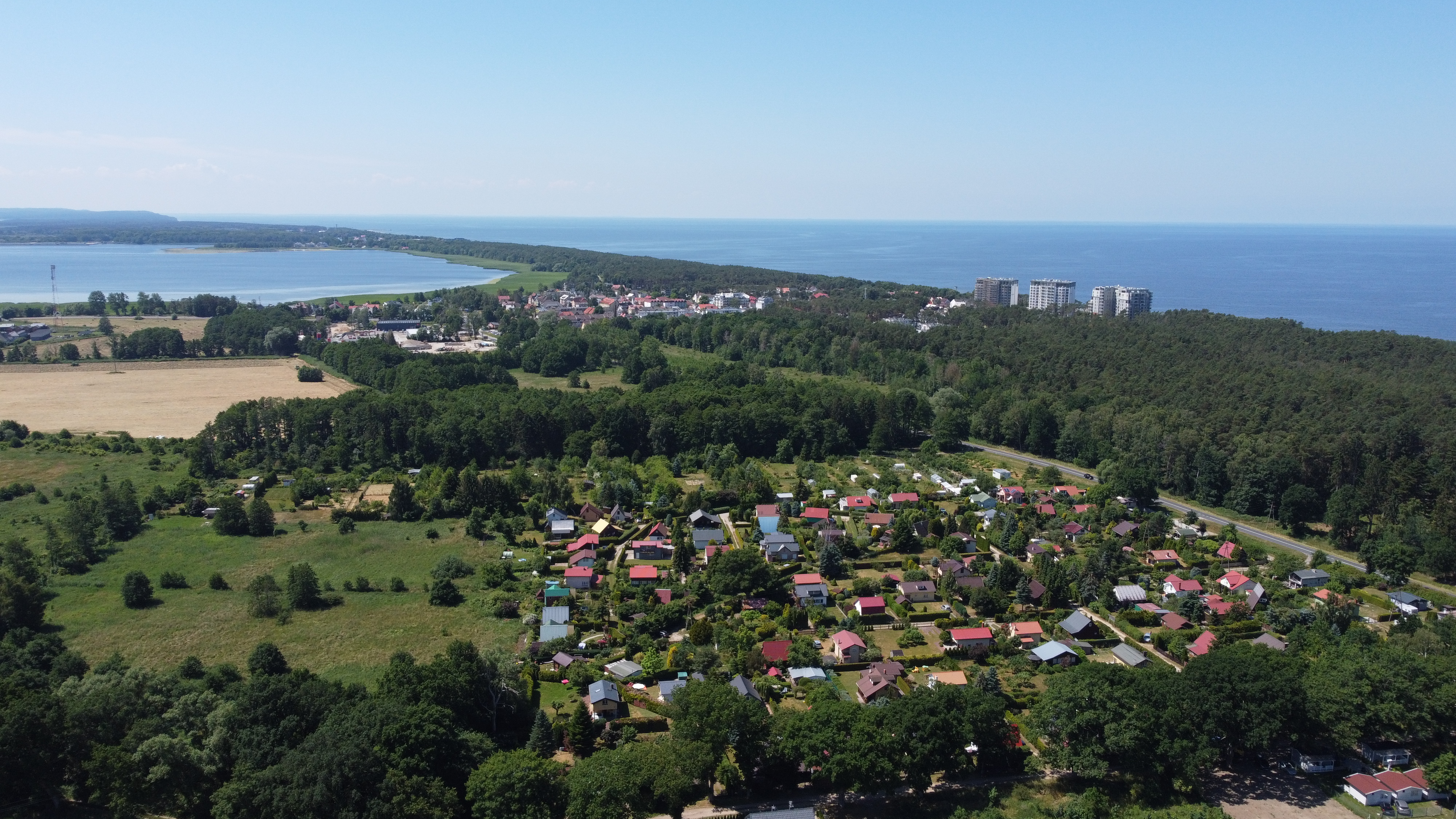
- Aerial view of Dziwnówek

- Location within Poland
- Coordinates: 54°2′N 14°48′E
- Country: Poland
- Voivodeship: West Pomeranian
- County: Kamień
- Gmina: Dziwnów
- Population (2015): 391
- Time zone: UTC+1 (CET)
  - Summer (DST): UTC+2 (CEST)
- Area code: +48 91
- Vehicle registration: ZKA

Dziwnówek [d͡ʑivˈnuvɛk] is a village in the administrative district of Gmina Dziwnów, within Kamień County, West Pomeranian Voivodeship, in north-western Poland. It lies approximately 4 km (2 mi) north-east of Dziwnów, 8 km (5 mi) north of Kamień Pomorski, and 70 km (43 mi) north of the regional capital Szczecin.

According to the data from 2015, the village had 391 inhabitants.

In Dziwnówek, 400 m of the coastline is designated as swimming and bathing area in the summer.

== Location ==
Dziwnówek is situated in the western part of the West Pomeranian Voivodeship coastline, in the north part of the Kamień County. The village finds itself on the forefront of the Dziwnów Spit geological formation, between the Baltic Sea and Wrzosowo bay, which constitutes the northernmost part of Kamień bay. It is a part of Trzebiatów Coast, one of the mesoregions of Szczecin seacoast. Historically, Dziwnówek lies in the north part of Pomerania.

== History ==
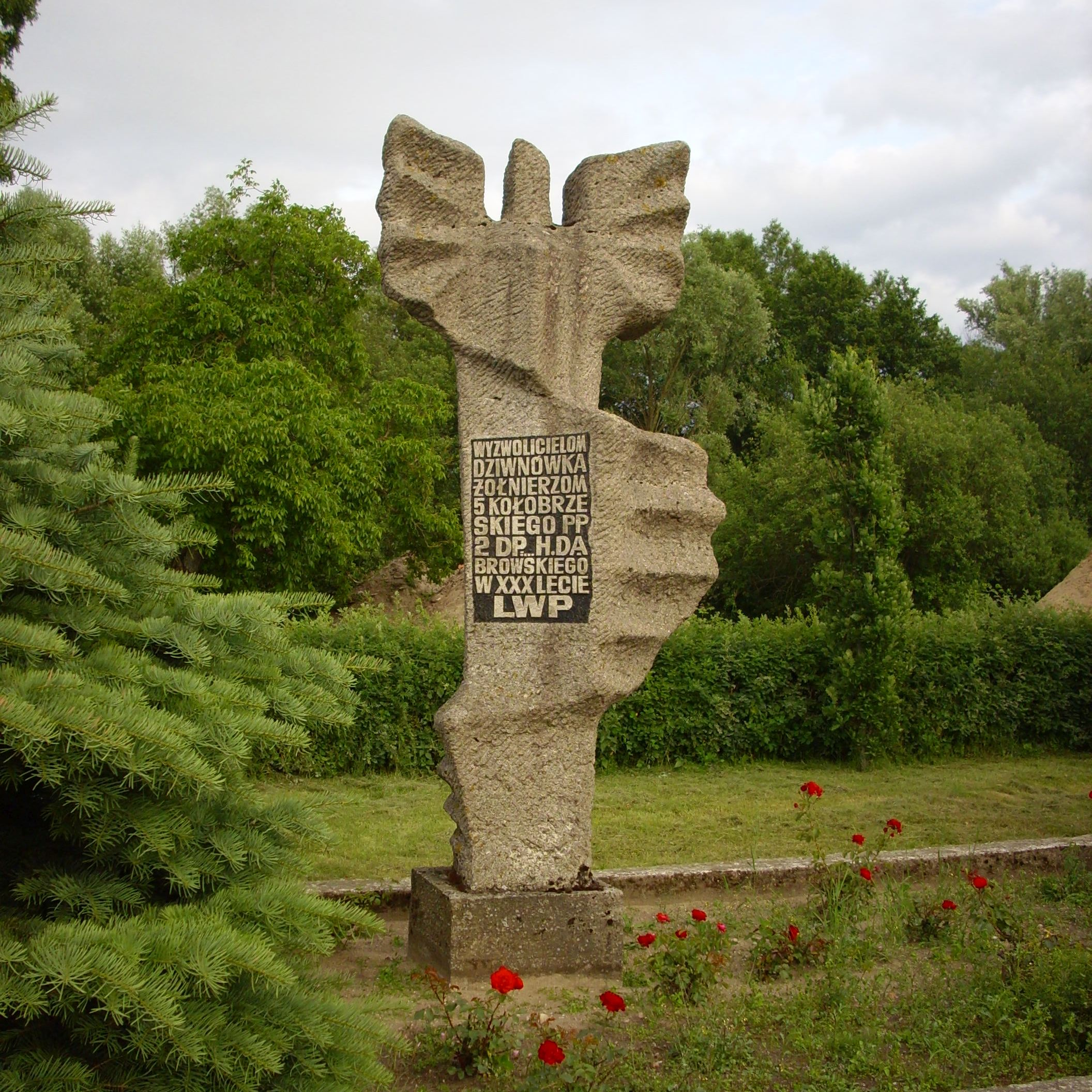
Monument to the 5th Kołobrzeg Infantry Regiment of the Polish Army

The oldest known mention of the village dates back to 1503. It was a small fishing village. From 1871 to 1945 it was part of Germany, known in German as Klein Dievenow. In the final stages of World War II, in March 1945, the battle of Dziwnówek was fought between the Polish and German armies. The then second lieutenant and future head of state Wojciech Jaruzelski commanded a reconnaissance unit in the 5th Infantry Regiment of the 2nd Division of the Polish Army. After the Polish victory the symbolic ceremony of Poland's Wedding to the Sea took place in Dziwnówek on March 15. In 1975 a monument to the soldiers of the 5th Kołobrzeg Infantry Regiment of the 2nd Infantry Division was unveiled in the village.

In 1974–2005 Dziwnówek was recognized by the Polish government as a town with conditions for conducting spa treatment, thanks to which medical facilities could be run here. Based on the properties of natural conditions, the main treatment directions were established for the health care facilities in Dziwnówek: child respiratory and locomotor system diseases.

On 18 July 1982, the foundation act was laid for building a church in the village. The ceremony was led by Bishop Stanisław Stefanek.

From 1975 to 1998 Dziwnówek was located in the Szczecin Voivodeship.

== Infrastructure ==
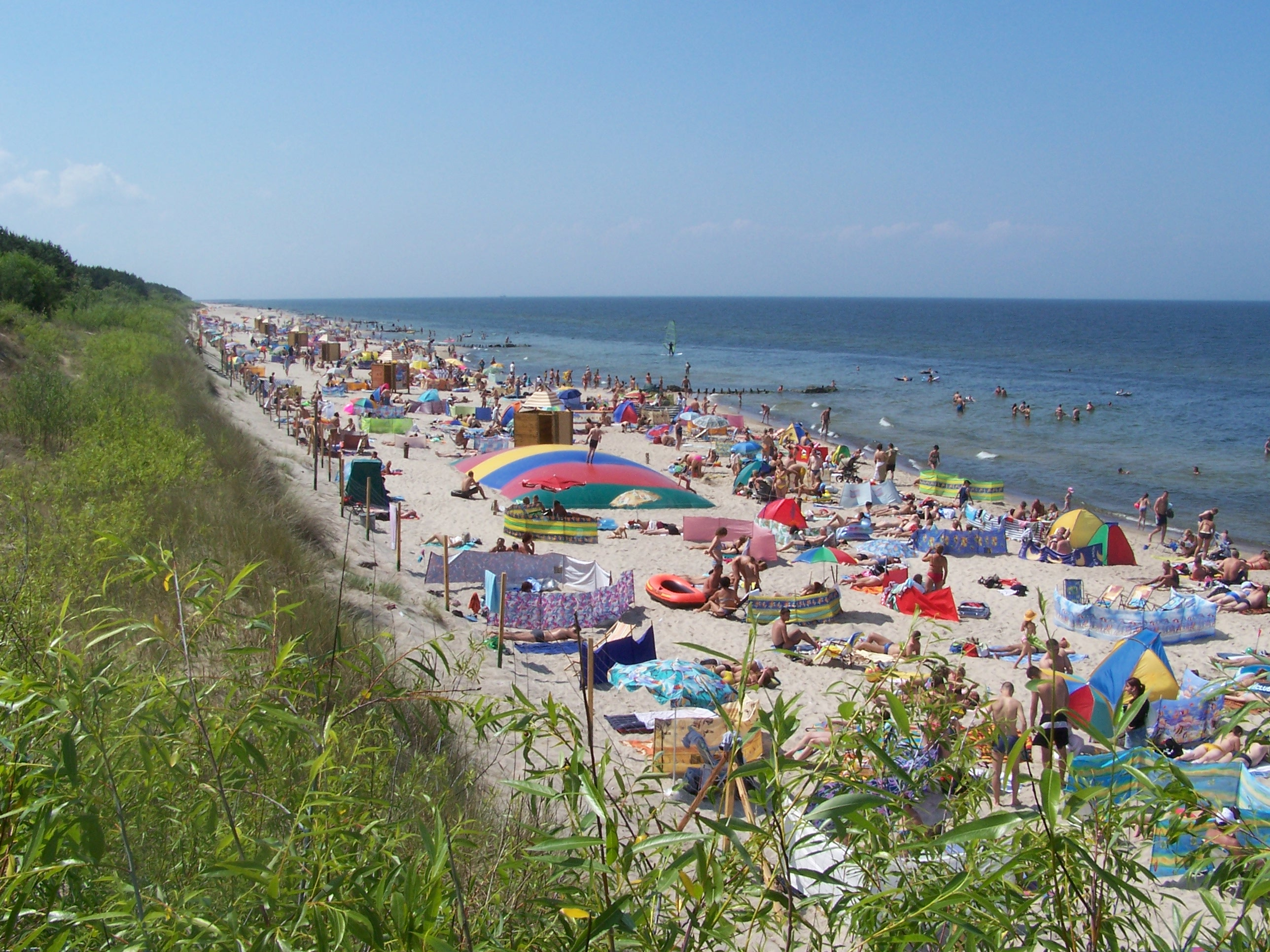
Beach in Dziwnówek

The main tourist destination of the village is the beach.
