= Świniec, West Pomeranian Voivodeship =

Świniec
- Village
- Location within Poland
- Coordinates: 53°59′16″N 14°52′41″E
- Country: Poland
- Voivodeship: West Pomeranian
- County: Kamień
- Gmina: Kamień Pomorski
- Population: 110

Świniec [ˈɕfiɲɛt͡s] (German: Schwenz) is a village in the administrative district of Gmina Kamień Pomorski, within Kamień County, West Pomeranian Voivodeship, in north-western Poland. It lies approximately 7 km (4 mi) east of Kamień Pomorski and 67 km (42 mi) north of the regional capital Szczecin. The village has a population of 110.

== See also ==
- History of Pomerania
