= Chrząstowo, West Pomeranian Voivodeship =

Chrząstowo
- Village
- Location within Poland
- Coordinates: 53°59′33″N 14°50′38″E
- Country: Poland
- Voivodeship: West Pomeranian
- County: Kamień
- Gmina: Kamień Pomorski

Chrząstowo [xʂɔ̃sˈtɔvɔ] (German: Granzow) is a village in the administrative district of Gmina Kamień Pomorski, within Kamień County, West Pomeranian Voivodeship, in north-western Poland. It lies approximately 5 km (3 mi) north-east of Kamień Pomorski and 67 km (42 mi) north of the regional capital Szczecin.

== See also ==
- History of Pomerania
