= Śniatowo =

- Settlement
- Location within Poland
- Coordinates: 53°53′5″N 14°52′21″E
- Country: Poland
- Voivodeship: West Pomeranian
- County: Kamień
- Gmina: Kamień Pomorski

Śniatowo [ɕɲaˈtɔvɔ] (German: Schnatow) is a settlement in the administrative district of Gmina Kamień Pomorski, within Kamień County, West Pomeranian Voivodeship, in north-western Poland. It lies approximately 12 km (7 mi) south-east of Kamień Pomorski and 56 km (35 mi) north of the regional capital Szczecin.
