= Bloedorn =

Bloedorn is a German surname. Notable people with the surname include:

- Chuck Bloedorn (1912–1998), American basketball player
- Erich Bloedorn (1902–1975), German Luftwaffe pilot
- Greg Bloedorn (born 1972), American football player
- Willi Bloedorn (1887–1946), German Nazi politician
