= Miłachowo, West Pomeranian Voivodeship =

Miłachowo
- Village
- Location within Poland
- Coordinates: 53°56′22″N 14°46′29″E
- Country: Poland
- Voivodeship: West Pomeranian
- County: Kamień
- Gmina: Kamień Pomorski

Miłachowo [miwaˈxɔvɔ] (German: Milchow) is a village in the administrative district of Gmina Kamień Pomorski, within Kamień County, West Pomeranian Voivodeship, in north-western Poland. It lies approximately 4 km (2 mi) south of Kamień Pomorski and 60 km (37 mi) north of the regional capital Szczecin.

For the history of the region, see History of Pomerania.
