= Benice, West Pomeranian Voivodeship =

Benice
- Village
- Location within Poland
- Coordinates: 53°53′45″N 14°54′40″E
- Country: Poland
- Voivodeship: West Pomeranian
- County: Kamień
- Gmina: Kamień Pomorski

Benice [bɛˈnit͡sɛ] (German: Benz) is a village in the administrative district of Gmina Kamień Pomorski, within Kamień County, West Pomeranian Voivodeship, in north-western Poland. It lies approximately 12 km (7 mi) south-east of Kamień Pomorski and 58 km (36 mi) north of the regional capital Szczecin.

For the history of the region, see History of Pomerania.
