= Sibin, Poland =

Sibin
- Village
- Location within Poland
- Coordinates: 53°54′19.22″N 14°40′33.74″E
- Country: Poland
- Voivodeship: West Pomeranian
- County: Kamień
- Gmina: Kamień Pomorski

Sibin [ˈɕibin] (German: Zebbin) is a village in the administrative district of Gmina Kamień Pomorski, within Kamień County, West Pomeranian Voivodeship, in north-western Poland. It lies approximately 11 km (7 mi) south-west of Kamień Pomorski and 54 km (34 mi) north of the regional capital Szczecin.
