= Jarszewo =

- Village
- Location within Poland
- Coordinates: 53°55′42″N 14°47′17″E
- Country: Poland
- Voivodeship: West Pomeranian
- County: Kamień
- Gmina: Kamień Pomorski

Jarszewo [jarˈʂɛvɔ] (German: Jassow) is a village in the administrative district of Gmina Kamień Pomorski, within Kamień County, West Pomeranian Voivodeship, in north-western Poland. It lies approximately 5 km (3 mi) south of Kamień Pomorski and 59 km (37 mi) north of the regional capital Szczecin.

For the history of the region, see History of Pomerania.
