= Buszęcin =

- Village
- Location within Poland
- Coordinates: 53°54′12″N 14°46′18″E
- Country: Poland
- Voivodeship: West Pomeranian
- County: Kamień
- Gmina: Kamień Pomorski

Buszęcin [buˈʂɛnt͡ɕin] German: Büssenthin) is a village in the administrative district of Gmina Kamień Pomorski, within Kamień County, West Pomeranian Voivodeship, in north-western Poland. It lies approximately 8 km (5 mi) south of Kamień Pomorski and 56 km (35 mi) north of the regional capital Szczecin.
