= Radawka, West Pomeranian Voivodeship =

Radawka
- Village
- Location within Poland
- Coordinates: 54°2′N 14°50′E
- Country: Poland
- Voivodeship: West Pomeranian
- County: Kamień
- Gmina: Kamień Pomorski
- Population: 0

Radawka [raˈdafka] (German: Raddack) is a village in the administrative district of Gmina Kamień Pomorski, within Kamień County, West Pomeranian Voivodeship, in north-western Poland. It lies approximately 8 km (5 mi) north-east of Kamień Pomorski and 71 km (44 mi) north of the regional capital Szczecin.

For the history of the region, see History of Pomerania.
