= Borucin, West Pomeranian Voivodeship =

Borucin
- Village
- Location within Poland
- Coordinates: 53°57′49″N 14°49′47″E
- Country: Poland
- Voivodeship: West Pomeranian
- County: Kamień
- Gmina: Kamień Pomorski

Borucin [bɔˈrut͡ɕin] (German: Marquardsmühl) is a village in the administrative district of Gmina Kamień Pomorski, within Kamień County, West Pomeranian Voivodeship, in north-western Poland. It lies approximately 3 km (2 mi) east of Kamień Pomorski and 63 km (39 mi) north of the regional capital Szczecin.

== See also ==
History of Pomerania
