= Rarwino, Kamień County =

Rarwino
- Village
- Location within Poland
- Coordinates: 53°55′N 14°50′E
- Country: Poland
- Voivodeship: West Pomeranian
- County: Kamień
- Gmina: Kamień Pomorski
- Time zone: UTC+1 (CET)
  - Summer (DST): UTC+2 (CEST)
- Vehicle registration: ZKA

Rarwino [rarˈvinɔ] (German: Rarwien) is a village in the administrative district of Gmina Kamień Pomorski, within Kamień County, West Pomeranian Voivodeship, in north-western Poland. It lies approximately 7 km (4 mi) south-east of Kamień Pomorski and 58 km (36 mi) north of the regional capital Szczecin.

During World War II, in February 1945, a German-perpetrated death march of Allied prisoners-of-war from the Stalag XX-B POW camp passed through the village.
