= Rzewnówko =

- Hamlet (colony)
- Location within Poland
- Coordinates: 53°56′41″N 14°48′09″E
- Country: Poland
- Voivodeship: West Pomeranian
- County: Kamień
- Municipality: Kamień Pomorski
- Time zone: UTC+1 (CET)
  - Summer (DST): UTC+2 (CEST)
- Postal code: 72-400
- Area code: +48 91
- Car plates: ZKA

Rzewnówko (Polish: [ʐɛvˈnuf.kɔ]) is a hamlet (colony) in the West Pomeranian Voivodeship, Poland, located within the municipality of Kamień Pomorski in Kamień County.
