= Górki, Kamień County =

Górki
- Village
- Location within Poland
- Coordinates: 53°54′1″N 14°49′36″E
- Country: Poland
- Voivodeship: West Pomeranian
- County: Kamień
- Gmina: Kamień Pomorski
- Population: 210

Górki [ˈɡurki] (meaning "hills") (German: Görke) is a village in the administrative district of Gmina Kamień Pomorski, within Kamień County, West Pomeranian Voivodeship, in north-western Poland. It lies approximately 9 km (6 mi) south of Kamień Pomorski and 57 km (35 mi) north of the regional capital Szczecin.

For the history of the region, see History of Pomerania.

The village has a population of 210.
