= Ganiec =

- Village
- Location within Poland
- Coordinates: 53°53′26″N 14°52′18″E
- Country: Poland
- Voivodeship: West Pomeranian
- County: Kamień
- Gmina: Kamień Pomorski
- Population: 10

Ganiec [ˈɡaɲɛt͡s] (German: Gahnz) is a village in the administrative district of Gmina Kamień Pomorski, within Kamień County, West Pomeranian Voivodeship, in north-western Poland. It lies approximately 11 km (7 mi) south-east of Kamień Pomorski and 56 km (35 mi) north of the regional capital Szczecin.

For the history of the region, see History of Pomerania.

The village has a population of 10.
