= Strzeżewo, Kamień County =

Strzeżewo
- Village
- Location within Poland
- Coordinates: 54°0′46″N 14°52′3″E
- Country: Poland
- Voivodeship: West Pomeranian
- County: Kamień
- Gmina: Kamień Pomorski

Strzeżewo [stʂɛˈʐɛvɔ] (German: Stresow) is a village in the administrative district of Gmina Kamień Pomorski, within Kamień County, West Pomeranian Voivodeship, in north-western Poland. It lies approximately 8 km (5 mi) north-east of Kamień Pomorski and 69 km (43 mi) north of the regional capital Szczecin.

For the history of the region, see History of Pomerania.
