= Stawno, Kamień County =

Stawno
- Village
- Location within Poland
- Coordinates: 53°52′6″N 14°49′28″E
- Country: Poland
- Voivodeship: West Pomeranian
- County: Kamień
- Gmina: Kamień Pomorski
- Population (approx.): 145
- Website: http://www.stawno.weebly.com

Stawno [ˈstavnɔ] (German: Stäwen) is a village in the administrative district of Gmina Kamień Pomorski, within Kamień County, West Pomeranian Voivodeship, in north-western Poland. It lies approximately 12 km (7 mi) south of Kamień Pomorski and 53 km (33 mi) north of the regional capital Szczecin.

For the history of the region, see History of Pomerania.

The village has an approximate population of 145.
