= Names of European cities in different languages (E–H) =

Different names for European cities in neighbouring languages

The names used for some major European cities differ in different European and sometimes non-European languages. In some countries where there are two or more languages spoken, such as Belgium or Switzerland, dual forms may be used within the city itself, for example on signage. This is also the case in Ireland, despite a low level of actual usage of the Irish language. In other cases where a regional language is officially recognised, that form of the name may be used in the region, but not nationally. Examples include the Welsh language in Wales in the United Kingdom, and parts of Italy and Spain.

There is a slow trend to return to the local name, which has been going on for a long time. In English Livorno is now used, the old English form of Leghorn having become antiquated at least a century ago. In some cases, such as the replacement of Danzig with Gdańsk, the official name has been changed more recently. Since 1995, the government of Ukraine has encouraged the use of Kyiv rather than Kiev.

== E ==
English name	Other names or former names
(Netherlands) Echt	Ech (Limburgish*), Echt (Dutch*), Echtas (Lithuanian)
(United Kingdom) (Scotland) Edinburgh	Àidīngbǎo – 愛丁堡 (traditional characters) / 爱丁堡 (simplified characters) (Mandarin Chinese*), Ài-teng-pó – 愛丁堡 (Hokkien/Taiwanese), Caeredin (Welsh*),^{[KNAB]} Dinedin* / Din Edin^{[KNAB]} (Breton), Doon Edin (Manx*), Dún Éideann (Irish*), Dùn Èideann (Scottish Gaelic*), Edeunbeoreo / Edŭnbŏrŏ – 에든버러 (Korean), Edimborg (Occitan*), Édimbourg (French*),^{[KNAB]} Êdîmbourg (Jersey Norman), Edimburg (Catalan*,^{[KNAB]} alternative Serbian*), Edimburgo (Italian*,^{[KNAB]} Portuguese*,^{[KNAB]} Spanish*,^{[KNAB]} Tagalog*), Edimburgum (alternative Latin), Edimvoúrgo – Εδιμβούργο (Greek*), Eḍinabrā – এডিনবরা (Bengali*), `Ēdinbara – เอดินบะระ [ʔeː din bàʔ ráʔ] (Thai)*, Eḍinbarā - एडिनबरा (Hindi*),^{[KNAB]} Eḍin‌barā – ఎడిన్‌బరా (Telugu), Ēḍinbarā – ਐਡਿਨਬਰਾ (Punjabi*), Edinboarch (alternative West Frisian*), Edinborg (Faroese, Icelandic*^{[KNAB]}), Edinbro – אדינברו (Hebrew*), Edinburc (Friulian*), Edinburch (West Frisian*), Edinburg (Afrikaans*, Albanian*, German [rare])*, Slovenian*), Edinburg – Единбург (Bulgarian*, Macedonian*, Serbian*), Edinburg – Едінбурґ (alternative Ukrainian*), Edinburg – עדינבורג (Yiddish*), Èdinburg – Эдинбург (Russian*),^{[KNAB]} Edinburga (Latvian*), Edinburgas (Lithuanian*), Edinburgi – ედინბურგი (Georgian*),^{[KNAB]} Edinburgum (Latin*), Edinburk (Czech*), Edynburg (Polish*),^{[KNAB]} Edynburh – Единбург (Ukrainian*), Edynburh – Эдынбург (Belarusian*), Ejimbara – エジンバラ (Japanese*), Embra, Embro* (Scots), Eṭiṉparō – எடின்பரோ (Tamil*), ʾIdinburah – إدنبرة (Arabic*), Karedin (Cornish*), Ngoidìngbóu – 愛丁堡 (Cantonese)*, Oi-tên-páu – 愛丁堡 (Hakka*)
(Turkey) Edirne	Aderne – اَدِرنه (Persian*), Adirna – أَدِرْنَة (Arabic*), Ädirnä – Әдирнә (Bashkir*, Kazan Tatar*), Adrianopel (former German*), Adrianopla (Portuguese*), Adrianople (former English*), Adrianopojë* (Albanian), Adrianopol (Polish*, Romanian*, Slovak*), Adrianopol' – Адрианополь (former Russian*), Adrianopole (Romanian*), Adrianopoli – ადრიანოპოლი (former Georgian*), Adrianopoli (former Italian*, Finnish*), Adrianopolis – Ադրիանապոլիս (Armenian*, Czech*, Dutch*, Finnish*), Adrianópolis (Spanish*), Adríanópólis (former Icelandic), Andrinople (former French),^{[KNAB]} Adrianoúpoli – Αδριανούπολη (Greek*), Āidíěrnèi – 埃迪爾內 (traditional characters) / 埃迪尔内 (simplified characters) (Mandarin Chinese*), Drinápoly (alternative/former Hungarian*), Drinopol (alternative Czech*, alternative Slovak*), Drinopolj – Дринопољ (former Serbian), Drinopolje (former Croatian), Edirnä (Gagauz*), Edirne (Crimean Tatar*, Kurdish*, Turkish*), Edirne – ედირნე (Georgian*), Èdirne – Эдирне (Russian*), Ədirnə (Azeri*), Edrene - Едрене (alternative Macedonian*), Εdrenë* (alternative Albanian), Hādéliángbōlìsī - 哈德良波利斯 (former Mandarin Chinese), Hadrianople (former variant in English*), Hadrianopolis (Latin*), Jedrene – Једрене (Serbian*), Odrin – Одрин (Bulgarian*, Macedonian*), Odrina (former Romanian), Odrysa (Thracian), Orestiás – Ὀρεστιάς (Ancient Greek*), Uskudama (Thracian)
(Belgium) Eeklo	Eeklo (Dutch*), Êeklo (West Flemish*), Ėklas (Lithuanian)
(Netherlands) Eemnes	Eemnes (Dutch*), Emnesas (Lithuanian)
(Hungary) Eger	Agria (Latin*), Eger (Hungarian*,^{[KNAB]} Dutch*, Finnish*), Eger – Еґер (alternative Ukrainian*), Eğri (Turkish*), Eher – Егер (Ukrainian*), Erlau (German*),^{[KNAB]} Jager (archaic Czech*),^{[KNAB]} Jager – Ягеръ (archaic Russian),^{[KNAB]} Jáger (Slovak*),^{[KNAB]} Jagier (archaic Polish), Jegar (archaic Croatian), Jegra (archaic Croatian), Jegra – Јегра (Serbian*)
(Netherlands) Eindhoven	Ajntovën (Albanian*), Endehoftūn (Anglo-Saxon*), Endhovia (alternative Latin), Eindhoown (Low Saxon*), Eindhove (Limburgish*), Eindhoven (Dutch*), Eindhovena (Latvian*), Eindhovenas (Lithuanian*), Eindovia (Latin*), Ejndhoave (Colognian*), Eyndhoven (Azerbaijani*), Eyndxoven (Uzbek*)
(Germany) Eisenhüttenstadt	Eisenhüttenstadt (German*), Stalinstadt (former German*)
(Austria) Eisenstadt	Ajzenštat – Ајзенштат (Serbian*), Castrum Ferrum (alternative Latin), Eisenstadt (German*),^{[KNAB]} Eisnstod (Austro-Bavarian German*), Ferreum Castrum (Latin*), Kismarton (Hungarian*),^{[KNAB]} Železno (Slovak, Slovene*), Željezno (Croatian*),^{[KNAB]} Željezno – Жељезно (alternative Serbian) (NB: the city's subdivisions also have different names in different languages)
(Poland) Elbląg	Elbing (German*), El'bing – Эльбинг (former Russian), Elbiąg (local Polish dialect), Elbląg (Polish)*, El'blong – Эльблонг (Russian*), Ilfing (Old Danish*), Truso (Old Prussian)
(Netherlands) Elburg	Elburch (Western Frisian*), Elburg (Dutch*), Elburgas (Lithuanian)
(Russia) Elista	Elista – Элиста (Russian), Elista – Еліста (Ukrainian), Elst – Элст (Kalmyk, Mongolian), Stepnoy (former name*)
(Poland) Ełk	Ełk (Polish*), Lyck (German*), Éwūkè - 俄乌克/俄烏克 (Mandarin), Lukas (Lithuanian)
(Denmark) Elsinore	Elseneur (French*), Elsenor (Portuguese*), Elsinor (Spanish*, Romanian*), Elsinore (Italian*), Helsingør (Danish*, German variant*, Norwegian*), Helsingör (Finnish*, German*, Swedish*)
(Netherlands) Emmeloord	Civitas Fortunae Emmeloordis (Latin), Emelordas (Lithuanian), Emmeloard (Western Frisian*), Emmeloord (Dutch*)
(Germany) Emmerich	Emmerich (German*), Emmerik (Dutch*)
(Belgium) Enghien	Angia (Latin), Edinge (Limburgish*), Edingen (Dutch*), Enge (West Flemish), Enghien (French*), Ingî (Picard), Inguî (Walloon*)
(Netherlands) Enkhuizen	Encusa (Spanish*), Enkhuizen (Dutch*), Enkheizenas (Lithuanian*) Enkhuyzn (West Flemish*), Inkhuzen (Saterland Frisian*, Western Frisian*)
(Netherlands) Enschede	Eanske (Low German*, Low Saxon*), Enscheda (Latin*), Enschede (Dutch*), Enschedė (Lithuanian*), Enshede (Latvian*), Ensxede (Azerbaijani*), Ynskedee (Western Frisian*)
(Germany) Erfurt	Erfurt (German*), Ερφούρτη (Greek*), Erfordia (Latin*), Jarobrod (Upper Sorbian*)
(Germany) Erlangen	Erlangen (Dutch*, French*, German*), Erlanky (Czech, old, obsolete*)
(Finland) Espoo	Aīsībō – 埃斯波 (Chinese*), Esbo (Swedish*), Espo (Latvian*, Lithuanian*), Espoo (Estonian*, Finnish*, French*, German*, Portuguese*, Spanish*), Espoo – Эспоо (Russian*), Esupō – エスポー (Japanese*)
(Germany) Essen	Assindia (Latin), Esse (Limburgish*), Essen (English, German), Essjen - Э́ссен (Russian)
(Hungary) Esztergom	Eštergon or Ostrogon – Oстргон (Serbian*), Estergom – Эстергом (Russian*), Estergon (Turkish*), Esztergom (Hungarian*), Gran (German*), Ostřihom (Czech*), Ostrihom (Slovak*), Ostrogon or Ostrigon (Croatian*), Ostrzyhom (Polish*), Solva* or Strigonium * (Latin), Strigonio (ancient Italian*), Strigoniu (Romanian*)
(Belgium) Eupen	Eupen (Dutch*, French*, German*), Naowe* or Naouwe* (Walloon, medieval spellings), Néau (French*, archaïc), Neyow (Walloon*)
(United Kingdom) (England) Exeter	Caerwysg (Welsh*), Escanceaster (Old English), Exchestre (Middle English), Exonia (Latin*), Isca (Dumnoniorum) (Imperial Latin), Karesk (Cornish*)

== F ==
English name	Other names or former names
(Cyprus) / (Northern Cyprus) Famagusta	Ammóchostos – Αμμόχωστος (Greek*), Famagosta (Italian*), Famagouste (French*), Famagusta (Dutch*, English*, German*), Gazimağusa (Turkish*)
(Austria) Feldkirch	Feldkirch (German*), San Peder (Romansh), Tǔsì - 土寺 (Mandarin)
(Ukraine) / (Autonomous Republic of Crimea) Feodosia	Cafà (archaic Ligurian), Caffa (archaic English), Kafa – Кафа (archaic Ukrainian), Käfä – Кәфә (Kazan Tatar), Káffas – Κάφφας (medieval Greek), Kefe (Crimean Tatar, Turkish), Feodosija (Finnish), Feodosija – Феодосия (Russian), Feodosija – Феодосія (Ukrainian), Feodossija (German), Tʿeodosia – Թեոդոսիա (Armenian), Teodozja (Polish), Theodhosía – Θεοδωσία (Greek), Theodosia (Latin), Théodosie (French), Xí'àoduōxíyà - 席奥多席亚/席奧多席亞 (Mandarin)
(Italy) Fiesole	Faesulae (Latin), Fiesole (Italian), Vipsul (Etruscan)
(Slovakia) Fiľakovo	Fiľakovo (Slovak*), Fiļakovo (Latvian*), Filek (Turkish*), Filiakovas (Lithuanian*), Filjakovo (Serbo-Croatian*), Filjakovo – Фиљаково (Serbian*), Fülek (Hungarian*), Fülleck (German*)
(Germany) Flensburg	Flensborag (North Frisian* (Öömrang)), Flansborj (North Frisian (Mooring)), Flensborg (Danish*, Low German*), Flensbourg (French*), Flensburch (West Frisian*), Flensburg (German*, Romanian*), Flensburgo (Portuguese*), Flensbörg (Gronings, Swedish*)
(Belgium) Fleurus	Flerius (Latin), Fleriusas (Lithuanian), Fleuru (Walloon*), Fleurus (French*)
(Switzerland) Flims	Flem (Romansh*), Flims (German*)
(Italy) Florence	Fflorens (Welsh*), Firenca (Bosnian*, Croatian*), Firenca – Фиренца (Serbian*), Firence (Slovene*), Firentse – フィレンツェ (Japanese*), Firenze (Estonian*, Finnish*, Hungarian*, Italian*, Maltese, Norwegian*), Floireans (Scottish Gaelic), Florance (Walloon*), Flórans (Irish*), Floransa (Turkish*), Florença (Portuguese*), Florence (Afrikaans*, Dutch*, French*, Latvian*), Florència (Catalan*), Florencia (Slovak*, Spanish*), Florencie (Czech*), Florencija (Lithuanian*), Florencja (Polish*), Florens (former Danish*, Swedish*), Florenţa (Romanian*), Florentía – Φλωρεντία (Greek*), Florentia (Latin), Florentië (older Dutch*), Florentsiya – Флоренция (Russian*), Florentsiya – Флоренція (Ukrainian*), Florenz (German*), Fóluólúnsi – 佛羅倫斯 / 翡冷翠 (Chinese), Pirenche / P'irench'e – 피렌체 (Korean), Plorentsia – ფლორენცია (Georgian*)
(Belgium) Florenville	Floravile (Walloon*), Florenville (French*)
(Netherlands) Flushing	Flesinga (Spanish*), Flessinga (Italian*, Venetian*), Flessingue (French*), Flissingam (Latin), Flissingen (West Frisian*), Flushing (English, Waray*), Vlisingeni (Albanian*), Vlisingenas (Lithuanian), Vlissienge (Zeelandic), Vlissingen (Dutch*), Vlissiengn (West Flemish*)
(United Kingdom) (Scotland) Fort Augustus	Cille Chuimein (Irish*, Scots Gaelic*), Fort Augustus (Dutch*, English*, French*, German*), Forte Augusto (Italian*), Kiliwhimin (former English, former Scots), Àogǔsīdūbǎo - 奥古斯都堡 (Mandarin)
(Belgium) Fontaine-l'Évêque	Fontaine-l'Évêque (French*), Fontana Episcopi (Latin), Fontinne-l'-Eveke (Walloon*)
(Belgium) Fosses-la-Ville	Fosse-la-Ville (Picard*), Fosse-li-Veye (Walloon*), Fosses-la-Ville (French*)
(Netherlands) Franeker	Franeker (Dutch*), Franekeris (Lithuanian), Frjentsjer (Northern Frisian*, Western Frisian*, Saterland Frisian*)
(Germany) Frankfurt am Main	Fǎlánkèfú – 法蘭克福 (Mandarin Chinese*), Francfort (Catalan*), Fráncfort del Meno (Spanish*), Francfort-sur-le-Main (French*), Francfôrt-sus-lo-Men (Arpitan*), Francfurt (Romansh*), Francoforte sobre o Meno (Portuguese*), Francoforte sul Meno (Italian*), Frankfort aan de Main (Dutch*, Limburgian*), Frankfoúrti – Φρανκφούρτη or Frankfoúrti epí tou Máin – Φρανκφούρτη επί του Μάιν (Greek)*, Frankfurt al Mayn – פרנקפורט על מיין (Hebrew*), Frankfurt am Main (German*), Frankfurt Maini ääres (Estonian*), Frankfurt nad Menem (Polish*), Frankfurt nad Mohanem (Czech*), Frankfurt nad Mohanom (Slovak*), Frankfurt na Majni (Bosnian*, Croatian*, Slovene*), Frankfurt na Majni – Франкфурт на Мајни (Serbian*) Frankfurt-na-Mayne – Франкфурт-на-Майне (Russian*), Frankfurt-na-Mayni – Франкфурт-на-Майні (Ukrainian*), Frankfurt pe Main (Romanian*), Frankfurtas prie Maino (Lithuanian*), Frankfurte pie Mainas (Latvian*), Furankufuruto – フランクフルト (Japanese*), (Main Kıyısındaki) Frankfurt (Turkish*), Mainis prank'purt'i – მაინის ფრანკფურტი (Georgian*), Majnafrankfurt (former Hungarian*), Maynada Frankfurt (Azeri*), Peurangkeupureuteu / P'ŭrangk'ŭp'urŭt'ŭ – 프랑크푸르트 (Korean)
(Germany) Frankfurt (Oder)	Fráncfort del Oder (Spanish*), Francfort-sur-l'Oder (French*), Francoforte sobre o Óder (Portuguese*), Francoforte sull'Oder (Italian*), Frankfurt (Oder)* or Frankfurt an der Oder (German), Frankfurt nad Odrą / Słubice (historic) (Polish*), Frankfurt nad Odrou (Czech*, Slovak*), Frankfurt-na-Odere – Франкфурт-на-Одере (Russian*), Frankfurt na Odri (Bosnian*, Croatian*, Serbian*, Slovene*), Frankfurt Oderi ääres (Estonian*)Frankfurt pe Oder (Romanian*), Frankfurtas prie Oderio (Lithuanian*), Frankfurte pie Oderas (Latvian*), (Oder Kıyısındaki) Frankfurt (Turkish*), Oderafrankfurt (older Hungarian*), (Oderdə) Frankfurt (Azeri*), Frankfoúrti (Óder) – Φρανκφούρτη (Όντερ) or Frankfoúrti epí tou Óder – Φρανκφούρτη επί του Όντερ (Greek)*
(Germany) Freiburg	Frajburg – Фрајбург (Serbian*), Freiburg im Breisgau (German*), Freiburga (Latvian*), Fribôrg-en-Brisgovia (Arpitan*), Fribourg or Fribourg-en-Brisgau (French*), Friburgo (Portuguese*), Friburgo de Brisgovia (Spanish*), Friburgo in Brisgovia (Italian*), Fryburg Bryzgowijski (Polish*), Furaiburuku – フライブルク (Japanese*), Praiburgi – ფრაიბურგი (Georgian*)
(Germany) Freising	Brižinje* or Brižine* (Slovene), Freising (German*), Fresinga (Spanish variant*), Frisinga (Italian*, Spanish*), Frisingue (French*), Fryzynga (Polish*)
(Switzerland) Fribourg	Freiburg im Üechtland (German*), Fribôrg (Arpitan*), Friborgo (Swiss Italian*), Fribourg (Finnish*, French*), Friburg (Catalan*, Romansh*), Friburgo (Italian *, Portuguese*, Spanish*), Fryburg (Polish*)
(Poland) Frombork	Frauenburg (German*), Frombork (Polish*)

== G ==
English name	Other names or former names
(Slovakia) Gabčíkovo	Beš (archaic Slovak), Bős (Hungarian*), Gabčíkovo (Slovak*), Gabčīkovo (Latvian*)
(Slovakia) Galanta	Galanta (Slovak*), Galanta – Галанта (Serbian*), Galánta (Hungarian*), Gallandau (German*), Qаlаntа (Azerbaijani*)
(Republic of Ireland) Galway	Gaillimh (Irish)*, Galvia (Latin)*, Golwei / Kolwei - 골웨이 (Korean), a' Ghailbhinn (Scots Gaelic)*
(Sweden) Gällivare	Gällivare (Swedish)*, Jällivaara (Finnish)*, Jelivarė (Lithuanian)*, Jiellevárre (Lule Sami), Jiellevárri (Northern Sami)*, Váhčir (Northern Sami alternate)*, Váhtjer (Lule Sami alternate), Yellivare – Елливаре (Russian)*
(Sweden) Gävle	Gefle (Norwegian, Swedish before 1940), Gevalia (Latin)
(Slovakia) Gbely	Egbell (German*, Hungarian*), Gbeli (Latvian*), Gbely (Slovak*), Gbely – Гбели (Serbian*)
(Poland) Gdańsk	Dancig, Dancka (older Hungarian*), Danswijk (former Dutch)*, Danţig (older Romanian*), Dantiscum (Latin alternate)*, Dants - דאַנץ (Yiddish)*, Dantsic (older English alternate)*, Dantzig or Gdansk (Afrikaans)*, Danzica (Italian)*, Danzig (Icelandic)*, Danzig (German*, Spanish, older Turkish*), Danzigue (Portuguese)*, Gdaňsk (Czech)*, Gdansk (Finnish*, Romanian*, Slovene*, Turkish*), Gdansk - גדנסק (Hebrew)*, Gdańsk (Danish*, Dutch*, Polish*), Gdan'sk - Гданьск (Russian)*, Gdanjsk (Bosnian*, Croatian*, Serbian*), Gdaņska (Latvian)*, Gdanskas (Lithuanian)*, Gdansk'i – გდანსკი (Georgian*), Gdanjsk - Гдањск (Serbian*, Macedonian*), Gduńsk (Kashubian)*, Gedania (Latin alternate)*, Gedanum (Latin)*, Geudanseukeu / Kŭdansŭk'ŭ - 그단스크 (Korean), Ghdhansk - Γδανσκ (Greek)*, Gudanisuku - グダニスク (Japanese)*, Gydanysg (Welsh)*, Gyddanyzc (Pomeranian, mentioned in 997 AD), Hdans'k - Гданськ (Ukrainian)*
(Poland) Gdynia	Gdiņa (Latvian)*, Gdingen (former Dutch*, German*), Gdiniô (Kashubian*, Pomeranian), Gdyně (Czech)*, Gdynė (Lithuanian)*, Gdynia (Finnish*, Polish*, Romanian*), Ghdhínia - Γδύνια (Greek)*, Gotenhafen (German 1939–1945)*, Hdyniya - Гдиня (Ukrainian)*
(Belgium) Geel	Geel (Dutch*), Gelis (Lithuanian*)
(Netherlands) Geertruidenberg	Geertrudenbarg (Low Saxon*), Geertruidenberg (Dutch*), Gertredenbergas (Lithuanian), Mont-Sainte-Gertrude (French*)
(Slovakia) Gelnica	Geljnica – Гељница (Serbian*), Gelnica (Slovak*), Gelnjica (Serbo-Croatian*), Göllnitz (German*), Gölnicbánya (Hungarian*)
(Belgium) Gembloux	Djiblou (Walloon*), Gemblacum (Latin*), Gembloers (Afrikaans*, Dutch*, Limburgish*, Zeelandic*), Gembloux (French*), Žanblu (Lithuanian*)
(Belgium) Genappe	Djinape (Walloon*), Genapė (Lithuanian), Genappe (French*), Genappia (Latin), Genepiën (Dutch*, Zeelandic*)
(Netherlands) Gendt	Gendt (Dutch*), Gentas (Lithuanian)
(Netherlands) Genemuiden	Gällemuun (Low Saxon*), Genemuiden (Dutch*), Genemedenas (Lithuanian)
(Switzerland) Geneva	Cenevre (Turkish)*, Djeneve (Walloon)*, Genebra (Portuguese)*, Genefa (Welsh)*, Geneva (Romanian)*, Genèva (Arpitan*), Geneve (Afrikaans*, Armenian, Finnish*, Swedish*), Genève (Danish*, Dutch, French*), Genevra (Romansh)*, Genewa (Polish)*, Genf (Estonian*, German*, Icelandic*, Hungarian*), An Ghinéiv (Irish)*, Ginebra (Catalan*, Spanish*), Ginevra (Italian) *, Ġinevra (Maltese), Cenevrə (Azeri)*, Jenewa (Indonesian)*, Jinīf - جنيف (Arabic), Xenebra (Galician)*, Yenévi - Γενεύη (Greek)*, Ženeva - Женева (Bosnian*, Bulgarian*, Croatian*, Czech*, Lithuanian*, Serbian*, Slovak*, Slovene*, Ukrainian*), Ženēva (Latvian) *, Zjenaef (Limburgian)*, Zheneva – ჟენევა (Georgian*), Zhen^{y}eva - Женева (Russian*,), Zhenevë (Albanian)*, Jeneva - ז'נבה (Hebrew)*, Jeneba / Cheneba - 제네바 (Korean), Junēbu - ジュネーブ (Japanese)*, Rineiwa - 日內瓦 (Chinese)*
(Belgium) Genk	Geneche (Latin), Genk (Dutch*, Limburgish*), Genka (Latvian*), Genkas (Lithuanian*)
(Netherlands) Gennep	Genepas (Lithuanian), Gennapium (Latin*), Gennep (Dutch*)
(Italy) Genoa	Cenova (Turkish)*, Đenova (Serbian)*, Dženova (Latvian)*, Gêna (Arpitan*), Gênes (French)*, Gènova (Catalan)*, Genova (Danish*, Finnish*, Hungarian*, Italian*, Romanian*, Slovene*), Génova* - Gênova* ( Brazilian Portuguese), Ġenova (Maltese), Génova (Spanish)*, (European Portuguese) * - Genúa (Icelandic)*, Genua (Danish*, Dutch*, German*, Latin*, Polish*, Swedish*), Genuja (Lithuanian)*, Gjenova (Albanian)*, Janov (Czech*, Slovak*), Jenoba - ジェノバ (Japanese)*, Jenoba / Chenoba - 제노바 (Korean), Xénova (Galician)*, Yénova - Γένοβα*- Γένουα* (Greek), Zena (Ligurian)*
(Belgium) Geraardsbergen	Geraardsbergen (Dutch*), Geraerdsbergen (Zeelandic*), Gerārdsbergena (Latvian), Gerardimontium (Latin), Gėrarsbergenas (Lithuanian), Geroardsbergn (West Flemish*), Grammont (French*)
(North Macedonia) Gevgelija	Gevgelija (English), Djevdjelija (Serbian, Croatian, Bosnian, Slovene), Гевгелија (Macedonian), Gevgeli (Turkish), Gjevgjeli (Albanian)
(Belgium) Ghent	Gænt (Anglo-Saxon*), Gand (French*, Italian*, Picard*, Venetian), Gandavum (Latin*), Gandawa (Polish*), Gant (Aragonese*, Walloon*) Gante (Asturian*, Basque*, Galician*, Portuguese*, Spanish*, Tagalog*), Ganti (Extremaduran*), Gaunt (archaic English*), Gent (Dutch*), Gent - Гент (Belarusian*, Russian*), Gent - גנט (Hebrew*), Gentas (Lithuanian*), Gento (Esperanto*), Ģente (Latvian*), Genteu / Kent'ŭ - 겐트 (Korean), Ghándhi - Γάνδη (Greek*), Ghent (English, Nauru, Pitcairn-Norfolk, Scots*, Waray*), Gint (West Frisian*), Guanto (old Italian*), Jänt (Colognian*)
(United Kingdom) Gibraltar	Cebelitarık (Turkish)*, Cəbəllütarix (Azeri)*, Ġibiltà (Maltese), Gibilterra (Italian)*, Gibraltar (Dutch*, Finnish*, Polish *, Portuguese*, Romanian*, Spanish*), Gibraltar - גיברלטר (Hebrew)*, Gibraltár (Hungarian*), Gibraltaras (Lithuanian)*, Gibraltārs (Latvian)*, Giobraltair or Diobraltair (Scottish Gaelic), Giobráltar (Irish), Ghivraltár - Γιβραλτάρ (Greek)*, Hibraltar - (Tagalog*, Гібралтар Ukrainian)*, Jibraltār - جبرلتار or (older) Jabal Tāriq - جبل طارق (Arabic)*, Jibeurolteo / Chibŭrolt'ŏ - 지브롤터 (Korean), Jiburarutaru - ジブラルタル (Japanese)*, Zhíbùluótuó - 直布羅陀 (Chinese)*
(Slovakia) Giraltovce	Girált (Hungarian*), Giraltovce (Slovak*)
(Spain) Girona	Gerona (Dutch*, German*, Romanian*, Spanish*), Gérone (French)*, Gerunda (Latin)*, Girona (Catalan*, Finnish*, Portuguese*), Xirona (Galician)*
(Belgium) Gistel	Ghistelles (French*), Gistel (Dutch*, French*), Gistelis (Lithuanian), Gistella (Latin)
(Albania) Gjirokastër	Argirocastro (Italian)*,^{[KNAB]} Argirokastro - Аргирокастро (Bulgarian)*, Argyrocastrum (Latin)*, Argyrókastro - Αργυρόκαστρο (Greek)*,^{[KNAB]} Argyrókastron - Αργυρόκαστρον (Byzantine Greek), Đirokastra - Ђирокастра (Serbo-Croatian)*, Ergeri (Turkish),^{[KNAB]} Ergiri (Turkish)*, Ergirikasrı (Turkish), Girokastra - Гирокастра (Russian)*,^{[KNAB]} Ǵirokastro - Ѓирокастро (Macedonian)*, Gjinokastër (Gheg Albanian), Gjirokastër*/Gjirokastra* (Albanian)^{[KNAB]}
(Switzerland) Glarus	Glaris (French)*, Glarona (Italian*, Portuguese*) Glaruna (Romansh)*, Glarus (Dutch*, German*)
(United Kingdom) (England) Glastonbury	Glaistimbir* - Glaistimbir na nGael* - Gloineistir* (Irish)
(United Kingdom) (Scotland) Glasgow	Glaschú (Irish)*, Glaschu (Scottish Gaelic)*, Glásgua (Portuguese, rare)*, Glesga, Glesgae (Scots)*, Glāzgova (Latvian)*, Glaskove - Γλασκώβη (Greek)*, Glazgo - גלזגו (Hebrew)*, Geullaeseugo / Kŭllaesŭgo - 글래스고 (Korean), Gurasugō - グラスゴー (Japanese)*, Glazgas (Lithuanian)*, Glazgo – გლაზგო (Georgian*)
(Poland) Gliwice	Gleiwitz (German)*, Gliwice (Polish)*, Hlivitse - Глівіце (Ukrainian)*
(United Kingdom) (England) Gloucester	Caerloyw (Welsh)*, Gàoluóshìdă - 告羅士打 (Chinese)*, Glocester (French alternate), Gloucester (Dutch, French, German), Glevum (Latin)*
(Poland) Głogów	Glogau (German)*, Glogov (Serbian)*, Glogova (Lithuanian)*, Glogovia (Latin)*, Głogów (Polish)*, Hlohov (Czech, rare)*, Hlohuv - Глогув (Ukrainian)*
(Germany) Glücksburg	Glücksburg (German)*, Lukkuborg (Icelandic)*, Lyksborg (Danish)*
(Austria) Gmünd	Cmunt (Czech, old, obsolete)*, Gmünd (Dutch, French, German)*
(Hungary) Gödöllő	Gödöllő (Hungarian)*, Getterle (former German), Gyodyollyo - Гёдёллё (Russian)*
(Netherlands) Goedereede	Goedereede (Dutch*), Goereê (Zeelandic*)
(Netherlands) Goes	Goes (Dutch*), Gusas (Lithuanian*), Hoes (Zeelandic)
(Belarus) Gomel	Gomel' - Гомель (Russian)*, Homel (German*, Polish*), Homel' - Гомель (Ukrainian)*, Homiel - Гомель (Belarusian)*, Homiel (Romanian)*, Homl - האָמל (Yiddish)
(Netherlands) Goor	Goor (Dutch*), Gora (Latin*), Goras (Lithuanian)
(Netherlands) Gorinchem	Goricum (Latin*), Gorinchem (Dutch*), Gorinchemas (Lithuanian), Gorcum (Spanish*), Gorkem (Zeelandic*), Gorkum (Low German*, Low Saxon*, Western Frisian*)
(Italy) Gorizia	Gorica (Croatian*, Bosnian*, Romanian*, Slovene*, Serbian*), Gorizia (Finnish*, French*, Italian*), Görz (German)*, Gurize (Friulian)*, Gorycja (Polish)
(Germany) Görlitz	Görlitz (Afrikaans*, Dutch*, Finnish*, German*, Romanian*), Zgorzelec (Polish)*, Zhořelec (Czech)*, Zhorjelc (Upper Sorbian)
(Poland) Gorzów Wielkopolski	Gorzów Wielkopolski (Polish)*, Landsberg an der Warthe (German)*
(Sweden) Gothenburg	Gautaborg (Icelandic)*, Gēdébǎo - 哥德堡 (Chinese)*, Gēteborga (Latvian)*, Gioteburgas (Lithuanian)*, Goateboarch (West Frisian*), Göteborg (Dutch*, Estonian*, Finnish*, French*, German*, Polish*, Romanian*, Swedish*), Gøteborg (Norwegian*, Danish*), Göteburg (Turkish)*, Gotemburgo (Italian*, Portuguese*, Spanish*), Gotenburg (Afrikaans*, Dutch alternate*, former German*, former Polish*), Gothembourg (former French)*, Gutenburgu (Maltese), Yetebori / Yet'ebori - 예테보리 (Korean), Yōtebori - ヨーテボリ / Ietebori - イエテボリ (Japanese)*
(Germany) Göttingen	Chöttingen (Low German)*, Getingen - Гетинген (Serbian)*, Gėtingenas (Lithuanian)*, Getinggen - 哥廷根 (Chinese)*, Gettingen - ゲッティンゲン (Japanese)*, Getynga (Polish)*, Getynky (Czech, old, obsolete)*, Goettinga (Latin)*, Gœttingue or Gottingue (French)*, Gotinga (Spanish*, Portuguese*), Göttinga (medieval Hungarian)*, Gottinga (Italian)*, Gottingē - Γοττίγγη (Greek, καθαρεύουσα)*, Göttingen (Dutch*, German*, Turkish*), Gyotingen - Гьотинген (Bulgarian)*, Gyottingen - Гёттинген (Kazakh*, Russian*)
(Netherlands) Gouda	Gauda (Latvian*), Gauda – Гауда (Serbian*), Gouda (Dutch*), Guda (Latin*), Tergum (alternative Latin), Quda (Azerbaijani*)
(Netherlands) Grafhorst	Graffest (Low Saxon*), Grafhorst (Dutch*)
(Netherlands) Gramsbergen	Gramsbargen (Low Saxon*), Gramsbergen (Dutch*)
(Poland) Gramzow	Gramzow (German)*, Grębowo (Polish)*
(Spain) Granada	al-Ġarnāda - غرناطة (Arabic)*, Elibyrge - Ἐλιβύργη (Ancient Greek)*, Granada (Dutch*, Interlingua, Italian*, Latvian*, Lithuanian*, Maltese, Portuguese*, Romanian*, Spanish*), Grenade (French)*, Ghranadha - Γρανάδα (Greek)*, Grenada (Polish)*, Guranada - グラナダ (Japanese) *, Geuranada / Kŭranada - 그라나다 (Korean), Illiberis* or Illiberi Liberini* (Latin)
(Netherlands) Grave	Graeve (Zeelandic*), Grave (Dutch*), Gravė (Lithuanian), Gravia (Latin)
(Austria) Graz	Geuracheu/Kŭrach'ŭ - 그라츠 (Korean)*, Grác (Serbian*, alternative Hungarian), Grāca (Latvian)*, Gracas (Lithuanian)*, Gradac (Croatian)*, Gradec (Slovene)*, Graecia or Graecium (Latin)*, Grats - Грац (Belarusian*, Bulgarian*, Russian*), Grats - Γκρατς (Greek)*, Gratsi – გრაცი (Georgian)*, Gratz or Graz (French)*, Graz (Dutch*, Finnish*, German*, Hungarian*, Italian*, Romanian*, Swedish*, Turkish*), Grodziec (Polish)*, Gurātsu - グラーツ (Japanese)*, Hrats - Грац (Ukrainian)*, Štýrský Hradec (Czech)*, غراتس (Arabic)*, 格拉茨 (Chinese)*, گراتس (Persian)*, גראץ (Hebrew)*
(Germany) Greifswald	Greifswald (Afrikaans*, Dutch*, French*, German*), Gryfia (Polish*, Pomeranian)
(France) Grenoble	Cularo (Gaulish, old Latin)*, Qrönobl (Azeri)*, Grasanòbol (Occitan)*, Gratianopolis (Latin)*, Γκρενόμπλ (Greek)*, Grenobla (Portuguese)*, Grenoble (Dutch*, French*, Italian*, Romanian*), Гренобль (русский)*
(Netherlands) Groenlo	Groenlo (Dutch*), Grolle (Low German*, Low Saxon*), Grunlas (Lithuanian)
(Netherlands) Groningen	Greunienge (Zeelandic), Grins (Western Frisian*), Groningburg (Anglo-Saxon*), Groninga (Galician*, Italian*, Latin*, Lombard*, Occitan*, Portuguese*, Spanish*, Venetian*), Gròninga (Sicilian*), Groninge (Limburgish*), Groningen (Dutch*), Groningena (Latvian*), Groningenas (Lithuanian*) Groningue (French*), Groningenas (Lithuanian*), Groningeni – გრონინგენი (Georgian*), Grunn(en) (Low Saxon*), Grunneng (Low German*), Qroningen (Azerbaijani*)
(Russia) Grozny	Caharkala* or Caharkale* (Turkish alternates), Djovkhar Ghaala (alternative Chechen (separatist)), Džochargala (alternative Lithuanian name)*, Geurojeuni / Kŭrojŭni - 그로즈니 (Korean)*, Groznas (Lithuanian)*, Grozni (Turkish*, Slovene*), Groznîi (Romanian)*, Groznija (Latvian)*, Grozno – გროზნო (Georgian*), Grozny (Polish)*, Groznyi (Finnish)*, Groznyy - Грозный (Russian)*, Gurozunui - グロズヌイ (Japanese)*, Hroznyy - Грозний (Ukrainian)*, Sölƶ-Ġala - Соьлж-ГIала (Chechen)
(Poland) Grudziądz	Graudenz (German)*, Grudziądz (Polish)*,
(Germany) Günzburg	Günzburg (German)*, Gunzburgo (Portuguese*, Spanish*)
(Russia) Gusev	Gąbin (Polish)*, Gumbinė (Lithuanian)*, Gumbinnen (German)*, Gusev - Гусев (Russian)*
(Hungary) Győr	Arrabona / Arabona^{[KNAB]} (ancient Latin), Đer - Ђер (Serbian*), Dėras^{[KNAB]} (Lithuanian*), Djer - Дєр /D'jor - Дьйор (Ukrainian*), Đur - Ђур (older Serbian*, older Croatian), Dyor - Дьёр (Russian*^{[KNAB]}), Ģēra (Latvian*), Gyar (Romanian), Győr (Hungarian*), Janok - Јанок (historic Serbian), Jaurinum (medieval Latin), Jawaryn (older Polish*), Jēru - ジェール (Japanese*), Jiāo'ěr - 焦爾 (Mandarin Chinese - Taiwan usage*), Jié'ěr - 杰尔 [simplified characters] / 杰爾 [traditional characters] (Mandarin Chinese*), Jìuyíh - 焦爾 (Cantonese), Jura (Croatian), Jwereu / Chwerŭ - 죄르 (Korean)*, Làbǎi - 腊佰 (older Chinese), Raab (German)*,^{[KNAB]} Ráb (older Czech*,^{[KNAB]} older Slovak^{[KNAB]}), Vjura (older Croatian), Yanıkkale (historic Turkish*), Zhuó'ěr - 卓爾 (older Chinese)

== H ==
English name	Other names or former names
(Netherlands) Haarlem	Garlem (alternative Uzbek), Haarlem (Dutch*), Haarlim (Western Frisian*), Haorlem (Low Saxon*), Harlem (Azerbaijani), Hārlema (Latvian*), Harlemas (Lithuanian*), Harlemo (Esperanto*), Harlemum (Latin*), Xarlem (Uzbek*)
(Netherlands) Haastrecht	'Aestrecht (Zeelandic*), Haastrecht (Dutch*), Hastreichtas (Lithuanian)
(Denmark) Haderslev	Hadersleben (German)*, Haderslev (Danish)*
(France) Haguenau	Hagenau (German)*, Haguenau (French)*
(Norway) Halden	Fredrikshald (former name)*
(Belgium) Halen	Haelen (alternative French*), Halen (Dutch* French*), Halenium (Latin), Hôle (Limburgish*)
(Belgium) Halle	Hal (French*), Hala (archaic Italian*), Halė (Lithuanian), Håle (Walloon), Halla (Latin, archaic Spanish*), Halle (Dutch*), Hao (archaic Spanish*)
(Germany) Hamburg	Amburgo (Italian)*, Amvúrgho - Αμβούργο (Greek)*, Gamburg - Гамбург (Russian)*, Hamborig (North Frisian*), Hamborg (Danish*, Low Saxon*, Icelandic), Hambourg (French)*, Hambörg (Gronings), Hamburch (West Frisian*), Hamburg (Afrikaans*, Catalan*, Croatian*, Estonian*, German*, Hungarian*, Polish*, Romanian*, Scottish Gaelic*, Serbian*, Slovak*, Slovene*, Swedish*, Turkish*), Hambūrġ (Arabic), Hamburga (Latvian)*, Hamburgas (Lithuanian)*, Hamburgi – ჰამბურგი (Georgian*), Hamburgo (Portuguese*, Spanish*), Ħamburgu (Maltese), Hamburk (Czech)*, Hammaburgum (traditional Latin name)*, Hammonia (modern Latin name)*, Hampuri (Finnish)*, Hambureukeu / Hamburŭk'ŭ - 함부르크 (Korean), Hamburuku - ハンブルク (Japanese)*, Hanbao - 漢堡 (Chinese)*
(Finland) Hämeenlinna	Hämeenlinna (Estonian*, Finnish*), Tavastehus (Swedish)*
(Germany) Hamelin	Hamelen (Dutch)*, Hamelin (French*, Italian*, Portuguese*, Romanian*), Hamelín (Spanish) *, Hameln (German*, Finnish*)
(Finland) Hamina	Hamina (Finnish), Fredrikshamn (Swedish)
(Belgium) Hamont-Achel	Haëmet-Achel (Limburgish*), Hamont-Achel (Dutch*)
(Germany) Hanau	Hanau (German*, Romanian*), Hanava (Czech, old, obsolete)*
(Slovakia) Handlová	Handlova (Azerbaijani*, Serbo-Croatian*), Handlova – Хандлова (Serbian*), Handlová (Slovak*), Krickerhau (German*), Mercatoria (Latin*), Nyitrabánya (Hungarian*)
(Belgium) Hannut	Hannut (French*), Hannuit (Dutch*), Haneu (alternative Walloon*), Hanu (Walloon*), Hanutum (Latin)
(Germany) Hanover	Anóvero - Αννόβερο (Greek)*, Ganover - Гановер (Russian)*, Hannover (Azeri*, Dutch*, Estonian*, Finnish*, German*, Italian*, Swedish*, Turkish*), Hannovere (Latvian) *, Hànnuòwei - 漢諾威 (Chinese)*, Hanòbhar (Scottish Gaelic)*, Hanôve (Walloon)*, Hanôver (Portuguese)*, Hanóver (Spanish)*, Hanovere (Latvian)*, Hanoveris (Lithuanian) *, Hanovra (Romanian)*, Hanobeo / Hanobŏ - 하노버 (Korean), Hanovre (French) *, Hanower (Polish)*, Hanōbā - ハノーバー / Hanōfā - ハノーファー (Japanese)*
(Sweden) Haparanda	Haaparanta (Finnish*, Meänkieli), Háhpárándi (Northern Sami)*, Haparanda (Swedish)*
(Netherlands) Hardenberg	Hardenbarg (Low Saxon*), Hardenberg (Dutch*), Hardenbergas (Lithuanian)
(Belgium) Harelbeke	Aorelbeke (Zeelandic*), Harelbeke (Dutch*), Harelbekė (Lithuanian*), Oarelbeke (West Flemish*)
(Netherlands) Harderwijk	Hardervic (French*), Hardervicum (Latin*) Harderveikas (Lithuanian), Harderwiek (Low German*, Low Saxon*, Zeelandic*), Harderwijk (Dutch*), Harderwyk (Western Frisian*)
(Netherlands) Harlingen	Harlingen (Dutch*), Harlingenas (Lithuanian), Harns (Northern Frisian, Western Frisian*, Saterland Frisian*)
(Sweden) Härnösand	Härnösand (Swedish)*, Herniosandas (Lithuanian)*, Hernosandia (Latin)*, Hernusando (Esperanto)*, Hïernesaande (Southern Sami)
(Belgium) Hasselt	Haselta (Latvian*), Haseltas (Lithuanian*), Haselto (Esperanto*), Hasse (Walloon*), Hasselatum (alternative Latin*), Hasseletum (Latin*), Hasselt (Dutch*, French*, German*, Limburgish*, Romanian*)
(Netherlands) Hasselt	Asselt (Low German*, Low Saxon*), Hasselt (Dutch*), Haseltas (Lithuanian)
(Slovakia) Hanušovce nad Topľou	Hansdorf an der Töpl (German*), Hanušovce nad Topľou (Slovak*), Hanušovce na Toploj (Serbo-Croatian*), Hanušovce pie Topļas (Latvian*), Tapolyhanusfalva (Hungarian*)
(Netherlands) Hattem	Attem (Low German*, Low Saxon*), Hatemas (Lithuanian), Hattem (Dutch*), Hattemium (Latin*)
(Netherlands) Heerlen	Coriovallum (Latin*), Heële (Limburgish*), Heerlen (Dutch*), Hērlena (Latvian*), Hirlenas (Lithuanian)
(Germany) Heligoland	Deät Lunn (North Frisian (Halunder))*, Hålilönj (North Frisian (Mooring)), Hälgelound (Saterland Frisian)*, Helgolân (Frisian)*, Helgoland (Czech*, Dutch*, German*, Polish*, Romanian*, Turkish*), Heligoland (French)*, Heligolândia (Portuguese)*, Terra Sacra (Latin)*
(Netherlands) Helmond	Helmond (Dutch*), Helmonda (Latvian*), Helmondas (Lithuanian*)
(Sweden) Helsingborg	Hè'ěrxīnbăo - 赫爾辛堡(Chinese)*, Helsimburgo (Portuguese)*, Helsingborg (Danish*, Dutch, Finnish*, French, German*, Swedish*),Helsingjaborg (Icelandic* Helsingburg (former German)*, Helsingbörg (Gronings), Hälsingborg (former Swedish)
(Finland) Helsinki	Chielsynki - Хельсынкі (Belarusian)*, Elsenfors (Dutch [rare])*, Elsínki - Ελσίνκι (Greek)*, Gel'singfors - Гельсингфорс (former Russian), Harshanca - ཧིར་ཤིན་ཅ (Tibetan)*, Hè'ěrxīnjī - 赫尔辛基 (Chinese)*, Heilsincí (Irish)*, Helsig (Inari Sami), Helsingfors (Norwegian*, Swedish*, Danish *, former German*), Helsingforsia (former Latin name)*, Helsingi (Estonian)*, Helsingia (Latin)*, Helsingki / Helsingk'i - 헬싱키 (Korean)*, Helsink'i - ჰელსინკი (Georgian)*, Helsinki (Azeri*, Danish*, Finnish*, French*, German*, Italian*, Latvian*, Polish*, Romanian*, Serbian*, Slovene*, Spanish*, Turkish*), Hèlsinki (Arpitan*), Helsiņki - হেলসিঙ্কি (Bengali)*, Helsinkī - हेलसिंकी (Hindi, Marathi*), Ħelsinki (Maltese), Hel'sinki - Гельсінкі or Khel'sinki - Хельсінкі (Ukrainian)*, Helsinkis (Lithuanian)*, Helsinky (Czech)*, Helsinque (Brazilian Portuguese)*, Helsínquia (Portuguese)*, Heʹlssen (Skolt Sami), Helsset (Northern Sami), Helzinki - Хелзинки (Bulgarian)*, Herushinki - ヘルシンキ (Japanese)*, Hilsīnkī - هلسنكي (Arabic)*, Khel'sinki - Хельсинки (Russian)*, Stadi and Hesa (local slang)
(Greece) Heraklion	Càndia (Catalan)*, Candia (Italian*, Spanish*), Cândia* / Héraclion * (Portuguese), Candie (old French)*, Heraklion (German*, Romanian*), Héraklion (French)*, Herak'lioni – ჰერაკლიონი (Georgian*), Iraklio - Ηράκλειο (Greek)*, Iraklion (Finnish*, Polish*, Serbian*, Romanian*), Kandiye (Turkish)*
(Belgium) Herentals	Herentalia (Latin), Herentals (Dutch*), Hėrentalsas (Lithuanian)
(Belgium) Herk-de-Stad	Herck-la-Ville (French*), Herk (Limburgish*), Herka (Latin), Herk-de-Stad (Dutch*)
(Belgium) Herstal	Charistalius (Latin*), Harastallius (alternative Latin*), Heristalium (alternative Latin*), Hesta (Walloon*), Herstal (French*), Herstalis (Lithuanian*)
(Belgium) Herve	Herf (Limburgish*), Herve (French*), Harvia (Latin), Heve (Walloon*)
(Germany) Herzogenrath	's-Hertogenrade (Dutch*), Herzogenrath (German*), Rode-le-Duc (French*)
(Netherlands) Hindeloopen	Hindeloopen (Dutch*), Hindeloôpen (Zeelandic*), Hylpen (Northern Frisian*, Western Frisian*, Low German*, Saterland Frisian*)
(Slovakia) Hlohovec	Freistad(l) an der Waag (German*), Galgóc (Hungarian*), Glogovec – Глоговец (Kazakh*), Hlohovec (Slovak*), Hlohovec – Хлоховец (Serbian*), Hlohoveca (Latvian*), Hlohovecas (Lithuanian*), Hlohovets (Azerbaijani*), Holok (Turkish*)
(Slovakia) Hnúšťa	Hnúšťa (Slovak*), Hnuštja (Serbo-Croatian*), Hnuštja – Хнуштја (Serbian*), Hnūštja (Latvian*), Nusten (German*), Nyustya (Hungarian*)
(Slovakia) Holíč	Holíč (Slovak*), Holīča (Latvian*), Holics (Hungarian*), Holitsch (German*), Holyčius (Lithuanian*), Weißkirchen (an der March) (alternative German)
(United Kingdom) (Wales) Holyhead	Caergybi (Welsh)*, Caergybi (Scottish Gaelic)*, Shèngshǒu - 圣首/聖首 (Mandarin)
(Belgium) Hoogstraten	Hogstrate (French*), Hogstratenas (Lithuanian), Hoogstraten (Dutch*), 'Oôgstraeten (Zeelandic*)
(Netherlands) Hoogwoud	Alta Silua (Latin), Heechwâld (Western Frisian*), Hoogwoud (Dutch*)
(Netherlands) Hoorn	Hoarn (Western Frisian*), Hoorn (Dutch*), Horna (Latvian*), Hornas (Lithuanian*)
(Belgium) Houffalize	Haufelescht (Luxembougish*), Hohenfels (German*), Houffalize (French*), Oufalijhe (Walloon*)
(Germany) Hoyerswerda	Hojeřice (Czech)*, Hoyerswerda (German)*, Wojerecy (Upper Sorbian)*, Wojrowice (Polish)*, Wórjejce (Lower Sorbian)*
(Slovakia) Hriňová	Herencsvölgy (Hungarian*), Hrinau (German*), Hrinjova (Serbo-Croatian*), Hrinjova – Хрињова (Serbian*), Hriňová (Slovak*), Hriņova (Latvian*)
(Belarus) Hrodna	Gardinas (Lithuanian)*, Garten (former German)*, Grodna (Latin)*, Grodņa (Latvian)*, Grodno (Czech*, Finnish*, French*, Polish*, Romanian*), Grodno - Гродно (Bulgarian*, Russian*), Grodne - גראָדנע (Yiddish)*, Harodnia - Гародня or Horadnia - Горадня (classical Belarusian)*, Hrodna - Гродна (Belarusian), Hrodno - Гродно (Ukrainian)*
(Spain) Huesca	Huesca (Spanish)*, Huèsca (Arpitan*), Osca (Catalan*, Latin*), Òsca (Occitan), Oska (Basque)*, Uesca (Aragonese)*
(Netherlands) Huissen	Huissen (Dutch*), Huussen (Zeelandic*), Juisas (Lithuanian)
(Netherlands) Hulst	Hilsta (Latvian), Hulst (Dutch*), 'Ulst (Zeelandic*)
(Croatia) Hum	Cholm (German)*, Colmo (Italian)*, Hum (Croatian*, Romanian*, Serbian)
(Slovakia) Humenné	Homenau (German*), Homonna (Hungarian*), Humenė (Lithuanian*), Humenje (Serbo-Croatian*), Humenje – Хумење (Serbian*), Humеnnе (Azerbaijani*, Latvian*), Humenné (Slovak*)
(Slovakia) Hurbanovo	Altdala (German*), Hurbanovo (Slovak*), Hurbanovo – Хурбаново (Serbian*), Ógyalla (Hungarian*), Stará Ďala (archaic Slovak)
(Belgium) Huy	Hju (Lithuanian), Hoei (Dutch* Limburgish*, Zeelandic*), Hoium (Latin), Huy (French)*, Hu (Walloon*, German*), Ija (Latvian)
