= Żółcino =

- Village
- Location within Poland
- Coordinates: 53°59′N 14°46′E
- Country: Poland
- Voivodeship: West Pomeranian
- County: Kamień
- Gmina: Kamień Pomorski

Żółcino [ʐuu̯ˈt͡ɕinɔ] (German: Soltin) is a village in the administrative district of Gmina Kamień Pomorski, within Kamień County, West Pomeranian Voivodeship, in north-western Poland. It lies approximately 2 km (1 mi) north-west of Kamień Pomorski and 65 km (40 mi) north of the regional capital Szczecin.

For the history of the region, see History of Pomerania.
