= Willi Bloedorn =

German farmer and Nazi Party politician

Landesbauernführer, Pomerania
- In office Spring 1933 – 8 May 1945

Kreisdeputierter, Cammin Kreis
- In office Spring 1933 – 8 May 1945

Legislative positions
- 1933–1945: Reichstag Deputy
- 1932–1933: Landtag of Prussia Deputy

Personal details
- Born: Wilhelm Bloedorn; 6 April 1887 Kucklow, Pomerania, Kingdom of Prussia, German Empire
- Died: 24 March 1946 (aged 58) NKVD special camp Nr. 9, Soviet occupation zone
- Party: Nazi Party
- Occupation: Farmer
- Awards: Knight's Cross of the War Merit Cross

Military service
- Allegiance: German Empire
- Branch/service: Imperial German Army
- Years of service: 1914–1918
- Unit: 44th (7th East Prussian) Infantry Regiment; Landwehr Infantry Regiment 76
- Battles/wars: World War I

Wilhelm "Willi" Bloedorn (6 April 1887 – 24 March 1946) was a German landowner and politician. He was a member of the Nazi Party and its paramilitary organization, the Sturmabteilung, in which he rose to the rank of SA-Gruppenführer. He served as a Party agricultural specialist and a district administrator, and also was elected to the Landtag of Prussia and the Reichstag. After the end of the Second World War, he died in a Soviet NKVD special camp.

== Early life ==
Bloedorn was born in Kucklow (today, Kukułowo) in the Prussian Province of Pomerania and attended elementary school from 1893 to 1901. After additional training in agriculture, he took over the management of his grandparents' farm in 1909. On 1 November 1914, he joined the Imperial German Army and took part in the First World War with the 44th (7th East Prussian) Infantry Regiment, during which he suffered a serious wound on 23 May 1915. After his recovery, he was deployed in a Landsturm unit and in Landwehr Infantry Regiment 76 until he was discharged from the military on 3 December 1918, shortly after the end of the war. In the interwar period, Bloedorn returned to running his estate. He also sat on the board of the Pomeranian Chamber of Agriculture and was the chairman of the Farmers' Association of Cammin Kreis (today, Kamień County) and also of the Pomeranian Farmers' Association.

== Nazi Party career ==
Bloedorn joined the Nazi Party on 1 February 1930 (membership number 188,880). He also became a member of its paramilitary organization, the Sturmabteilung (SA). In this unit he was promoted to SA-Standartenführer in April 1936, to SA-Brigadeführer on 30 January 1939 and to SA-Gruppenführer on 9 November 1944. Also serving as a Party official, Bloedorn was the Gauamtsleiter (Gau office manager) for Agricultural Policy in Gau Pomerania from 1930. In 1932, he was elected as a deputy to the Landtag of Prussia, serving until its dissolution by the Nazis on 14 October 1933. After the Nazi seizure of power, he was appointed the Landesbauernführer (state farmers leader) for Pomerania in the spring of 1933. He also sat on the Pomeranian Provincial Council and was named the Kreisdeputierter (district deputy) of Cammin Kreis. At the parliamentary election of November 1933, he was elected as a deputy to the Reichstag from electoral constituency 6 (Pomerania) where he served until the fall of the Nazi regime.

In addition to his government and Party obligations, Bloedorn also sat on the supervisory boards and administrative boards of many large banks, insurance companies and utilities that serviced farmers, including the Deutsche Industriebank, the Landwirtschaftliche Rentenbank, the Deutsche Bauerndienst Allgemeine-Versicherungs AG and the Märkisches Elektrizitätswerk.

On 14 February 1940, Bloedorn issued a directive that sanctioned the inhumane treatment of Polish forced laborers within the area of his jurisdiction in Cammin Kreis. In April 1941, he became a member of the Reich Advisory Council for Food and Agriculture. At the end of the war, Bloedorn was arrested by the Red Army and taken to the NKVD special camp Nr. 9 in Fünfeichen, a section of Neubrandenburg, where he died in March 1946.

== Sources ==
- Information about Willi Bloedorn in the Reichstag database
- Lilla, Joachim; Döring, Martin; Schulz, Andreas (2004). Statisten in Uniform. Die Mitglieder des Reichstags 1933–1945. Ein biographisches Handbuch. Unter Einbeziehung der völkischen und nationalsozialistischen Reichstagsabgeordneten ab Mai 1924. Düsseldorf: Droste. pp. 44–45. ISBN 978-3-770-05254-7
- Podewin, Norbert; Dengler, Gerhard (2002). Braunbuch: Kriegs- und Nazi- Verbrecher. Berlin: Edition Ost. ISBN 978-3-360-01033-9.
- Stockhorst, Erich (1985). 5000 Köpfe: Wer War Was im 3. Reich. Arndt. ISBN 978-3-887-41116-9.
