= Adolphus Asher =

German bookseller, publisher and bibliographer (1800–1853)

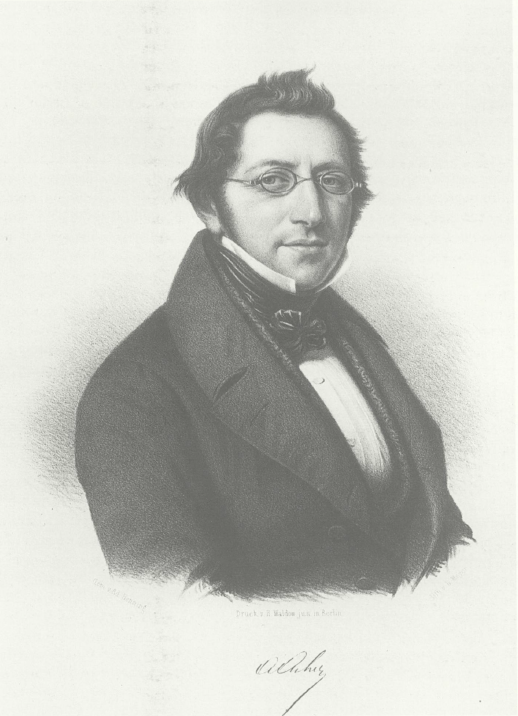
- Born: Abraham Isaac Ascher; 23 August 1800; Cammin, Pomerania
- Died: 1 September 1853 (aged 53); Venice, Austrian Empire
- Occupations: Bookseller, publisher, bibliographer

Adolphus Asher (1800–1853), often referred to as Adolf Asher, was a German bookseller, publisher, bibliographer, Hebraist, and Anglophile. He is remembered as a major contributor to the British Museum's Russian and Eastern European book collections and for his learned bibliographies which are still consulted today.

== Life and career ==
Adolphus Asher was born Abraham Isaac Ascher on 23 August 1800 into a Jewish family in Cammin, Pomerania (now Kamień Pomorski, Poland). He attended the Gymnasium zum Grauen Kloster in Berlin where he exhibited an apitude for learning foreign languages which would later "serve him well in both his international trading and his scholarly bibliographical studies". After leaving school he spent the years 1820–25 as a merchant and "learning business methods" in England and then spent the years 1825–30 in St. Petersburg, Russia where he made a fortune trading in diamonds. In 1824 he married Anna, née Friedeberg (1806–1866) and in 1827 they had a son, Georg Michael.

In 1830 he opened a bookshop at Mohrenstrasse 53, Berlin, followed in 1835 by another in Covent Garden, London and then by a third in St. Petersburg. His bookshops sold new, secondhand and antiquarian works. His firm did business first as A. Asher's Library and then from 1839 traded as A. Asher & Co.; and it later extended its activities into book publishing.

Asher befriended Anthony Panizzi, a librarian (and later the principal librarian) at the British Museum Library, and from 1840 became one of the main suppliers of continental and antiquarian books to that library, in the process building up its Russian and eastern European collections, which until that time had been "almost non-existent". Asher also supplied books to prominent scholars such as Alexander von Humboldt and Charles Darwin and to the Hebrew collection of the Bodleian Library, Oxford.

In 1839 Asher published the first of a series of scholarly annotated bibliographical essays on various subjects, essays which have continued to be consulted by scholars and booksellers to this day. He also became known as versed in Hebrew language and literature. In 1840, with the support of renowned scholars, he published a critical edition in London and Berlin of the travelogues of the 12th century Jewish traveller Benjamin of Tudela. In 1848 he was listed as a member of the Deutsche Morgenländische Gesellschaft. For a time he was a member of the board of the Jüdischen Gemeinde zu Berlin (English, "Jewish Community of Berlin").

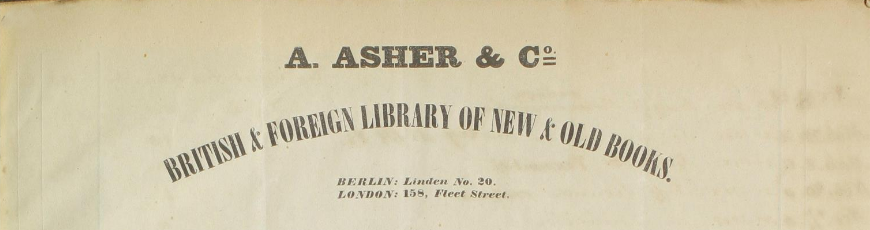
A. Asher & Co., of Berlin and London, invoice letterhead, circa 1848

In 1848 Asher moved his Berlin bookshop to Unter den Linden 20, a location close to the Royal Prussian Academy of Sciences, which would subsequently become another important bookshop client.

In 1849–1850 Asher conducted a successful auction of the "remarkable" private library of the German poet, fiction writer, translator, and critic Ludwig Tieck.

For several decades Asher was periodically quoted and his opinions discussed in official British enquiries into copyright, the book trade and international trade.

In 1852 Asher sold his firm A. Asher & Co.

On 2 September 1853, during a business trip to Venice, Asher died of gastric-nervous fever. His widow, Anna Asher, died on 20 November 1866. His son, Georg Michael Asher, had a varied career in Russia, Germany, England and France, becoming a professor of Roman law in Heidelberg, and died in 1905. Although declining to join the booktrade, he followed his bibliographer father by penning A Bibliographical and Historical Essay on the Dutch Books and Pamphlets Relating to New-Netherland, and to the Dutch West-India company and to its Possessions in Brazil, Angola, etc. (1868).

== A. Asher & Co. after 1853 ==
After its founder's death A. Asher & Co. continued trading under the ownership of two former employees Daniel Collin and the literary scholar and bibliographer Albert Cohn (1827–1905), with the latter remaining "the most important A. Asher & Co. figure in the firm for fifty years after Asher’s death". The firm continued supplying antiquarian and current material to the British Museum "until communications were disrupted by war in the twentieth century". In 1874 the firm's ownership was passed to Adolf Behrend and Leonhard Simion. In 1906, the publishing house division of the firm separated from the bookshop division with the former henceforth trading as Behrend & Co. and the latter as A. Asher & Co. After Cohn's death in 1907 resulted in a downturn and after the First World War caused "trade (especially international trade)" to come to a standstill for some years, A. Asher & Co. saw its fortunes revive from 1919 as it was once again "importing and exporting modern books", now from its new premises at Behrenstraße 17, Berlin. The ownership passed to Hermann Lazarus and then to Otto Liebstaedter. In 1933 he firm was Aryanized by the Nazis and Liebstaedter fled to Amsterdam, taking with him part of the book stock. In 1947 he set up a bookshop under the name A. Asher & Co. B. V., which as at 2025 continues to trade in the Netherlands.

== Books written by Adolphus Asher ==
- Asher's Picture of Berlin and Its Environs Containing a Copious Account of Every Object Worthy of Inspection in the Metropolis of Prussia, in Charlottenburg and Podsdam : to which is added: A List of German Classic Authors and of Their Preeminent Works, Berlin: 1837.
- Bibliographical Essay on the Collection of Voyages and Travels Edited and Published by Levinus Hulsius and His Successors, at Nuremberg and Francfort from Anno 1598 to 1660, Berlin: 1839.
- Itinerary of Rabbi Benjamin of Tudela, Berlin and London: 1840–1841 – Hebrew text, edited and with an English translation, notes and essays by A. Asher – Volume I; Volume II.
- Bibliographical Essay on the Scriptores Rerum Germanicarum, Berlin: 1843.

== Publications by A. Asher & Co. ==
=== Book series ===
- Asher's Collection of English Authors – British and American
- Heath's Pictureque Annual (jointly published with other publishers)
- The Necropolis of Ancon in Peru, a Contribution to our Knowledge of the Culture and Industries of the Empire of the Incas
- Neudrucke von Schriften und Karten über Meteorologie und Erdmagnetismus
- Tombleson's Rhein-Ansichten
- Wissenschaftliche Ergebnisse der Schwedischen Südpolar-Expedition 1901–1903

=== Catalogues ===
- Catalogue de la bibliothèque célèbre de M. Ludwig Tieck qui sera vendue à Berlin le 10. décembre 1849 et jours suivants par MM. A. Asher & Comp., Berlin: A. Asher (for London agent David Nutt), 1849.
- Catalogue d'une collection précieuse de livres rares et curieux concernants la Pologne, la Russie et autres pays slaves, Berlin: chez A. Asher & Co., 1858.

=== Periodicals ===
- Zeitschrift des Vereins für Volkskunde
