= Rekowo, Gmina Kamień Pomorski =

Rekowo
- Village
- Location within Poland
- Coordinates: 53°53′20″N 14°47′26″E
- Country: Poland
- Voivodeship: West Pomeranian
- County: Kamień
- Gmina: Kamień Pomorski

Rekowo [rɛˈkɔvɔ] (German: Reckow) is a village in the administrative district of Gmina Kamień Pomorski, within Kamień County, West Pomeranian Voivodeship, in north-western Poland. It lies approximately 9 km (6 mi) south of Kamień Pomorski and 55 km (34 mi) north of the regional capital Szczecin.

For the history of the region, see History of Pomerania.
