= Płastkowo =

- Village
- Location within Poland
- Coordinates: 53°53′35″N 14°49′47″E
- Country: Poland
- Voivodeship: West Pomeranian
- County: Kamień
- Gmina: Kamień Pomorski

Płastkowo [pwastˈkɔvɔ] (German: Plastichow) is a village in the administrative district of Gmina Kamień Pomorski, within Kamień County, West Pomeranian Voivodeship, in north-western Poland.

For the history of the region, see History of Pomerania.
