= Strzeżewko =

- Village
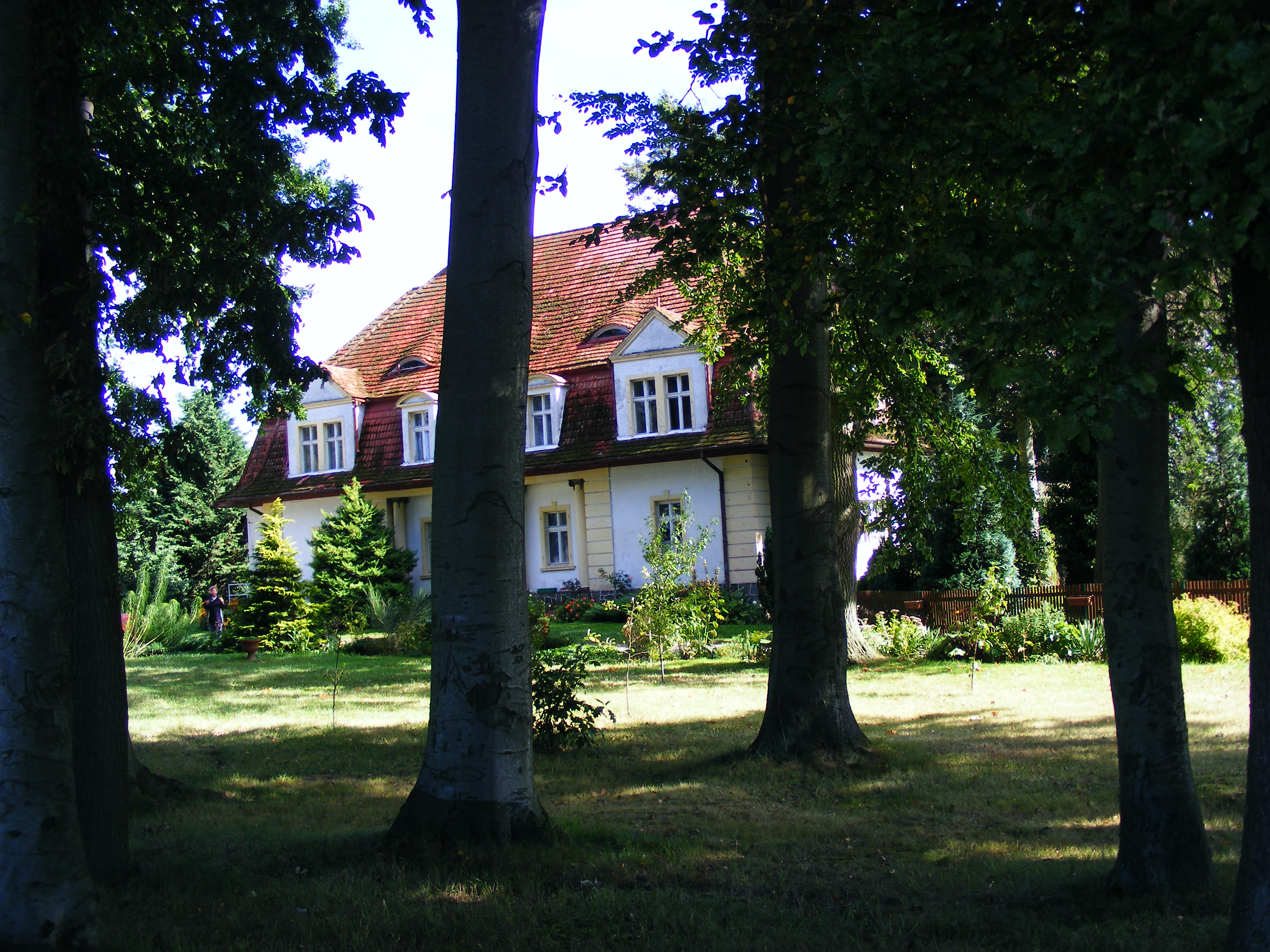

- Location within Poland
- Coordinates: 54°01′21″N 14°52′19″E
- Country: Poland
- Voivodeship: West Pomeranian
- County: Kamień
- Gmina: Kamień Pomorski

Strzeżewko [stʂɛˈʐɛfkɔ] (German: Klein Stresow) is a village in the administrative district of Gmina Kamień Pomorski, within Kamień County, West Pomeranian Voivodeship, in north-western Poland.
