= Kukułowo =

- Village
- Location within Poland
- Coordinates: 53°55′7″N 14°42′3″E
- Country: Poland
- Voivodeship: West Pomeranian
- County: Kamień
- Gmina: Kamień Pomorski

Kukułowo [kukuˈwɔvɔ] (German: Kucklow) is a village in the administrative district of Gmina Kamień Pomorski, within Kamień County, West Pomeranian Voivodeship, in north-western Poland. It lies approximately 8 km (5 mi) south-west of Kamień Pomorski and 57 km (35 mi) north of the regional capital Szczecin.

For the history of the region, see History of Pomerania.
