= Grębowo =

- Village
- Location within Poland
- Coordinates: 53°56′52″N 14°51′46″E
- Country: Poland
- Voivodeship: West Pomeranian
- County: Kamień
- Gmina: Kamień Pomorski

Grębowo [ɡrɛmˈbɔvɔ] (German: Grambow) is a village in the administrative district of Gmina Kamień Pomorski, within Kamień County, West Pomeranian Voivodeship, in north-western Poland. It lies approximately 6 km (4 mi) south-east of Kamień Pomorski and 62 km (39 mi) north of the regional capital Szczecin.

For the history of the region, see History of Pomerania.
