= Rzewnowo =

- Village
- Location within Poland
- Coordinates: 53°56′20″N 14°49′24″E
- Country: Poland
- Voivodeship: West Pomeranian
- County: Kamień
- Gmina: Kamień Pomorski

Rzewnowo [ʐɛvˈnɔvɔ] (German: Revenow) is a village in the administrative district of Gmina Kamień Pomorski, within Kamień County, West Pomeranian Voivodeship, in north-western Poland. It lies approximately 5 km (3 mi) south-east of Kamień Pomorski and 61 km (38 mi) north of the regional capital Szczecin.

For the history of the region, see History of Pomerania.
