= Wrzosowo, Kamień County =

Wrzosowo
- Village
- Location within Poland
- Coordinates: 54°0′54″N 14°48′44″E
- Country: Poland
- Voivodeship: West Pomeranian
- County: Kamień
- Gmina: Kamień Pomorski
- Population: 620

Wrzosowo ([vʐɔˈsɔvɔ] (German: Fritzow) is a village in the administrative district of Gmina Kamień Pomorski, within Kamień County, West Pomeranian Voivodeship, in north-western Poland. It lies approximately 6 km (4 mi) north of Kamień Pomorski and 69 km (43 mi) north of the regional capital Szczecin.

For the history of the region, see History of Pomerania.

The village has a population of 620.
