= Gmina Kamień Pomorski =

Gmina Kamień Pomorski Kamień Pomorski Commune
- Gmina
- Coat of arms
- Interactive map of Gmina Kamień Pomorski
- Coordinates (Kamień Pomorski): 53°58′11″N 14°47′9″E
- Country: Poland
- Voivodeship: West Pomeranian
- County: Kamień
- Seat: Kamień Pomorski

Area
  - Total: 208.57 km^{2} (80.53 sq mi)

Population (2006)
  - Total: 14,389
  - Density: 68.989/km^{2} (178.68/sq mi)
  - Urban: 9,134
  - Rural: 5,255
- Website: https://www.kamienpomorski.pl/

Gmina Kamień Pomorski is an urban-rural gmina (administrative district) in Kamień County, West Pomeranian Voivodeship, in north-western Poland. Its seat is the town of Kamień Pomorski, which lies approximately 63 kilometres (39 mi) north of the regional capital Szczecin.

The gmina covers an area of 208.57 square kilometres (80.5 sq mi), and as of 2006 its total population is 14,389 (out of which the population of Kamień Pomorski amounts to 9,134, and the population of the rural part of the gmina is 5,255).

== Villages ==
Apart from the town of Kamień Pomorski, Gmina Kamień Pomorski contains the villages and settlements of Benice, Borucin, Buniewice, Buszęcin, Chrząstowo, Chrząszczewo, Ducino, Dusin, Ganiec, Giżkowo, Górki, Grabowo, Grębowo, Jarszewo, Jarzysław, Kukułowo, Miłachowo, Mokrawica, Płastkowo, Połchowo, Radawka, Rarwino, Rekowo, Rozwarowo, Rzewnowo, Sibin, Skarchowo, Śniatowo, Stawno, Strzeżewko, Strzeżewo, Świniec, Szumiąca, Trzebieszewo, Wrzosowo and Żółcino.

== Neighbouring gminas ==
Gmina Kamień Pomorski is bordered by the gminas of Dziwnów, Golczewo, Świerzno and Wolin.
