= Kamień Pomorski =

Town in West Pomeranian Voivodeship, Poland

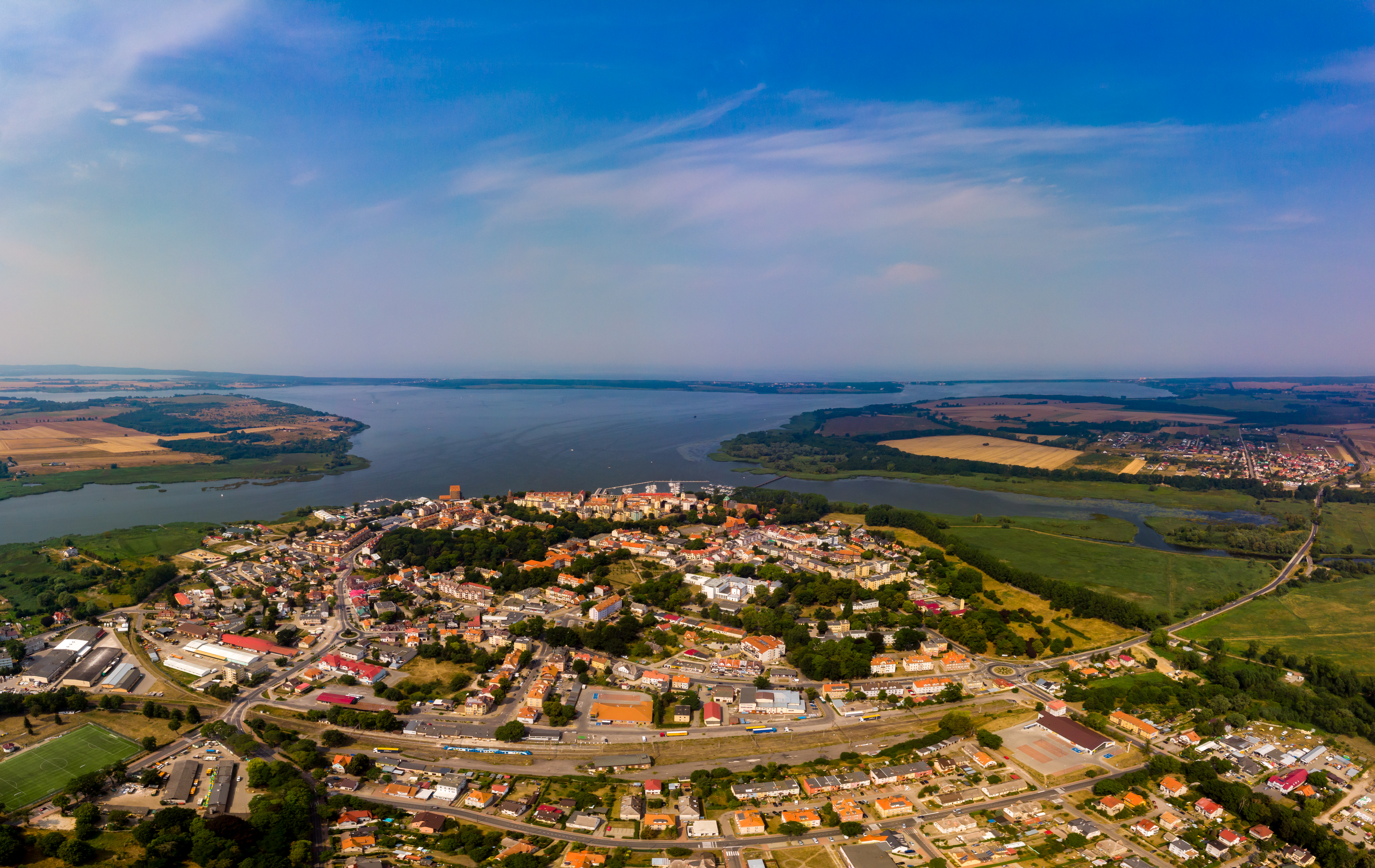
- Aerial view of the town

- Coat of arms

- Location within Poland
- Coordinates: 53°58′12″N 14°46′21″E
- Country: Poland
- Voivodeship: West Pomeranian
- County: Kamień
- Gmina: Kamień Pomorski
- Established: 8th–9th centuries
- First mentioned: 1124
- Town rights: 1274

Government
  - Mayor: Stanisław Kuryłło

Area
  - Total: 10.75 km^{2} (4.15 sq mi)
- Elevation: 10 m (33 ft)

Population (2016)
  - Total: 8,921
  - Density: 829.9/km^{2} (2,149/sq mi)
- Time zone: UTC+1 (CET)
  - Summer (DST): UTC+2 (CEST)
- Postal code: 72-400
- Car plates: ZKA
- Website: www.kamienpomorski.pl

Kamień Pomorski (Polish pronunciation: [ˈkamjɛɲ pɔˈmɔrskʲi]; Kashubian: Kamiéń; German: Cammin or Kammin) is a spa town in the West Pomeranian Voivodeship of north-western Poland, on the Baltic coast. It is the seat of an urban-rural gmina (administrative district) in Kamień County which lies approximately 63 km (39 mi) to the north of the regional capital Szczecin. It is the second seat of the Archdiocese of Szczecin-Kamień and the deanery of Kamień.

In 2015 the town had a population of 8,921 inhabitants.

== Etymology and names ==
The name of the town in English translates as "Pomeranian Stone". It has its origins in the Slavic Lechitic language. The first mentions of the town appeared in the Life of Otto of Bamberg,Civitas ducis Camina by Herbord, Castrum magnum Gamin by Eb, and In urbe Games. Other names are Chamin and Camyna. A bull of 14 October 1140 has the mention of Chamin cum taberna et foro. In a bull of 25 February 1188 there is apud civitated Camyn. Ultimately the name Camin was settled upon.

The name is associated with a massive glacial boulder (diameter of 20 m) situated in the Dziwna riverbed. This Royal Boulder has been used as a designator in ship transport. Since 1959 the Royal Boulder has been protected as a natural monument.

There are three legends dealing with the Royal Boulder.

The first one says that in 1121 Duke Bolesław III Wrymouth stood on it and welcomed sailors' parades.

The second one describes the origins of the Royal Boulder. The boulder was in fact a petrified toad that wreaked havoc in the Kamieński Bay. It was cursed by the Slavic god Trzygłów into a boulder.

The third one describes the story of a devil, banished from a dwelling nearby, that promised to find a suitable partner for a certain giant if it destroys said dwelling. The mistrustful giant wanted to see his future partner first and saw her he did. From the depth of the waters emerged a perfect match for the giant but in the exact moment a rooster crowed, the illusion of the future spouse was dropped and showed a devil. A furious giant threw into him a massive boulder. Devil wanted to run away and changed into a toad, but it was too late, the boulder crushed him and confines him to this day.

== History ==
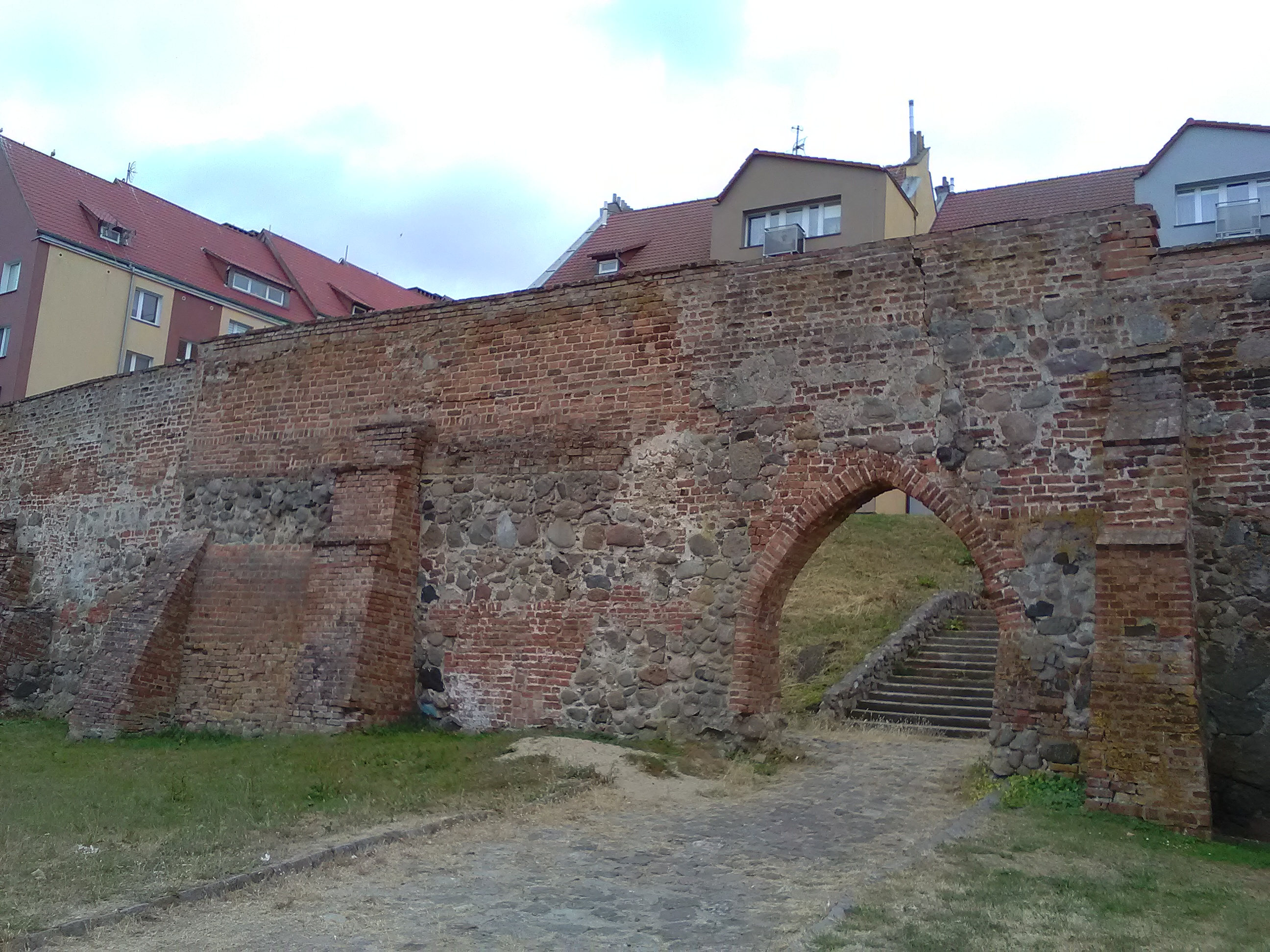
Medieval town walls

Kamień was founded at the turn of the 8th and 9th centuries by the Lechitic Wolinians tribe, and became part of Poland soon after the creation of the state under its first ruler Mieszko I around 967. A defensive stronghold was probably built in the 10th century. The town was first mentioned in documents in 1124. As a result of the 12th-century fragmentation of Poland, it became part of the separate Duchy of Pomerania. The town became the first known capital of the Duchy of Pomerania and, in 1176, the seat of a bishopric. In 1180 a mint was established in Kamień. From time to time, the Dukes of Pomerania would also reside in the town. By 1228 the Dominicans were involved in the town's religious affairs, and in 1274 it received Lübeck city rights.

Sweden acquired control of the town at the Peace of Westphalia ending the Thirty Years' War in 1648, which however stayed part of the Holy Roman Empire. Acquired by Brandenburg-Prussia in 1679, the town was made part of the Kingdom of Prussia in 1701. It was administered as part of the Prussian Province of Pomerania. During World War II, the Germans operated a forced labour subcamp of the Stalag II-D prisoner-of-war camp in the town. In 1945, the town became again part of Poland under border changes agreed upon at the Potsdam Conference.

A hoard of early medieval jewellery was discovered during archaeological excavations in Kamień Pomorski in 1959–1961.

== Geography ==
=== Location ===
Kamień Pomorski is located on in the pool of Dziwna's strait that creates Kamieński Bay. The town lies by the two bays: Karpinka and Promna, approximately 90 km (56 mi) to Szczecin. Kamień Pomorski lies in the north-west part of the West Pomeranian Voivodeship. The centre of the city is located about 7 km (4 mi) to the Baltic Sea, to which it has direct access.

=== Climate ===
Moderately warm, oceanic climate (Cfb in the Köppen climate classification) This climate is dominated all year round by the polar front, leading to changeable, often overcast weather. Summers are cool due to cool ocean currents, but winters are milder than other climates in similar latitudes, but usually very cloudy. Average temperature changes between 7-8,3 °C. August is the warmest month in the year, and January – the coldest. Max temperature is between 32,1 – 33,1 °C, and min. temperature is between -18,6- -19,2 °C. Annual precipitation rate ranges from 550 mm to 650 mm. Length of growing period is 210–220 days. Winds blow mostly from the South-West and North-West direction.

== Tourism ==
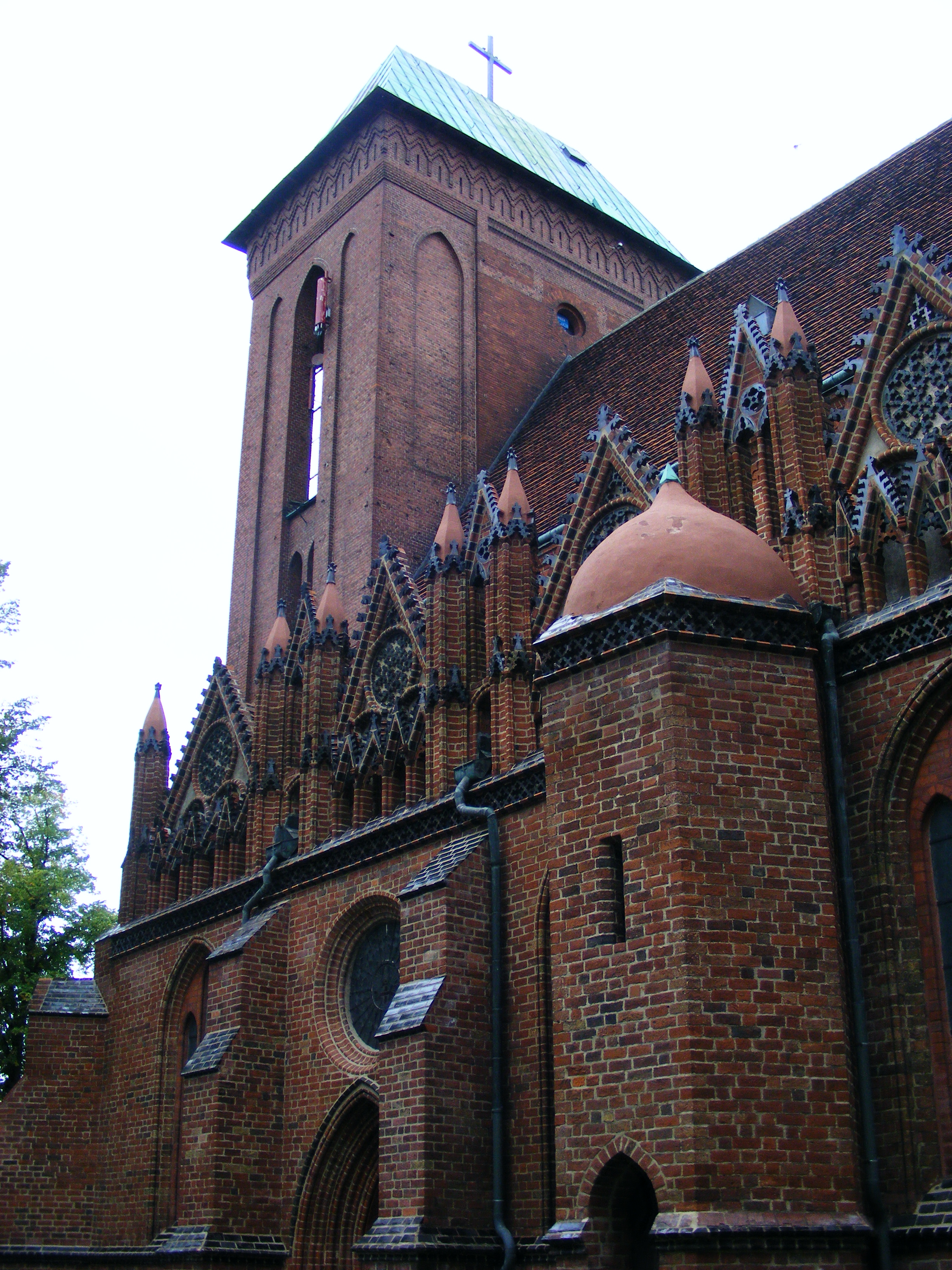
Cathedral of St. John the Baptist

The town is close to Zalew Kamieński (Kamieński Bay). The Cathedral of St. John the Baptist (Polish: Katedra św. Jana Chrzciciela) is a local landmark. The cathedral is one of Poland's official national Historic Monuments (Pomnik historii), as designated September 1, 2005 and tracked by the National Heritage Board of Poland.

== International relations ==
Kamień Pomorski is twinned with:

Bromölla, Sweden; Grimmen, Germany	Kowary, Poland; Lünen, Germany	Porvoo, Finland; Torgelow, Germany

== Notable residents ==
- Jaromar (c. 1267 – c. 1294) selected as Bishop of Cammin
- Ewald Georg von Kleist (1700–1748), German jurist, Lutheran cleric, physicist and the inventor of the Leyden jar
- Adolphus Asher (1800–1853), German bookseller, publisher, bibliographer and Anglophile
- Klaus Uebe (1900–1968), German Luftwaffe General
- Klausjürgen Wussow (1929–2007) a German stage, film and television actor
- Uwe Johnson (1934–1984) a German writer, editor and scholar
- Bogusław Mamiński (born 1955) a retired long-distance runner
- Adrian Benedyczak (born 2000) a Polish professional football player

== Gallery ==
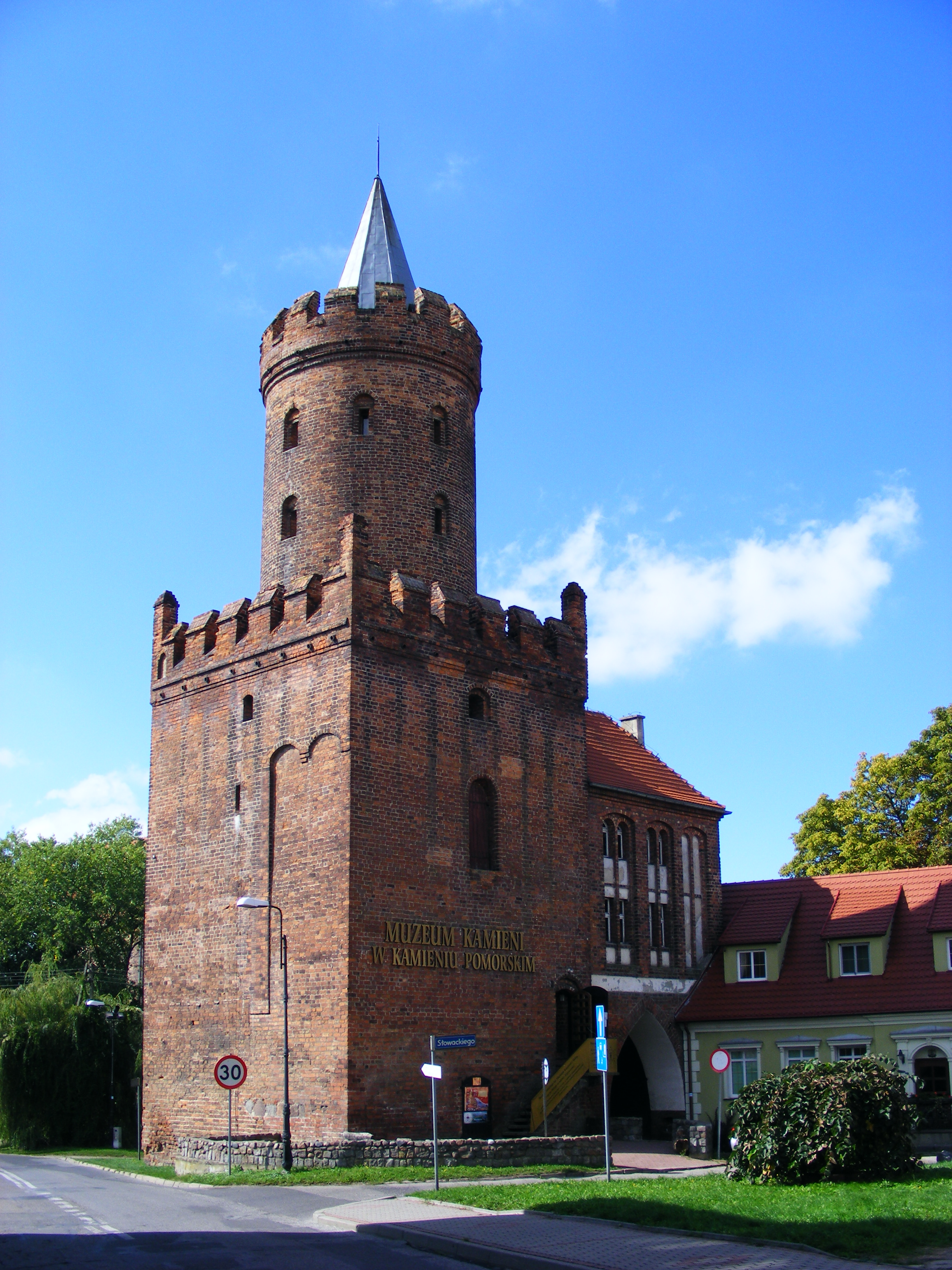
Piast Tower (now a museum)

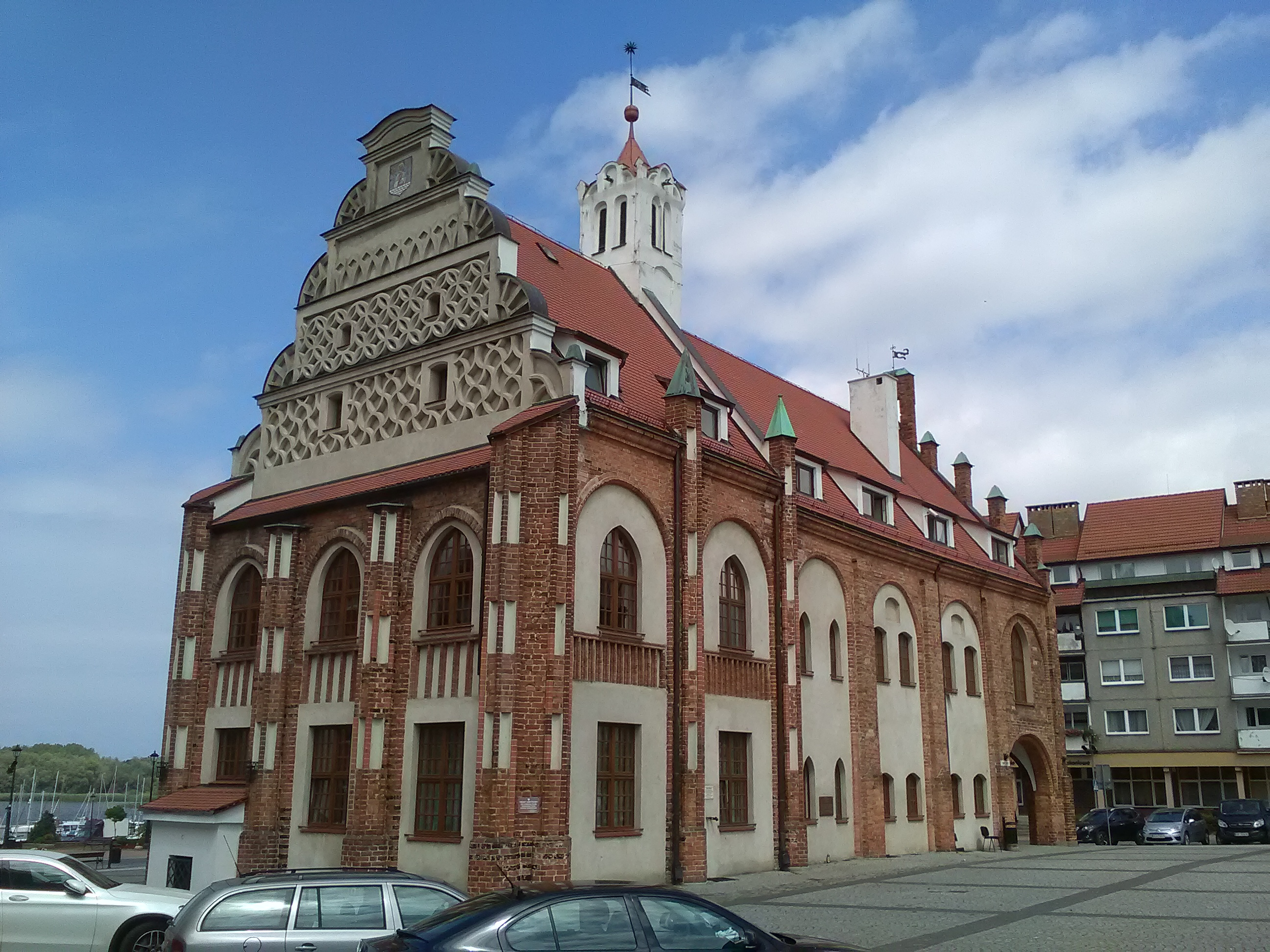
Town hall (c. 1350)

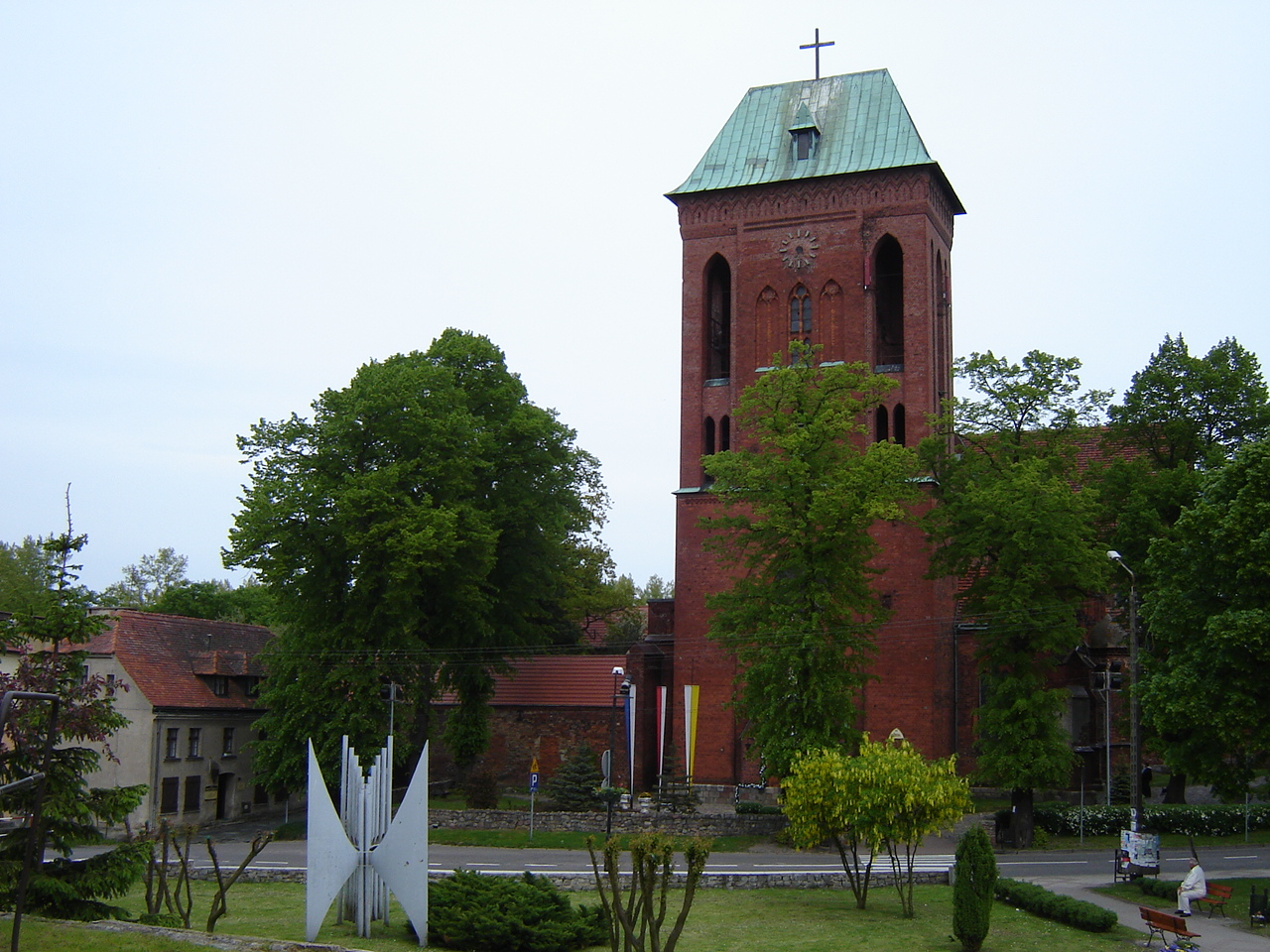
Cathedral of St. John the Baptist

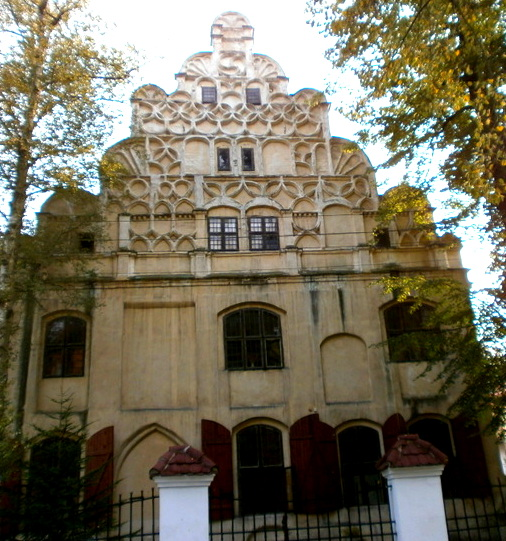
Bishop's palace

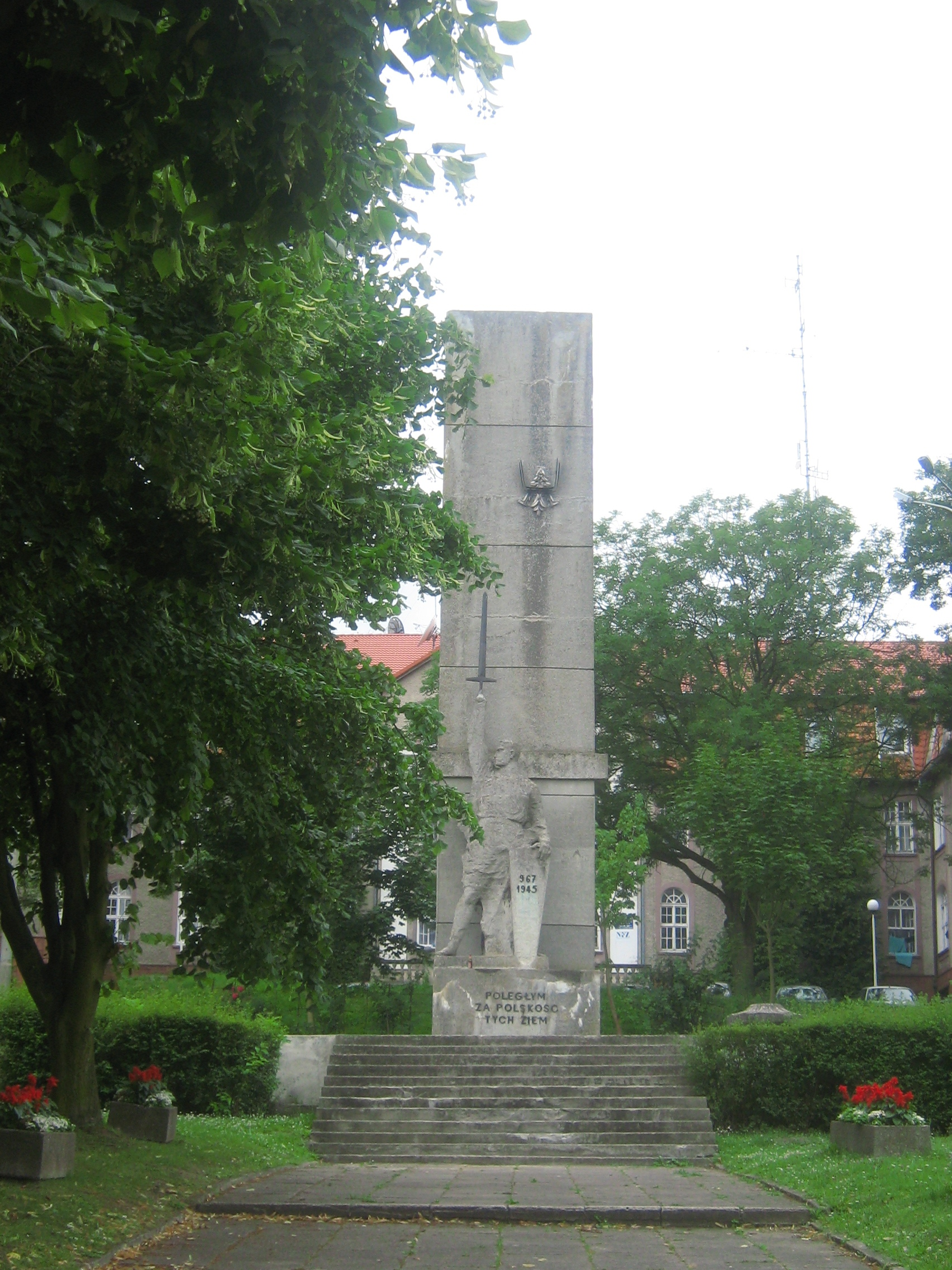
A post-war monument

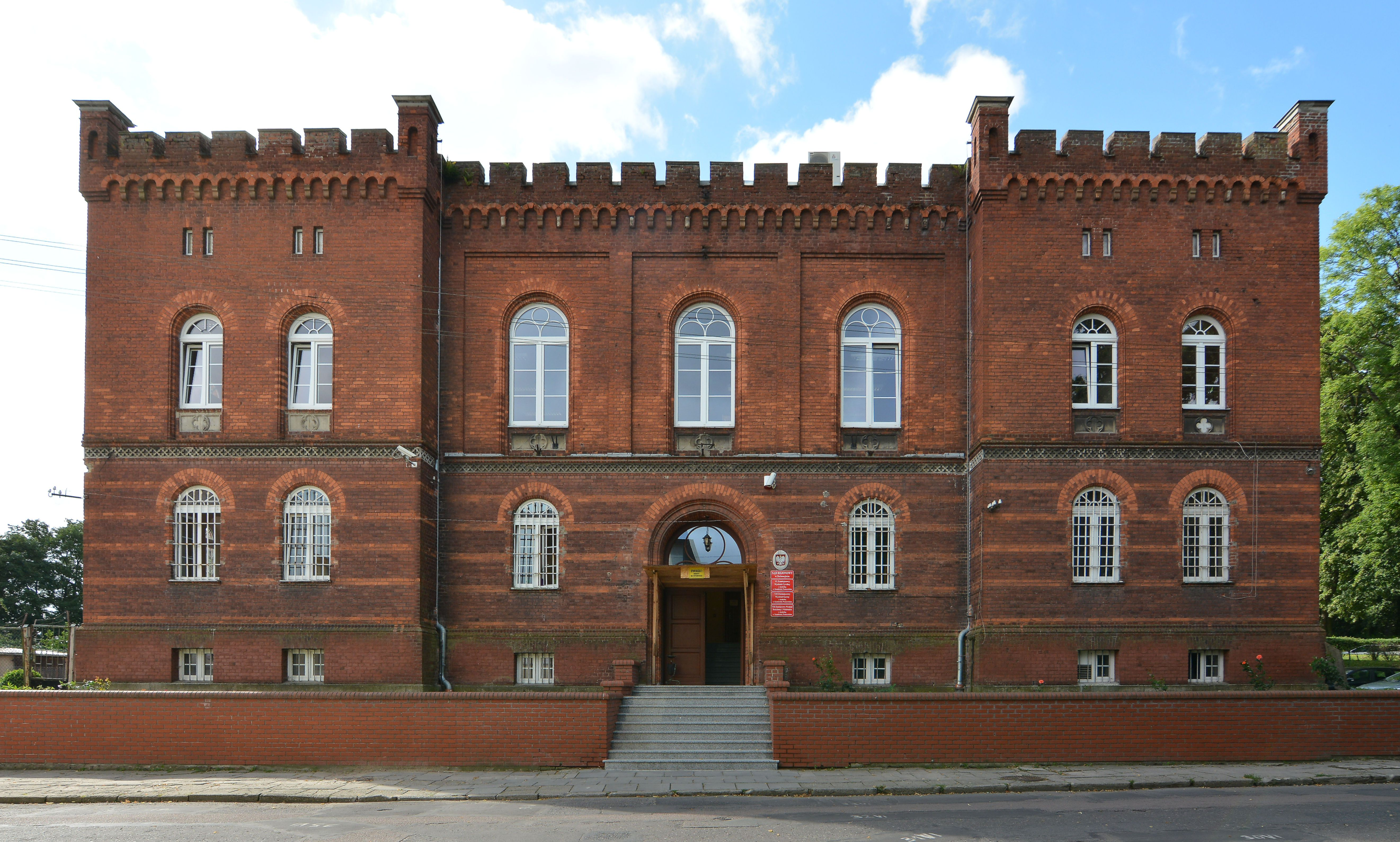
Courthouse

== See also ==
- Bishopric of Cammin
- Kamień Pomorski homeless hostel fire
