= Niemica (river) =

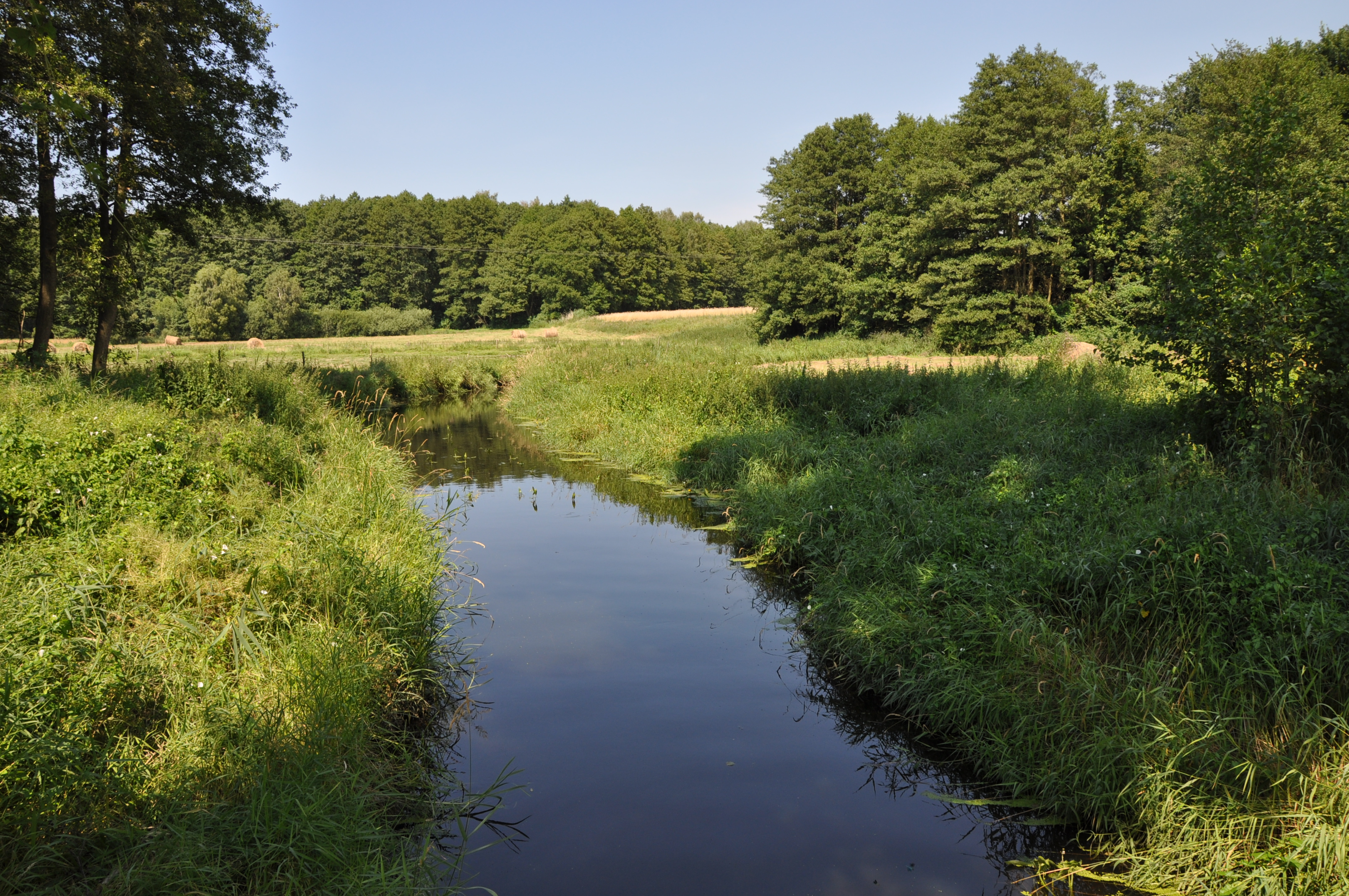
- The Niemica near Mokrawica

- The location of the Niemica (specifically, its mouth) on a map of Poland

Location
- Country: Poland
- Voivodeship: West Pomeranian Voivodeship
- Powiat: Kamień County
- Villages: Szumiąca, Mokrawica

Physical characteristics
- Source
  - location: South of Lake Żabie in the West Pomeranian Voivodeship, near Szczecin
  - coordinates: 53°49′30″N 15°01′20″E
- Mouth
  - location: the Świniec River; north of Borucin and east of Grabowo
  - coordinates: 53°58′25″N 14°49′09″E
- Length: 27 km (17 mi)
- Basin size: 112.6 km^{2} (43.5 mi^{2})

Basin features
- Progression: Świniec→ Dziwna→ Baltic Sea

The Niemica [ɲɛˈmit͡sa] is a river in north-western Poland and a tributary of the Świniec River. It is 27 kilometres (17 mi) long, and has a basin size of 112.6 square kilometres (43.5 sq mi). Its source is located south of Lake Żabie (though that lake is located in a different river basin), by the No. 420 railway line.

Initially, the river flows in a south-westerly direction to Lake Szczucze, at which it flows into the fishponds adjacent to the lake's south-eastern shore. It leaves the lake at its northern shore, and after about 250 metres (820 ft) it enters Lake Okonie. Next, it flows from the north-western shore of Lake Okonie and flows in a north-westerly direction to the east of the village Niemica, then travelling further north through the village of Szumiąca and afterwards continuing in a north-westerly direction, where it passes through the village of Mokrawica. Flowing in its final section along the Trzebiatowski Coast, it flows into the Świniec River to the east of the village of Grabowo, near Kamień Pomorski. The Świniec carries on moving to the west, where it meets the Kamieński Lagoon, part of the Dziwna.

The name Niemica has been used officially since 1948, replacing the river's earlier German name of Niemitz Bach (the whole area became again part of Poland in 1945, as part of the territorial changes of Poland immediately after World War II, and in the prior centuries it was at various times under Polish, Danish, Prussian and German rule).

In 1958, a Bronze-Age (or possibly early Iron-Age) settlement was discovered on the river's right bank, by the road to the village of Benice. It was part of the Lusatian culture.

The species of fish that are most common in the river are the common roach and the European perch. However, many other species are also found in it, namely the tench, the northern pike, the burbot, the common bleak, the common rudd, the silver bream (also known as the white bream) and the gudgeon.

In 2008, a study of the water quality of the Niemica was carried out at its mouth by the Provincial Inspectorate of Environmental Protection (WIOŚ) of Szczecin. The physical and chemical properties of the water were not deemed good and the ecological state of the river was deemed moderate; however, the amount of particularly dangerous substances in the water was good biological properties of the water were described as first-class. In the overall two-stage score, the water quality of the Niemica was deemed to be poor.

Water flows into the river from the mechano-biological sewage treatment plant located in Kamień Pomorski. The river can receive up to 8057m^{3} of it in a twenty-four-hour period.

== Gallery ==
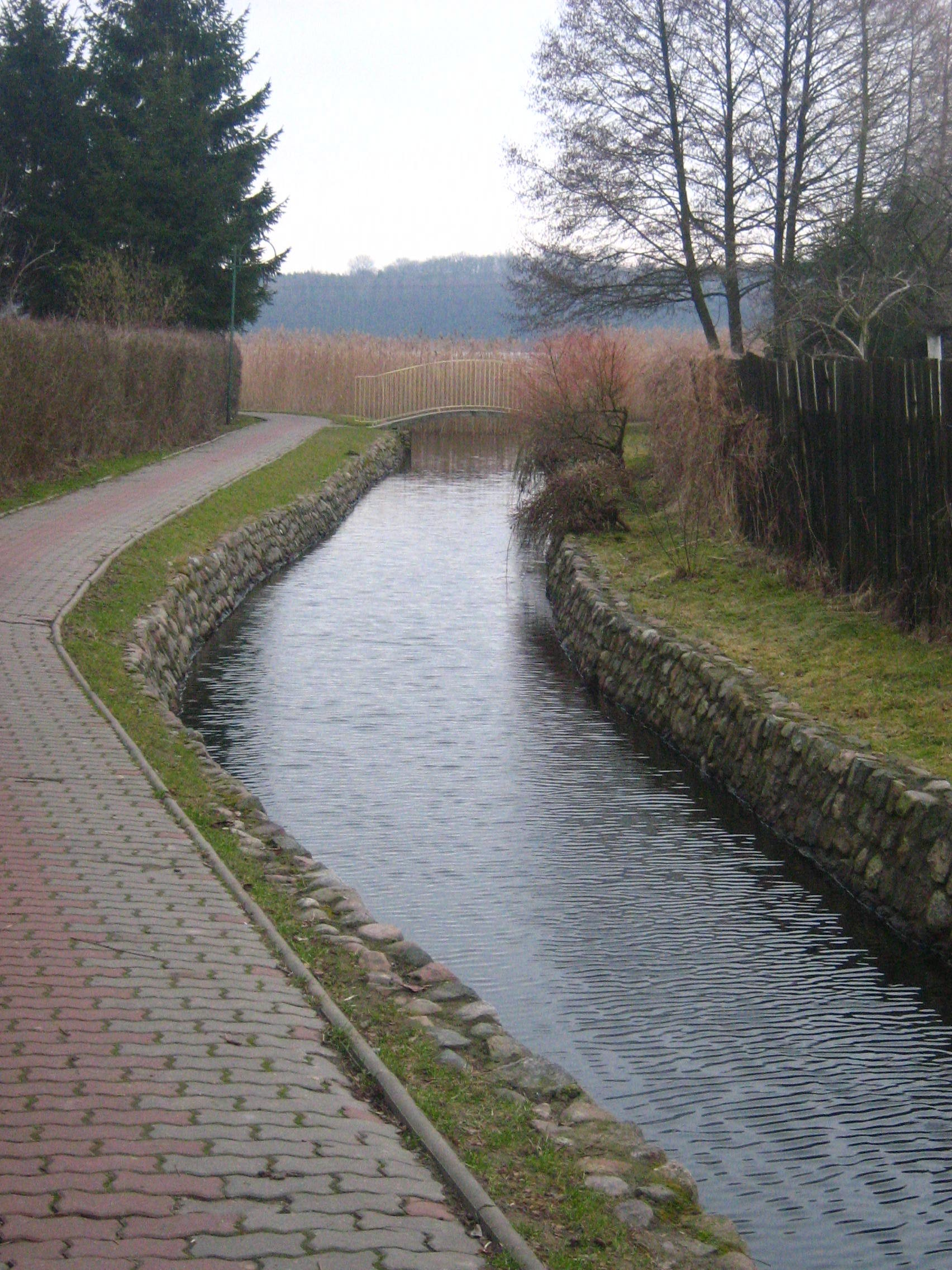
The Niemica River passing through Golczewo, close to Lake Szczuce.

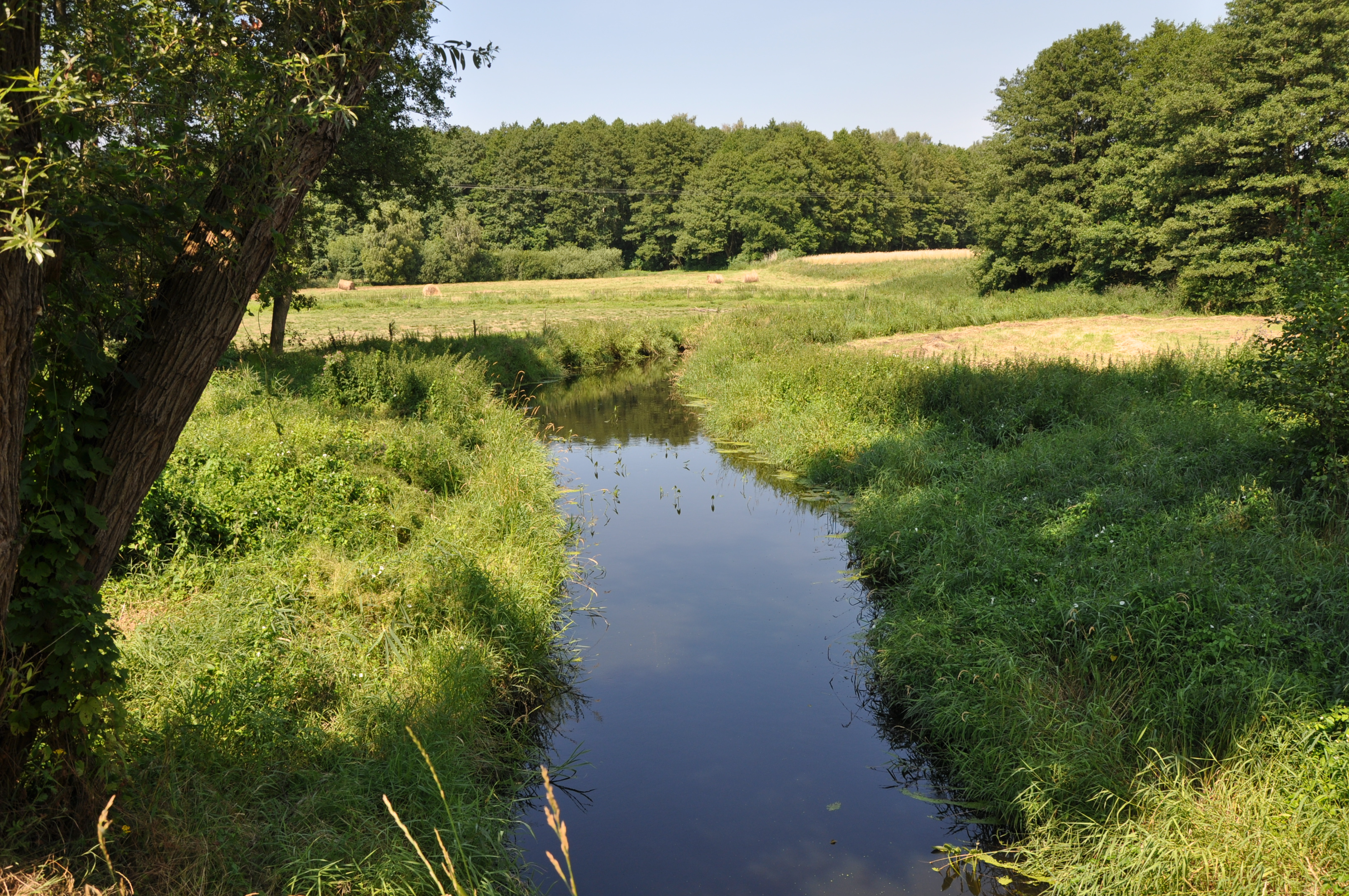
A photograph of the Niemica River taken from the bridge in Mokrawica.

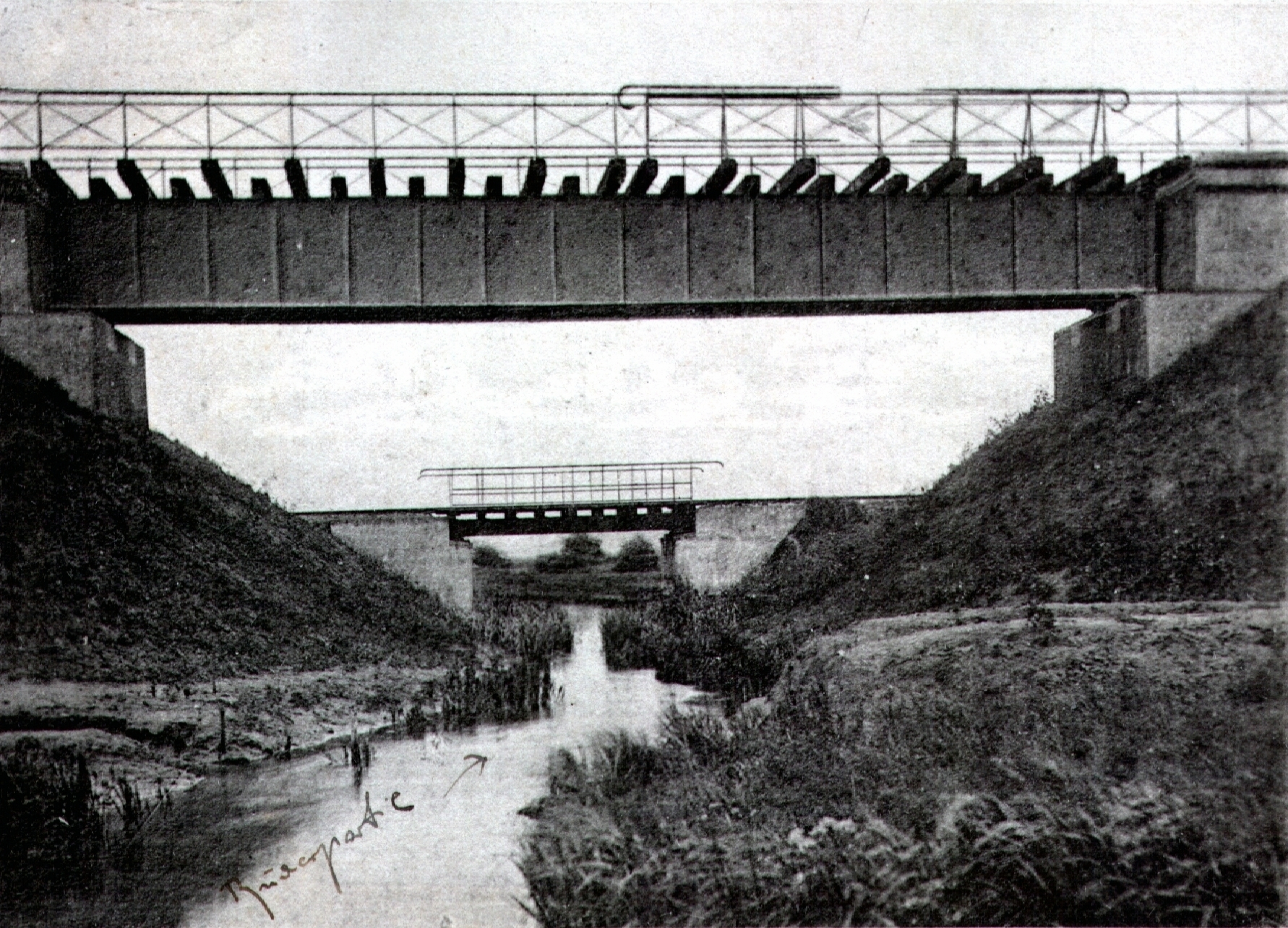
A historical picture of the Niemica River, taken before 1945.

== See also ==
- List of rivers of Poland
- Niemica, Kamień County
