= Voivodeship road 108 =

Road in Poland

Voivodeship Road 108
- Droga wojewódzka nr 108

Route information
- Maintained by Zachodnio Pomorski Zarząd Dróg Wojewódzkich
- Length: 39 km (24 mi)

Major junctions
- From: Parłówko
- To: Płoty

Location
- Country: Poland
- Regions: West Pomeranian Voivodeship

Highway system
- National roads in Poland; Voivodeship roads
← DW 107	→ DW 109

Voivodeship road 108 (Polish: Droga wojewódzka nr 108, abbreviated DW 108) is a route in the Polish voivodeship roads network. The route runs through two powiats: Kamień County(Gmina Wolin and Gmina Golczewo and Gryfice County (Gmina Płoty).

== Important settlements along the route ==
- Parłówko
- Strzegowo
- Wysoka Kamieńska
- Baczysław
- Kretlewo
- Gadom
- Golczewo
- Unibórz
- Truskolas
- Płoty

== Route plan ==
km	Icon	Name	Crossed roads
x		Świnoujście	—
x		Szklarska Poręba	—
0		Parłówko	
0		Roundabout in Parłówko	
6		Wysoka Kamieńska	—
6		Level crossing for the Railway Line 401	—
10		Kretlewo	—
12		Level crossing for the Railway Line 420	—
18		Roundabout in Golczewo	
21		Roundabout in Golczewo	
39		Viaduct over the Railway Line 420	—
39		Level crossing for the Railway Line 402	—
39		Płoty	
x		Mrzeżyno	—
