= Chrząszczewo Island =

Island in West Pomeranian Voivodeship, Poland

Coordinates: 53.9628°N 14.7272°E

Chrząszczewo
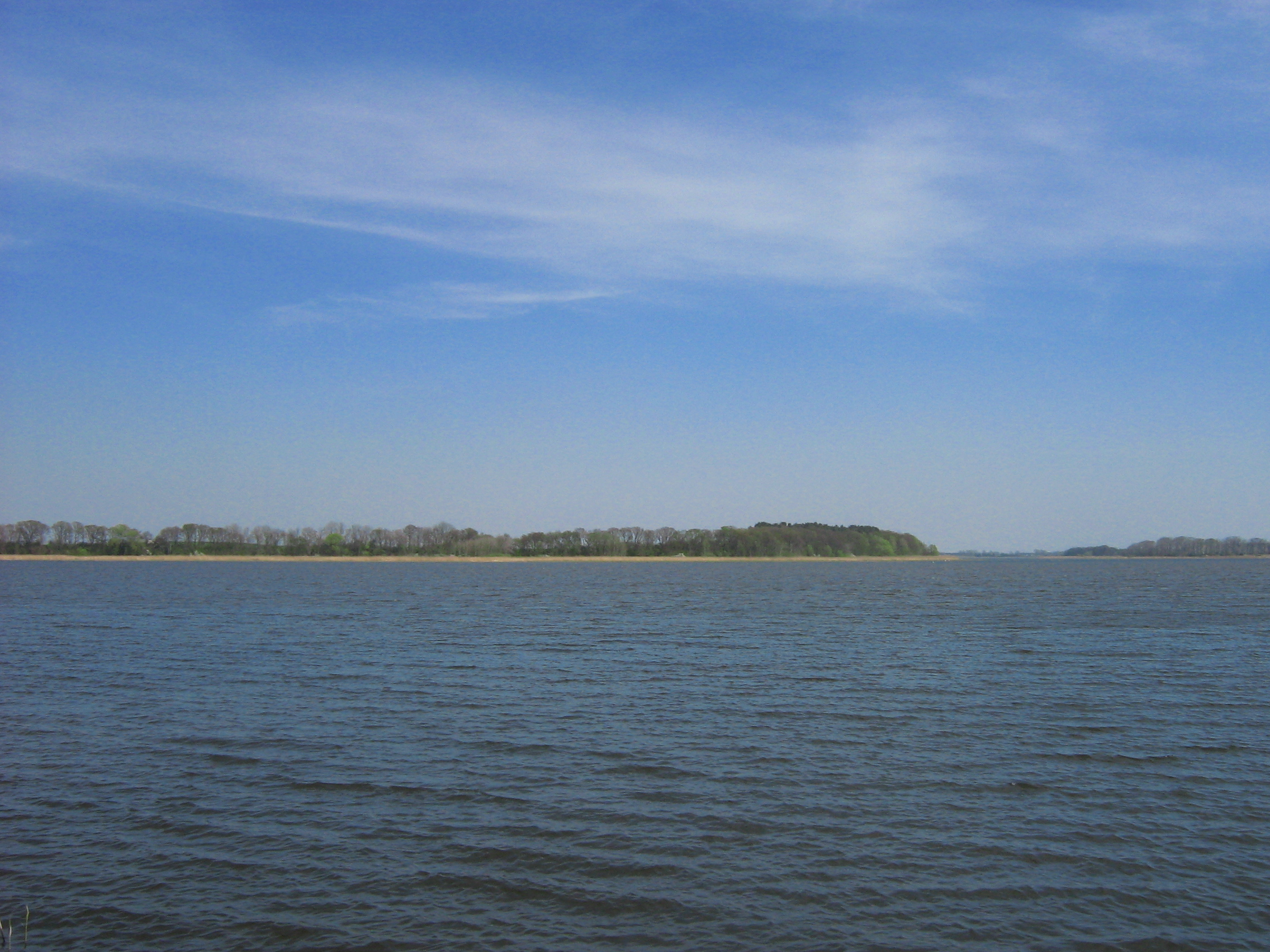
- Chrząszczewo Island seen from the village of Sierosław

Geography
- Location: Kamień Lagoon
- Area: 10 km^{2} (3.9 sq mi)

Chrząszczewo Island (Polish: Wyspa Chrząszczewska) is an island in West Pomeranian Voivodeship, north-western Poland, with an area of 10 square kilometres (3.9 sq mi). It is located in Kamieński Lagoon, in Kamień County, linked with the mainland by bridge around the town of Kamień Pomorski. The island is limited by Kamieński Lagoon to the north, Promna Bay to the east, Cicha Bay to the south and the river of Dziwna to the west and south-west.

There are three villages on Chrząszczewska Island: Chrząszczewo, Chrząszczewko and Buniewice. In the western part of the island, there is a hill called Wyżawa (26.6 metres tall).

In the area located to the north from the village of Chrząszczewo, there is a megalithic burial mound and oil wells.

During World War II, German rocket launchers were stationed on the island.

The area of the island is covered by a special bird protection area "Zalew Kamieński i Dziwna" and a special habitat protection area "Ujście Odry and Zalew Szczeciński".

Until 1945, a German name of "Insel Gristow" was in use. In 1949, the Polish name of Wyspa Chrząszczewska was established (wyspa means island in Polish). Until 1956, Chrząszczewska Island was part of the town of Kamień Pomorski. On 31 December 1959 the island was excluded from the town's area.
