= List of rivers of Poland =

Following is a list of rivers, which are at least partially, if not predominantly located within Poland.

== Rivers by length ==
For list of rivers in alphabetical order, please use table-sort buttons.

28 longest rivers in Poland
River name	Emptying into	Total length		Length in Poland		Total basin area		Basin area in Poland	
River name	Emptying into	km	mi	km	mi	km^{2}	sq mi	km^{2}	sq mi
Vistula	Baltic Sea	1,022	635	1,022	635	193,690	74,780	168,868	65,200
Oder	Baltic Sea	840	520	726	451	119,074	45,975	106,043	40,943
Warta	Oder	795	494	795	494	54,520	21,050	54,520	21,050
Bug	Narew	774	481	590	370	38,712	14,947	19,239	7,428
Narew	Vistula	499	310	443	275	74,527	28,775	53,846	20,790
San	Vistula	458	285	457	284	16,877	6,516	14,426	5,570
Noteć	Warta	391	243	391	243	17,302	6,680	17,302	6,680
Wieprz	Vistula	349	217	349	217	10,497	4,053	10,497	4,053
Pilica	Vistula	333	207	333	207	9,258	3,575	9,258	3,575
Bóbr	Oder	279	173	276	171	5,874	2,268	5,830	2,250
Łyna	Pregolya	264	164	207	129	7,126	2,751	5,298	2,046
Wkra	Narew	255	158	255	158	5,348	2,065	5,348	2,065
Dunajec	Vistula	249	155	249	155	6,796	2,624	4,838	1,868
Nysa Łużycka	Oder	246	153	197	122	4,403	1,700	2,201	850
Brda	Vistula	245	152	245	152	4,665	1,801	4,665	1,801
Drwęca	Vistula	231	144	231	144	5,697	2,200	5,697	2,200
Prosna	Warta	227	141	227	141	4,917	1,898	4,917	1,898
Wisłok	San	220	140	220	140	3,538	1,366	3,538	1,366
Wda (Czarna Woda)	Vistula	198	123	198	123	2,325	898	2,325	898
Drawa	Noteć	192	119	192	119	3,291	1,271	3,291	1,271
Nysa Kłodzka	Oder	189	117	189	117	4,570	1,760	3,742	1,445
Rega	Baltic Sea	188	117	188	117	2,767	1,068	2,767	1,068
Bzura	Vistula	173	107	173	107	7,764	2,998	7,764	2,998
Wisłoka	Vistula	173	107	173	107	4,100	1,600	4,100	1,600
Obra	Warta	171	106	171	106	2,760	1,070	2,760	1,070
Pasłęka	Vistula Lagoon, Baltic Sea	169	105	169	105	2,294	886	2,294	886
Biebrza	Narew	164	102	164	102	7,092	2,738	7,067	2,729
Nida	Vistula	154	96	154	96	3,844	1,484	3,844	1,484

== River system ==
Baltic Sea

- Odra
  - Warta
    - Ner
    - Noteć
      - Drawa
    - Obra
    - Prosna
    - Widawka
  - Nysa Łużycka
  - Bóbr
  - Cegielinka
    - Diabelnica
  - Nysa Kłodzka
  - Świniec
    - Niemica
    - Wołcza
    - Stuchowska Struga
- Rega
- Parsęta
- Wieprza
- Słupia
- Łeba
- Reda
- Pasłęka

Baltic Sea

- Vistula (Wisła)
  - Wda
  - Brda
  - Drwęca
  - Bzura
  - Narew
    - Wkra
    - Bug
    - Biebrza
  - Pilica
  - Wieprz
  - San
    - Złota
    - Wisłok
  - Wisłoka
  - Nida
  - Dunajec
    - Poprad

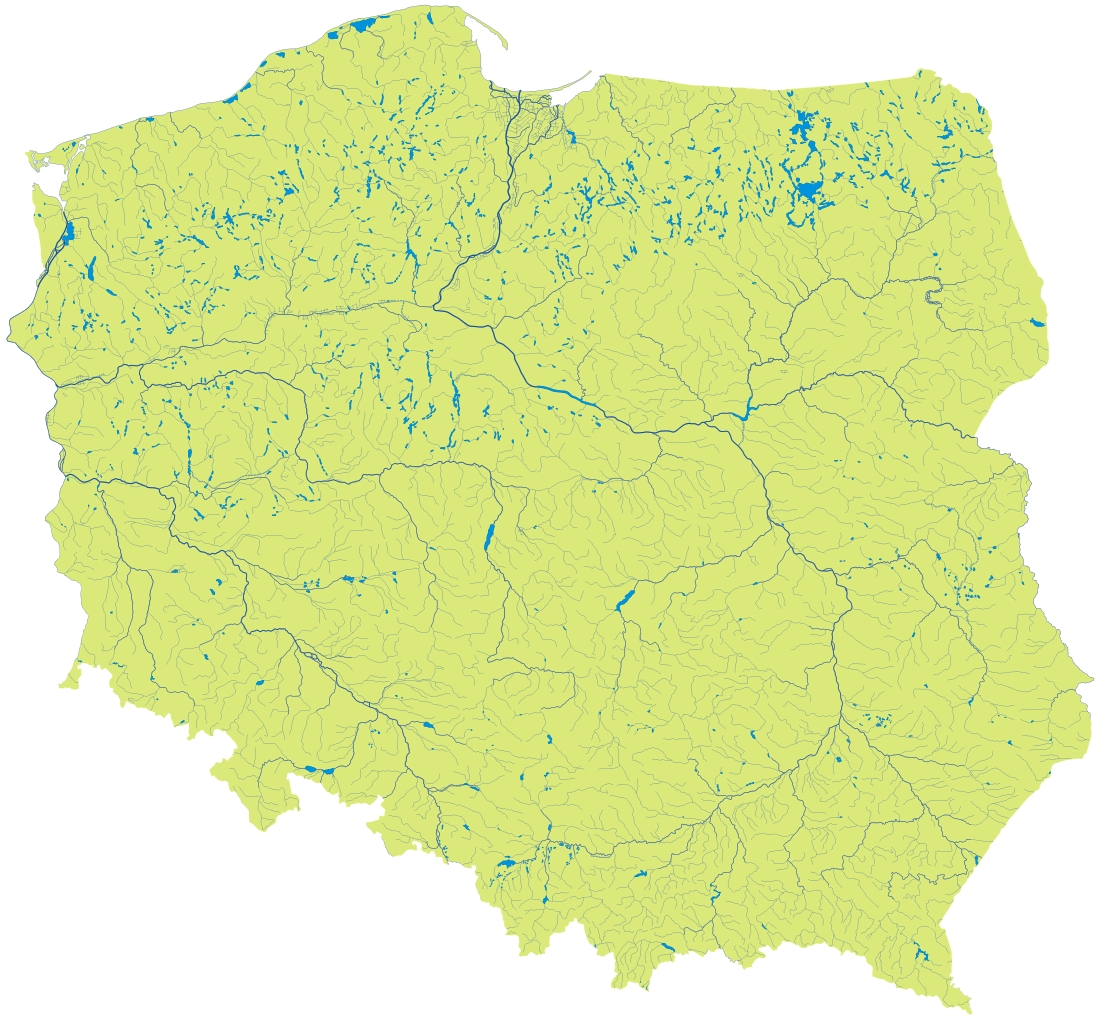
Hydrography of Poland

== See also ==
- Geography of Poland
