= Imno, Kamień County =

Imno
- Village
- Location within Poland
- Coordinates: 53°47′38″N 15°4′36″E
- Country: Poland
- Voivodeship: West Pomeranian
- County: Kamień
- Gmina: Golczewo

Imno [ˈimnɔ] (German: Immenhof) is a village in the administrative district of Gmina Golczewo, within Kamień County, West Pomeranian Voivodeship, in north-western Poland. It lies approximately 8 km (5 mi) south-east of Golczewo, 28 km (17 mi) south-east of Kamień Pomorski, and 54 km (34 mi) north-east of the regional capital Szczecin.

Imno is the seat of the Polish Shetland Pony Society.

== See also ==
- History of Pomerania
