= Koplino =

- Village
- Location within Poland
- Coordinates: 53°51′N 14°53′E
- Country: Poland
- Voivodeship: West Pomeranian
- County: Kamień
- Gmina: Golczewo
- Population: 100

Koplino [kɔˈplinɔ] (German: Kopplin) is a village in the administrative district of Gmina Golczewo, within Kamień County, West Pomeranian Voivodeship, in north-western Poland. It lies approximately 7 km (4 mi) west of Golczewo, 15 km (9 mi) south-east of Kamień Pomorski, and 52 km (32 mi) north of the regional capital Szczecin.

For the history of the region, see History of Pomerania.

The village has a population of 100.
