= Parłówko =

- Settlement
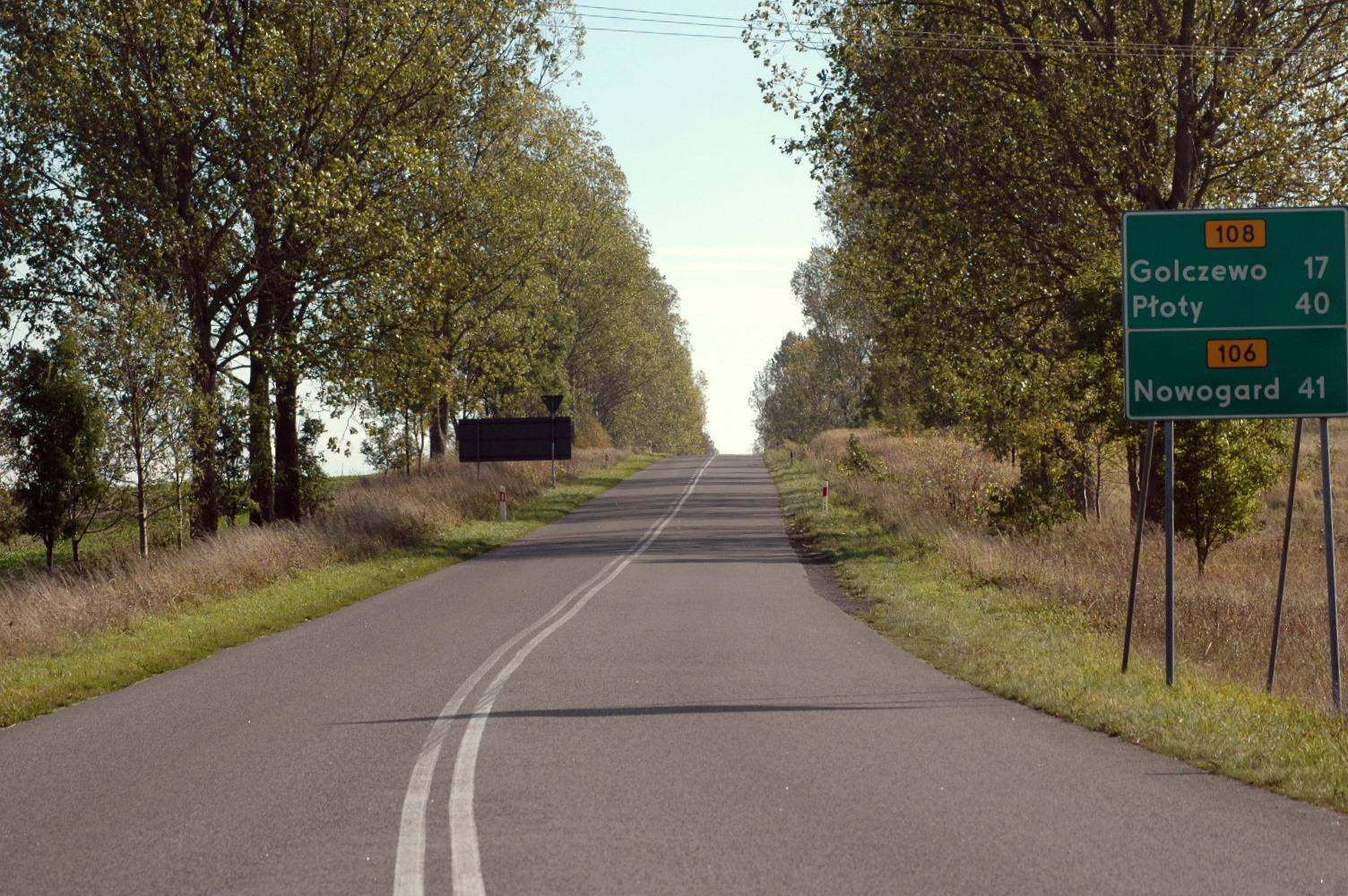
- Beginning of the voivodeship road 108, located in Parłówko, in 2009.

- Location within Poland
- Coordinates: 53°50′43″N 14°44′54″E
- Country: Poland
- Voivodeship: West Pomeranian
- County: Kamień
- Gmina: Wolin
- Time zone: UTC+1 (CET)
  - Summer (DST): UTC+2 (CEST)
- Postal code: 72-511
- Area code: +48 91

Parłówko (Polish: [parˈwuf.kɔ], from 1945 to 1947: Parłowo [parˈwɔ.vɔ]; German until 1945: Parlowkrug [paʁˈlɔf.kruːk]) is a settlement in the West Pomeranian Voivodeship, Poland, located within the Gmina Wolin, Kamień County.

== Transportation ==
In the settlement is located the Parłówko railway stop, located on the railway line 401, between stations of Szczecin Dąbie and Świnoujście Port. In Parłówko is also located the intersection between the voivodeship road 107, and voivodeship road 108.
