= Barnisławice =

- Village
- Location within Poland
- Coordinates: 53°47′46″N 15°1′23″E
- Country: Poland
- Voivodeship: West Pomeranian
- County: Kamień
- Gmina: Golczewo

Barnisławice [barniswaˈvit͡sɛ] (German: Balbitzow) is a village in the administrative district of Gmina Golczewo, within Kamień County, West Pomeranian Voivodeship, in north-western Poland. It lies approximately 5 km (3 mi) south-east of Golczewo, 25 km (16 mi) south-east of Kamień Pomorski, and 52 km (32 mi) north-east of the regional capital Szczecin.

== See also ==
- History of Pomerania
