= Kłodzino =

Kłodzino may refer to the following places:

- Kłodzino, Kamień County in West Pomeranian Voivodeship (north-west Poland)
- Kłodzino, Pyrzyce County in West Pomeranian Voivodeship (north-west Poland)
- Kłodzino, Szczecinek County in West Pomeranian Voivodeship (north-west Poland)
- Kłodzino, Świdwin County in West Pomeranian Voivodeship (north-west Poland)
