= Mechowo, Kamień County =

Mechowo
- Village
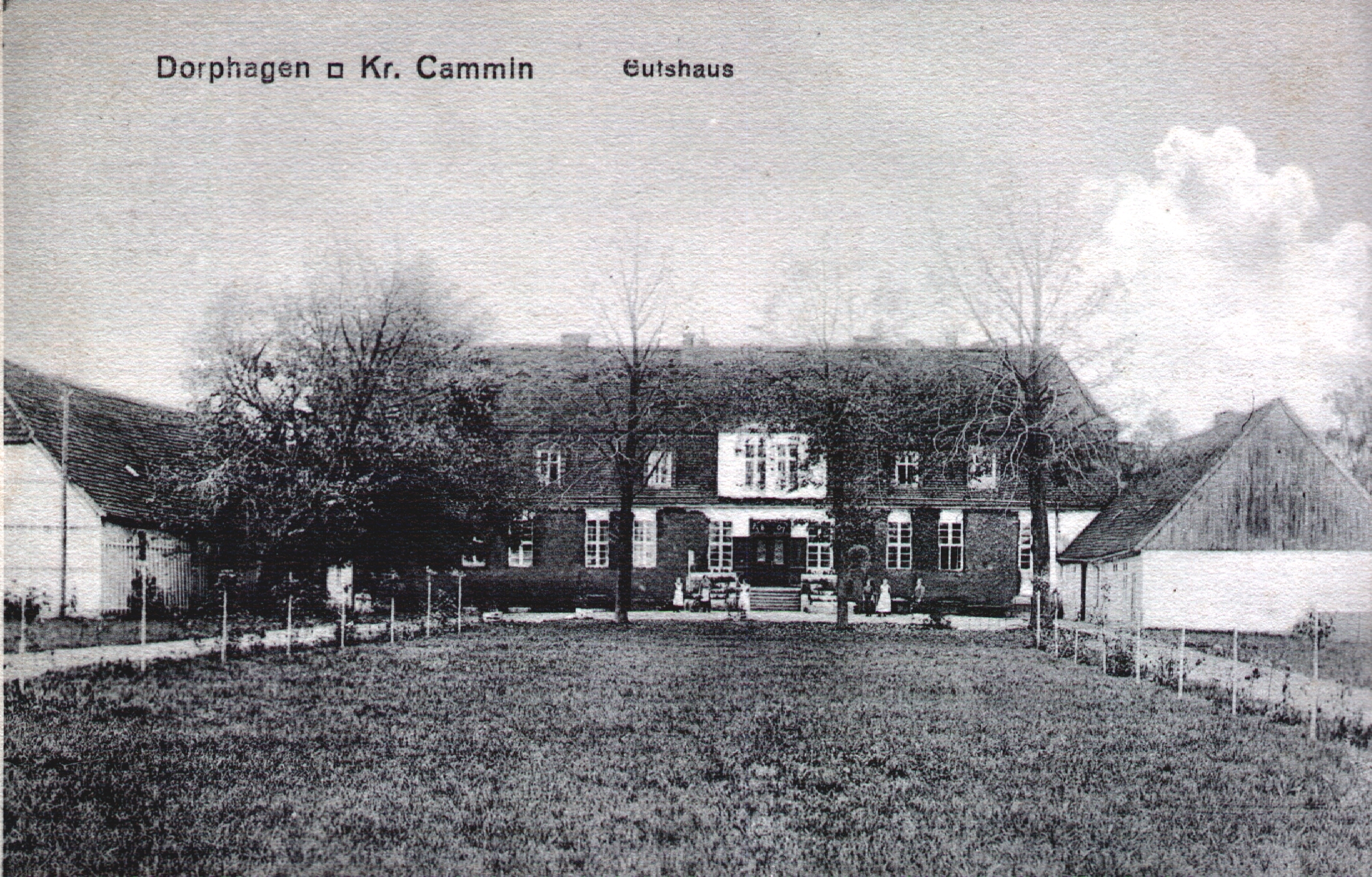
- Manor house in 1926

- Location within Poland
- Coordinates: 53°53′47″N 15°1′23″E
- Country: Poland
- Voivodeship: West Pomeranian
- County: Kamień
- Gmina: Golczewo

Mechowo [mɛˈxɔvɔ] (German: Dorphagen) is a village in the administrative district of Gmina Golczewo, within Kamień County, West Pomeranian Voivodeship, in north-western Poland. It lies approximately 9 km (6 mi) north of Golczewo, 18 km (11 mi) south-east of Kamień Pomorski, and 61 km (38 mi) north-east of the regional capital Szczecin.
