= Drzewica, West Pomeranian Voivodeship =

Drzewica
- Village
- Location within Poland
- Coordinates: 53°47′N 14°58′E
- Country: Poland
- Voivodeship: West Pomeranian
- County: Kamień
- Gmina: Golczewo

Drzewica [dʐɛˈvit͡sa] (German: Drewitz) is a village in the administrative district of Gmina Golczewo, within Kamień County, West Pomeranian Voivodeship, in north-western Poland. It lies approximately 5 km (3 mi) south of Golczewo, 24 km (15 mi) south-east of Kamień Pomorski, and 48 km (30 mi) north-east of the regional capital Szczecin.

== See also ==
- History of Pomerania
