= Upadły =

- Village
- Location within Poland
- Coordinates: 53°51′N 15°0′E
- Country: Poland
- Voivodeship: West Pomeranian
- County: Kamień
- Gmina: Golczewo
- Population: 200

Upadły [uˈpadwɨ] (German Henkenhagen) is a village in the administrative district of Gmina Golczewo, within Kamień County, West Pomeranian Voivodeship, in north-western Poland. It lies approximately 3 km (2 mi) north-east of Golczewo, 20 km (12 mi) south-east of Kamień Pomorski, and 56 km (35 mi) north-east of the regional capital Szczecin.

The village has a population of 200.
