= Kamień Lagoon =

Body of water in Poland

- Zalew Kamieński (Polish)
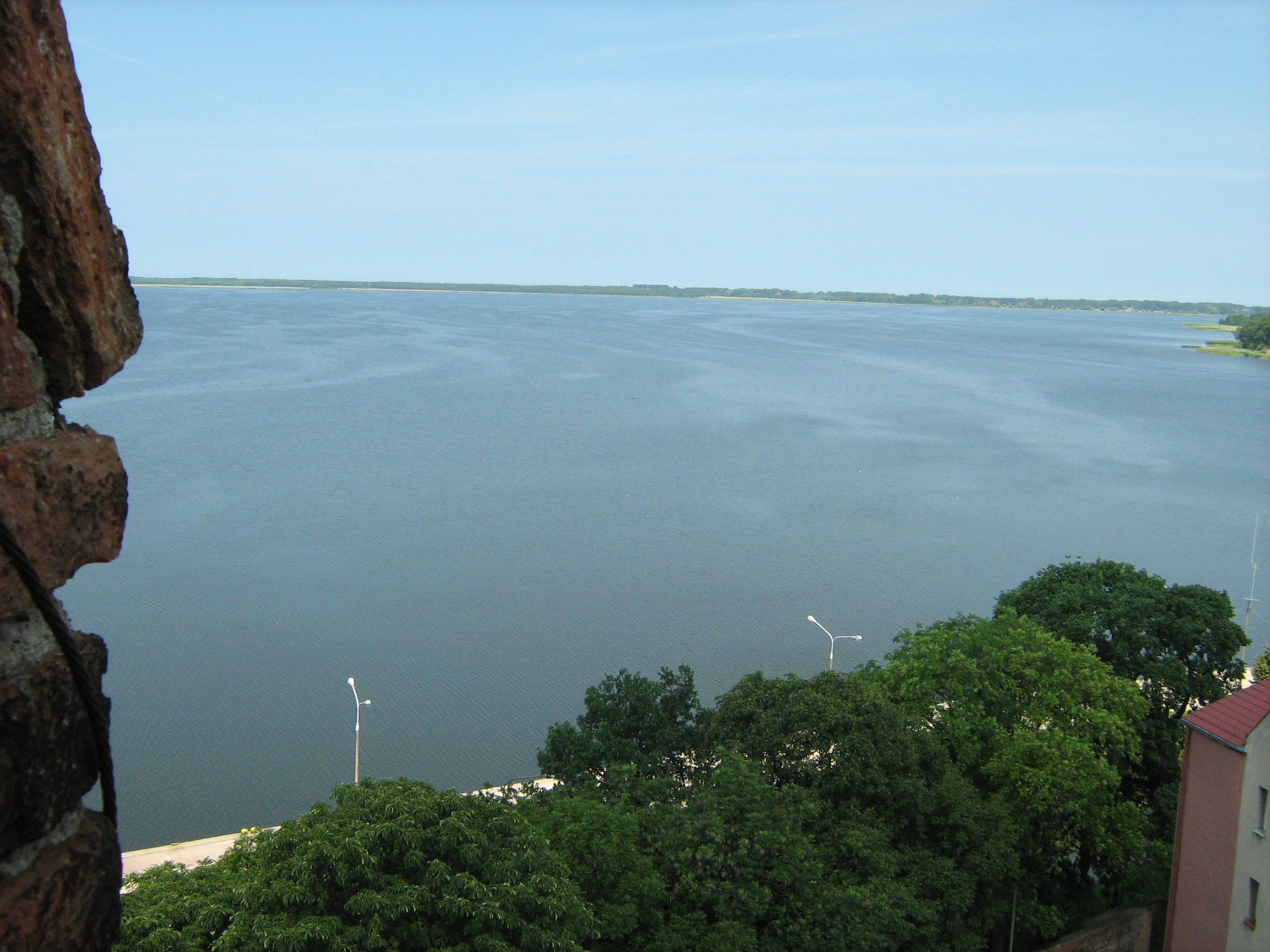
- A view of Kamieński Lagoon from Kamień Pomorski

- Kamieński Lagoon
- Location: Kamień County, West Pomeranian Voivodeship, Poland
- Coordinates: 53°59′25″N 14°44′55″E
- Primary inflows: Wołczenica, Świniec
- Islands: Chrząszczewska Island
- Settlements: Kamień Pomorski, Dziwnów, Międzywodzie

Kamień Lagoon is a lagoon on the Oder River in north-western Poland. It is part of the Dziwna.

Both the lagoon and the Dziwna are part of Poland's internal waters.

Several settlements lie on the shores of the lagoon, notably (in order of population) Kamień Pomorski, Dziwnów, Międzywodzie, Wrzosowo and Dziwnówek. There are also three small villages on Chrząszczewska Island: Chrząszczewo, Chrząszczewko and Buniewice.

Until 1945, the lagoon was referred to by its German name of Camminer Bodden. In 1949, it officially became called Kamieński Zalew, and in 1991 the words in its name were reversed, its new name being Zalew Kamieński.

== Gallery ==
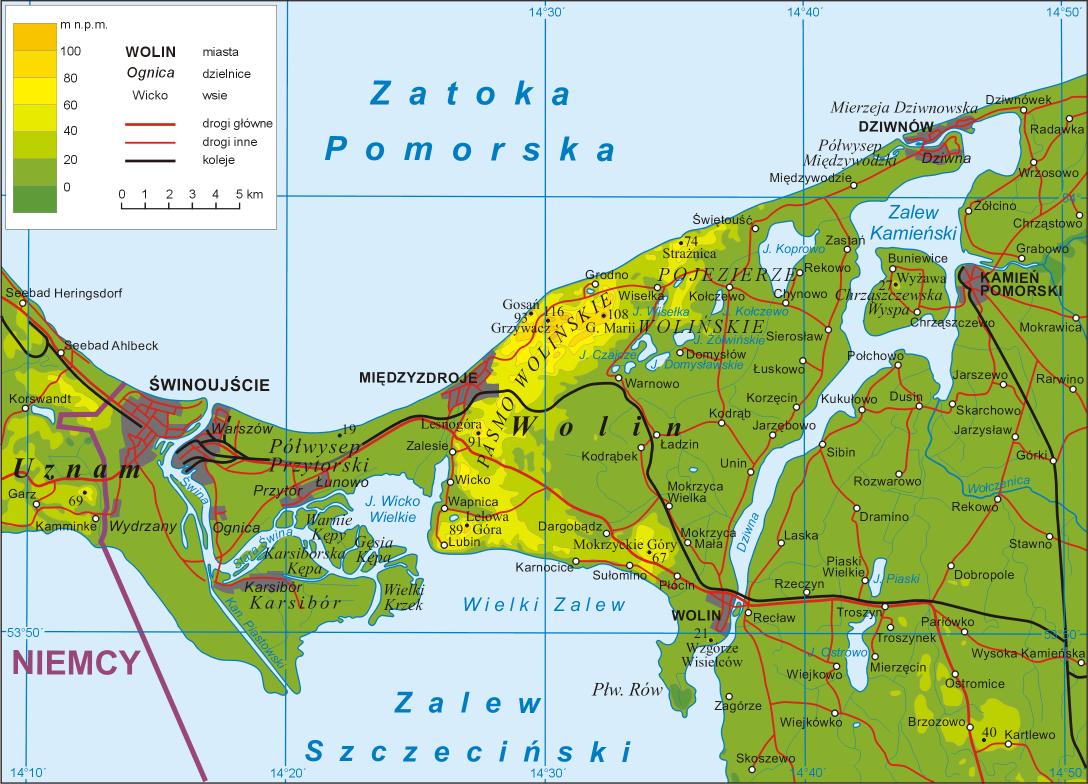
A map of the Kamień Lagoon and its surroundings.

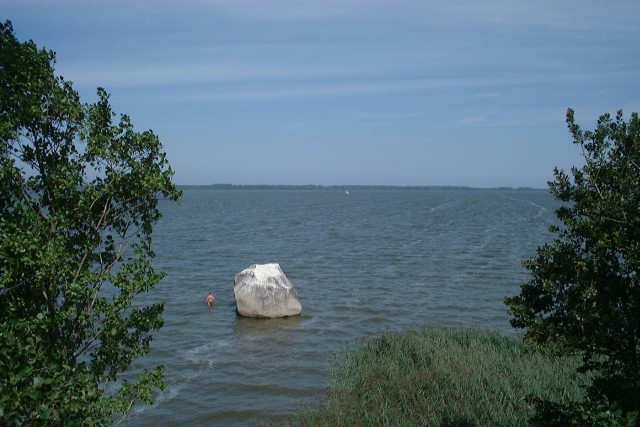
A view of the lagoon from Chrząszczewska Island.

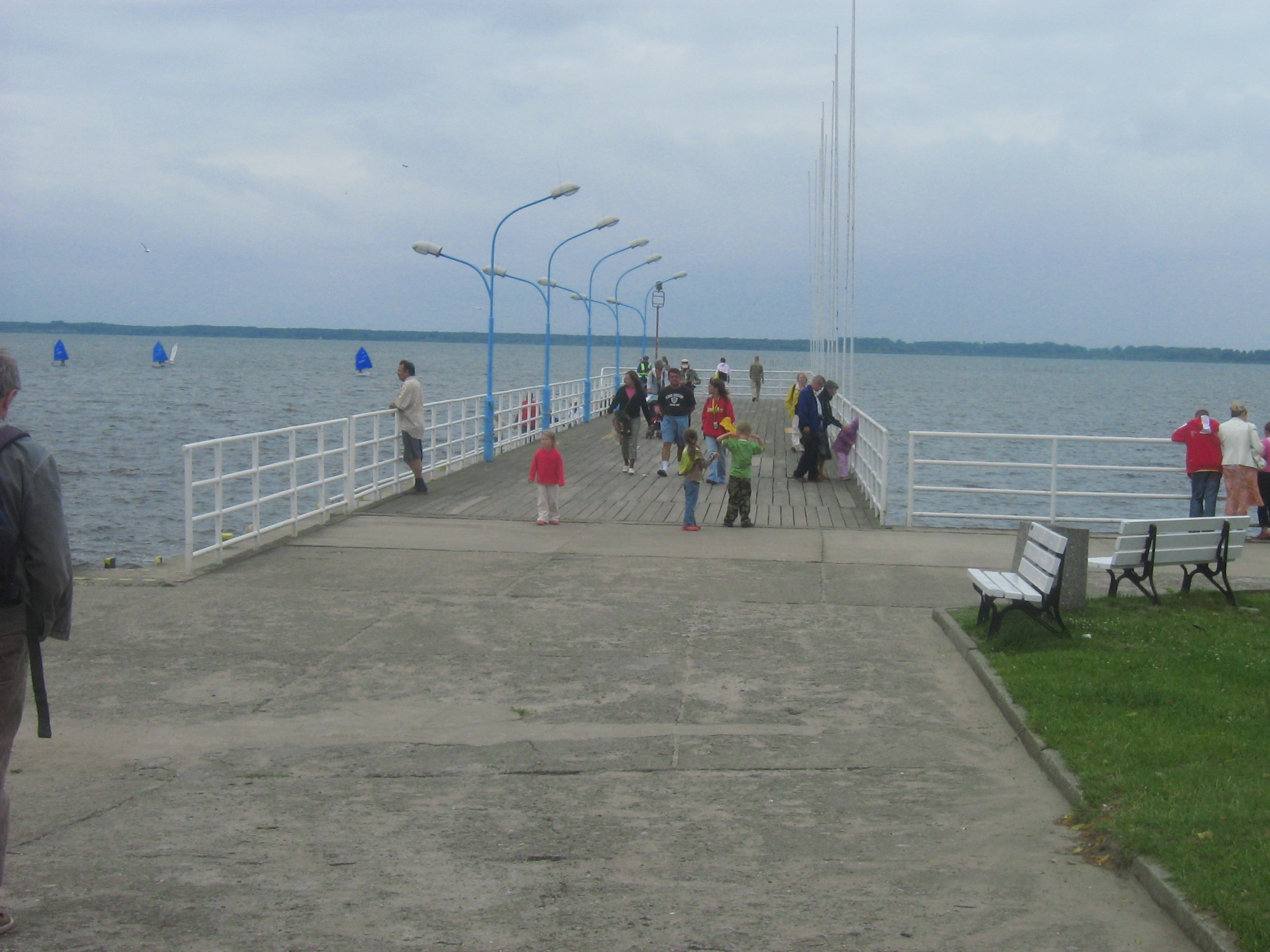
The pier in Kamień Pomorski, which hangs over the lagoon.

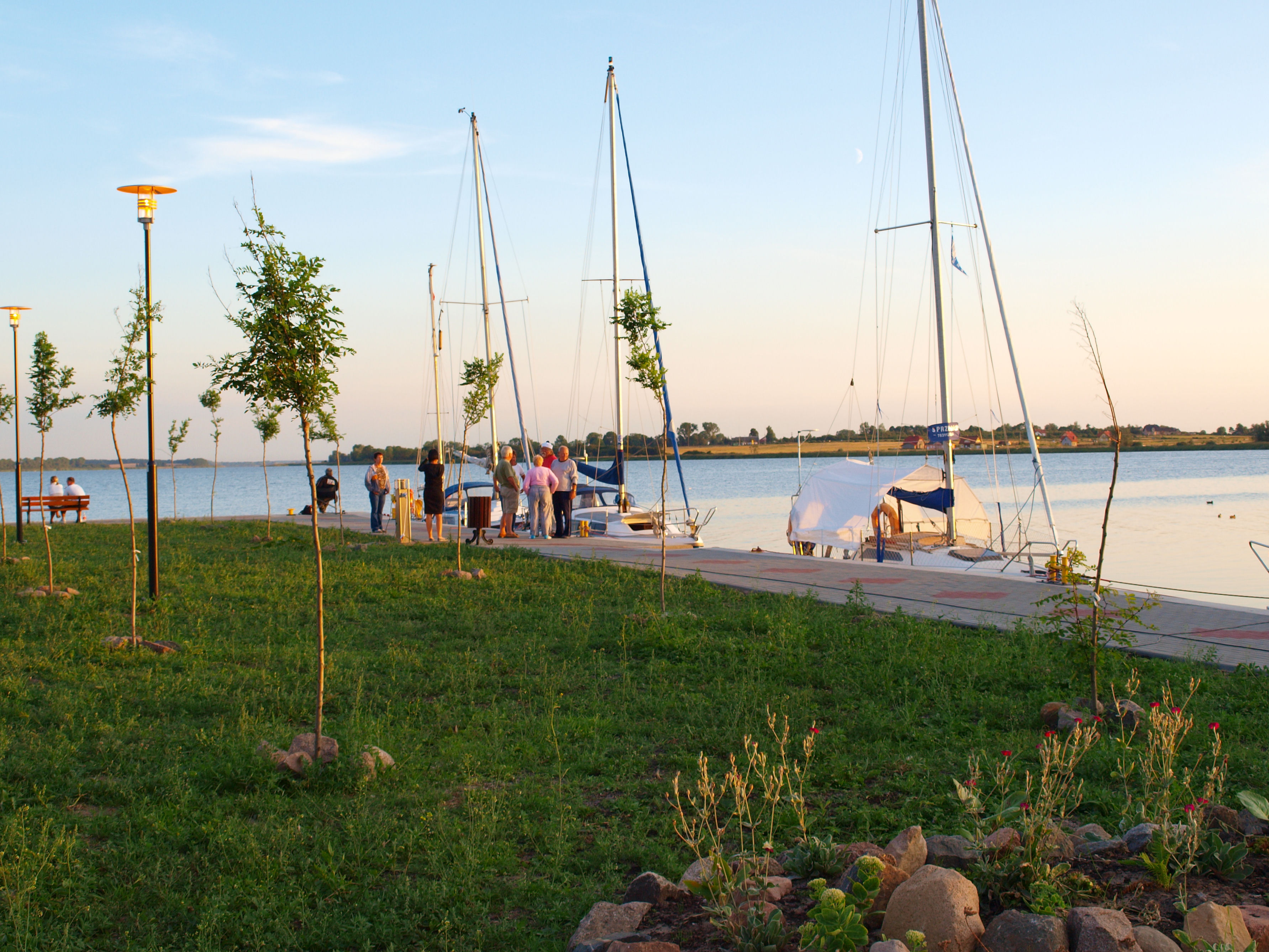
Boats moored on the lagoon at Międzywodzie.
