= Kozielice, Kamień County =

Kozielice
- Village
- Location within Poland
- Coordinates: 53°51′N 14°51′E
- Country: Poland
- Voivodeship: West Pomeranian
- County: Kamień
- Gmina: Golczewo
- Population: 150

Kozielice [kɔʑɛˈlit͡sɛ] (German: Köselitz) is a village in the administrative district of Gmina Golczewo, within Kamień County, West Pomeranian Voivodeship, in north-western Poland. It lies approximately 10 km (6 mi) west of Golczewo, 14 km (9 mi) south of Kamień Pomorski, and 52 km (32 mi) north of the regional capital Szczecin.

For the history of the region, see History of Pomerania.

The village has a population of 150.
