= Książ, West Pomeranian Voivodeship =

Książ
- Village
- Location within Poland
- Coordinates: 53°51′5″N 14°49′22″E
- Country: Poland
- Voivodeship: West Pomeranian
- County: Kamień
- Gmina: Golczewo
- Population: 20

Książ [kɕɔ̃ʂ] (German: Papenhagen) is a village in the administrative district of Gmina Golczewo, within Kamień County, West Pomeranian Voivodeship, in north-western Poland. It lies approximately 11 km (7 mi) west of Golczewo, 14 km (9 mi) south of Kamień Pomorski, and 51 km (32 mi) north of the regional capital Szczecin.

For the history of the region, see History of Pomerania.

The village has a population of 20.
