= Dobromyśl, West Pomeranian Voivodeship =

Dobromyśl
- Village
- Location within Poland
- Coordinates: 53°52′17″N 14°57′6″E
- Country: Poland
- Voivodeship: West Pomeranian
- County: Kamień
- Gmina: Golczewo
- Population: 10

Dobromyśl [dɔˈbrɔmɨɕl] (German: Augustenhöhe) is a village in the administrative district of Gmina Golczewo, within Kamień County, West Pomeranian Voivodeship, in north-western Poland. It lies approximately 6 km (4 mi) north of Golczewo, 16 km (10 mi) south-east of Kamień Pomorski, and 56 km (35 mi) north-east of the regional capital Szczecin.

The village has a population of 10.

== See also ==
- History of Pomerania
