= Samlino =

- Village
- Location within Poland
- Coordinates: 53°51′N 14°57′E
- Country: Poland
- Voivodeship: West Pomeranian
- County: Kamień
- Gmina: Golczewo

Samlino [samˈlinɔ] (German: Zemlin) is a village in the administrative district of Gmina Golczewo, within Kamień County, West Pomeranian Voivodeship, in north-western Poland. It lies approximately 4 km (2 mi) north-west of Golczewo, 18 km (11 mi) south-east of Kamień Pomorski, and 54 km (34 mi) north-east of the regional capital Szczecin.
