= Kłęby, Kamień County =

Kłęby
- Village
- Location within Poland
- Coordinates: 53°48′N 14°58′E
- Country: Poland
- Voivodeship: West Pomeranian
- County: Kamień
- Gmina: Golczewo

Kłęby [ˈkwɛmbɨ] (formerly German: Klemmen) is a village in the administrative district of Gmina Golczewo, within Kamień County, West Pomeranian Voivodeship, in north-western Poland. It lies approximately 4 km (2 mi) south of Golczewo, 23 km (14 mi) south-east of Kamień Pomorski, and 50 km (31 mi) north-east of the regional capital Szczecin.

== See also ==
- History of Pomerania
