= Pszczynka =

River in Poland

Coordinates: 50°02′22″N 19°08′40″E

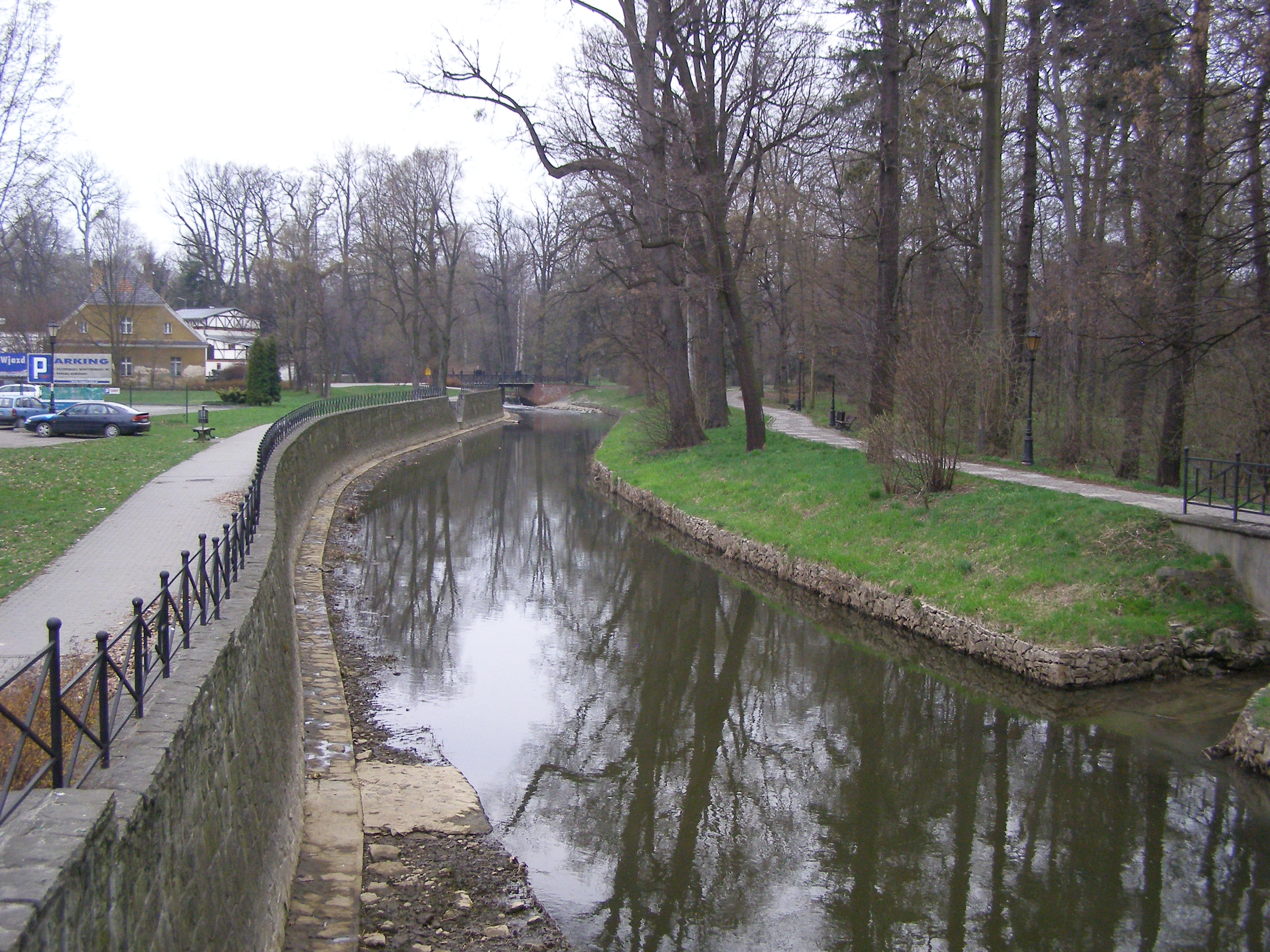
Pszczynka in Pszczyna

Pszczynka is a river in Silesian Voivodeship of Poland, a left tributary of the Vistula, 45.26 km long.

The sources of the river are located in Wodzisław County (near Gogołowa) and Jastrzębie-Zdrój. It flows through Pszczyna. On the river, there is Łąka retention reservoir. Its tributaries include Dokawa and Korzeniec.

== Gallery ==
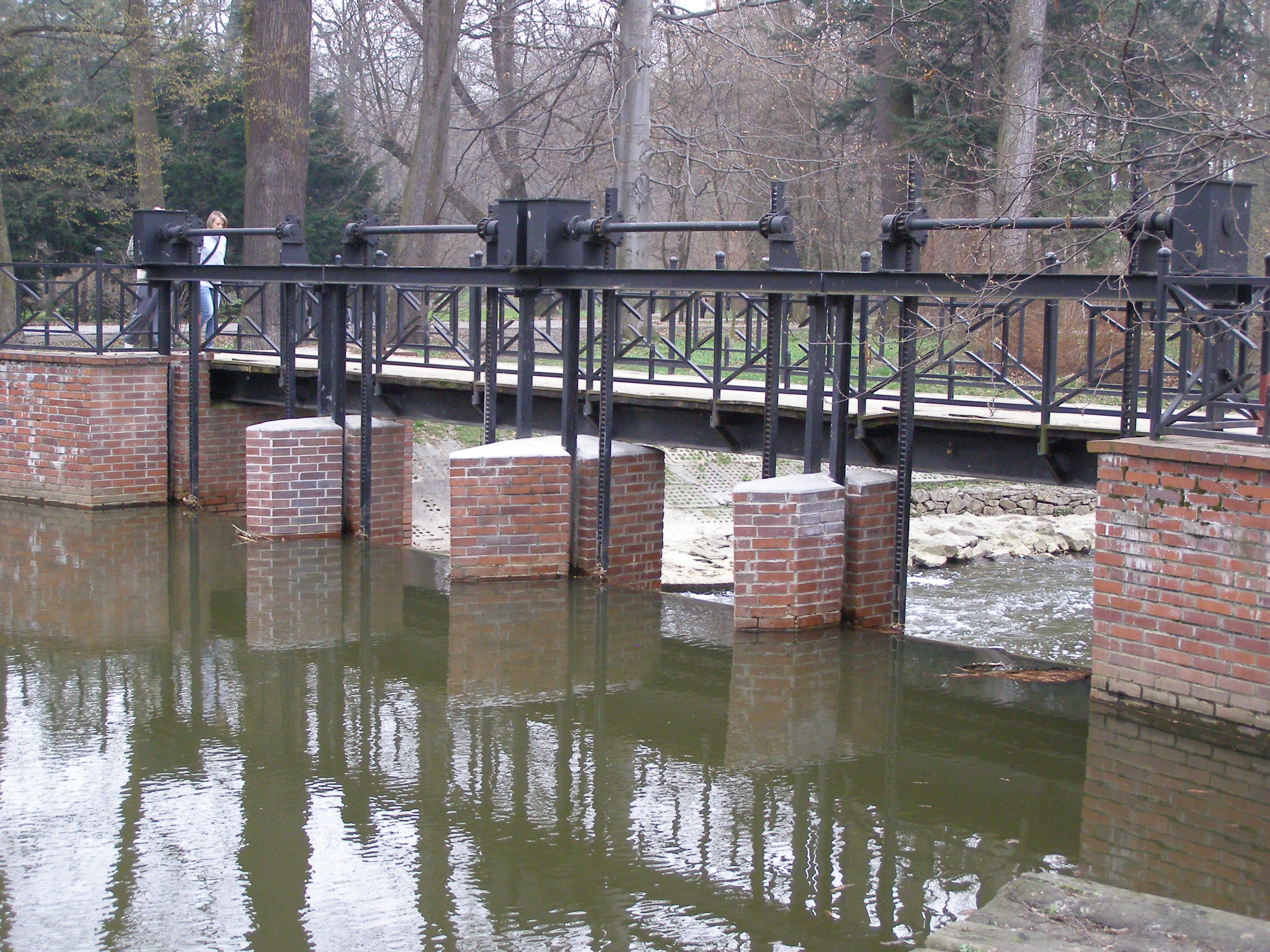

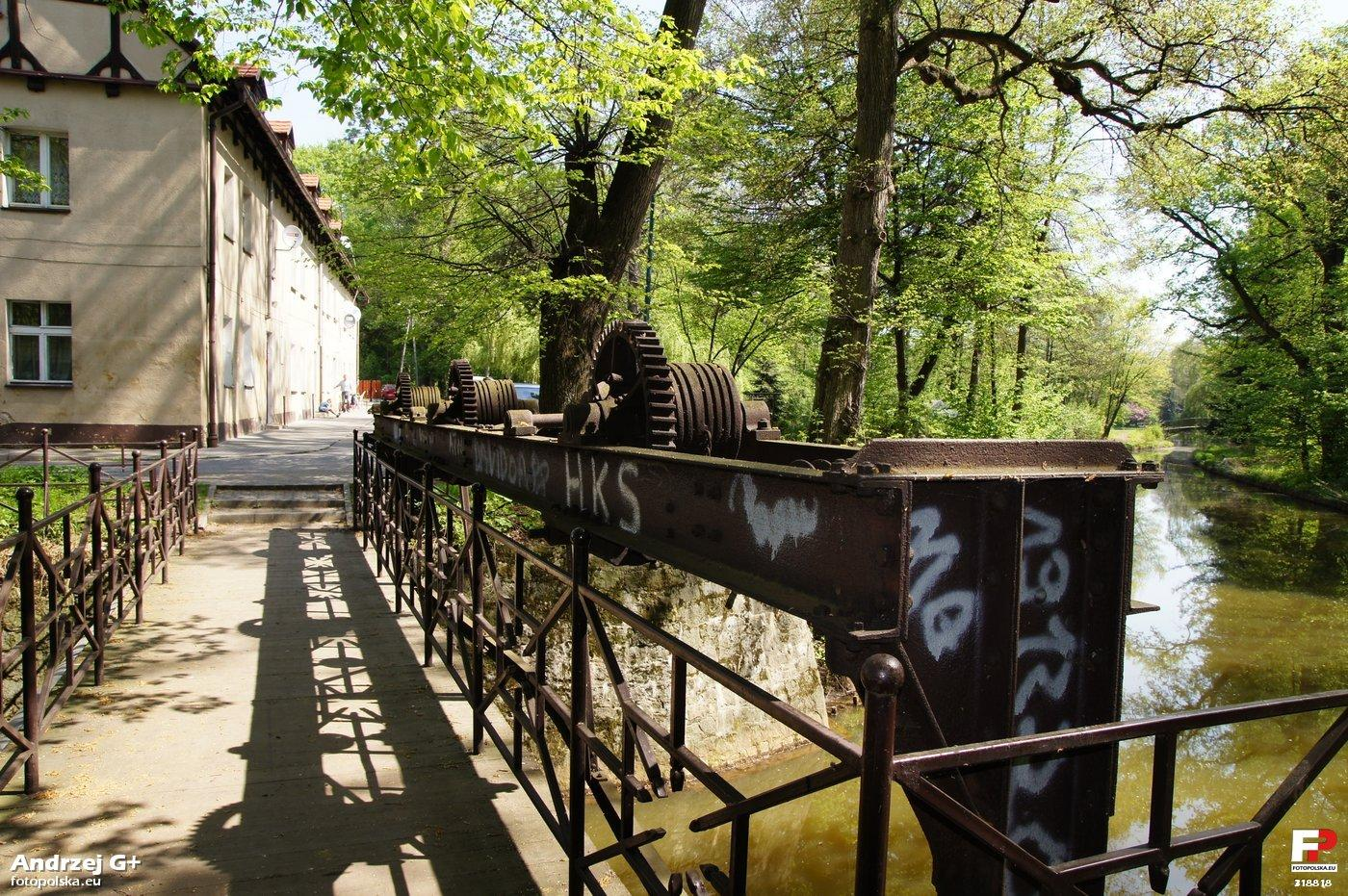

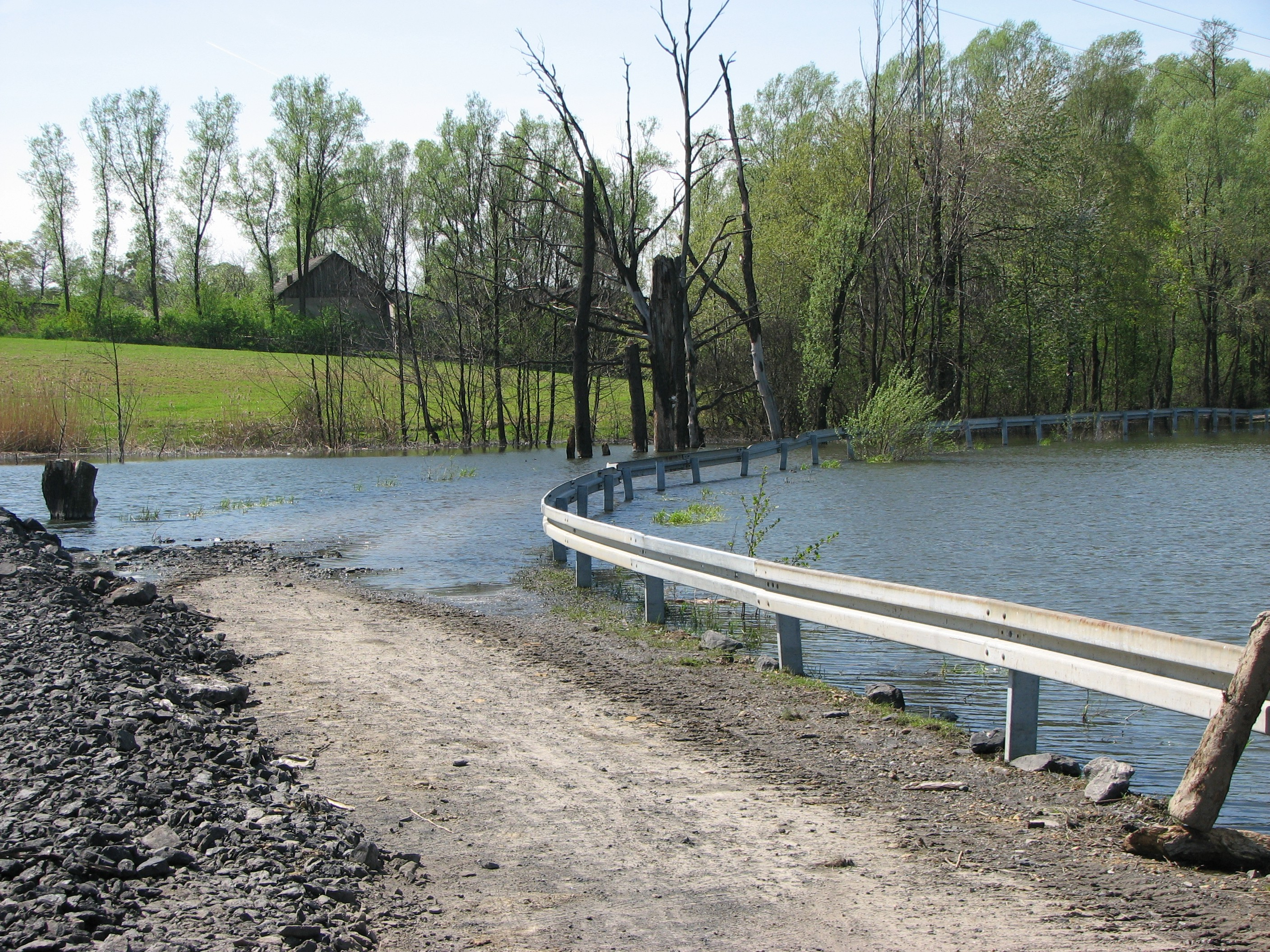

== See also ==
- List of rivers of Poland
