= Zielonka, West Pomeranian Voivodeship =

Zielonka
- Village
- Location within Poland
- Coordinates: 53°53′41″N 14°59′20″E
- Country: Poland
- Voivodeship: West Pomeranian
- County: Kamień
- Gmina: Golczewo

Population
  - Total: 10
- Time zone: UTC+1 (CET)
  - Summer (DST): UTC+2 (CEST)

Zielonka [ʑɛˈlɔnka] (German: Grünhof) is a village in the administrative district of Gmina Golczewo, within Kamień County, West Pomeranian Voivodeship, in north-western Poland. It lies approximately 8 km (5 mi) north of Golczewo, 16 km (10 mi) south-east of Kamień Pomorski, and 60 km (37 mi) north-east of the regional capital Szczecin.

The village has a population of 10.
