= Dargoszewko =

- Village
- Location within Poland
- Coordinates: 53°50′57″N 14°52′59″E
- Country: Poland
- Voivodeship: West Pomeranian
- County: Kamień
- Gmina: Golczewo

Dargoszewko [darɡɔˈʂɛfkɔ] (German: Neu Dargsow) is a village in the administrative district of Gmina Golczewo, within Kamień County, West Pomeranian Voivodeship, in north-western Poland.

== See also ==
- History of Pomerania
