= Żabie, West Pomeranian Voivodeship =

Żabie
- Settlement
- Location within Poland
- Coordinates: 53°49′35″N 15°01′47″E
- Country: Poland
- Voivodeship: West Pomeranian
- County: Kamień
- Gmina: Golczewo

Żabie [ˈʐabjɛ] (German: Hinzenhof) is a settlement in the administrative district of Gmina Golczewo, within Kamień County, West Pomeranian Voivodeship, in north-western Poland.
