= Gacko, Poland =

Gacko
- Settlement
- Location within Poland
- Coordinates: 53°53′30″N 15°2′38″E
- Country: Poland
- Voivodeship: West Pomeranian
- County: Kamień
- Gmina: Golczewo

Gacko (Polish: [ˈɡat͡skɔ]; German: Dammhof) is a settlement in the administrative district of Gmina Golczewo, within Kamień County, West Pomeranian Voivodeship, in north-western Poland.

== See also ==
- History of Pomerania
