= Golczewo-Gaj =

- Settlement
- Location within Poland
- Coordinates: 53°48′53″N 15°00′41″E
- Country: Poland
- Voivodeship: West Pomeranian
- County: Kamień
- Gmina: Golczewo

Golczewo-Gaj (Polish pronunciation: [ɡɔlˈtʂɛvɔ ˈɡaj]; German: Gülzow) is a settlement in the administrative district of Gmina Golczewo, within Kamień County, West Pomeranian Voivodeship, in north-western Poland.

== See also ==
- History of Pomerania
