= Wołowiec, Kamień County =

Wołowiec
- Village
- Location within Poland
- Coordinates: 53°52′36″N 15°00′51″E
- Country: Poland
- Voivodeship: West Pomeranian
- County: Kamień
- Gmina: Golczewo

Wołowiec [vɔˈwɔvjɛt͡s] (German Ravenhorst) is a village in the administrative district of Gmina Golczewo, within Kamień County, West Pomeranian Voivodeship, in north-western Poland.
