= Sosnowice, Kamień County =

Sosnowice
- Village
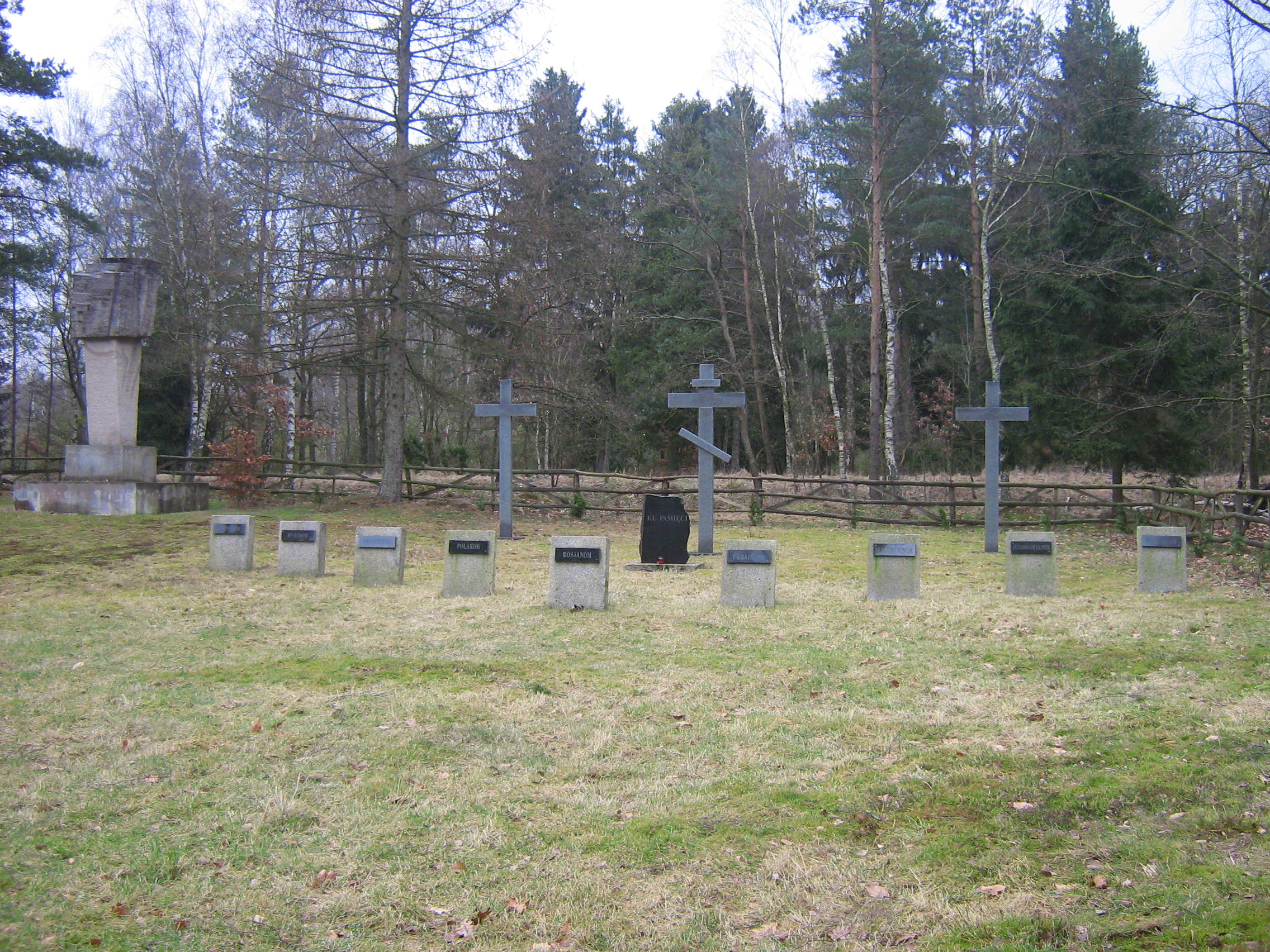

- Location within Poland
- Coordinates: 53°50′17″N 15°00′15″E
- Country: Poland
- Voivodeship: West Pomeranian
- County: Kamień
- Gmina: Golczewo

Sosnowice [sɔsnɔˈvit͡sɛ] is a village in the administrative district of Gmina Golczewo, within Kamień County, West Pomeranian Voivodeship, in north-western Poland.

For the history of the region, see History of Pomerania.
