= Unibórz =

- Village
- Location within Poland
- Coordinates: 53°49′N 15°3′E
- Country: Poland
- Voivodeship: West Pomeranian
- County: Kamień
- Gmina: Golczewo

Unibórz [uˈnibuʂ] (German Tonnebuhr) is a village in the administrative district of Gmina Golczewo, within Kamień County, West Pomeranian Voivodeship, in north-western Poland. It lies approximately 5 km (3 mi) east of Golczewo, 25 km (16 mi) south-east of Kamień Pomorski, and 55 km (34 mi) north-east of the regional capital Szczecin.

== See also ==
- History of Pomerania
