= Stuchowska Struga =

Location
- Country: Poland

Physical characteristics
- Mouth
  - location: Świniec
  - coordinates: 53°59′54″N 14°53′09″E

Basin features
- Progression: Świniec→ Dziwna→ Baltic Sea

Stuchowska Struga is a river of Poland, a tributary of the Świniec near Strzeżewo.
