= Baczysław =

- Village
- Location within Poland
- Coordinates: 53°50′N 14°52′E
- Country: Poland
- Voivodeship: West Pomeranian
- County: Kamień
- Gmina: Golczewo
- Population: 110

Baczysław [baˈt͡ʂɨswaf] (German: Batzlaff) is a village in the administrative district of Gmina Golczewo, within Kamień County, West Pomeranian Voivodeship, in north-western Poland. It lies approximately 8 km (5 mi) west of Golczewo, 17 km (11 mi) south of Kamień Pomorski, and 50 km (31 mi) north of the regional capital Szczecin.

The village has a population of 110.

== See also ==
- History of Pomerania
