= Strażnica, West Pomeranian Voivodeship =

Strażnica
- Settlement
- Location within Poland
- Coordinates: 53°50′21″N 14°48′45″E
- Country: Poland
- Voivodeship: West Pomeranian
- County: Kamień
- Gmina: Golczewo

Strażnica [straʐˈnit͡sa] (German: Wochholzhof) is a settlement in the administrative district of Gmina Golczewo, within Kamień County, West Pomeranian Voivodeship, in north-western Poland.

For the history of the region, see History of Pomerania.
