= Niwka, Kamień County =

Niwka
- Settlement
- Location within Poland
- Coordinates: 53°50′51″N 14°51′09″E
- Country: Poland
- Voivodeship: West Pomeranian
- County: Kamień
- Gmina: Golczewo

Niwka [ˈnifka] (German: Augustenhof) is a settlement in the administrative district of Gmina Golczewo, within Kamień County, West Pomeranian Voivodeship, in north-western Poland.
