= Prosna =

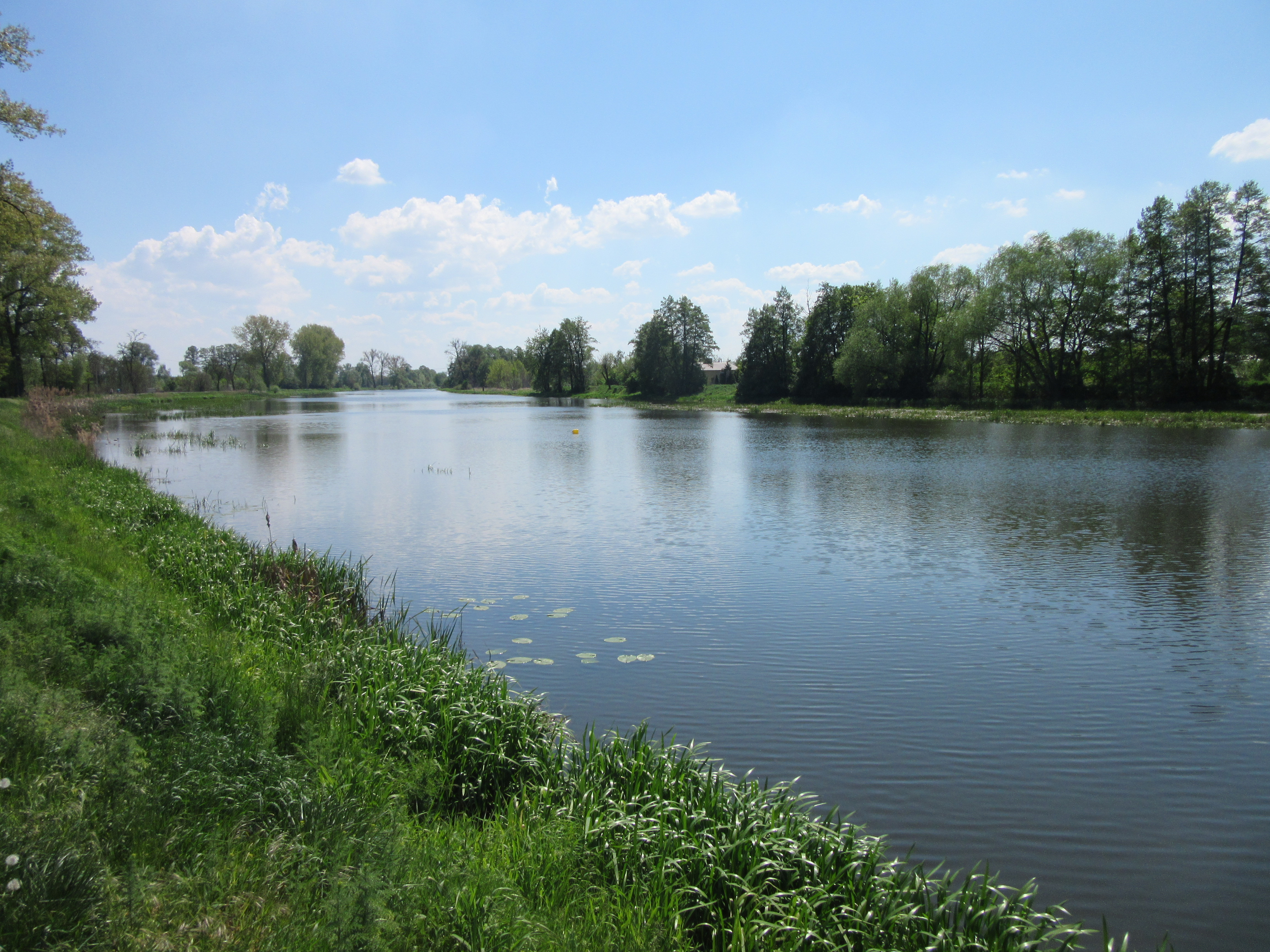

Physical characteristics
- Mouth
  - location: Warta
  - coordinates: 52.1417°N 17.6621°E
- Length: 227 km (141 mi)
- Basin size: 4,917 km^{2} (1,898 sq mi)
- Discharge
  - average: 17.4 m^{3}/s (610 cu ft/s)

Basin features
- Progression: Warta→ Oder→ Baltic Sea

The Prosna is a river in central Poland, in the Oder river basin. The Prosna is a left tributary of the Warta river (near Pyzdry), with a length of 227 kilometres and a basin area of 4,917 km^{2} (all in Poland). Until 1918, it marked the westernmost border of the Russian Empire. The towns of Kalisz and Chocz were right on the old frontier. After the proclamation of the second Polish Republic it marked the border between interwar Germany and Poland.

== Towns ==
- Gorzów Śląski
- Praszka
- Wieruszów
- Grabów nad Prosną
- Kalisz
- Chocz

== See also ==
- Rivers of Poland
