= Kłodzino, Kamień County =

Kłodzino
- Village
- Location within Poland
- Coordinates: 53°47′23″N 14°57′18″E
- Country: Poland
- Voivodeship: West Pomeranian
- County: Kamień
- Gmina: Golczewo
- Population: 160

Kłodzino [kwɔˈd͡ʑinɔ] (German: Klötzin) is a village in the administrative district of Gmina Golczewo, within Kamień County, West Pomeranian Voivodeship, in north-western Poland. It lies approximately 5 km (3 mi) south-west of Golczewo, 23 km (14 mi) south-east of Kamień Pomorski, and 49 km (30 mi) north-east of the regional capital Szczecin.

The village has a population of 160.

== See also ==
- History of Pomerania
