= Chrząszczewko =

- Village
- Location within Poland
- Coordinates: 53°58′21″N 14°43′06″E
- Country: Poland
- Voivodeship: West Pomeranian
- County: Kamień
- Gmina: Kamień Pomorski
- Population: 210
- Postal code: 72-400
- Area code: (+48) 91
- Vehicle registration: ZKA

Chrząszczewko [xʂɔ̃ʂˈt͡ʂɛvkɔ] is a hamlet on Chrząszczewska Island on Kamieński Lagoon, in north-west Poland. It has a population of 210.

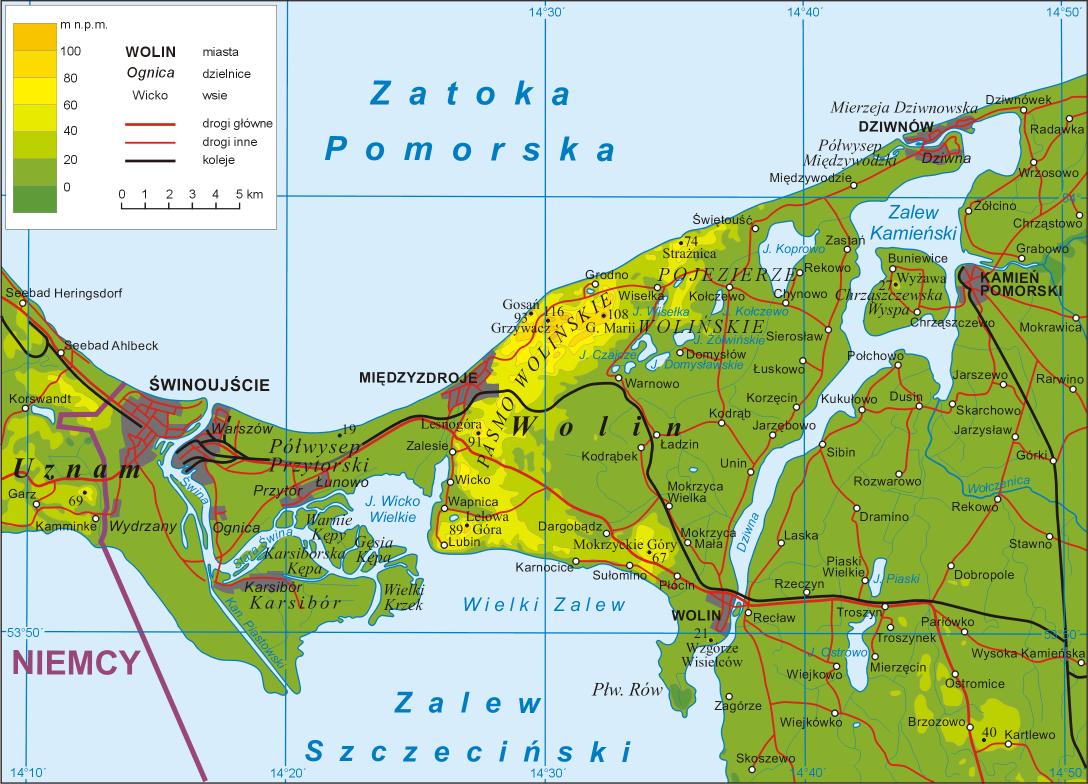
A map of the area, including the island where the hamlet is located.
