= Niemica, Kamień County =

Niemica
- Village
- Location within Poland
- Coordinates: 53°51′N 14°54′E
- Country: Poland
- Voivodeship: West Pomeranian
- County: Kamień
- Gmina: Golczewo
- Population: 230

Niemica [ɲɛˈmit͡sa] (German: Nemitz) is a village in the administrative district of Gmina Golczewo, within Kamień County, West Pomeranian Voivodeship, in north-western Poland. It lies approximately 6 km (4 mi) north-west of Golczewo, 16 km (10 mi) south-east of Kamień Pomorski, and 53 km (33 mi) north-east of the regional capital Szczecin.

The village has a population of 230.
