= Ronica =

- Village
- Location within Poland
- Coordinates: 53°48′31″N 14°55′47″E
- Country: Poland
- Voivodeship: West Pomeranian
- County: Kamień
- Gmina: Golczewo
- Time zone: UTC+1
  - Summer (DST): +2

Ronica [rɔˈnit͡sa] (German: Rönz) is a village in the administrative district of Gmina Golczewo, within Kamień County, West Pomeranian Voivodeship, in north-western Poland.

For the history of the region, see History of Pomerania.
