= Wysoka Kamieńska =

- Village
- Location within Poland
- Coordinates: 53°49′N 14°50′E
- Country: Poland
- Voivodeship: West Pomeranian
- County: Kamień
- Gmina: Golczewo
- Population: 672

Wysoka Kamieńska [vɨˈsɔka kaˈmjɛɲska] (German: Wietstock) is a village in the administrative district of Gmina Golczewo, within Kamień County, West Pomeranian Voivodeship, in north-western Poland. It lies approximately 10 km (6 mi) west of Golczewo, 18 km (11 mi) south of Kamień Pomorski, and 48 km (30 mi) north of the regional capital Szczecin. The village has a population of 672.

For the history of the region, see History of Pomerania.
