= Świniec (river) =

Location
- Country: Poland
- Voivodeship: West Pomeranian
- County (Powiat): Kamień

Physical characteristics
- Source
  - location: Łukęcin, Gmina Dziwnów
  - coordinates: 54°02′25.7″N 14°52′15.5″E
- Mouth: Kamień Lagoon
  - location: Kamień Pomorski, Gmina Kamień Pomorski
  - coordinates: 53°58′27″N 14°46′58″E
- Length: 39.2 km (24.4 mi)

Basin features
- Progression: Kamień Lagoon→ Dziwna→ Baltic Sea

The Świniec river is a river in Poland. The Niemica, Wołcza and Stuchowska Struga rivers are its tributaries, and it terminates into the Kamieński Lagoon.
