= Wołcza (river) =

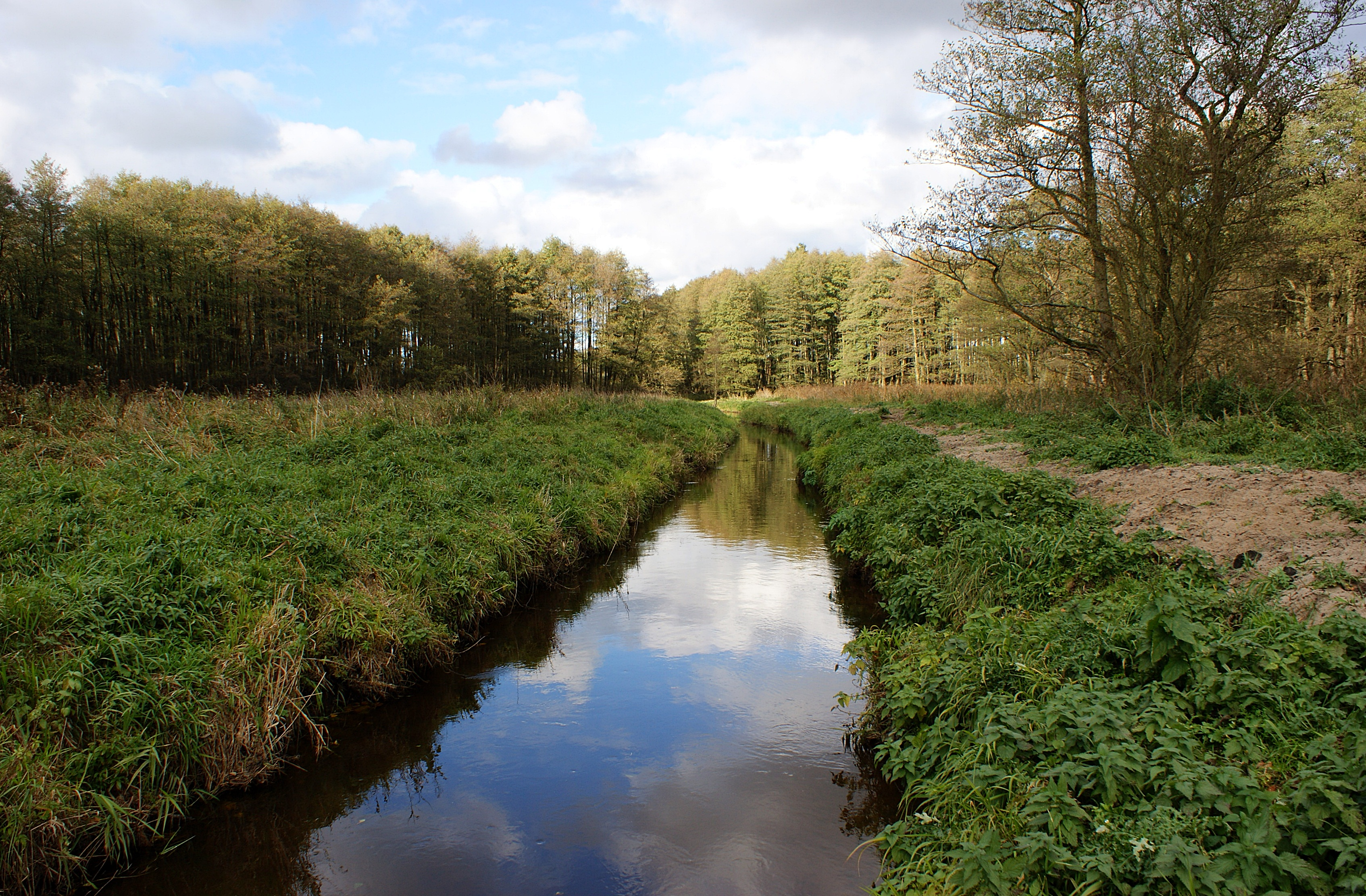
- Wołcza south of Jatki

Location
- Country: Poland
- Voivodeship: West Pomeranian

Physical characteristics
- Source
  - location: near Rzęsin, Gryfice County
  - coordinates: 53°53′29″N 15°07′29″E
- Mouth: Świniec
  - location: west of Świniec, Kamień County
  - coordinates: 53°59′28″N 14°51′39″E
- Length: 31.6 km (19.6 mi)

Basin features
- Progression: Świniec→ Dziwna→ Baltic Sea

Wołcza is a river of Poland, a tributary of the Świniec near Chrząstowo.
