= Gmina Golczewo =

Gmina Golczewo Golczewo Commune
- Gmina
- Flag Coat of arms
- Interactive map of Gmina Golczewo
- Coordinates (Golczewo): 53°49′34″N 14°58′55″E
- Country: Poland
- Voivodeship: West Pomeranian
- County: Kamień
- Seat: Golczewo

Area
  - Total: 175.39 km^{2} (67.72 sq mi)

Population (2006)
  - Total: 6,065
  - Density: 34.58/km^{2} (89.56/sq mi)
  - Urban: 2,724
  - Rural: 3,341
- Website: http://www.golczewo.pl/

Gmina Golczewo is an urban-rural gmina (administrative district) in Kamień County, West Pomeranian Voivodeship, in north-western Poland. Its seat is the town of Golczewo, which lies approximately 21 kilometres (13 mi) south-east of Kamień Pomorski and 53 km (33 mi) north-east of the regional capital Szczecin.

The gmina covers an area of 175.39 square kilometres (67.7 sq mi), and as of 2006 its total population is 6,065 (out of which the population of Golczewo amounts to 2,724, and the population of the rural part of the gmina is 3,341).

== Villages ==
Apart from the town of Golczewo, Gmina Golczewo contains the villages and settlements of Baczysław, Barnisławice, Dargoszewko, Dargoszewo, Dobromyśl, Drzewica, Gacko, Gadom, Golczewo-Gaj, Imno, Kłęby, Kłodzino, Koplino, Kozielice, Kretlewo, Książ, Mechowo, Niemica, Niwka, Ronica, Samlino, Sosnowice, Strażnica, Unibórz, Upadły, Wołowiec, Wysoka Kamieńska, Żabie and Zielonka.

== Neighbouring gminas ==
Gmina Golczewo is bordered by the gminas of Gryfice, Kamień Pomorski, Nowogard, Płoty, Przybiernów, Świerzno and Wolin.
