= Mokrawica =

- Village
- Location within Poland
- Coordinates: 53°57′7″N 14°50′17″E
- Country: Poland
- Voivodeship: West Pomeranian
- County: Kamień
- Gmina: Kamień Pomorski

Mokrawica [mɔkraˈvit͡sa] (German: Mokratz) is a village in the administrative district of Gmina Kamień Pomorski, within Kamień County, West Pomeranian Voivodeship, in north-western Poland. It lies approximately 4 km (2 mi) south-east of Kamień Pomorski and 62 km (39 mi) north of the regional capital Szczecin.

For the history of the region, see History of Pomerania.
