= Gadom =

- Village
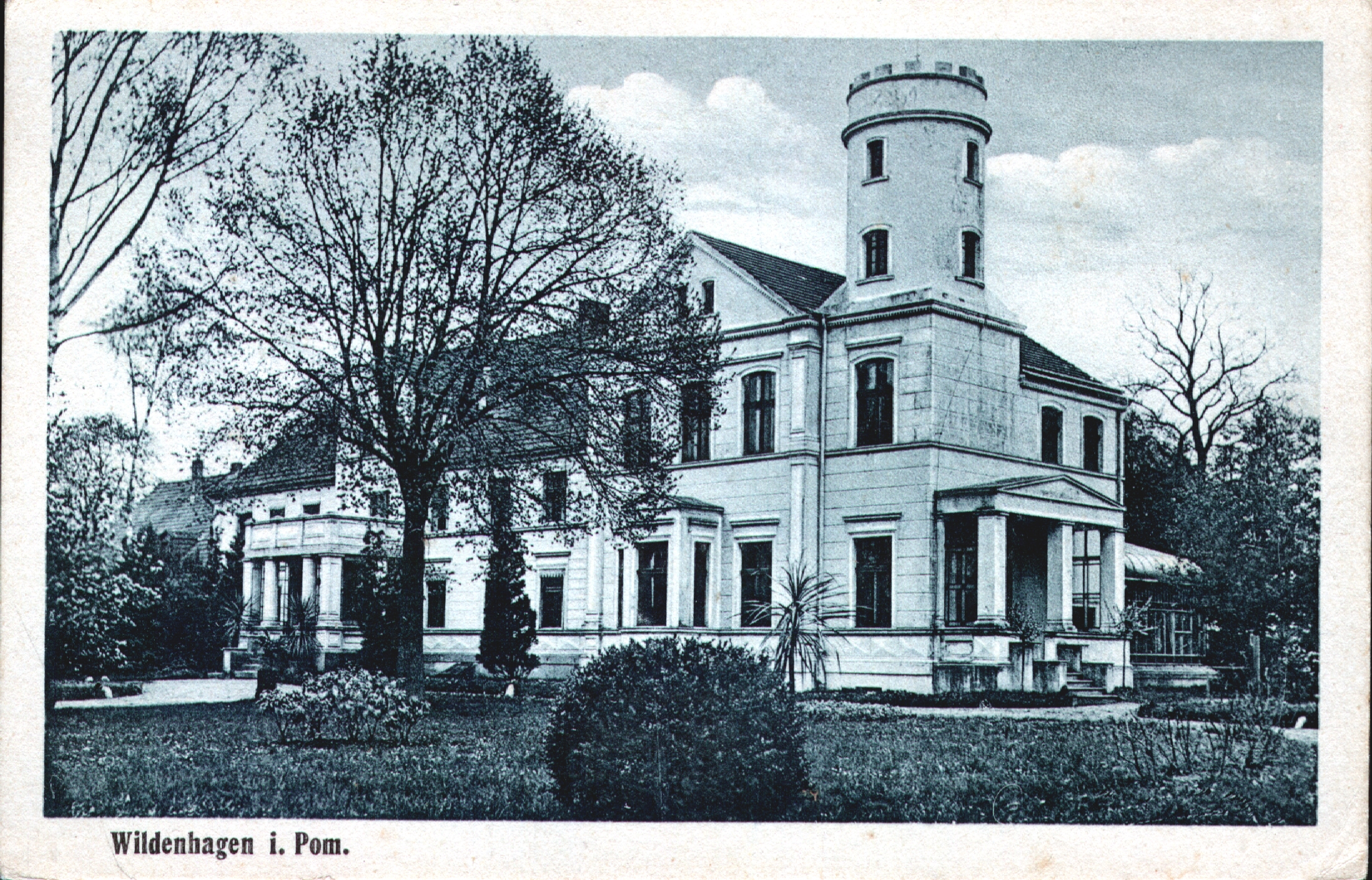
- Palace in Gadom

- Location within Poland
- Coordinates: 53°49′56″N 14°55′24″E
- Country: Poland
- Voivodeship: West Pomeranian
- County: Kamień
- Gmina: Golczewo
- Population (approx.): 150

Gadom [ˈɡadɔm] (German: Wildenhagen) is a village in the administrative district of Gmina Golczewo, within Kamień County, West Pomeranian Voivodeship, in north-western Poland.

The village has an approximate population of 150.
