= Szumiąca, West Pomeranian Voivodeship =

Szumiąca
- Village
- Location within Poland
- Coordinates: 53°55′12″N 14°51′58″E
- Country: Poland
- Voivodeship: West Pomeranian
- County: Kamień
- Gmina: Kamień Pomorski

Szumiąca [ʂuˈmjɔnt͡sa] (German: Königsmühl) is a village in the administrative district of Gmina Kamień Pomorski, within Kamień County, West Pomeranian Voivodeship, in north-western Poland. It lies approximately 8 km (5 mi) south-east of Kamień Pomorski and 59 km (37 mi) north of the regional capital Szczecin.

For the history of the region, see History of Pomerania.
