= Kretlewo =

- Village
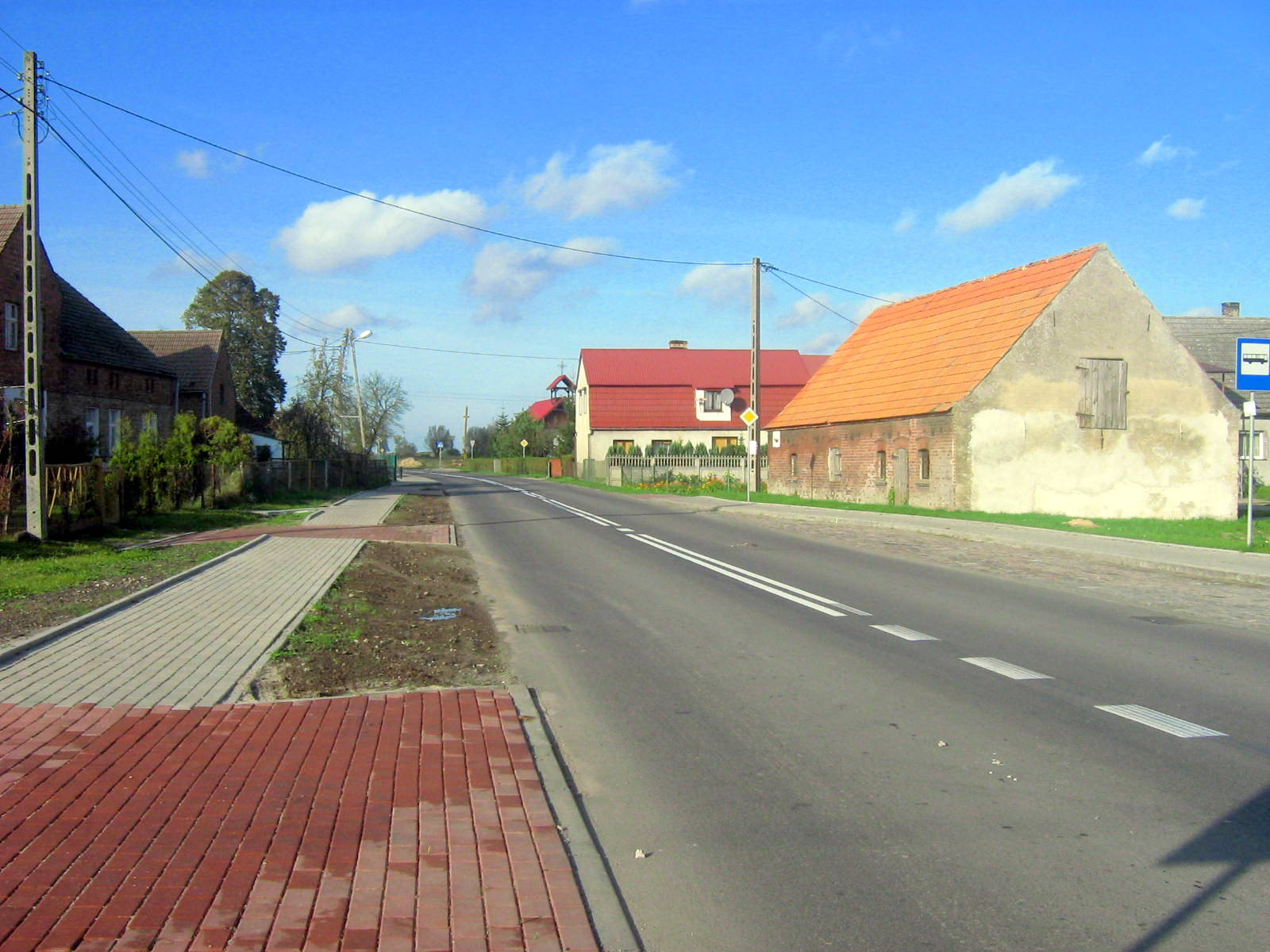

- Location within Poland
- Coordinates: 53°49′46″N 14°53′30″E
- Country: Poland
- Voivodeship: West Pomeranian
- County: Kamień
- Gmina: Golczewo

Kretlewo [krɛˈtlɛvɔ] (German: Kretlow) is a village in the administrative district of Gmina Golczewo, within Kamień County, West Pomeranian Voivodeship, in north-western Poland.

For the history of the region, see History of Pomerania.
