= Grabowo, Kamień County =

Grabowo
- Village
- Location within Poland
- Coordinates: 53°58′35″N 14°48′17″E
- Country: Poland
- Voivodeship: West Pomeranian
- County: Kamień
- Gmina: Kamień Pomorski

Grabowo [ɡraˈbɔvɔ] (formerly German: Grabow) is a village in the administrative district of Gmina Kamień Pomorski, within Kamień County, West Pomeranian Voivodeship, in north-western Poland. It lies approximately 2 km (1 mi) north-east of Kamień Pomorski and 64 km (40 mi) north of the regional capital Szczecin.

For the history of the region, see History of Pomerania.
