= Buniewice =

- Village
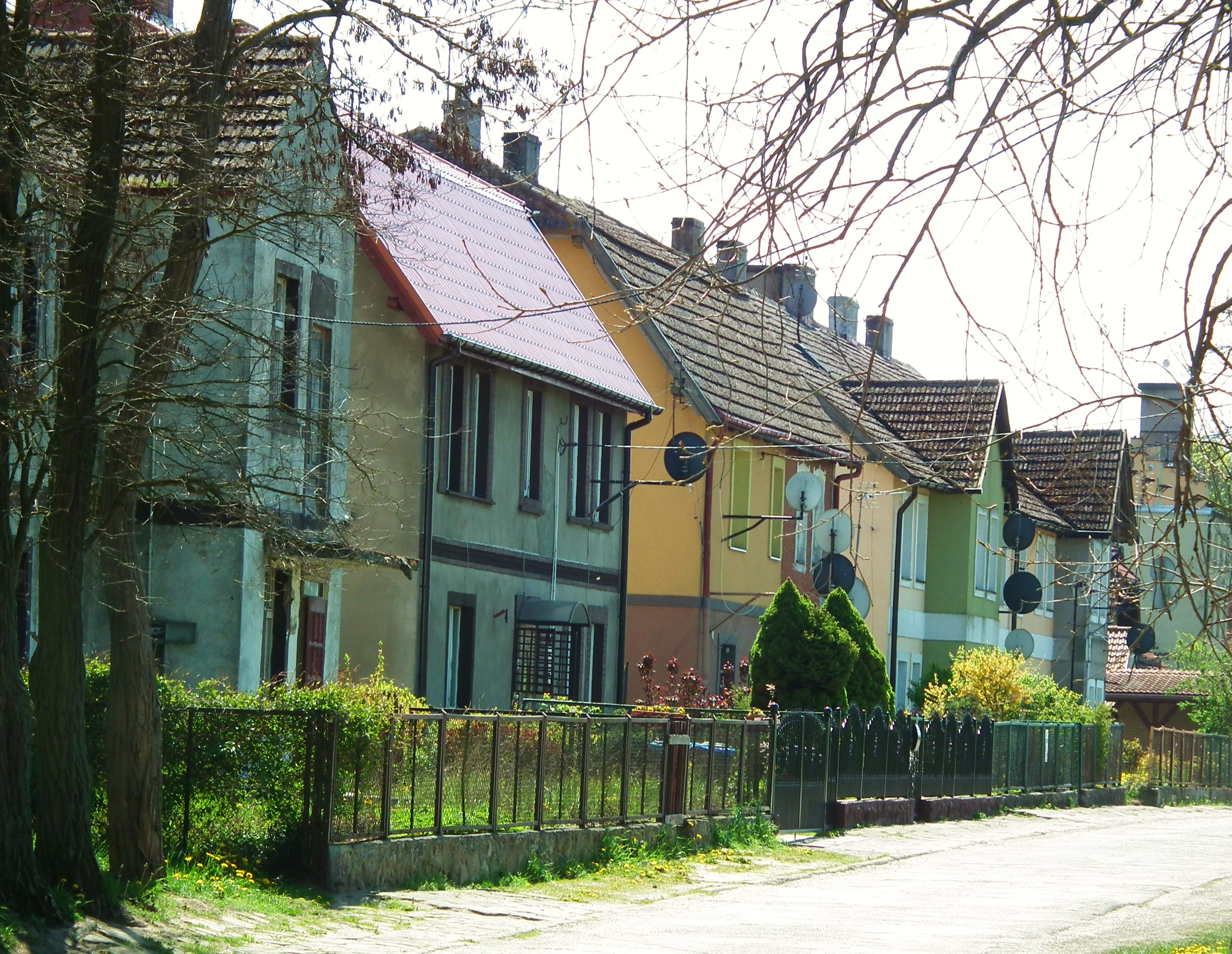
- Center of the village

- Location within Poland
- Coordinates: 53°58′21″N 14°43′6″E
- Country: Poland
- Voivodeship: West Pomeranian
- County: Kamień
- Gmina: Kamień Pomorski
- Population (approx.): 300

Buniewice [buɲɛˈvit͡sɛ] (German: Bünnewitz) is a village in the administrative district of Gmina Kamień Pomorski, within Kamień County, West Pomeranian Voivodeship, in north-western Poland. It lies approximately 5 km (3 mi) west of Kamień Pomorski and 63 km (39 mi) north of the regional capital Szczecin.

The village has an approximate population of 300.
