= Dziwna =

Distributary of the Oder River in Poland

Coordinates: 53°55′29″N 14°41′13″E

- German: Dievenow
- Interactive map of Dziwna
- Location: Kamień County, West Pomeranian Voivodeship, Poland
- Primary inflows: Szczecin Lagoon
- Primary outflows: Baltic Sea
- Max. length: 30.348 km (18.857 mi)
- Islands: Chrząszczewo Island
- Settlements: Wolin

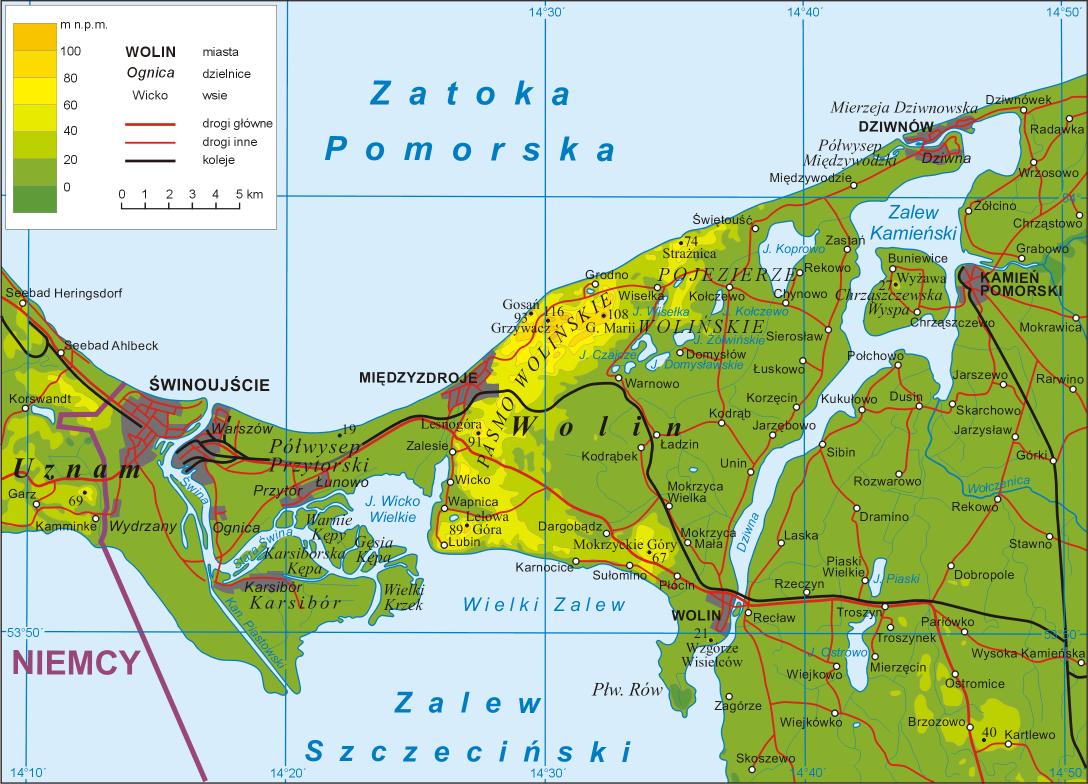
Map of the Dziwna (right) and its region

The Dziwna (German: Dievenow) is a channel of the Oder River in northwestern Poland, one of three straits connecting the Szczecin Lagoon with the Bay of Pomerania of the Baltic Sea. It separates the island of Wolin from the Polish mainland. The other two channels are the Świna and the Peene.

About 32 km (20 mi) in length, the Dziwna forms on the eastern end of the Szczecin Lagoon, near the town of Zagórze, Kamień County. Flowing north, it passes the town of Wolin and then widens and forms a number of connected features. Towards the west the main channel of the Dziwna forms the large Kamieński Lagoon (Polish: Zalew Kamieński). To the east a side channel develops into the Zatoka Cicha (Quiet Bay, known as Die Maad before 1949), flows north through the strait of Promna as it approaches the city of Kamień Pomorski, then rejoins the Kamieński Lagoon. Between these two channels stands the small, largely agricultural island of Chrząszczewo connected to Kamień Pomorski by a single bridge.

The Kamieński Lagoon reforms into the well-defined Zatoka Wrzosowska (Wrzosowska Bay), narrows, then flows past the coastal city of Dziwnów for just a few kilometers as the Dziwna again before finally reaching the Bay of Pomerania.

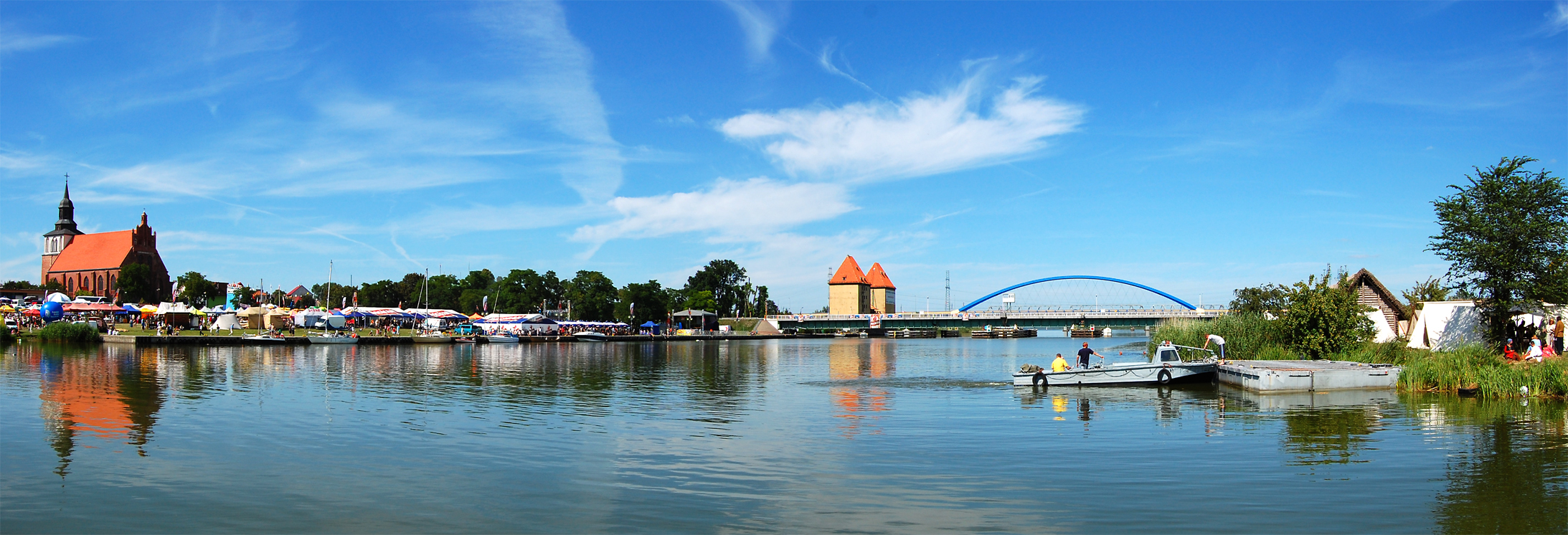
Dziwna in Wolin
