= Chrząszczewo, West Pomeranian Voivodeship =

Chrząszczewo
- Village
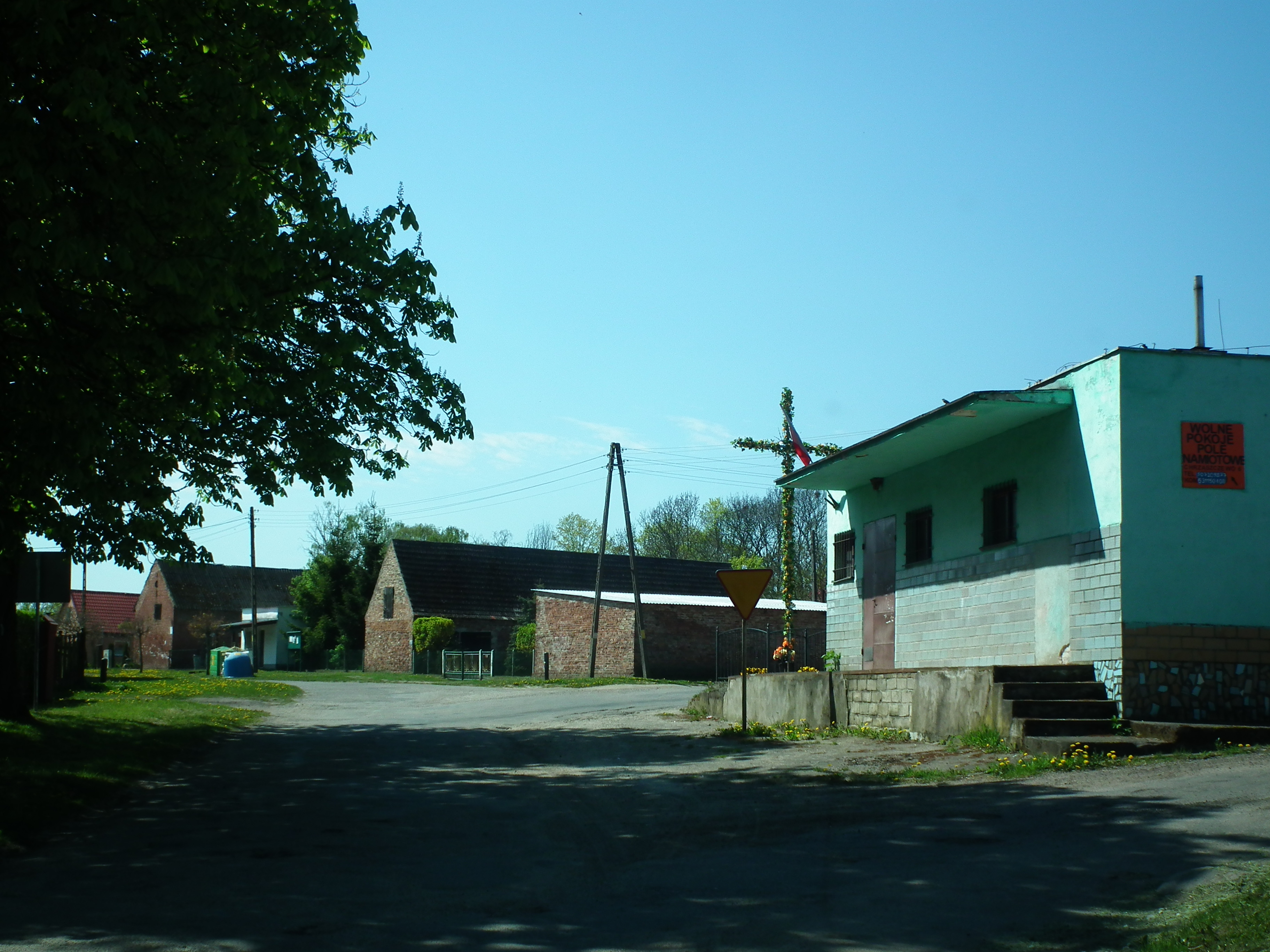
- Cross in Chrząszczewo

- Location within Poland
- Coordinates: 53°57′28″N 14°44′24″E
- Country: Poland
- Voivodeship: West Pomeranian
- County: Kamień
- Gmina: Kamień Pomorski

Population
  - Total: 150

Chrząszczewo [xʂɔ̃ʂˈt͡ʂɛvɔ] (German: Gristow) is a village in the administrative district of Gmina Kamień Pomorski, within Kamień County, West Pomeranian Voivodeship, in north-western Poland.

The village has a population of 150.

== See also ==
History of Pomerania
