= Golczewo =

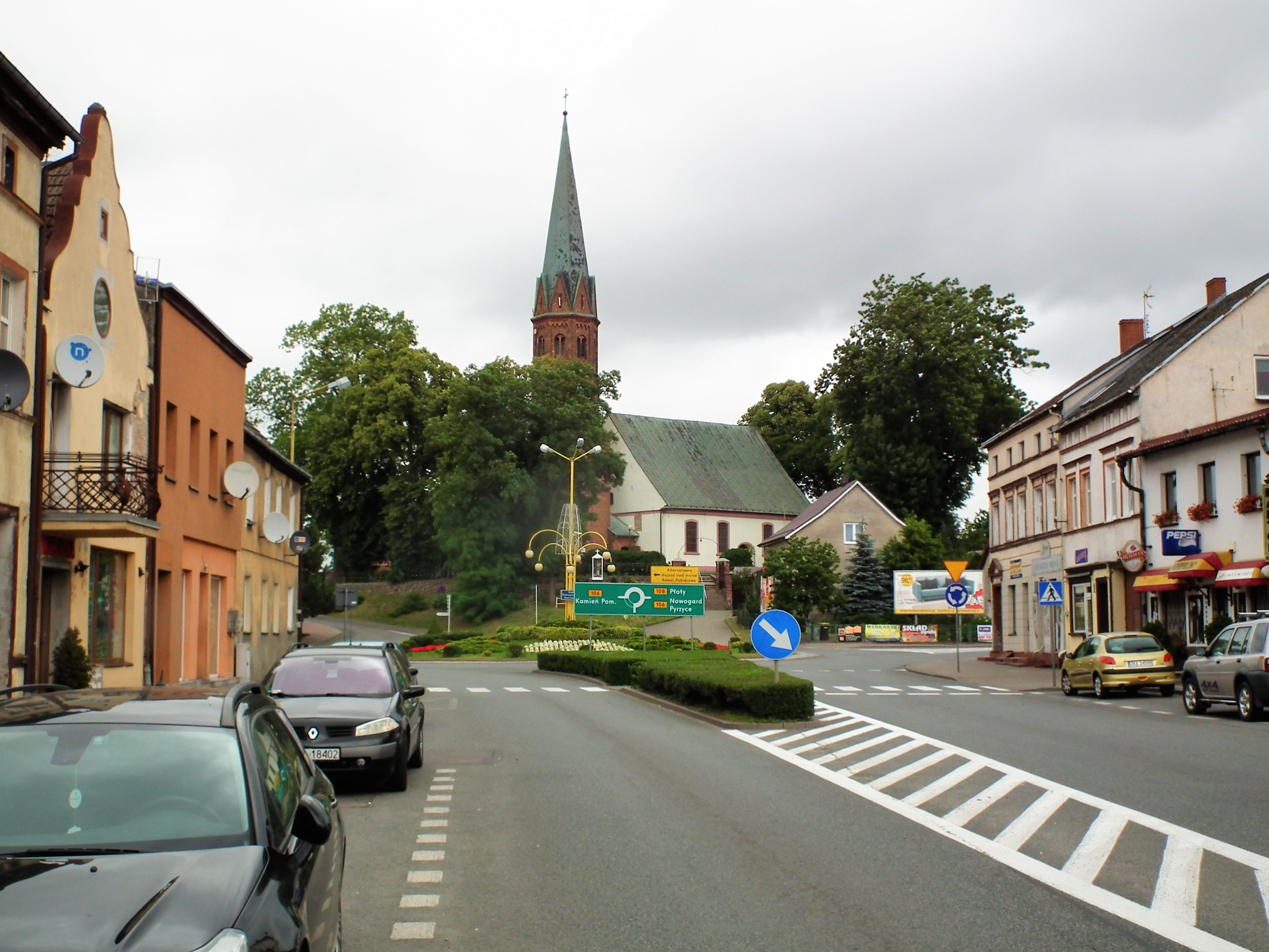
- Town center with the Gothic Saint Andrew Bobola church

- Flag Coat of arms

- Location within Poland
- Coordinates: 53°49′34″N 14°58′55″E
- Country: Poland
- Voivodeship: West Pomeranian
- County: Kamień
- Gmina: Golczewo

Area
  - Total: 7.42 km^{2} (2.86 sq mi)

Population (2006)
  - Total: 2,724
  - Density: 367/km^{2} (951/sq mi)
- Time zone: UTC+1 (CET)
  - Summer (DST): UTC+2 (CEST)
- Postal code: 72-410
- Vehicle registration: ZKA
- Website: http://www.golczewo.pl/

Golczewo [ɡɔlˈt͡ʂɛvɔ] (German: Gülzow) is a town in Kamień County, West Pomeranian Voivodeship, in north-western Poland. It is situated on the Niemica River and the shores of Okonie and Szczucze lakes.

== Sights ==
Chief cultural heritage sights are the medieval Golczewo Castle Tower, the only preserved part of a former castle of the Bishops of Kamień, and the Gothic Saint Andrew Bobola church.

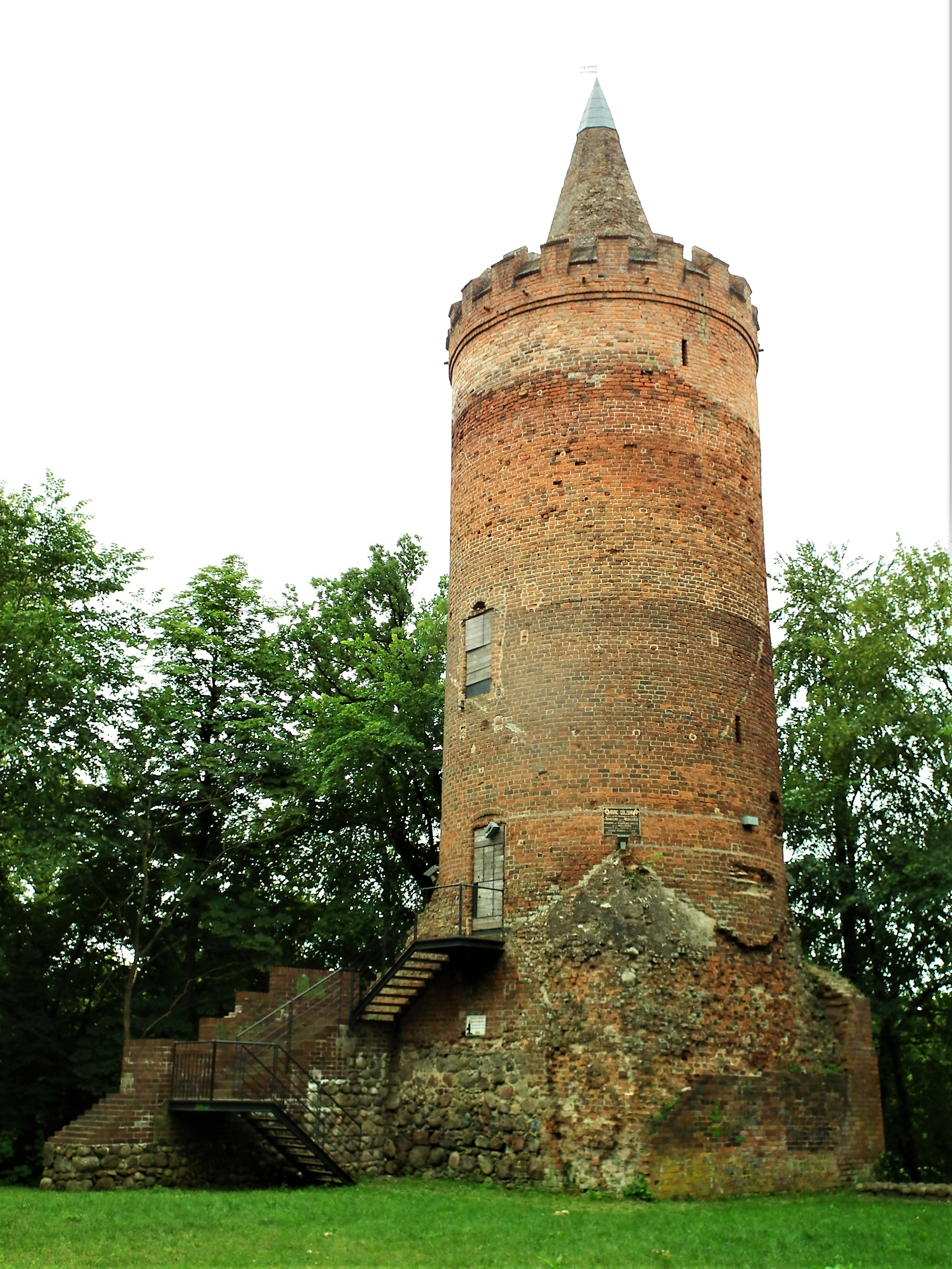
Golczewo Castle Tower

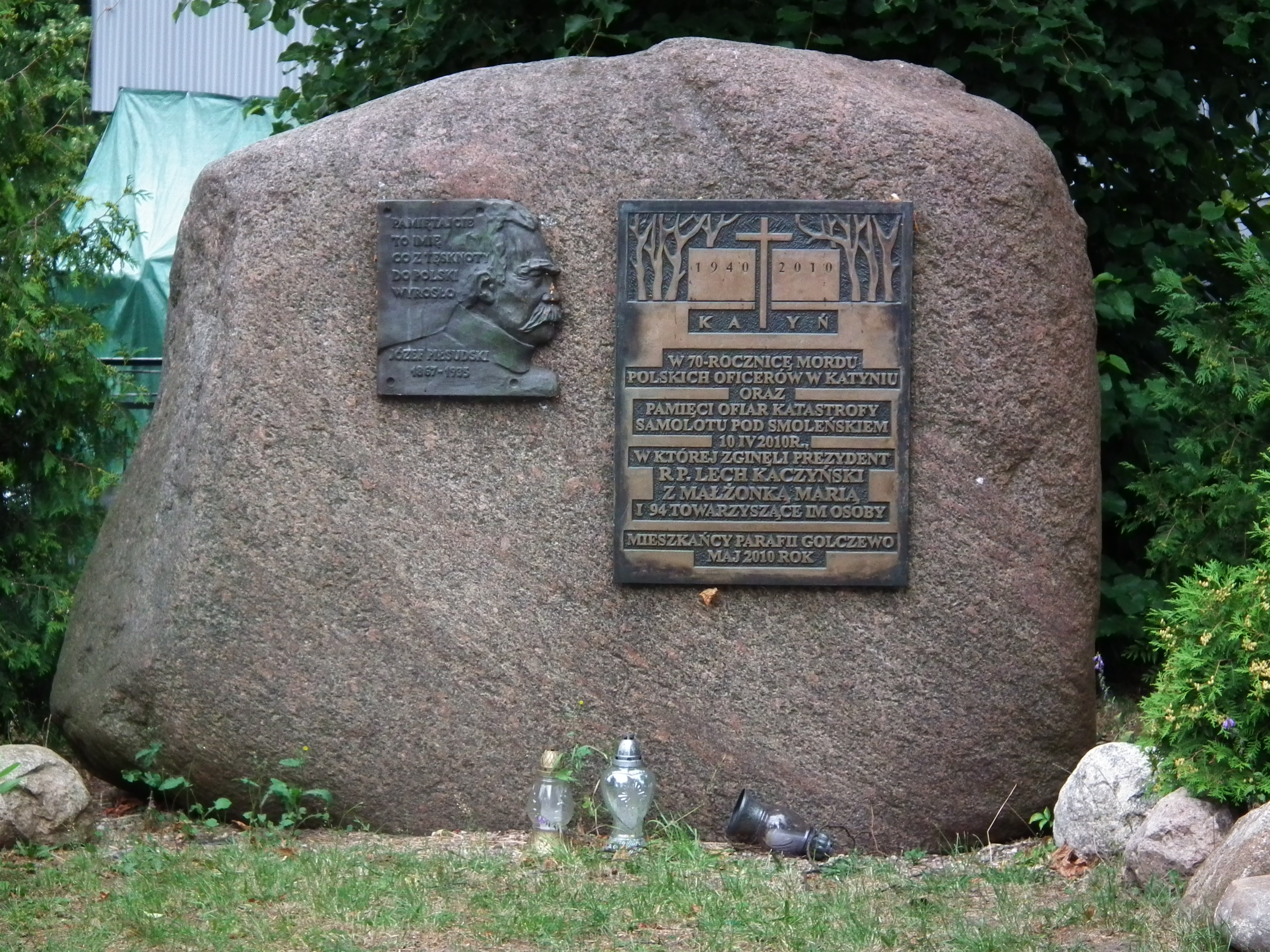
Memorial to the victims of the Katyn massacre and Smolensk air disaster
