= Wołczenica =

River in Poland

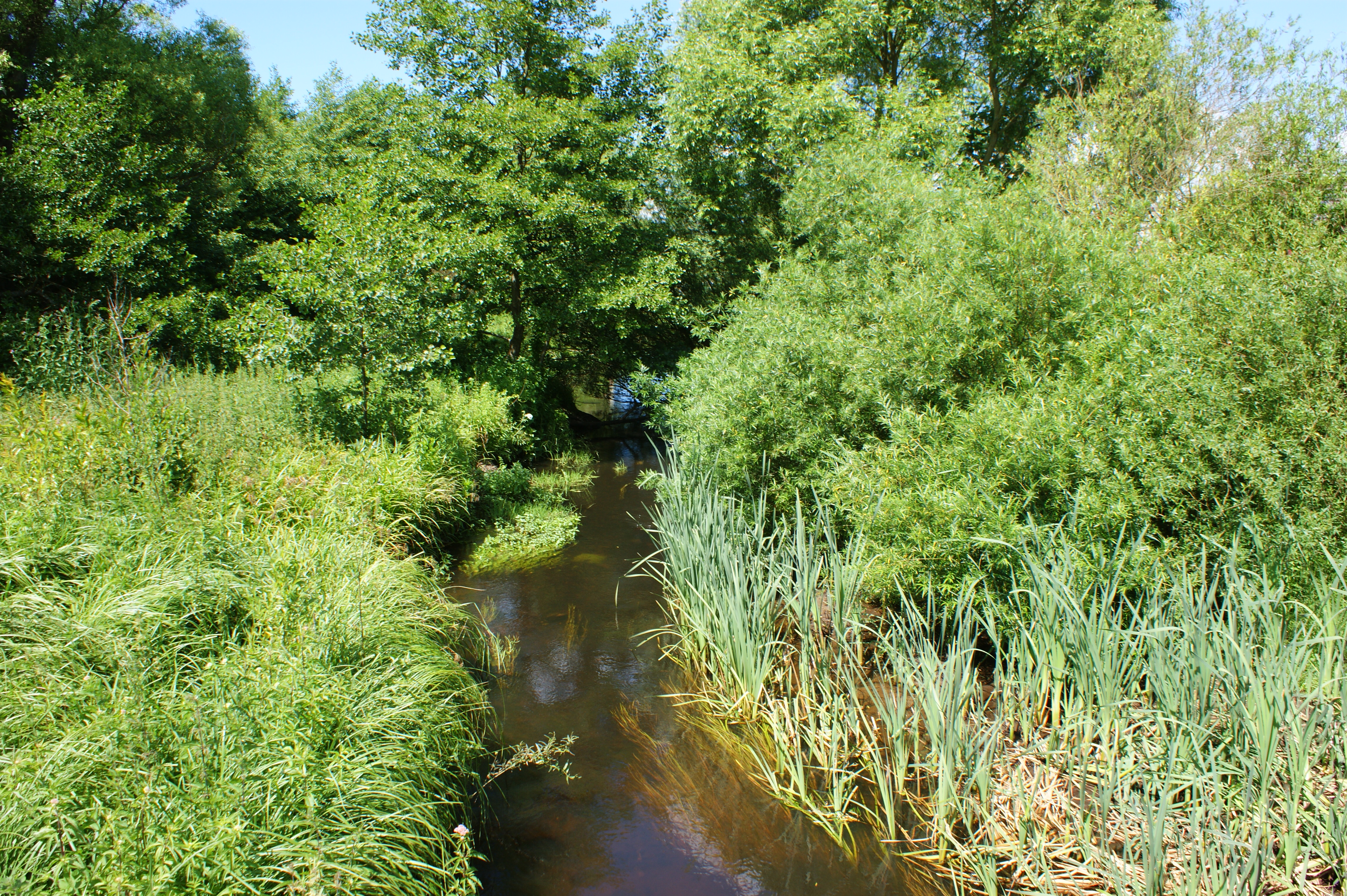

Location
- Country: Poland
- Voivodeship: West Pomeranian

Physical characteristics
- Source
  - location: near Sikorki
  - coordinates: 53°44′1″N 15°6′56″E
- Mouth
  - location: Dziwna
  - coordinates: 53°54′04″N 14°44′28″E

Basin features
- Progression: Grzybnica→Dziwna→ Baltic Sea

Wołczenica is a river in north-western Poland. Near Kamień Pomorski it flows into the Grzybnica, which in turn drains into Quiet Bay (Zatoka Cicha) formed by the Dziwna River.
