= Sikorki =

- Village
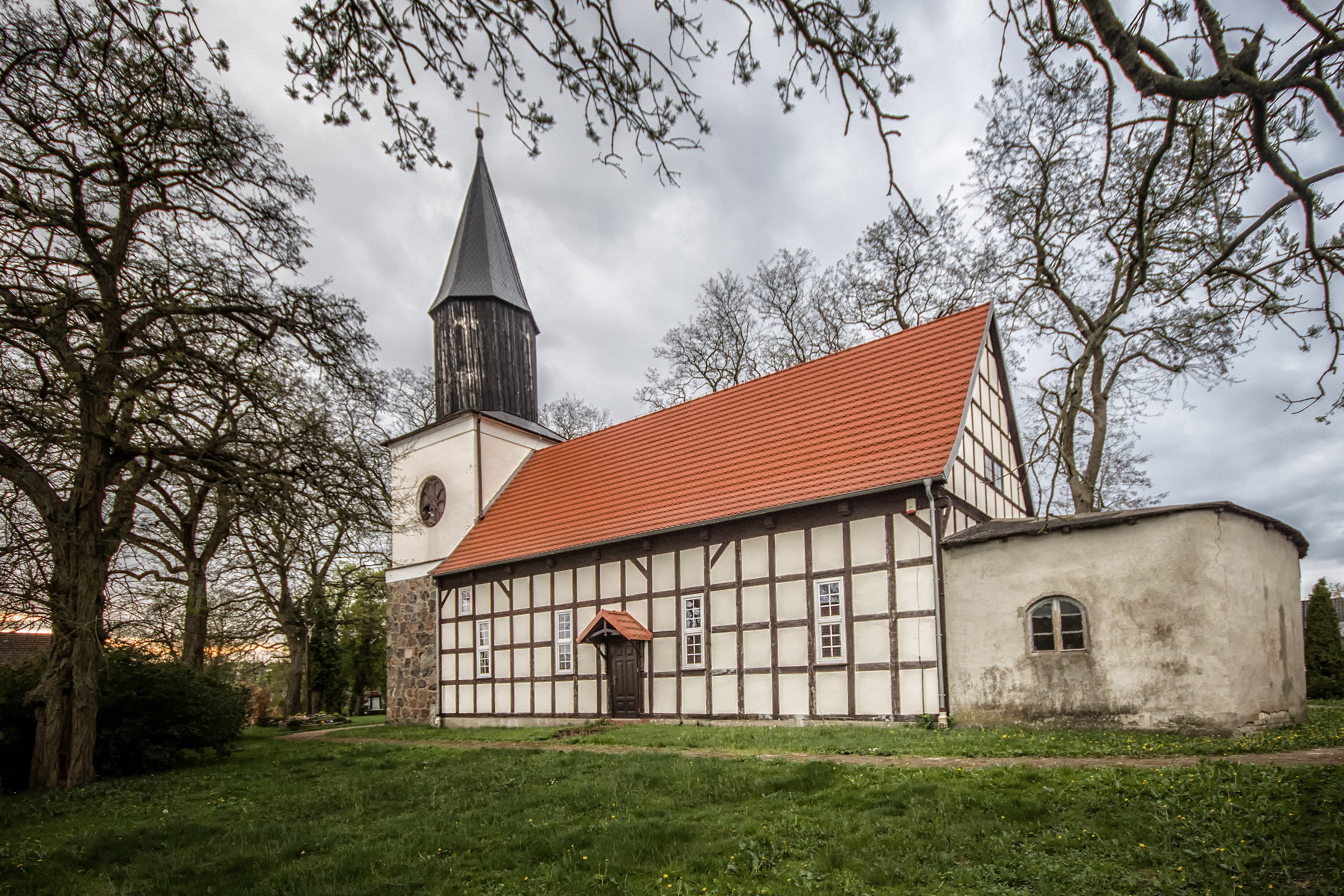
- Christ the King church in Sikorki

- Location within Poland
- Coordinates: 53°45′18″N 15°5′24″E
- Country: Poland
- Voivodeship: West Pomeranian
- County: Goleniów
- Gmina: Nowogard
- Time zone: UTC+1 (CET)
  - Summer (DST): UTC+2 (CEST)
- Vehicle registration: ZGL
- Primary airport: Solidarity Szczecin–Goleniów Airport

Sikorki [ɕiˈkɔrki] (German: Zickerke) is a village in the administrative district of Gmina Nowogard, within Goleniów County, West Pomeranian Voivodeship, in northwestern Poland. It lies approximately 10 km (6 mi) north of Nowogard, 30 km (19 mi) north-east of Goleniów, and 51 km (32 mi) northeast of the regional capital Szczecin. It is located on the Wołczenica river in the historic region of Pomerania.
