= Voivodeship road 449 =

Polish road connecting Syców to Błaszki

Voivodeship Road 449
- Droga wojewódzka nr 449

Route information
- Length: 70 km (43 mi)

Location
- Country: Poland
- Regions: Lower Silesian Voivodeship, Greater Poland Voivodeship, Łódź Voivodeship
- Major cities: Syców, Grabów nad Prosną, Błaszki

Highway system
- National roads in Poland; Voivodeship roads
← DW 448	→ DW 450

Voivodeship road 449 (Polish: Droga wojewódzka nr 449, abbreviated DW449) is a route in the Polish voivodeship roads network. It connects Syców with Błaszki and national road 12.

== Villages and towns along the route ==
- Słupia pod Bralinem (S8)
- Syców (DW448)
- Pisarzowice
- Mąkoszyce
- Ligota
- Kobyla Góra
- Bierzów
- Rojów
- Ostrzeszów (DK11)
- Bukownica
- Książenice
- Grabów nad Prosną (DW447, DW450)
- Pataty
- Giżyce
- Ostrów Kaliski
- Brzeziny
- Piegonisko-Pustkowie
- Sobiesęki
- Brończyn
- Błaszki (DK12)
