= Klon =

Klon may refer to:

- Klon, Greater Poland Voivodeship, a village in Gmina Czajków, Ostrzeszów County, Greater Poland Voivodeship, Poland
- Klon, Szczytno County, a village in Gmina Rozogi, Szczytno County, Warmian-Masurian Voivodeship, Poland
- Klon (poetry), a form of Lao and Thai poetry
- Kelon language, a Papuan language spoken on Alor Island, East Nusa Tenggara, Indonesia
- Klon Centaur, a guitar overdrive pedal
- Tomasz Klon (born 1986), German politician
