= Joel Agee =

American writer and translator

- Born: 20 March 1940 (age 86)
- Citizenship: American

Joel Agee (born 20 March 1940 in New York City) is an American writer and translator. He lives in New York.

== Early life ==
Joel Agee is the son of the American author James Agee. After his parents divorced in 1941, he and his mother Alma Agee, née Mailman, went to live in Mexico where she met and married the expatriate German novelist Bodo Uhse. Agee's half-brother Stefan Uhse, born in Mexico in 1946, took his own life in 1973 in New York City. In 1948 the family moved to the Soviet sector of Berlin, where Uhse became editor in chief of the cultural magazine Aufbau, a member of the GDR-Volkskammer, and later chairman of the East German writers association. When her marriage failed in 1960, Alma Uhse relocated with her sons back to the United States.

Joel Agee grew up in a literary family, and at an early age was determined to become a writer. Having various times dropped out of school, he was to a certain degree self-educated. He married Susan Lemansky in 1966 and their daughter Gina was born in 1967. A small inheritance enabled him to travel around Europe for two and a half years with his wife and daughter in search of kindred souls interested in founding a commune. During this period, the late 1960s and early 1970s, he was drawn to Buddhism and used drugs, notably LSD. Briefly, before returning to the US, he spent time in an English prison for drug possession. Many of these experiences are recounted in his memoir In the House of My Fear.

== Career ==
Joel Agee began freelancing in the 1970s, and his essays began appearing in such prestigious magazines as The New Yorker. In 1980 he became a staff writer for Harper's Magazine and in the following year he was named fiction editor. He wrote the memoir Twelve Years – An American Boyhood in East Germany (1981), followed by In the House of My Fear (2004). He has translated works by Heinrich von Kleist, Friedrich Dürrenmatt, Elias Canetti, Rainer Maria Rilke, Gottfried Benn, Hans Erich Nossack, Jürg Federspiel, Aeschylus and others. He has contributed essays, stories, travel pieces and book reviews to The New Yorker, Harper's, The New York Times Book Review, and other national publications. In 2022 Melville House Books published Agee's first work of fiction, the novel The Stone World.

== Works ==
=== Fiction ===
- The Stone World. Melville House Books, Brooklyn, 2022.

=== Memoirs ===
- Twelve Years: An American Boyhood in East Germany. Farrar, Straus and Giroux, New York 1981, republished by The University of Chicago Press, 2000.
  - Zwölf Jahre – Eine amerikanische Jugend in Ostdeutschland. Hanser, München, 1982, (translated by Joel Agee and Lola Gruenthal), reprint (with a foreword and text comments) 2009.
- In the House of My Fear. Shoemaker & Hoard, Washington DC 2004.

=== Translations ===
- Robert Musil: Agathe or, The Forgotten Sister. New York Review Books, New York 2019.
- Aeschylus: Prometheus Bound. New York Review Books Classics, New York 2015.
- Elias Canetti: The Secret Heart of the Clock: notes, aphorisms, fragments; 1973–1985. Farrar, Straus and Giroux, 1989.
- Friedrich Dürrenmatt: Selected writings.
  - Volume 1. Plays. University of Chicago Press, Chicago 2006.
  - Volume 2 Fictions. The University of Chicago Press, Chicago 2006.
  - Volume 3: Essays. The University of Chicago Press, Chicago 2006.
- Friedrich Dürrenmatt: The Pledge. Boulevard (Mass Market), 2000.
- Friedrich Dürrenmatt, The Assignment: Or, On the Observing of the Observer of the Observers, Random House, 1988.* Cordelia Edvardson: Burned child seeks the fire: a memoir. Beacon Press, Boston 1997.
- Jürg Federspiel: The ballad of Typhoid Mary. Dutton, New York 1983.
- Heinrich von Kleist: Penthesilea. HarperCollins, New York 2000.
- Hans Erich Nossack: The End. Hamburg 1943, University of Chicago Press, London 2006.
- Rainer Maria Rilke: Letters on Cézanne, Fromm International Publishers, 1982; republished, with corrections and improvements and a translator's foreword, by North Point Press, 2002.
- Rainer Maria Rilke: Rilke and Benvenuta: an intimate correspondence, Fromm International Publishers, 1987.
- Karlo Štajner, Seven Thousand Days in Siberia, Farrar, Straus and Giroux, 1988.

=== Selected essays and articles ===
- "The Calm Before the Storm" (review of Aharon Appelfeld's The Age of Wonders), The New York Times, December 27, 1981.
- "The Rhine Runs Through It", Travel and Leisure Aug. 1998.
- "By a Dead Lake" (review of Elfriede Jelinek's novel Greed), New York Times, April 15, 2007.
- "The Good German" (review of Günter Grass's memoir Peeling the Onion), The Washington Post, July 8, 2007.
- "A lie that tells the truth: Memoir and the art of memory", Harper's Magazine, Nov. 2007.
- "German lessons", archipelago, Volume 7, Number 1.
- "Killing a Turtle", archipelago, Volume 7, Number 1.
- "Foreword: The End, by Hans Erich Nossack", review, archipelago, Volume 8, Number 4.
- "Not found, not lost", Tricycle, Winter 2008.

== Awards ==
- Guggenheim Fellowship and a grant from the National Endowment for the Arts
- DAAD fellowship from the DAAD Artists-in-Berlin Program of the German Academic Exchange Service (1990–91)
- Helen and Kurt Wolff Prize for the translation of Heinrich von Kleist's Penthesilea (1999)
- The Modern Language Association’s Lois Roth Award for the translation of Hans Erich Nossack's Der Untergang (2004)
- The ALTA National Translation Award (2007)
- The Berlin Prize of the American Academy in Berlin (2008)
- Oxford-Weidenfeld Translation Prize finalist (2007)
