= Teofil Cyprian Wolicki =

Polish bishop

His Excellency Teofil Wolicki
- Archdiocese of Gniezno
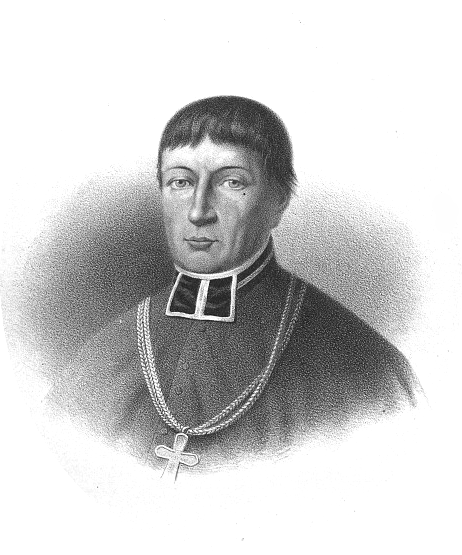
- Church: Roman Catholic
- Archdiocese: Gniezno
- Installed: 1828
- Term ended: 1829

Orders
- Ordination: 1792
- Consecration: 15 May 1829

Personal details
- Born: 20 September 1768 Godziętowy
- Died: 21 December 1829 (aged 61) Poznań
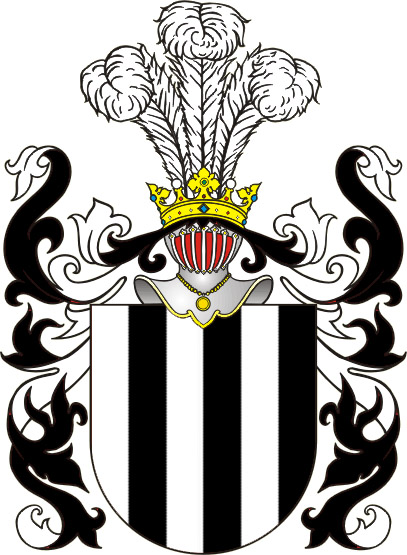
- Coat of arms

Teofil Cyprian Wolicki (1768–1829) was an 18th-century Primate of Poland and Bishop of Poznań and Włocławek.

== Life ==
He was born 30 October 1768 in Doruchów.

He graduated from seminary in Warsaw, and ordained a priest. Then he studied law and theology at the academy of Vilnius and in Rome.

After his return to Poland, he worked in the Office of the Crown Chancellery and a library of Stanisław August Poniatowski, under the direction of Bishop John Baptist Albertrandi.

He became Archbishop of Gniezno on 17 May 1829.

He died December 21, 1829, in Poznań.
