= Theo Harych =

German writer

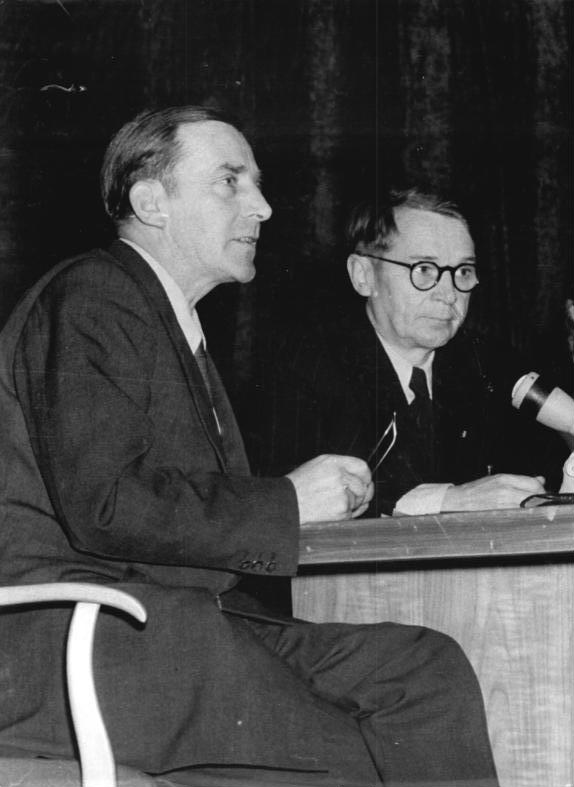
- Bodo Uhse and Theo Harych
- Born: Theo Harych; 19 December 1903; Doruchow, Posen, German Empire
- Died: 22 February 1958 (aged 54); East Berlin, East Germany
- Citizenship: East German
- Occupation: Writer
- Writing career
- Period: 1950s
- Notable awards: Heinrich Mann Prize; 1954

Theo Harych (19 December 1903 – 22 February 1958) was a German writer.

== Life ==
Born in Doruchow, Province of Posen, Theo Harych was the son of a farmer. From 1910 to 1918, he worked as a herder and servant in Silesia. He stopped attending a Volksschule after 1916. He went to Central Germany in 1919 where he worked in a sugar factory and in a coal mine in Mücheln. As a member of the Miner's Labor Union, he participated in the Mitteldeutschen Aufstand (Central German Rebellion) in the Gieseltal (Giesel Valley). He attended a driving and servant school in Halle (Saale), subsequently he was a journeyman in Saxony on the way. He was once employed as a valet to an Adel but lasted just five minutes, on account of his Communist sentiments. He followed with renewed travel and spent time as a driver in Berlin. After a period of unemployment from 1930 to 1936, Harych worked as a locksmith from 1936 to 1944. He drove deliveries with one of his own panel vans. He was drafted to the Wehrmacht in 1944 but fared poorly because of ear problems. He was assigned to "Ear Company" and soon released.

After World War II, he worked again as a valet, in East Berlin. His writing talent was discovered in 1950 and enabled him an existence as a freelance writer. Harych was a member of the Deutscher Schriftstellerverband and received the 1954 Heinrich Mann Prize. He committed suicide in his apartment in Berlin in 1958.

In addition to a children's book, Theo Harych published three novels. Hinter den schwartzen Wäldern (Behind the Black Forests) describes Harych's poor childhood. Themes of In Geiseltal are misery and rebellion in the Central German coal mines until the insurrection of 1921. The third novel, Im Namen des Volkes (In the Name of the People), is a documentary of miscarriage of justice befalling Polish farm worker Jakubowski in the 1920s. He also wrote an unpublished manuscript of a socialist realist novel Stalinallee in 1952. The novel was commissioned by the National Building Program for Germany's Capital (German: Nationales Aufbauprogramm der Haupstadt Deutschlands). The manuscript is now held at the Akademie der Künste in Berlin.

== Works ==
- Hinter den schwarzen Wäldern (Behind the Black Forests), Berlin 1951
- Bärbels und Lothars schönster Tag (Bärbel and Lothar's Beautiful Day), Berlin 1952
- Im Geiseltal (In Geisel Valley), Berlin 1952
- Im Namen des Volkes? (In the Name of the People), Berlin 1958

== Literature ==
Serke, J.: Zu Hause im Exil (To the House in Exile). München, Zürich 1998
