= Myślniew =

- Village
- Location within Poland
- Coordinates: 51°24′4″N 17°48′26″E
- Country: Poland
- Voivodeship: Greater Poland
- County: Ostrzeszów
- Gmina: Kobyla Góra
- Population: 360

Myślniew [ˈmɨɕlɲɛf] is a village in the administrative district of Gmina Kobyla Góra, within Ostrzeszów County, Greater Poland Voivodeship, in west-central Poland. Myślniew has a population of 360 and lies approximately 4 kilometres (2 mi) north-west of Kobyla Góra, 14 km (9 mi) west of Ostrzeszów, and 127 km (79 mi) south-east of the regional capital Poznań.
