= Olszyna (disambiguation) =

Olszyna (meaning "alder wood") is a town in Lower Silesian Voivodeship in south-west Poland. it can also refer to:

== Places ==
- Olszyna, Lubusz Voivodeship (west Poland)
- Olszyna, Podlaskie Voivodeship (north-east Poland)
- Olszyna, Silesian Voivodeship (south Poland)
- Olszyna, Greater Poland Voivodeship (west-central Poland)
  - Olszyna, Oborniki County (north-central Greater Poland)
  - Olszyna, Ostrzeszów County in Greater Poland Voivodeship (south Greater Poland)
- Olszyna, Świętokrzyskie Voivodeship (south-central Poland)
- Olszyna, Oborniki County in Greater Poland Voivodeship (west-central Poland)
- Olszyna, West Pomeranian Voivodeship (north-west Poland)
- Stara Olszyna
- Truskolasy-Olszyna

== People ==
- Eugeniusz Olszyna, Polish footballer

== See also ==
- Olszyny
