= Korpysy =

- Village
- Location within Poland
- Coordinates: 51°29′27″N 17°56′23″E
- Country: Poland
- Voivodeship: Greater Poland
- County: Ostrzeszów
- Gmina: Ostrzeszów

Korpysy [kɔrˈpɨsɨ] is a village in the administrative district of Gmina Ostrzeszów, within Ostrzeszów County, Greater Poland Voivodeship, in west-central Poland.

From 1815 to 1918 and then again from 1939 to 1945 Korpysy had a German name Ottosberg.
