= Kuźnica Myślniewska =

- Village
- Location within Poland
- Coordinates: 51°23′53″N 17°47′18″E
- Country: Poland
- Voivodeship: Greater Poland
- County: Ostrzeszów
- Gmina: Kobyla Góra

Kuźnica Myślniewska (Polish pronunciation: [kuʑˈɲit͡sa mɨɕlˈɲɛfska]) is a village in the administrative district of Gmina Kobyla Góra, within Ostrzeszów County, Greater Poland Voivodeship, in west-central Poland.
