= Jelenie =

Jelenie may refer to the following places:

- Jelenie, Greater Poland Voivodeship (west-central Poland)
- Jelenie, Masovian Voivodeship (east-central Poland)
- Jelenie, West Pomeranian Voivodeship (north-west Poland)
