= Renta, Greater Poland Voivodeship =

Renta
- Village
- Location within Poland
- Coordinates: 51°31′N 18°12′E
- Country: Poland
- Voivodeship: Greater Poland
- County: Ostrzeszów
- Gmina: Kraszewice

Renta [ˈrɛnta] is a village in the administrative district of Gmina Kraszewice, within Ostrzeszów County, Greater Poland Voivodeship, in west-central Poland.
