= Dębicze =

- Village
- Location within Poland
- Coordinates: 51°28′N 18°11′E
- Country: Poland
- Voivodeship: Greater Poland
- County: Ostrzeszów
- Gmina: Grabów nad Prosną

Dębicze [dɛmˈbit͡ʂɛ] is a village in the administrative district of Gmina Grabów nad Prosną, within Ostrzeszów County, Greater Poland Voivodeship, in west-central Poland.
