= Kotowskie =

- Village
- Location within Poland
- Coordinates: 51°28′59″N 17°45′51″E
- Country: Poland
- Voivodeship: Greater Poland
- County: Ostrzeszów
- Gmina: Ostrzeszów

Kotowskie [kɔˈtɔfskʲɛ] is a village in the administrative district of Gmina Ostrzeszów, within Ostrzeszów County, Greater Poland Voivodeship, in west-central Poland.
