= Mij =

Mij may refer to:

== Places ==
- Mij, Fars, Iran
- Mij, Kerman, Iran
- Mij, Mazandaran, Iran

=== Facilities and structures ===
- Mili Airport, Mili Atoll, Marshall Islands (IATA airport code MIJ)
- Majhdia railway station, Majhdia, Krishnaganj, Nadia, West Bengal, India (station code MIJ)
- Mitcham Junction station, Merton, London, England, UK (station code MIJ)

== People ==
- Hieronymus van der Mij (1687–1761), Dutch portrait painter
- Jim Holmberg, American singer-songwriter who recorded under the name "Mij"
- James Cameron (born 1954), Canadian-American film director, nicknamed "Mij" on film sets and in industry circles

== Other uses ==
- Mungbam language, spoken in Cameroon (ISO 639 language code mij)
- MIJ, a Japanese companies that manufactures licensed Lakland guitars
- "Mij", an Iraqi otter featured in the book Ring of Bright Water

== See also ==
- Mije (disambiguation)
- Mige (disambiguation)
- Midge (disambiguation)
