= Jaźwiny, Ostrzeszów County =

Jaźwiny
- Village
- Location within Poland
- Coordinates: 51°29′45″N 18°10′39″E
- Country: Poland
- Voivodeship: Greater Poland
- County: Ostrzeszów
- Gmina: Kraszewice

Jaźwiny [jaʑˈvinɨ] is a village in the administrative district of Gmina Kraszewice, within Ostrzeszów County, Greater Poland Voivodeship, in west-central Poland.
