= Rogaszyce, Ostrzeszów County =

Rogaszyce
- Village
- Location within Poland
- Coordinates: 51°23′N 17°57′E
- Country: Poland
- Voivodeship: Greater Poland
- County: Ostrzeszów
- Gmina: Ostrzeszów
- Highest elevation: 250 m (820 ft)
- Lowest elevation: 200 m (660 ft)

Rogaszyce [rɔɡaˈʂɨt͡sɛ] is a village in the administrative district of Gmina Ostrzeszów, within Ostrzeszów County, Greater Poland Voivodeship, in west-central Poland.
