= Pieczyska, Ostrzeszów County =

Pieczyska
- Village
- Location within Poland
- Coordinates: 51°25′11″N 17°59′25″E
- Country: Poland
- Voivodeship: Greater Poland
- County: Ostrzeszów
- Gmina: Doruchów

Pieczyska [pjɛˈt͡ʂɨska] is a village in the administrative district of Gmina Doruchów, within Ostrzeszów County, Greater Poland Voivodeship, in west-central Poland.
