= Stara Kuźnica, Greater Poland Voivodeship =

Stara Kuźnica
- Village
- Location within Poland
- Coordinates: 51°26′8″N 18°5′38″E
- Country: Poland
- Voivodeship: Greater Poland
- County: Ostrzeszów
- Gmina: Doruchów

Stara Kuźnica (Polish pronunciation: [ˈstara kuʑˈɲit͡sa]) is a village in the administrative district of Gmina Doruchów, within Ostrzeszów County, Greater Poland Voivodeship, in west-central Poland.
