= Chlewo, Greater Poland Voivodeship =

Chlewo
- Village
- Location within Poland
- Coordinates: 51°29′31″N 18°2′36″E
- Country: Poland
- Voivodeship: Greater Poland
- County: Ostrzeszów
- Gmina: Grabów nad Prosną
- Population: 364

Chlewo [ˈxlɛvɔ] is a village in the administrative district of Gmina Grabów nad Prosną, within Ostrzeszów County, Greater Poland Voivodeship, in west-central Poland.
