= Skarydzew =

- Village
- Location within Poland
- Coordinates: 51°26′N 18°10′E
- Country: Poland
- Voivodeship: Greater Poland
- County: Ostrzeszów
- Gmina: Doruchów

Skarydzew [skaˈrɨd͡zɛf] is a village in the administrative district of Gmina Doruchów, within Ostrzeszów County, Greater Poland Voivodeship, in west-central Poland. Temperatures range from an average high of 75 °F in July to an average low of 23 °F in January.
