= Gmina Ostrzeszów =

Gmina Ostrzeszów Ostrzeszów Commune
- Gmina
- Coat of arms
- Interactive map of Gmina Ostrzeszów
- Coordinates (Ostrzeszów): 51°25′30″N 17°55′47″E
- Country: Poland
- Voivodeship: Greater Poland
- County: Ostrzeszów
- Seat: Ostrzeszów

Area
  - Total: 187.49 km^{2} (72.39 sq mi)

Population (2023)
  - Total: 24,212
  - Density: 129.14/km^{2} (334.46/sq mi)
  - Urban: 14,095
  - Rural: 10,117
- Website: http://www.ostrzeszow.pl/

Gmina Ostrzeszów is an urban-rural gmina (administrative district) in Ostrzeszów County, Greater Poland Voivodeship, in west-central Poland. Its seat is the town of Ostrzeszów, which lies approximately 134 kilometres (83 mi) south-east of the regional capital Poznań.

The gmina covers an area of 187.49 square kilometres (72.4 sq mi), and as of 2023 its total population is 24,212 (out of which the population of Ostrzeszów amounts to 14,095, and the population of the rural part of the gmina is 10,117).

== Villages ==
Apart from the town of Ostrzeszów, Gmina Ostrzeszów contains the villages and settlements of Bledzianów, Jesiona, Kochłowy, Korpysy, Kotowskie, Kozły, Królewskie, Kuźniki, Marydół, Myje, Niedźwiedź, Olszyna, Ostrzeszów-Pustkowie, Potaśnia, Rejmanka, Rogaszyce, Rojów, Siedlików, Szklarka Myślniewska, Szklarka Przygodzicka, Turze and Zajączki.

== Neighbouring gminas ==
Gmina Ostrzeszów is bordered by the gminas of Doruchów, Grabów nad Prosną, Kępno, Kobyla Góra, Mikstat, Przygodzice and Sośnie.
