= Mostki, Ostrzeszów County =

Mostki
- Village
- Location within Poland
- Coordinates: 51°22′11″N 17°53′17″E
- Country: Poland
- Voivodeship: Greater Poland
- County: Ostrzeszów
- Gmina: Kobyla Góra
- Population: 50

Mostki [ˈmɔstki] is a village in the administrative district of Gmina Kobyla Góra, within Ostrzeszów County, Greater Poland Voivodeship, in west-central Poland.
