= Kuźnica Grabowska =

- Village
- Location within Poland
- Coordinates: 51°30′13″N 18°16′5″E
- Country: Poland
- Voivodeship: Greater Poland
- County: Ostrzeszów
- Gmina: Kraszewice
- Population: 544

Kuźnica Grabowska (Polish pronunciation: [kuʑˈɲit͡sa ɡraˈbɔfska]) is a village in the administrative district of Gmina Kraszewice, within Ostrzeszów County, Greater Poland Voivodeship, in west-central Poland.
