= Zmyślona Parzynowska =

- Village
- Location within Poland
- Coordinates: 51°21′22″N 17°52′24″E
- Country: Poland
- Voivodeship: Greater Poland
- County: Ostrzeszów
- Gmina: Kobyla Góra

Zmyślona Parzynowska [zmɨˈɕlɔna paʐɨˈnɔfska] is a village in the administrative district of Gmina Kobyla Góra, within Ostrzeszów County, Greater Poland Voivodeship, in west-central Poland.
