= Zadki =

- Village
- Location within Poland
- Coordinates: 51°27′34″N 18°16′26″E
- Country: Poland
- Voivodeship: Greater Poland
- County: Ostrzeszów
- Gmina: Czajków

Zadki [ˈzatki] is a village in the administrative district of Gmina Czajków, within Ostrzeszów County, Greater Poland Voivodeship, in west-central Poland.
