= Gruszków =

Gruszków may refer to the following places in Poland:

- Gruszków, Lower Silesian Voivodeship (south-west Poland)
- Gruszków, Greater Poland Voivodeship (west-central Poland)
