= Wrzosy, Greater Poland Voivodeship =

Wrzosy
- Village
- Location within Poland
- Coordinates: 51°25′18″N 18°6′19″E
- Country: Poland
- Voivodeship: Greater Poland
- County: Ostrzeszów
- Gmina: Doruchów

Wrzosy [ˈvʐɔsɨ] is a village in the administrative district of Gmina Doruchów, within Ostrzeszów County, Greater Poland Voivodeship, in west-central Poland.
