= Mączniki, Ostrzeszów County =

Mączniki
- Village
- Location within Poland
- Coordinates: 51°31′59″N 18°11′34″E
- Country: Poland
- Voivodeship: Greater Poland
- County: Ostrzeszów
- Gmina: Kraszewice

Mączniki [mɔnt͡ʂˈniki] is a village in the administrative district of Gmina Kraszewice, within Ostrzeszów County, Greater Poland Voivodeship, in west-central Poland.
