= Wygoda Tokarska =

- Village
- Location within Poland
- Coordinates: 51°24′39″N 17°59′15″E
- Country: Poland
- Voivodeship: Greater Poland
- County: Ostrzeszów
- Gmina: Doruchów

Wygoda Tokarska [vɨˈɡɔda tɔˈkarska] is a village in the administrative district of Gmina Doruchów, within Ostrzeszów County, Greater Poland Voivodeship, in west-central Poland.
