= Rejmanka =

- Village
- Location within Poland
- Coordinates: 51°27′42″N 17°56′52″E
- Country: Poland
- Voivodeship: Greater Poland
- County: Ostrzeszów
- Gmina: Ostrzeszów

Rejmanka [rɛi̯ˈmanka] is a village in the administrative district of Gmina Ostrzeszów, within Ostrzeszów County, Greater Poland Voivodeship, in west-central Poland.
