= Andrzej Grzyb =

Polish politician (born 1956)

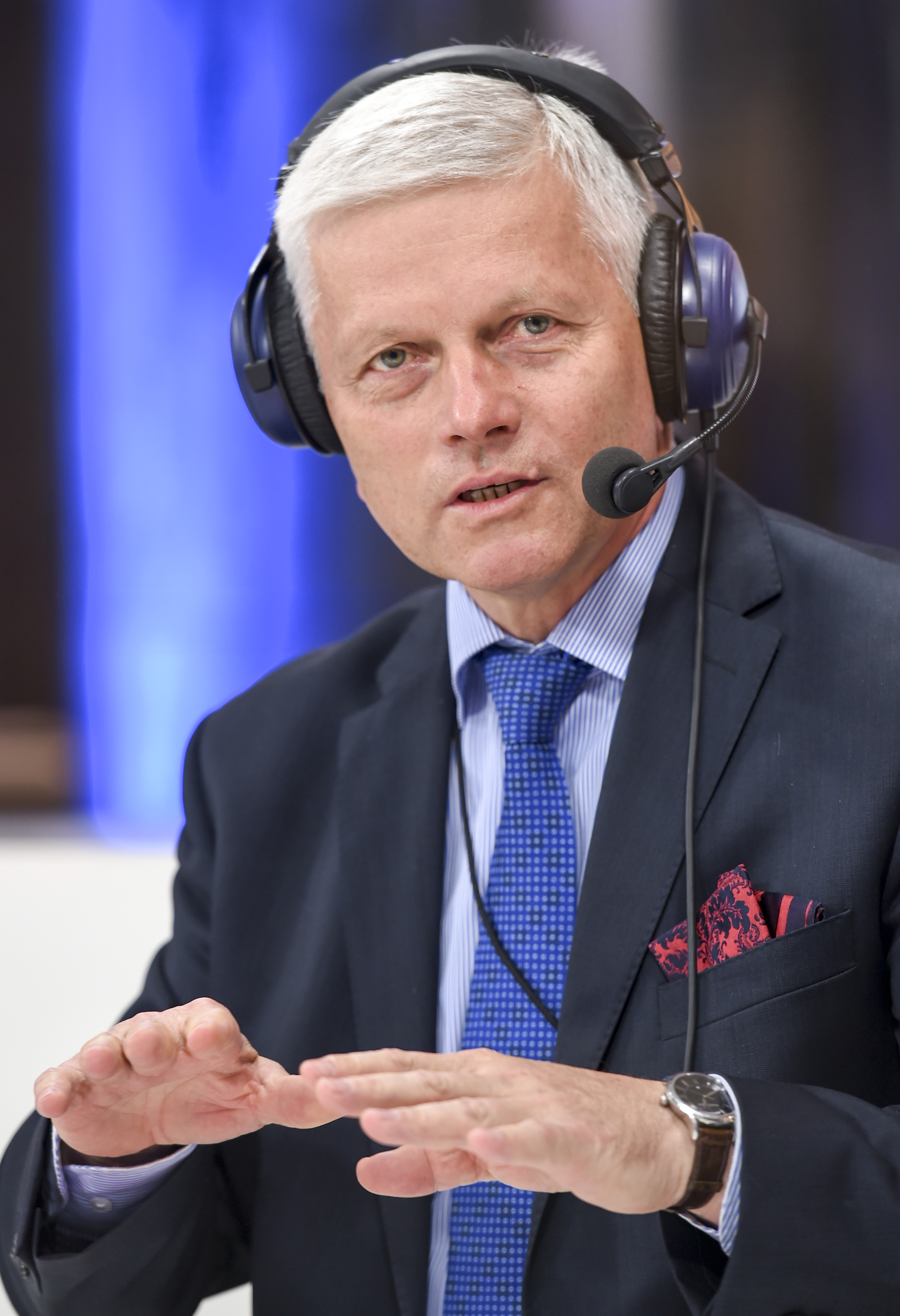

Member of Sejm
- Incumbent
- Assumed office 25 September 2005

Personal details
- Born: 23 August 1956 (age 69) Siedlików
- Party: Polish People's Party

Andrzej Marian Grzyb (born 23 August 1956 in Siedlików) is a Polish politician who served as a Member of the European Parliament from 2003 until 2004 and from 2009 until 2019. He was elected to Sejm on 25 September 2005, getting 7,986 votes in 36 Kalisz district as a candidate from the Polish People's Party list.

From 2014 until 2019, Grzyb was a member of the European Parliament's Democracy Support and Election Coordination Group (DEG), which oversees the Parliament's election observation missions.

He was also a member of People's Republic of Poland Sejm 1989–1991, Sejm 1993–1997, and Sejm 2001–2005.

== See also ==
- Members of Polish Sejm 2005–2007
