= Racławice, Greater Poland Voivodeship =

Racławice
- Village
- Location within Poland
- Coordinates: 51°30′49″N 18°10′24″E
- Country: Poland
- Voivodeship: Greater Poland
- County: Ostrzeszów
- Gmina: Kraszewice
- Time zone: UTC+1 (CET)
  - Summer (DST): UTC+2 (CEST)
- Vehicle registration: POT

Racławice [rat͡swaˈvit͡sɛ] is a village in the administrative district of Gmina Kraszewice, within Ostrzeszów County, Greater Poland Voivodeship, in west-central Poland.

== History ==
During the German occupation of Poland (World War II), ten Polish farmers from Racławice were murdered by the occupiers on 11 February 1940, in nearby Winiary (present-day district of Kalisz) at the site of large massacres of Poles from the region perpetrated in 1939–1940 as part of the Intelligenzaktion.
