= Mije =

Mije may refer to:

- Mije people, an ethnic group of Mexico
- Mije languages, the languages spoken by them
- Mije (wrestler) (born 1969), Mexican wrestler
- Antonio Mije (1905–1976), Spanish politician
- Käty van der Mije-Nicolau (1940–2013), Dutch-Romanian chess player
- Mijê, a village in Dohuk Governorate, Iraq

== See also ==
- Myje, Ostrzeszów, Ostrzeszów, Greater Poland, Poland
- Mij (disambiguation)
- Miji (disambiguation)
- Midge (disambiguation)
- Mige (disambiguation)
