= Rudniczysko =

- Village
- Location within Poland
- Coordinates: 51°23′34″N 18°3′2″E
- Country: Poland
- Voivodeship: Greater Poland
- County: Ostrzeszów
- Gmina: Doruchów

Rudniczysko [rudniˈt͡ʂɨskɔ] is a village in the administrative district of Gmina Doruchów, within Ostrzeszów County, Greater Poland Voivodeship, in west-central Poland.
