= Zawady, Ostrzeszów County =

Zawady
- Village
- Location within Poland
- Coordinates: 51°29′13″N 18°8′59″E
- Country: Poland
- Voivodeship: Greater Poland
- County: Ostrzeszów
- Gmina: Grabów nad Prosną
- Population: 100

Zawady [zaˈvadɨ] is a village in the administrative district of Gmina Grabów nad Prosną, within Ostrzeszów County, Greater Poland Voivodeship, in west-central Poland.
