= Grabów-Wójtostwo =

- Village
- Location within Poland
- Coordinates: 51°31′15″N 18°5′19″E
- Country: Poland
- Voivodeship: Greater Poland
- County: Ostrzeszów
- Gmina: Grabów nad Prosną

Grabów-Wójtostwo [ˈɡrabuf vui̯ˈtɔstfɔ] is a village in the administrative district of Gmina Grabów nad Prosną, within Ostrzeszów County, Greater Poland Voivodeship, in west-central Poland.
