= Siekierzyn, Ostrzeszów County =

Siekierzyn
- Village
- Location within Poland
- Coordinates: 51°28′N 18°7′E
- Country: Poland
- Voivodeship: Greater Poland
- County: Ostrzeszów
- Gmina: Grabów nad Prosną
- Population: 200

Siekierzyn [ɕɛˈkʲɛʐɨn] is a village in the administrative district of Gmina Grabów nad Prosną, within Ostrzeszów County, Greater Poland Voivodeship, in west-central Poland.
