= Ostrzeszów-Pustkowie =

- Village
- Location within Poland
- Coordinates: 51°24′44″N 17°57′45″E
- Country: Poland
- Voivodeship: Greater Poland
- County: Ostrzeszów
- Gmina: Ostrzeszów

Ostrzeszów-Pustkowie [ɔsˈtʂɛʂuf pustˈkɔvjɛ] is a village in the administrative district of Gmina Ostrzeszów, within Ostrzeszów County, Greater Poland Voivodeship, in west-central Poland.
