= Głuszyna =

Głuszyna may refer to the following places:

- Głuszyna, part of the Nowe Miasto district of Poznań
- Głuszyna, Greater Poland Voivodeship (west-central Poland)
- Głuszyna, Masovian Voivodeship (east-central Poland)
- Głuszyna, Opole Voivodeship (south-west Poland)
- Głuszyna, West Pomeranian Voivodeship (north-west Poland)
