= Michałów, Ostrzeszów County =

Michałów
- Village
- Location within Poland
- Coordinates: 51°26′55″N 18°17′59″E
- Country: Poland
- Voivodeship: Greater Poland
- County: Ostrzeszów
- Gmina: Czajków

Michałów [miˈxawuf] is a village in the administrative district of Gmina Czajków, within Ostrzeszów County, Greater Poland Voivodeship, in west-central Poland.
