= Marcinki =

- Village
- Location within Poland
- Coordinates: 51°21′2″N 17°50′45″E
- Country: Poland
- Voivodeship: Greater Poland
- County: Ostrzeszów
- Gmina: Kobyla Góra

Marcinki [marˈt͡ɕinki] is a village in the administrative district of Gmina Kobyla Góra, within Ostrzeszów County, Greater Poland Voivodeship, in west-central Poland.
