= Królewskie =

Królewskie (Polish for "royal") may refer to:

- Królewskie, a brand of beer produced by Warka Brewery, a subsidiary of the Grupa Zywiec S.A.
- Królewskie, Ostrzeszów County, a village in west-central Poland
