= Grabów-Pustkowie =

- Village
- Location within Poland
- Coordinates: 51°30′40″N 18°4′42″E
- Country: Poland
- Voivodeship: Greater Poland
- County: Ostrzeszów
- Gmina: Grabów nad Prosną

Grabów-Pustkowie [ˈɡrabuf pustˈkɔvjɛ] is a village in the administrative district of Gmina Grabów nad Prosną, within Ostrzeszów County, Greater Poland Voivodeship, in west-central Poland.
