= Zalesie, Ostrzeszów County =

Zalesie
- Village
- Location within Poland
- Coordinates: 51°24′24″N 18°5′19″E
- Country: Poland
- Voivodeship: Greater Poland
- County: Ostrzeszów
- Gmina: Doruchów

Zalesie [zaˈlɛɕɛ] is a village in the administrative district of Gmina Doruchów, within Ostrzeszów County, Greater Poland Voivodeship, in west-central Poland.
