= Szklarka Myślniewska =

- Village
- Location within Poland
- Coordinates: 51°27′N 17°49′E
- Country: Poland
- Voivodeship: Greater Poland
- County: Ostrzeszów
- Gmina: Ostrzeszów

Szklarka Myślniewska [ˈʂklarka mɨɕlˈɲɛfska] is a village in the administrative district of Gmina Ostrzeszów, within Ostrzeszów County, Greater Poland Voivodeship, in west-central Poland.
