= Salamony, Greater Poland Voivodeship =

Salamony
- Village
- Location within Poland
- Coordinates: 51°30′N 18°22′E
- Country: Poland
- Voivodeship: Greater Poland
- County: Ostrzeszów
- Gmina: Czajków

Salamony [salaˈmɔnɨ] is a village in the administrative district of Gmina Czajków, within Ostrzeszów County, Greater Poland Voivodeship, in west-central Poland.
