= Kuźniki =

Kuźniki may refer to the following places in Poland:

- Kuźniki, Wrocław, a district of Wrocław
- Kuźniki, Kuyavian-Pomeranian Voivodeship, a village within Toruń County
- Kuźniki, Greater Poland Voivodeship, a village within Ostrzeszów County
