= Turze =

Turze may refer to the following places:

- Turze, Greater Poland Voivodeship (west-central Poland)
- Turze, Masovian Voivodeship (east-central Poland)
- Turze, Silesian Voivodeship (south Poland)
- Turze, Pomeranian Voivodeship (north Poland)
- Turze, Drawsko County in West Pomeranian Voivodeship (north-west Poland)
- Turze, Myślibórz County in West Pomeranian Voivodeship (north-west Poland)
- Turze, Pyrzyce County in West Pomeranian Voivodeship (north-west Poland)
