= Plugawice =

- Village
- Location within Poland
- Coordinates: 51°24′34″N 18°11′32″E
- Country: Poland
- Voivodeship: Greater Poland
- County: Ostrzeszów
- Gmina: Doruchów

Plugawice [pluɡaˈvit͡sɛ] is a village in the administrative district of Gmina Doruchów, within Ostrzeszów County, Greater Poland Voivodeship, in west-central Poland.
