= Jesiona, Greater Poland Voivodeship =

Jesiona
- Village
- Location within Poland
- Coordinates: 51°27′49″N 17°47′56″E
- Country: Poland
- Voivodeship: Greater Poland
- County: Ostrzeszów
- Gmina: Ostrzeszów

Jesiona [jɛˈɕɔna] is a village in the administrative district of Gmina Ostrzeszów, within Ostrzeszów County, Greater Poland Voivodeship, in west-central Poland.
