= Bledzianów =

- Village
- Location within Poland
- Coordinates: 51°28′N 17°51′E
- Country: Poland
- Voivodeship: Greater Poland
- County: Ostrzeszów
- Gmina: Ostrzeszów

Population
  - Total: 387

Bledzianów [blɛˈd͡ʑanuf] is a village in the administrative district of Gmina Ostrzeszów, within Ostrzeszów County, Greater Poland Voivodeship, in west-central Poland.

In the village there is a prayer chapel dedicated to Our Lady of Sorrows belonging to the parish of St. Anna in Niedźwiedz.
