= Kuźnica Bobrowska =

- Village
- Location within Poland
- Coordinates: 51°28′1″N 18°7′56″E
- Country: Poland
- Voivodeship: Greater Poland
- County: Ostrzeszów
- Gmina: Grabów nad Prosną

Kuźnica Bobrowska (Polish pronunciation: [kuʑˈɲit͡sa bɔˈbrɔfska]) is a village in the administrative district of Gmina Grabów nad Prosną, within Ostrzeszów County, Greater Poland Voivodeship, in west-central Poland.
