= Marszałki =

Marszałki may refer to the following places:

- Marszałki, Greater Poland Voivodeship (west-central Poland)
- Marszałki, Opole Voivodeship (south-west Poland)
- Marszałki, Warmian-Masurian Voivodeship (north Poland)
