= Zajączki, Ostrzeszów County =

Zajączki
- Village
- Location within Poland
- Coordinates: 51°27′13″N 17°58′31″E
- Country: Poland
- Voivodeship: Greater Poland
- County: Ostrzeszów
- Gmina: Ostrzeszów

Zajączki [zaˈjɔnt͡ʂki] is a village in the administrative district of Gmina Ostrzeszów, within Ostrzeszów County, Greater Poland Voivodeship, in west-central Poland.
