= Mikołaj Pomarnacki =

Polish fencer (1934–2022)

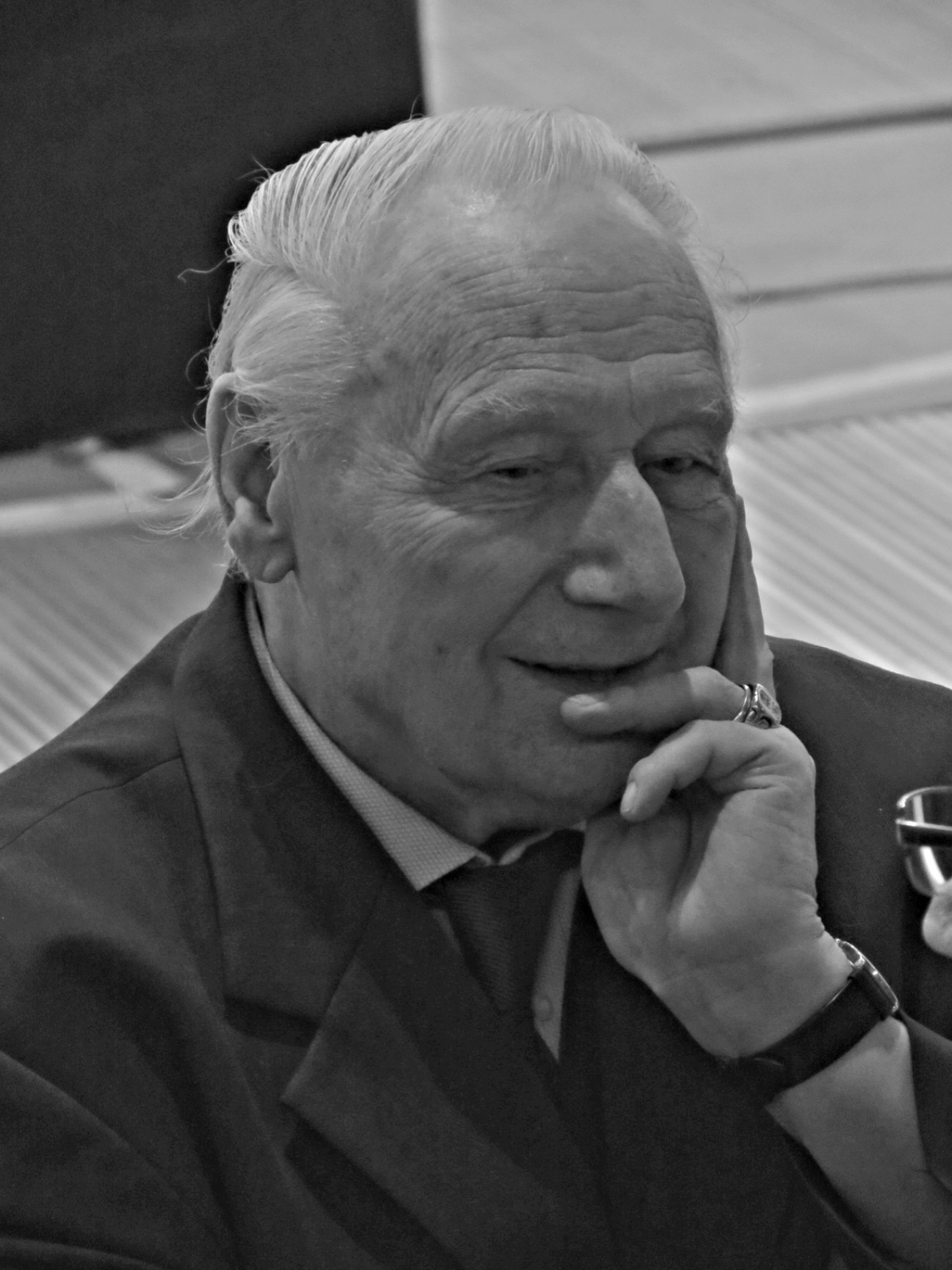

Personal information
- Born: 19 September 1934 Rybin, Poland
- Died: 11 November 2022 (aged 88)

Sport
- Sport: Fencing

Mikołaj Pomarnacki (19 September 1934 – 11 November 2022) was a Polish fencer. He competed in the team épée event at the 1964 Summer Olympics.

He died on 11 November 2022, at the age of 88.
