= Oświęcim, Greater Poland Voivodeship =

Oświęcim
- Village
- Location within Poland
- Coordinates: 51°25′13″N 18°11′39″E
- Country: Poland
- Voivodeship: Greater Poland
- County: Ostrzeszów
- Gmina: Doruchów
- Population: 120

Oświęcim (Polish: [ɔɕˈfjɛɲtɕim]) is a village in the administrative district of Gmina Doruchów, within Ostrzeszów County, Greater Poland Voivodeship, in west-central Poland.
