= Muchy, Greater Poland Voivodeship =

Muchy
- Village
- Location within Poland
- Coordinates: 51°30′48″N 18°20′38″E
- Country: Poland
- Voivodeship: Greater Poland
- County: Ostrzeszów
- Gmina: Czajków

Muchy [ˈmuxɨ] is a village in the administrative district of Gmina Czajków, within Ostrzeszów County, Greater Poland Voivodeship, in west-central Poland.
