= Skrzynki, Ostrzeszów County =

Village in west-central Poland

Skrzynki
- Village
- Location within Poland
- Coordinates: 51°28′38″N 18°8′50″E
- Country: Poland
- Voivodeship: Greater Poland
- County: Ostrzeszów
- Gmina: Grabów nad Prosną

Skrzynki [ˈskʂɨnki] is a village in the administrative district of Gmina Grabów nad Prosną, within Ostrzeszów County, Greater Poland Voivodeship, in west-central Poland.
