= Bobrowniki, Ostrzeszów County =

Bobrowniki
- Village
- Location within Poland
- Coordinates: 51°26′51″N 18°9′0″E
- Country: Poland
- Voivodeship: Greater Poland
- County: Ostrzeszów
- Gmina: Grabów nad Prosną
- Elevation: 136 m (446 ft)
- Website: http://bobrownikinadprosna.pl/

Bobrowniki [bɔbrɔvˈniki] is a village in the administrative district of Gmina Grabów nad Prosną, within Ostrzeszów County, Greater Poland Voivodeship, in west-central Poland.
