= Gruszków, Greater Poland Voivodeship =

Gruszków
- Village
- Location within Poland
- Coordinates: 51°25′8″N 18°7′2″E
- Country: Poland
- Voivodeship: Greater Poland
- County: Ostrzeszów
- Gmina: Doruchów

Gruszków [ˈɡruʂkuf] is a village in the administrative district of Gmina Doruchów, within Ostrzeszów County, Greater Poland Voivodeship, in west-central Poland.
