= Godziętowy =

- Village
- Location within Poland
- Coordinates: 51°25′25″N 18°1′40″E
- Country: Poland
- Voivodeship: Greater Poland
- County: Ostrzeszów
- Gmina: Doruchów

Godziętowy [ɡɔd͡ʑɛnˈtɔvɨ] is a village in the administrative district of Gmina Doruchów, within Ostrzeszów County, Greater Poland Voivodeship, in west-central Poland.
