= Bierzów, Greater Poland Voivodeship =

Bierzów
- Village
- Location within Poland
- Coordinates: 51°24′6″N 17°50′42″E
- Country: Poland
- Voivodeship: Greater Poland
- County: Ostrzeszów
- Gmina: Kobyla Góra

Bierzów [ˈbjɛʐuf] is a village in the administrative district of Gmina Kobyla Góra, within Ostrzeszów County, Greater Poland Voivodeship, in west-central Poland.
