= Gmina Kobyla Góra =

Gmina Kobyla Góra Kobyla Góra Commune
- Gmina
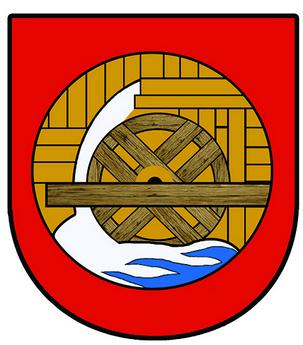
- Flag Coat of arms
- Interactive map of Gmina Kobyla Góra
- Coordinates (Kobyla Góra): 51°22′46″N 17°50′16″E
- Country: Poland
- Voivodeship: Greater Poland
- County: Ostrzeszów
- Seat: Kobyla Góra

Area
  - Total: 128.95 km^{2} (49.79 sq mi)

Population (2006)
  - Total: 5,779
  - Density: 44.82/km^{2} (116.1/sq mi)
- Website: http://www.ug-kobylagora.webpark.pl/

Gmina Kobyla Góra is a rural gmina (administrative district) in Ostrzeszów County, Greater Poland Voivodeship, in west-central Poland. Its seat is the village of Kobyla Góra, which lies approximately 12 kilometres (7 mi) west of Ostrzeszów and 130 km (81 mi) south-east of the regional capital Poznań.

The gmina covers an area of 128.95 square kilometres (49.8 sq mi), and as of 2006 its total population is 5,779.

== Villages ==
Gmina Kobyla Góra contains the villages and settlements of Bałdowice, Bierzów, Ignaców, Kobyla Góra, Kuźnica Myślniewska, Ligota, Mąkoszyce, Marcinki, Mostki, Myślniew, Parzynów, Pisarzowice, Rybin, Zmyślona Ligocka and Zmyślona Parzynowska.

== Neighbouring gminas ==
Gmina Kobyla Góra is bordered by the gminas of Bralin, Kępno, Międzybórz, Ostrzeszów, Perzów, Sośnie and Syców.
