= Tomasz Klon =

German politician (born 1986)

Member of the Berlin House of Representatives
- Assuming office 29 October 2026
- Succeeding: Björn Wohlert
- Constituency: Reinickendorf 4

Personal details
- Born: 1986 (age 39–40)
- Party: Christian Democratic Union

Tomasz Klon (born 1986) is a Polish-born German politician who was elected member of the Berlin House of Representatives in 2026. He has served as chairman of the Christian Democratic Union in Wittenau since 2025.
