= Mąkoszyce, Greater Poland Voivodeship =

Mąkoszyce
- Village
- Location within Poland
- Coordinates: 51°21′24″N 17°47′20″E
- Country: Poland
- Voivodeship: Greater Poland
- County: Ostrzeszów
- Gmina: Kobyla Góra

Mąkoszyce [mɔnkɔˈʂɨt͡sɛ] is a village in the administrative district of Gmina Kobyla Góra, within Ostrzeszów County, Greater Poland Voivodeship, in west-central Poland.
