= Marszałki, Greater Poland Voivodeship =

Marszałki
- Village
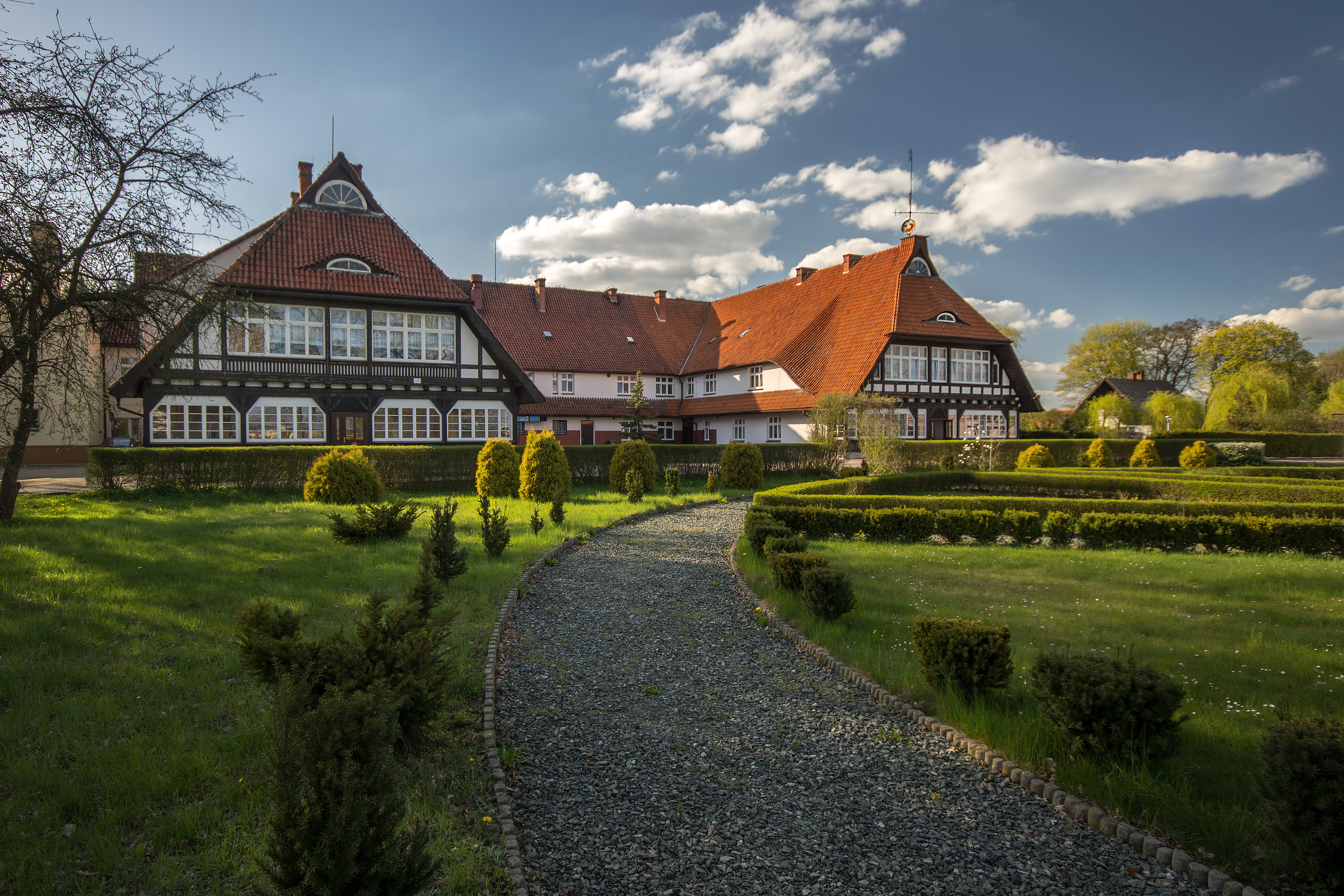
- Historic orphanage building

- Location within Poland
- Coordinates: 51°27′48″N 18°5′4″E
- Country: Poland
- Voivodeship: Greater Poland
- County: Ostrzeszów
- Gmina: Grabów nad Prosną
- Population (approx.): 700

Marszałki [marˈʂau̯ki] is a village in the administrative district of Gmina Grabów nad Prosną, within Ostrzeszów County, Greater Poland Voivodeship, in west-central Poland.

The village has an approximate population of 700.
