= Gmina Grabów nad Prosną =

Gmina Grabów nad Prosną Grabów nad Prosną Commune
- Gmina
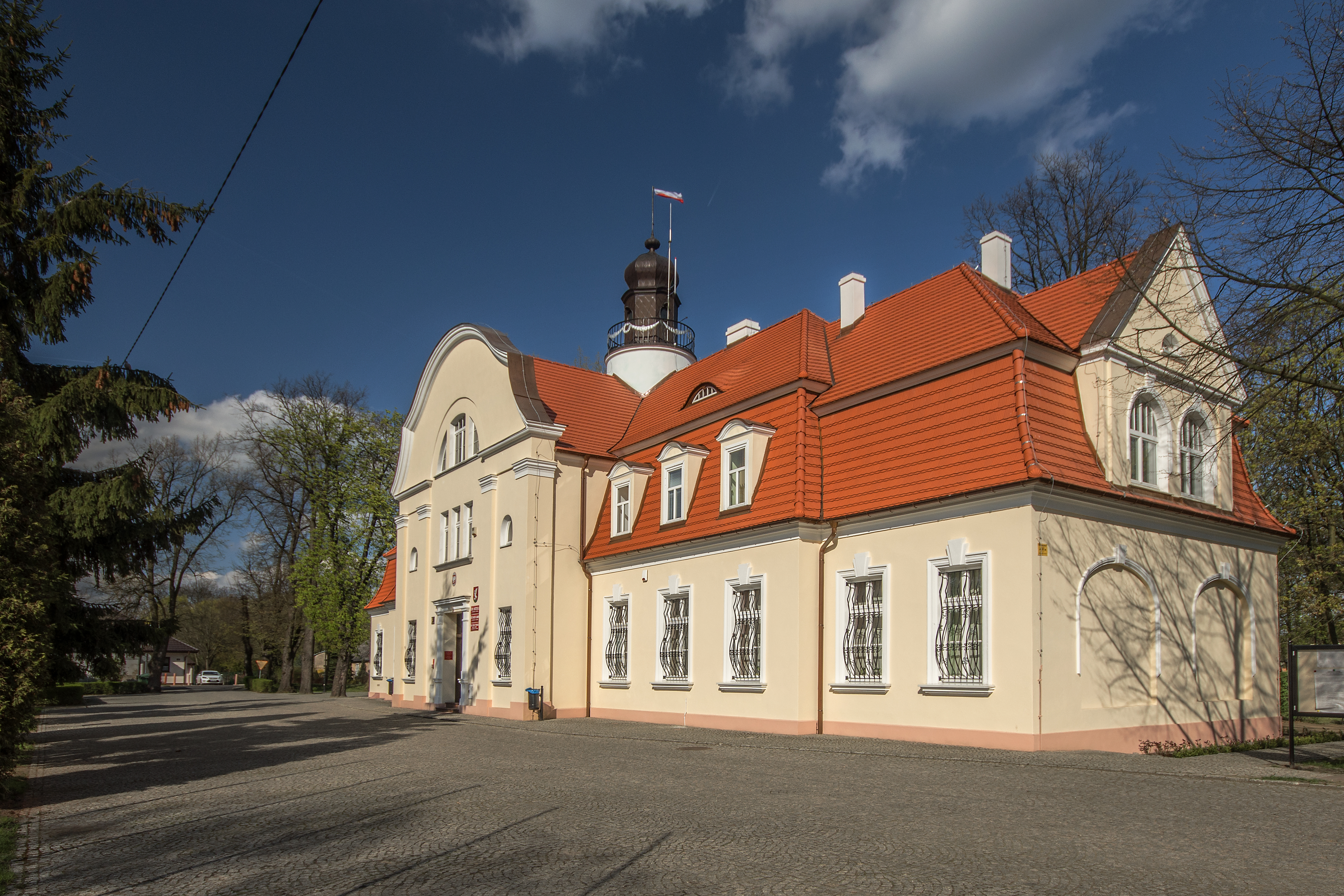
- Town Hall in Grabów nad Prosną, seat of the gmina office

- Flag Coat of arms
- Interactive map of Gmina Grabów nad Prosną
- Coordinates (Grabów nad Prosną): 51°30′N 18°7′E
- Country: Poland
- Voivodeship: Greater Poland
- County: Ostrzeszów
- Seat: Grabów nad Prosną

Area
  - Total: 123.55 km^{2} (47.70 sq mi)

Population (2006)
  - Total: 7,837
  - Density: 63.43/km^{2} (164.3/sq mi)
  - Urban: 1,967
  - Rural: 5,870
- Time zone: UTC+1 (CET)
  - Summer (DST): UTC+2 (CEST)
- Website: http://www.grabownadprosna.com.pl/

Gmina Grabów nad Prosną is an urban-rural gmina (administrative district) in Ostrzeszów County, Greater Poland Voivodeship, in west-central Poland. Its seat is the town of Grabów nad Prosną, which lies approximately 14 kilometres (9 mi) north-east of Ostrzeszów and 130 km (81 mi) south-east of the regional capital Poznań.

The gmina covers an area of 123.55 square kilometres (47.7 sq mi), and as of 2006 its total population is 7,837 (out of which the population of Grabów nad Prosną amounts to 1,967, and the population of the rural part of the gmina is 5,870).

== Villages ==
Apart from the town of Grabów nad Prosną, Gmina Grabów nad Prosną contains the villages and settlements of Bobrowniki, Bukownica, Chlewo, Dębicze, Giżyce, Grabów-Pustkowie, Grabów-Wójtostwo, Kopeć, Książenice, Kuźnica Bobrowska, Marszałki, Siekierzyn, Skrzynki, Smolniki and Zawady.

== Neighbouring gminas ==
Gmina Grabów nad Prosną is bordered by the gminas of Czajków, Doruchów, Galewice, Kraszewice, Mikstat, Ostrzeszów and Sieroszewice.
