= Mige (disambiguation) =

Mige may refer to:

== Places ==
- Migé, Yonne, Bourgogne-Franche-Comté, France

== People ==
- Mige (musician) (born 1974, as Mikko Henrik Julius Paananen), Finnish musician
- Bǔ Mígé (1612–1659; Chinese: 卜彌格; pinyin: Bǔ Mí-gé; born Michał Piotr Boym), Jesuit missionary to China
- Jīn Mígé (1602–1667; Chinese: 金弥格; pinyin: Jīn Mí-gé; born Michel Trigault), Catholic missionary to China and founder of the Cathedral of the Immaculate Conception, Taiyuan, Shanxi, China

== other uses ==
- Mige language
- membrane-bound immunoglobulin E (mIgE)

== See also ==
- Mije (disambiguation)
- Mij (disambiguation)
- Midge (disambiguation)
