= Gmina Czajków =

Gmina Czajków Czajków Commune
- Gmina
- Coat of arms
- Interactive map of Gmina Czajków
- Coordinates (Czajków): 51°29′16″N 18°19′36″E
- Country: Poland
- Voivodeship: Greater Poland
- County: Ostrzeszów
- Seat: Czajków

Area
  - Total: 70.77 km^{2} (27.32 sq mi)

Population (2006)
  - Total: 2,584
  - Density: 36.51/km^{2} (94.57/sq mi)
- Website: http://www.czajkow-gmina.pl

Gmina Czajków is a rural gmina (administrative district) in Ostrzeszów County, Greater Poland Voivodeship, in west-central Poland. Its seat is the village of Czajków, which lies approximately 25 kilometres (16 mi) north-east of Ostrzeszów and 141 km (88 mi) south-east of the regional capital Poznań.

The gmina covers an area of 70.77 square kilometres (27.3 sq mi), and as of 2006 its total population is 2,584.

== Villages ==
Gmina Czajków contains the villages and settlements of Czajków, Klon, Michałów, Mielcuchy, Mielcuchy Pierwsze, Muchy, Salamony and Zadki.

== Neighbouring gminas ==
Gmina Czajków is bordered by the gminas of Brąszewice, Brzeziny, Galewice, Grabów nad Prosną, Klonowa and Kraszewice.
