= Rojów =

- Village
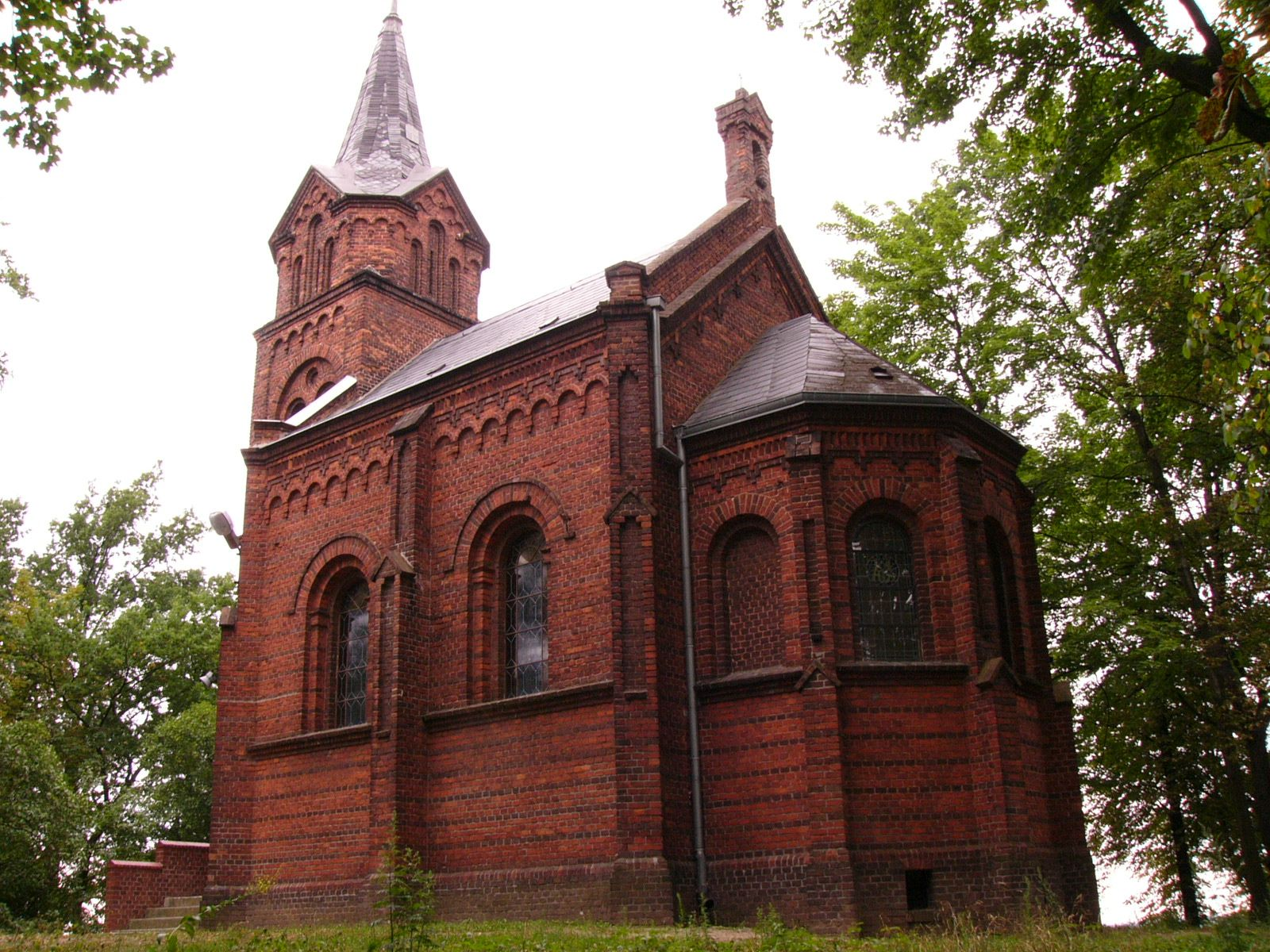
- Church of Saint Adalbert

- Location within Poland
- Coordinates: 51°25′0″N 17°52′0″E
- Country: Poland
- Voivodeship: Greater Poland
- County: Ostrzeszów
- Gmina: Ostrzeszów

Population
  - Total: 620

Rojów [ˈrɔjuf] is a village in the administrative district of Gmina Ostrzeszów, within Ostrzeszów County, Greater Poland Voivodeship, in west-central Poland.
