= Giżyce, Greater Poland Voivodeship =

Giżyce
- Village
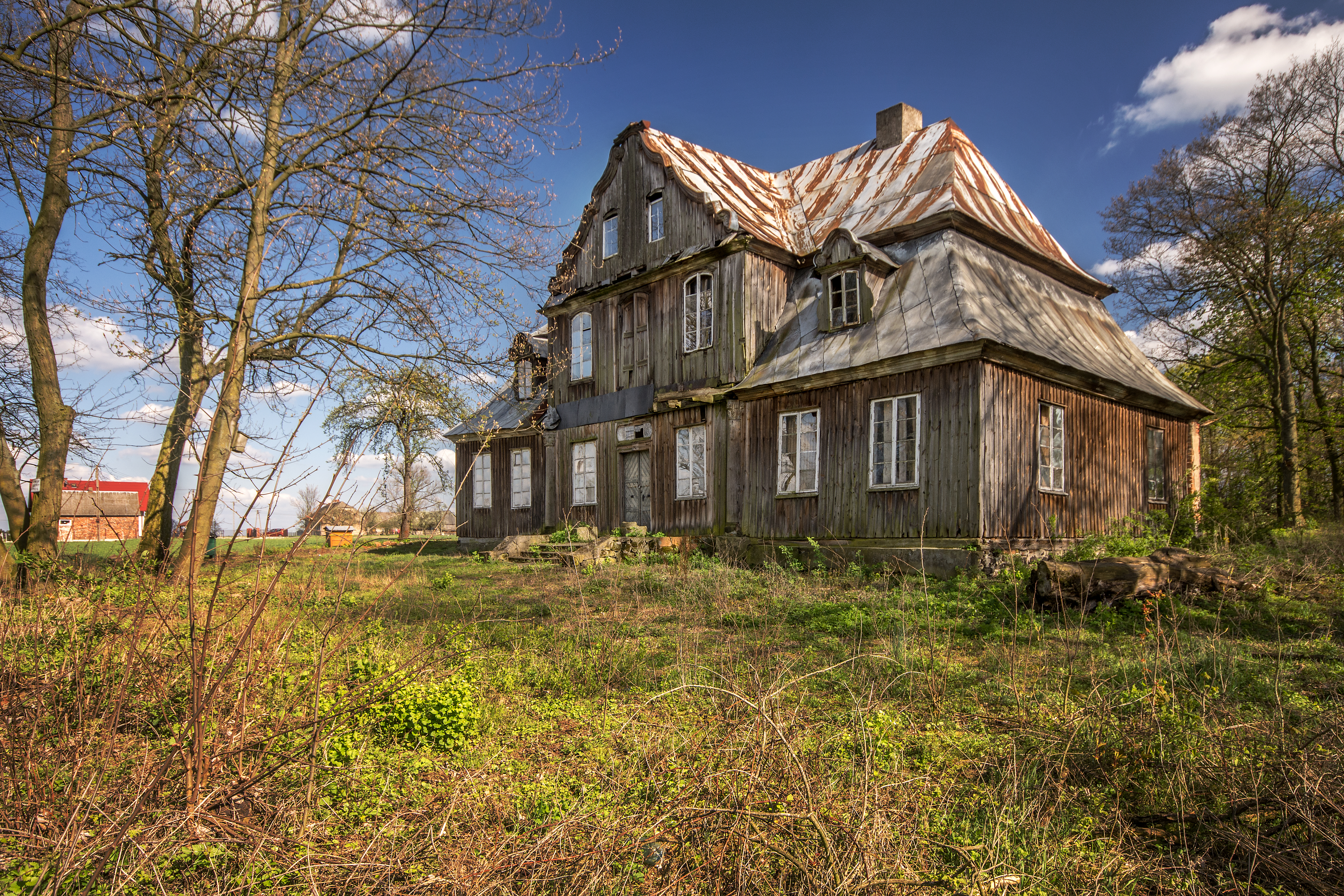
- Wooden manor from 1760-1775

- Location within Poland
- Coordinates: 51°31′22″N 18°9′22″E
- Country: Poland
- Voivodeship: Greater Poland
- County: Ostrzeszów
- Gmina: Grabów nad Prosną

Giżyce [ɡiˈʐɨt͡sɛ] is a village in the administrative district of Gmina Grabów nad Prosną, within Ostrzeszów County, Greater Poland Voivodeship, in west-central Poland.
