= Turze, Greater Poland Voivodeship =

Turze
- Village
- Location within Poland
- Coordinates: 51°21′4″N 17°56′51″E
- Country: Poland
- Voivodeship: Greater Poland
- County: Ostrzeszów
- Gmina: Ostrzeszów
- Population: 160

Turze [ˈtuʐɛ] is a village in the administrative district of Gmina Ostrzeszów, within Ostrzeszów County, Greater Poland Voivodeship, in west-central Poland.
