= Siedlików =

- Village
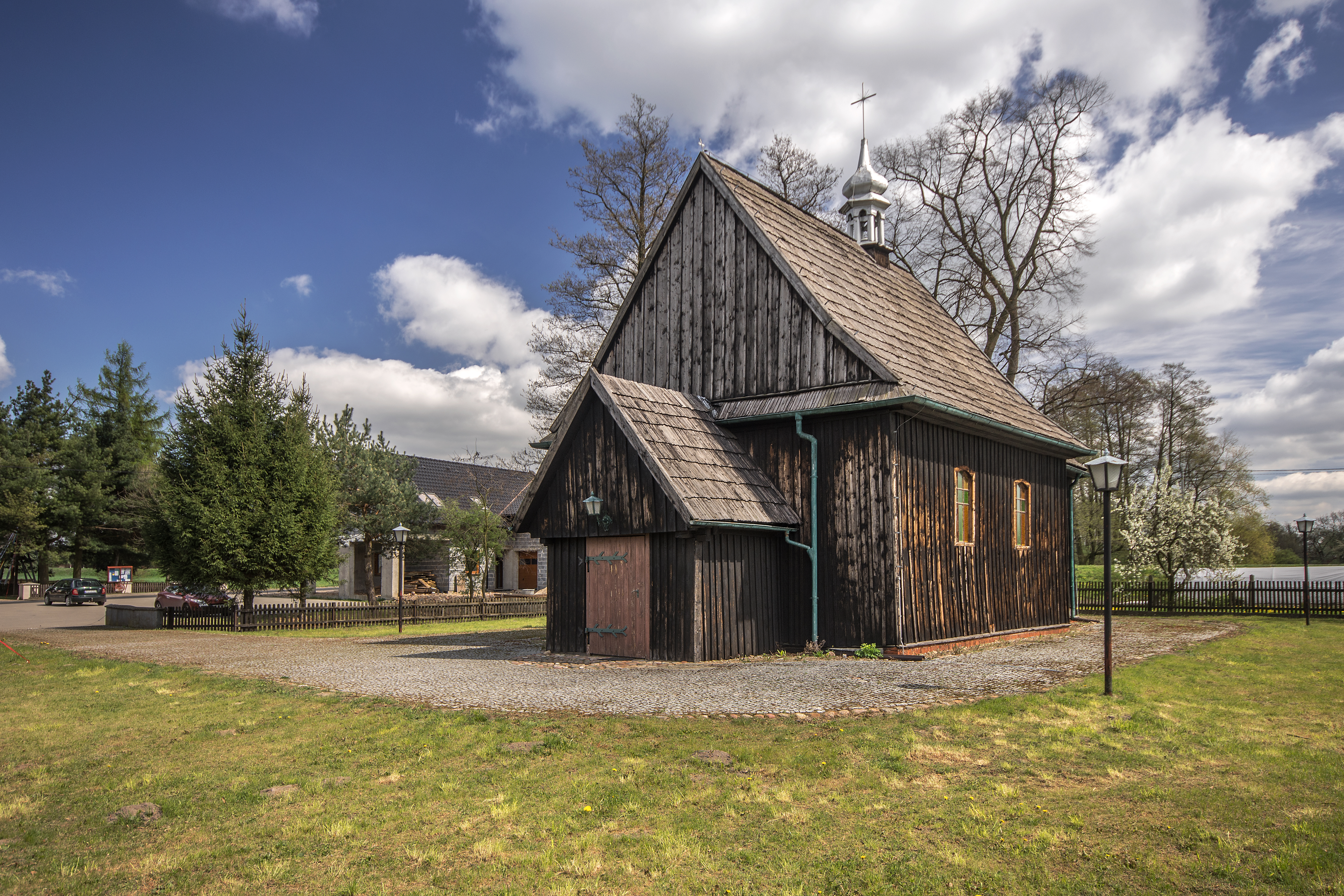
- Church of Saint Andrew

- Location within Poland
- Coordinates: 51°28′N 17°58′E
- Country: Poland
- Voivodeship: Greater Poland
- County: Ostrzeszów
- Gmina: Ostrzeszów

Siedlików [ɕɛˈdlikuf] is a village in the administrative district of Gmina Ostrzeszów, within Ostrzeszów County, Greater Poland Voivodeship, in west-central Poland.

The village is the birthplace of the Nike Award-winning Polish writer and journalist Marian Pilot.
