= Bodo Uhse =

German writer, journalist and political activist (1904–1963)

- Bodo Uhse in 1955

President of the German Writers' Union
- In office 1950–1952
- Preceded by: position established
- Succeeded by: Anna Seghers

Member of the Volkskammer
- In office 1950–1954

Personal details
- Born: March 12, 1904 Rastatt, German Empire
- Died: July 2, 1963 (aged 59) East Berlin, German Democratic Republic
- Resting place: Dorotheenstadt Cemetery
- Party: Socialist Unity Party of Germany (1948–); Communist Party of Germany (1930–1946); Black Front (1930); Nazi Party (1927–1930)
- Spouse: Alma Agee
- Children: Joel Agee (step-son)

Military service
- Allegiance: Spanish Republic
- Branch/service: People's Army of the Republic
- Years of service: 1936–1938
- Unit: International Brigades
- Battles/wars: Spanish Civil War

Bodo Uhse (12 March 1904 – 2 July 1963) was a German writer, journalist and communist political activist. He was recognised as one of the most prominent authors in East Germany.

== Early years ==
Uhse came from a Prussian Junker family with a long tradition of military service. In his early years Uhse was associated with the agrarian movement and was considered to be on the far-right of this group. This was evidenced by his involvement with the extremist Landvolkbewegung of Schleswig-Holstein. He took part in the right-wing Kapp Putsch in 1920. In 1927 he became a member of the Nazi Party as a protege of Gregor Strasser. He remained a member until 1930, when he joined the Communist Party of Germany under the influence of Bruno von Salomon (the elder brother of writer Ernst von Salomon). During his Nazi membership he became editor to the Nazi party newspaper in Ingolstadt.

== Communism ==
After the Reichstag fire in 1933 he fled to Paris, where he was in contact with Ernst Niekisch. At the first International Writers Congress in Paris in 1935 he met Bertolt Brecht and Johannes R. Becher (both of whom would also later become prominent East German writers). Uhse spent the rest of the 1930s in exile in Prague where he wrote for Neue Deutsche Blätter, a German language journal that was sympathetic to communism as well as in Paris with Bruno von Salomon. During this time he was involved in the establishment of the Free German University, a Paris-based body that involved both the Communist Party and the Social Democratic Party of Germany. In 1936 Uhse was one of a number of exiled dissidents to be declared ausgebürgert (deprived of German citizenship) by the Nazi regime.

During the Spanish Civil War, he served as an officer in the International Brigades and wrote regularly about the conflict, with some of his work even smuggled into Nazi Germany. His experiences in Spain and as a former member of the Nazi Party led him to write the 1944 novel Leutnant Bertram, which dealt with a Condor Legion pilot switching sides to the Republicans. The novel was a success and was translated into several languages.

== Mexico ==
In 1939, he accepted an invitation from the League of American Writers to join some other German dissidents in the United States but, despite settling there briefly, Uhse and other communist writers soon left, feeling uncomfortable in the United States due to the prevalence of anti-communist attitudes. Uhse finally settled in Mexico in 1940, becoming part of a large group of emigrant German writers and thinkers who made their home in the capital Mexico City. During this time, his brother, pilot Hans-Jürgen Uhse (1908-1944) married Beate Uhse-Rotermund, test pilot and later sex shop pioneer.

Within Mexico City Uhse found a number of like-minded exiles including Alexander Abusch, Ludwig Renn and Egon Erwin Kisch. Here he co-founded the influential exile journal Freies Deutschland along with Renn, Kisch and André Simone, and served as co-editor of this review from its 1942 foundation. His time in Mexico was chronicled in his diary, Mexicanische Erzahlungen, published in 1957.

== East Germany ==
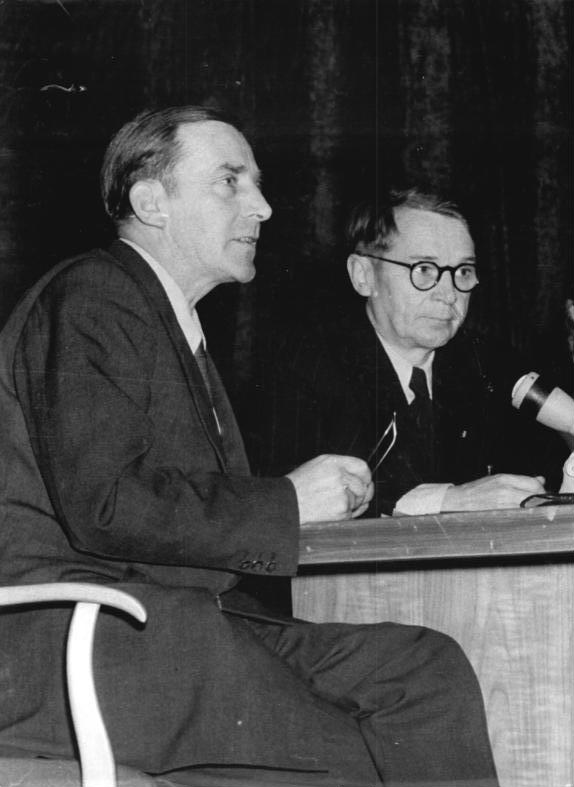
Uhse (left) with Theo Harych in 1954

After marrying the Jewish Lithuanian-American divorcee Alma Agee (second wife of James Agee) in 1945, Uhse left Mexico in 1948 to settle in East Germany, where he immediately joined the Socialist Unity Party of Germany. He became the editor in chief of the East German monthly cultural journal Aufbau in 1949, holding the position until 1958 when he was sacked as part of a wider purge of East German cultural life. His stepson Joel Agee later wrote a memoir about his family life, Twelve Years: An American Boyhood in East Germany (1981).

Uhso was a member of the People's Chamber and became the first chairman of the German Writers' Association, a position that he held from 1950 to 1952.

In 1954 Uhse joined the Literature Section of the German Academy of Arts, the most influential cultural body in the East. In 1963 he was appointed editor-in-chief of the influential literary magazine Sinn und Form. Uhse, who was suffering from severe ill health due to a lifetime of heavy drinking and smoking, died after only a few months in the post.

== Selected works ==
- Söldner und Soldat, 1935 (Mercenary and Soldier; novel)
- Leutnant Bertram, 1944 (Lieutenant Bertram, a Novel of the Nazi Luftwaffe, 1944)
- The Shadow Thrower, 1945
- Wir Söhne, 1948 (We Sons; novel)
- Die heilige Kunigunde im Schnee und andere Erzählungen, 1949 (Saint Kunigunde in the Snow and Other Stories)
- Landung in Australien: Reisebericht, 1950 (Arrival in Australian: A Travelogue)
- Die Brücke: 3 Erzählungen, 1952 (The Bridge: 3 Stories)
- Die Patrioten, 1954 (The Patriots; novel)
- Tagebuch aus China, 1956 (Diary from China)
- Mexikanische Erzählungen, 1957 (Mexican Stories)
- Die Aufgabe: Eine Kollwitz-Erzählung, 1958 (The Task: A Kollwitz Story)
- Gestalten und Probleme, 1959 (Figures and Problems)
- Reise in einem blauen Schwan: Erzählungen, 1959 (Trip Inside a Blue Swan: Stories)
- Sonntagsträumerei in der Alameda, 1961 (Sunday Dreamings in the Alameda)
- Im Rhythmus der Conga: Ein kubanischer Sommer, 1962 (To the Beat of the Conga: A Cuban Summer)
