= Björn Wohlert =

German politician (born 1988)

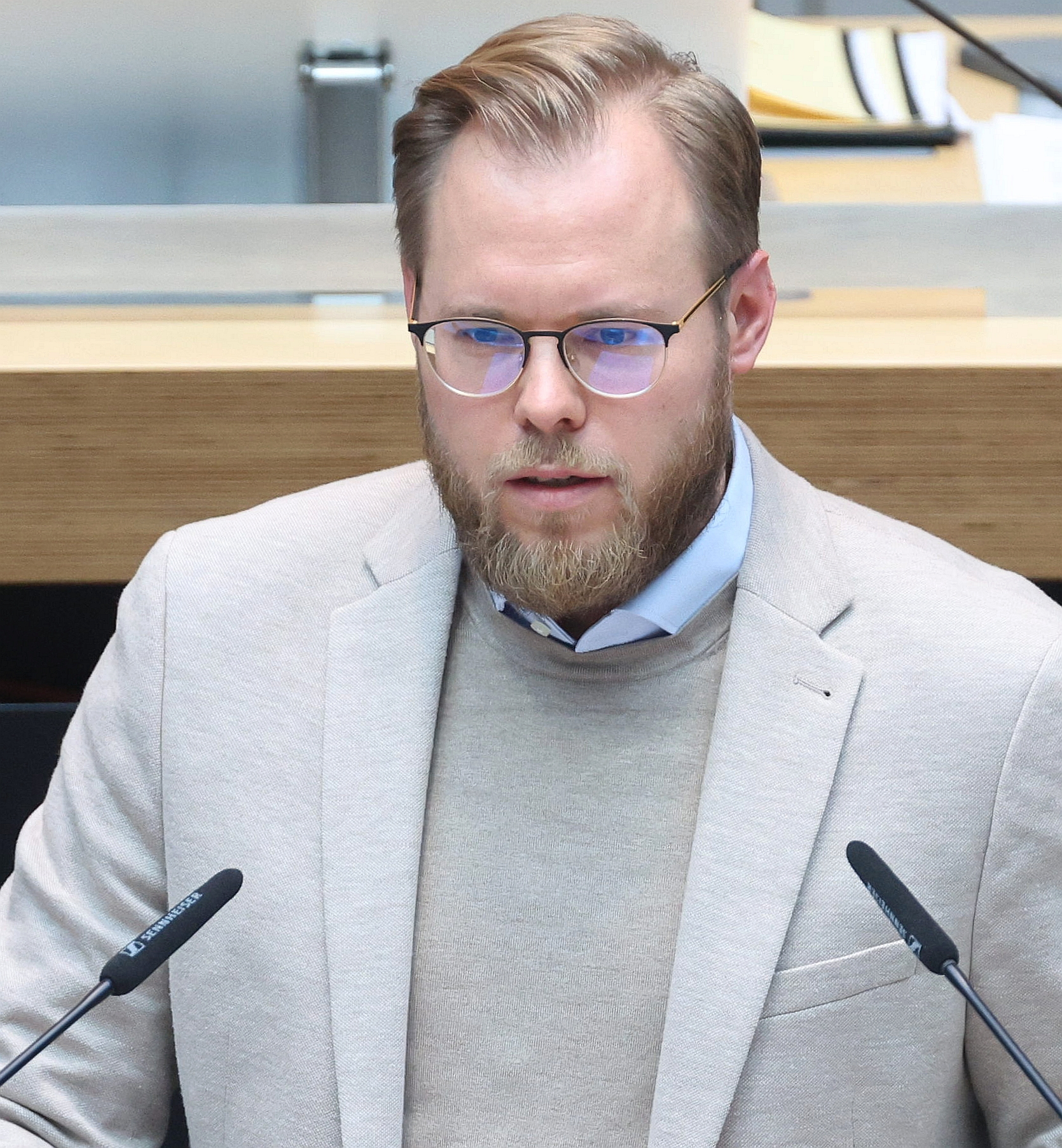
- Wohlert in 2024

Member of the Berlin House of Representatives
- Incumbent
- Assumed office 4 November 2021
- Preceded by: Tim Zeelen
- Constituency: Reinickendorf 4

Personal details
- Born: 7 January 1988 (age 38)
- Party: Christian Democratic Union

Björn Wohlert (born 7 January 1988) is a German politician serving as a member of the Berlin House of Representatives since 2021. From 2015 to 2025, he served as chairman of the Christian Democratic Union in Wittenau.
