= Miji =

Miji may refer to:

- Miji people, an ethnic group of north-east India
- Miji language, a Sino-Tibetan language
- Meaconing, Intrusion, Jamming, and Interference, actions intended to deny use of the electromagnetic spectrum

== See also ==
- Mije (disambiguation)
