= Ligota, Ostrzeszów County =

Ligota
- Village
- Location within Poland
- Coordinates: 51°22′21″N 17°48′19″E
- Country: Poland
- Voivodeship: Greater Poland
- County: Ostrzeszów
- Gmina: Kobyla Góra

Ligota [liˈɡɔta] is a village in the administrative district of Gmina Kobyla Góra, within Ostrzeszów County, Greater Poland Voivodeship, in west-central Poland.
