= Jelenie, Greater Poland Voivodeship =

Jelenie
- Village
- Location within Poland
- Coordinates: 51°29′4″N 18°15′43″E
- Country: Poland
- Voivodeship: Greater Poland
- County: Ostrzeszów
- Gmina: Kraszewice

Jelenie [jɛˈlɛɲɛ] is a village in the administrative district of Gmina Kraszewice, within Ostrzeszów County, Greater Poland Voivodeship, in west-central Poland.
