= Marian Pilot =

Polish writer (1936–2024)

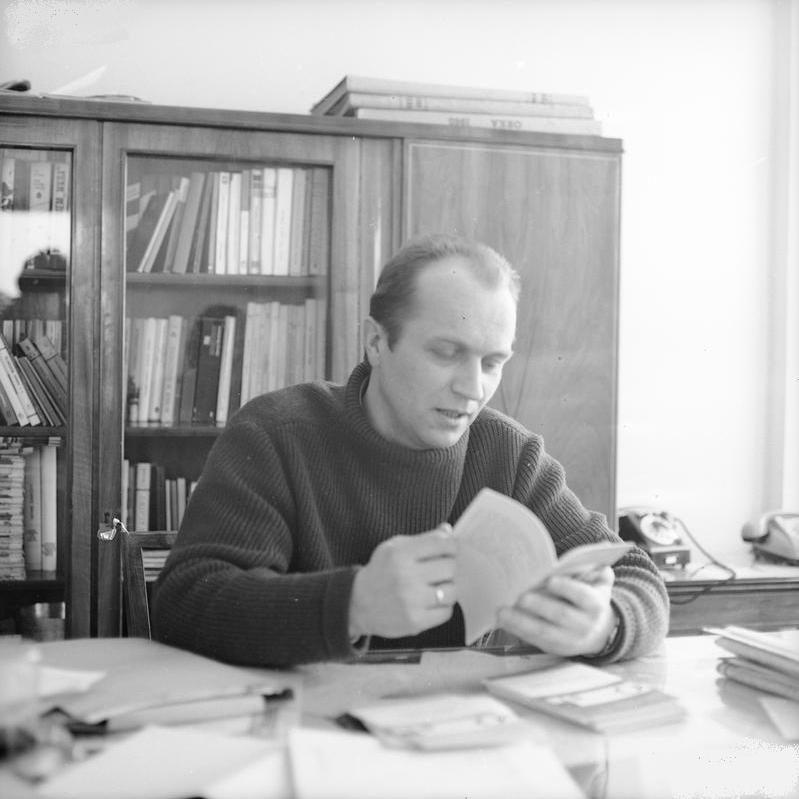
- Portrait of Pilot by Grażyna Rutowska, c. 1978
- Born: 6 December 1936; Siedlików, Poland
- Died: 2 February 2024 (aged 87); Warsaw
- Education: University of Warsaw
- Occupations: Writer, journalist, screenwriter
- Writing career
- Genre: Fiction
- Notable work: Plume (2011)
- Notable awards: Nike Award (2011)

Marian Pilot (6 December 1936 – 2 February 2024) was a Polish writer, poet, journalist and screenwriter. He received the 2011 Nike Award, Poland's most important literary prize, for his novel Pióropusz (Plume).

== Life and career ==
Born on 6 December 1936, in the village of Siedlików, Greater Poland, he attended the Marie Curie-Skłodowska High School No. 1 in Ostrzeszów. He subsequently graduated in journalism from the University of Warsaw. In 1954, he became a member of the communist Union of Polish Youth and since 1958 he worked in the culture section of the Polish Press Agency (PAP). He worked for such magazines as Wiadomości filmowe (1958–1960) and Na przełaj (1960–1967). In 1967, he joined the Polish Writers' Union and between 1967 and 1978 he served as head of culture section of Tygodnik Kulturalny weekly. Since 1981, he worked for the Polish state television Telewizja Polska.

In 1987, he received the Gold Cross of Merit. In 2009, he was granted the title of Honorary Citizen of the town of Ostrzeszów and he won the Władysław Reymont Literary Prize. In 2011, he was awarded the most prestigious prize in Polish literature, the Nike Award, for his novel Pióropusz (Plume). In 2022, he made his poetry debut by publishing Dzikie mięso (Wild Meat) which won 1st Prize at the Artur Fryz Literature Competition and for which he was nominated to the Angelus Award.

Pilot died in Warsaw on 2 February 2024, at the age of 87.

== Publications ==
- Dzikie mięso, Kraków 2021
- Osobnik, Kraków 2013
- Nowy matecznik, Kraków 2012
- Zabawna zabawka albo Vin d'adieu, Warsaw 2012
- Ssapy, szkudły, świętojanki: słownik dawnej gwary Siedlikowa, Warsaw 2011, Ostrzeszów 2012
- Pióropusz, Kraków 2010
- Gody, Warsaw 2009
- Cierpki, oboki, nice: bardzo małe opo, Warsaw 2006
- Na odchodnym: opowieści i opowiadania, Warsaw 2002
- Bitnik Gorgolewski, Warsaw 1989
- Matecznik, Warsaw 1988
- W słońcu, w deszczu, Warsaw 1981
- Ciżba: opowiadania i opowieści, Warsaw 1980
- Wykidajło, Warsaw 1980
- Jednorożec, Warsaw 1978, 1981
- Karzeł pierwszy, król tutejszy; Tam, gdzie much nie ma albo brzydactwa, Warsaw 1976
- Zakaz zwałki, Warsaw 1974
- Pantałyk, Warsaw 1970, Kraków 2012
- Majdan, Warsaw 1969
- Opowieści świętojańskie, Warsaw 1966
- Sień, Warsaw 1965, 1989
- Panny szczerbate: opowiadania, Warsaw 1962, 1977.

== Filmography ==
- 1997: Historia o proroku Eliaszu z Wierszalina – script
- 1987: Ucieczka z miejsc ukochanych – dialogues
- 1984: Pan na Żuławach – script
- 1979: W słońcu i w deszczu – script

== See also ==
- Polish literature
- List of Polish writers
