= Książenice, Greater Poland Voivodeship =

Książenice
- Village
- Location within Poland
- Coordinates: 51°29′35″N 18°4′50″E
- Country: Poland
- Voivodeship: Greater Poland
- County: Ostrzeszów
- Gmina: Grabów nad Prosną

Książenice [kɕɔ̃ʐɛˈnit͡sɛ] is a village in the administrative district of Gmina Grabów nad Prosną, within Ostrzeszów County, Greater Poland Voivodeship, in west-central Poland.
