= Czajków, Ostrzeszów County =

Czajków
- Village
- Location within Poland
- Coordinates: 51°29′16″N 18°19′36″E
- Country: Poland
- Voivodeship: Greater Poland
- County: Ostrzeszów
- Gmina: Czajków
- Population: 1,100

Czajków [ˈt͡ʂai̯kuf] is a village in Ostrzeszów County, Greater Poland Voivodeship, in west-central Poland. It is the seat of the gmina (administrative district) called Gmina Czajków.
