= Klon, Greater Poland Voivodeship =

Klon
- Village
- Location within Poland
- Coordinates: 51°27′55″N 18°17′23″E
- Country: Poland
- Voivodeship: Greater Poland
- County: Ostrzeszów
- Gmina: Czajków

Klon [klɔn] is a village in the administrative district of Gmina Czajków, within Ostrzeszów County, Greater Poland Voivodeship, in west-central Poland.
