= Władysław Biegański =

Polish medical doctor, philosopher and social activist

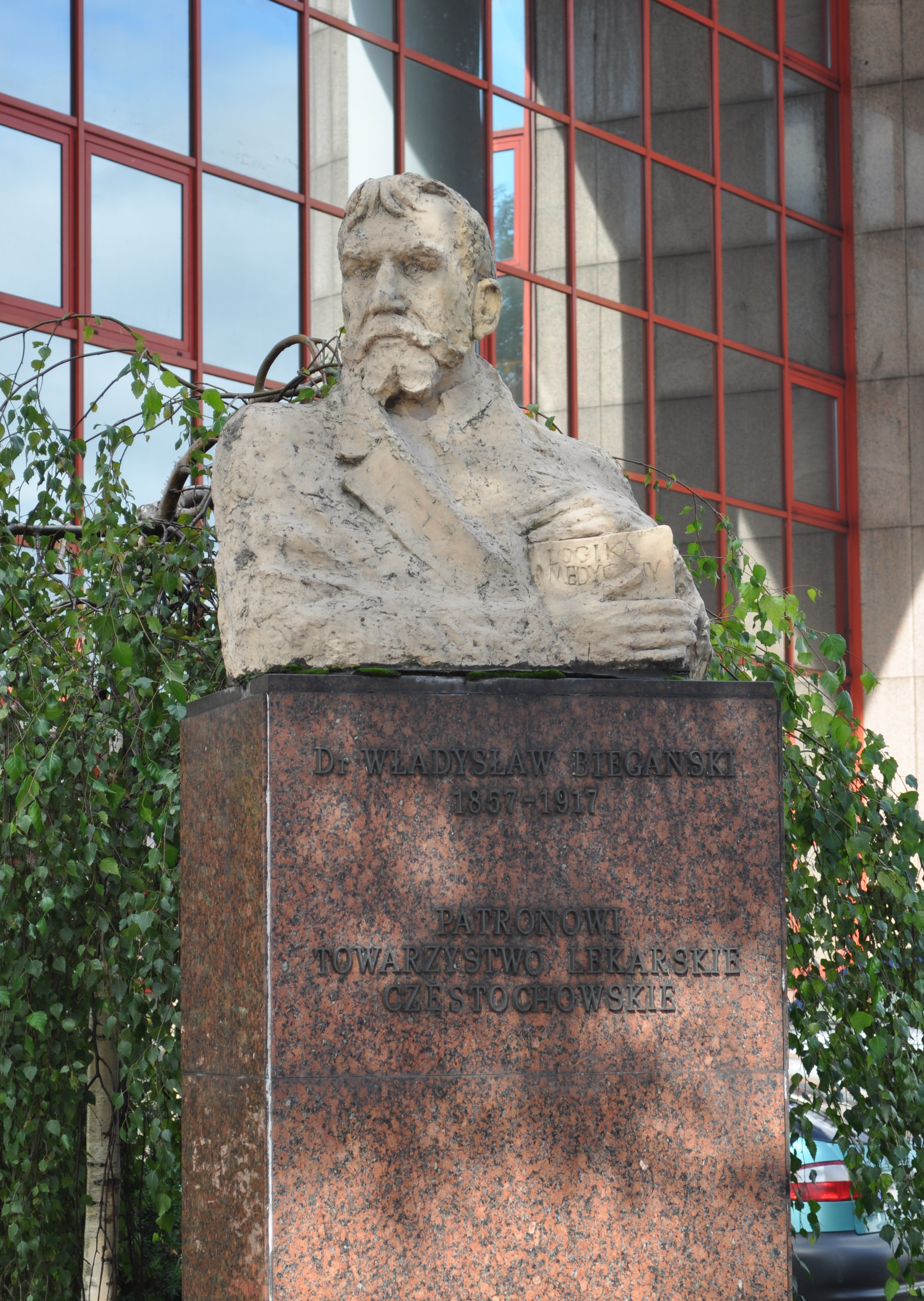
Władysław Biegański monument near main train station in Częstochowa

Władysław Biegański (28 April 1857 – 29 January 1917) was a Polish medical doctor, philosopher and social activist. He dealt with almost all fields, especially infectious diseases, disease diagnostics and logic in medicine.

== Biography ==
Biegański was born in Grabów nad Prosną. Between 1870 and 1875 he studied at high school in Piotrków Trybunalski; at that time he lived in nearby Janow. Immediately after graduating from junior high school, he started medical studies at the Imperial University of Warsaw, which he graduated from in 1880. In his fifth year of study, he wrote a thesis for the competition organized by the Faculty of Philosophy, Comparison of the teachings on the ideas of Lock and Leibniz.

After internships—mainly obstetrical—in Berlin and Prague in 1883, he settled permanently in Częstochowa, where he opened a private practice. He became a hospital and municipal doctor, between 1884 and 1910 he was a departmental doctor on the Warsaw-Vienna railway, and he also served as a factory doctor (from 1887 at the Motte factory and from 1885 at the Częstochowianka factory). He held the office of the director of the municipal hospital (until 1907), which he reorganized and transformed into an important medical and scientific centre of the region.

Between 1901 and 1917 Biegański served as President of the Medical Association of Częstochowa (which he co-founded). He was also the creator and president of the Society for Charity for Christians (1899–1901) and the initiator (1906) and the first president of the Częstochowa Branch of the Polish Countryside Society, as well as a promoter of hygiene issues (in 1901 he founded the Hygienic Society). He initiated the creation of the City Library (currently bearing his name). In Częstochowa he conducted scientific work, away from Polish academic centres, which meant that he was called "a professor without a cathedral."

In 1906, he was a co-organizer of the 1st Polish Junior High School in Częstochowa at ul. Kościuszki 10/12.

Biegański also dealt with the philosophy of medicine and belonged to the Polish school of philosophy of medicine. From 1907 he was a member of the Warsaw Scientific Society.

He wrote several textbooks, including: Differential diagnosis of internal diseases (1891), Lectures on acute infectious diseases (1900-1901), General issues in the theory of medical sciences (1897), Logic of medicine (1894, supplemented in 1908 and published as the Logic of medicine, i.e. the principles of general methodology of medical sciences, in 1909 in Germany). He published in Medical Review, News and Medicine. As a philosopher, he devoted himself to the theory of knowledge and the origin of morality. Biegański described his views as previsit. His greatest philosophical works are: The Principles of General Logic (1903), Theory of Logic (1912), The Treatise on Knowledge and Truth (1910), Theory of Knowledge from the Position of the Principle of Purpose (1914–1915), Previsitism and Pragmatism, Manual of Logic for High Schools and self-taught (1906), and General Ethics (posthumously, 1918).

From 1885, he was married to Mieczysława Rozenfeldówna, the daughter of engineer Henryk Rozenfeld.

He died of angina and was buried in Kule cemetery in Częstochowa.

By resolution of 4 November 2016, the Sejm of the Republic of Poland established 2017 as the Year of Władysław Biegański.
