= Królewskie, Ostrzeszów County =

Królewskie
- Village
- Location within Poland
- Coordinates: 51°23′52″N 17°58′23″E
- Country: Poland
- Voivodeship: Greater Poland
- County: Ostrzeszów
- Gmina: Ostrzeszów

Królewskie [kruˈlɛfskʲɛ] is a village in the administrative district of Gmina Ostrzeszów, within Ostrzeszów County, Greater Poland Voivodeship, in west-central Poland.
