= Głuszyna, Greater Poland Voivodeship =

Głuszyna
- Village
- Location within Poland
- Coordinates: 51°32′1″N 18°17′59″E
- Country: Poland
- Voivodeship: Greater Poland
- County: Ostrzeszów
- Gmina: Kraszewice

Głuszyna [ɡwuˈʂɨna] is a village in the administrative district of Gmina Kraszewice, within Ostrzeszów County, Greater Poland Voivodeship, in west-central Poland.
