= Kraszewice, Greater Poland Voivodeship =

Kraszewice
- Village
- Location within Poland
- Coordinates: 51°31′2″N 18°13′24″E
- Country: Poland
- Voivodeship: Greater Poland
- County: Ostrzeszów
- Gmina: Kraszewice
- Population (approx.): 1,600
- Website: http://www.kraszewice.pl/

Kraszewice [kraʂɛˈvit͡sɛ] is a village in Ostrzeszów County, Greater Poland Voivodeship, in west-central Poland. It is the seat of the gmina (administrative district) called Gmina Kraszewice.

The village has an approximate population of 1,600.
