= Gmina Kraszewice =

Gmina Kraszewice Kraszewice Commune
- Gmina
- Coat of arms
- Interactive map of Gmina Kraszewice
- Coordinates (Kraszewice): 51°31′2″N 18°13′24″E
- Country: Poland
- Voivodeship: Greater Poland
- County: Ostrzeszów
- Seat: Kraszewice

Area
  - Total: 75.11 km^{2} (29.00 sq mi)

Population (2006)
  - Total: 3,621
  - Density: 48.21/km^{2} (124.9/sq mi)
- Website: http://www.kraszewice.bazagmin.pl/

Gmina Kraszewice is a rural gmina (administrative district) in Ostrzeszów County, Greater Poland Voivodeship, in west-central Poland. Its seat is the village of Kraszewice, which lies approximately 21 kilometres (13 mi) north-east of Ostrzeszów and 133 km (83 mi) south-east of the regional capital Poznań.

The gmina covers an area of 75.11 square kilometres (29.0 sq mi), and as of 2006 its total population is 3,621.

== Villages ==
Gmina Kraszewice contains the villages and settlements of Głuszyna, Jaźwiny, Jelenie, Kraszewice, Kuźnica Grabowska, Mączniki, Racławice and Renta.

== Neighbouring gminas ==
Gmina Kraszewice is bordered by the gminas of Brzeziny, Czajków, Grabów nad Prosną and Sieroszewice.
