= Midge (disambiguation) =

The midge is a very small, two-winged flying insect.

Midge may also refer to:

== Military ==
- Folland Midge, a British subsonic light fighter aircraft
- HMQS Midge, an Australian torpedo launch in service from 1887 to 1912
- Canadair CL-89, a surveillance drone called Midge in UK service

== People ==
=== First name or nickname ===
- Midge Bosworth (born 1941), Australian former racing driver
- Toughie Brasuhn (1923–1971), American roller derby skater
- Marjorie Frances Bruford (1902–1958), British painter
- Midge Costanza (1932–2010), American politician
- Midge Costin, American filmmaker
- Midge Decter (1927–2022), American neoconservative journalist and author of various books
- Midge Didham (born 1945), New Zealand retired jockey
- Mildred Gillars (1900–1988), American broadcaster of Nazi propaganda during World War II
- Midge Gillies, British journalist and biographer
- Marjorie Gladman (1908–1999), American amateur tennis player
- Midge Mackenzie (1938–2004), Dublin born writer and film maker
- Midge Marsden (born 1945), New Zealand blues and R&B guitarist, harmonica-player, and singer
- Midge Miller (1922–2009), American politician
- Marjorie Moreman (1902–1987), British gymnast
- Midge Nelson (born 1937), Australian field hockey player
- Midge Potts, transgender political activist
- Margaret Purce (born 1995), American soccer player
- Marjorie Rendell (born 1947), American jurist and first lady of Pennsylvania
- Midge Richardson (1930–2012), American nun and educator turned author and editor of Seventeen magazine
- Midge Ure (born 1953), Scottish guitarist, singer and songwriter
- Midge Ware (1927–2020), American model and actress
- Midge Whiteman, former Australian racing driver
- Midge Williams (1915–1952), African-American Swing Jazz vocalist during the 1930s and 1940s

=== Surname ===
- Tiffany Midge, Native American poet

== Fictional characters ==
- Midge (Barbie), a doll in the Barbie line
- Midge, the Miller's Son, a character in several Robin Hood tales
- Midge Klump, from Archie Comics
- Midge Carter, in the play I'm Not Rappaport and its adaptations
- Midge Maisel, in The Marvelous Mrs. Maisel, an American television series
- Midge Pinciotti, in That '70's Show, an American television series
- Midge, a pet mouse in Mary, Mungo and Midge, a British animated children's television series
- Marge Simpson, from the TV series The Simpsons is nicknamed "Midge" apparently exclusively by Moe Szyslak
- Marjorie "Midge" Wood, a character in Alfred Hitchcock's 1958 Vertigo

== Other uses ==
- Midge Lake, Livingston Island, Antarctica
- Midge the Sea Lion (1985–2010), a resident of the Oklahoma City zoo
- Midge Linux, a Linux mini-distribution for routers
- Midge, a schooner operated by the Hudson's Bay Company in 1877 - see Hudson's Bay Company vessels
- JC Midge, a kit car

== See also ==
- Midget
- Mij (disambiguation)
- Mije (disambiguation)
- Mige (disambiguation)
