= Pisarzowice, Greater Poland Voivodeship =

Pisarzowice
- Village
- Ruins of Lutheran church

- Location within Poland
- Coordinates: 51°19′46″N 17°46′11″E
- Country: Poland
- Voivodeship: Greater Poland
- County: Ostrzeszów
- Gmina: Kobyla Góra

Pisarzowice [pisaʐɔˈvit͡sɛ] is a village in the administrative district of Gmina Kobyla Góra, within Ostrzeszów County, Greater Poland Voivodeship, in west-central Poland.
