= Bukownica, Ostrzeszów County =

Bukownica
- Village
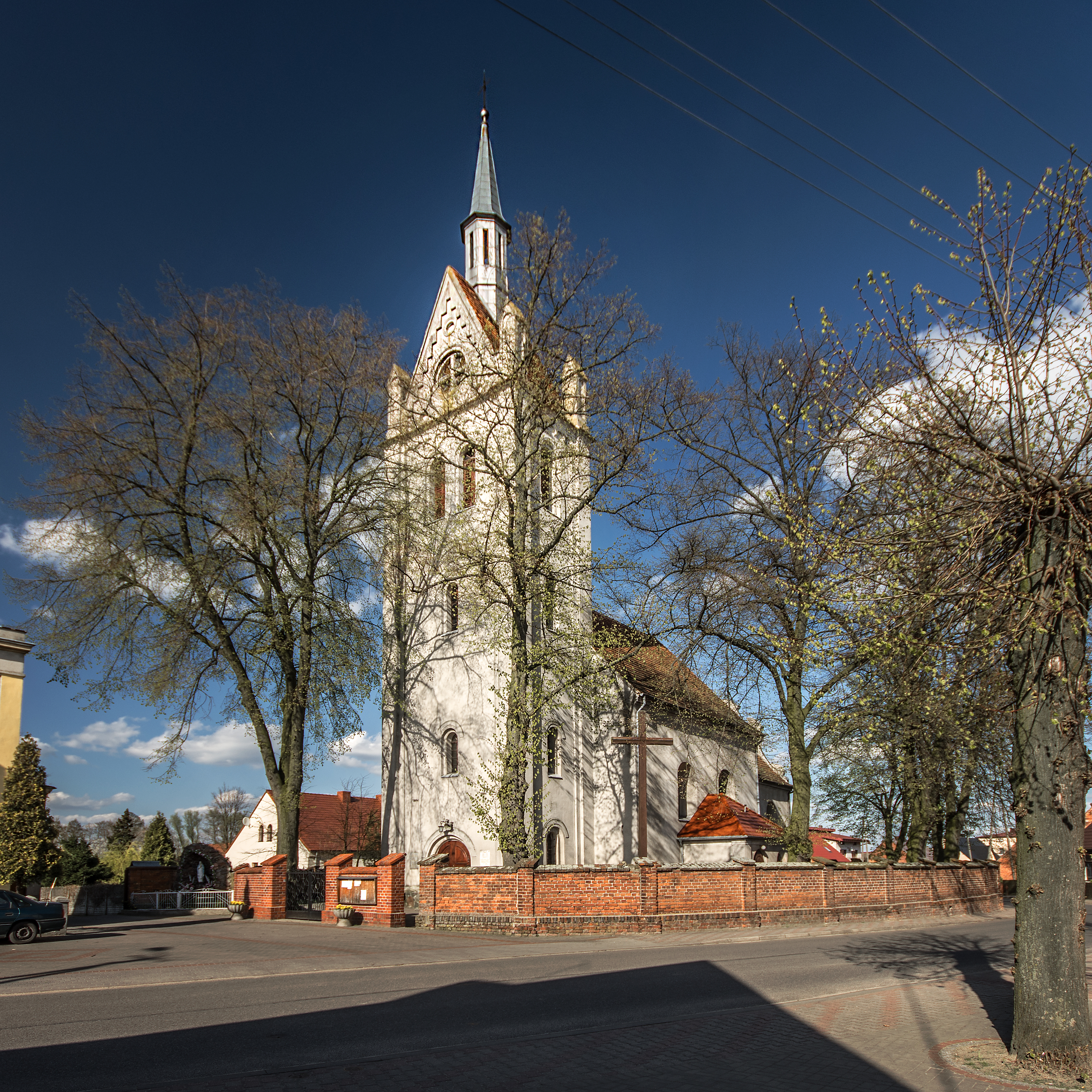
- Saints Philip and James church in Bukownica

- Location within Poland
- Coordinates: 51°28′8″N 18°2′57″E
- Country: Poland
- Voivodeship: Greater Poland
- County: Ostrzeszów
- Gmina: Grabów nad Prosną

Population
  - Total: 950
- Time zone: UTC+1 (CET)
  - Summer (DST): UTC+2 (CEST)
- Vehicle registration: POT

Bukownica [bukɔvˈnit͡sa] is a village in the administrative district of Gmina Grabów nad Prosną, within Ostrzeszów County, Greater Poland Voivodeship, in west-central Poland.

== History ==
The oldest known mention of the village comes from 1294, it was also mentioned in the Liber fundationis episcopatus Vratislaviensis from around 1305. It was then part of the medieval Piast-ruled Kingdom of Poland.

During the German invasion of Poland, which started World War II, on September 2, 1939, Germans carried out executions of seven local Poles, then set fire to local houses and shot people fleeing from the fire (see Nazi crimes against the Polish nation).
