= Gmina Doruchów =

Gmina Doruchów Doruchów Commune
- Gmina
- Coat of arms

- Coordinates (Doruchów): 51°25′N 18°5′E
- Country: Poland
- Voivodeship: Greater Poland
- County: Ostrzeszów
- Seat: Doruchów

Area
  - Total: 99.33 km^{2} (38.35 sq mi)

Population (2006)
  - Total: 5,136
  - Density: 51.71/km^{2} (133.9/sq mi)
- Website: http://www.doruchow.pl/

Gmina Doruchów is a rural gmina (administrative district) in Ostrzeszów County, Greater Poland Voivodeship, in west-central Poland. Its seat is the village of Doruchów, which lies approximately 7 kilometres (4 mi) east of Ostrzeszów and 136 km (85 mi) south-east of the regional capital Poznań.

The gmina covers an area of 99.33 square kilometres (38.4 sq mi), and as of 2006 its total population is 5,136.

== Villages ==
Gmina Doruchów contains the villages and settlements of Doruchów, Godziętowy, Gruszków, Mieleszówka, Morawin, Oświęcim, Pieczyska, Plugawice, Przytocznica, Rudniczysko, Skarydzew, Stara Kuźnica, Tokarzew, Tonia, Torzeniec, Torzeniec PGR, Wrzosy, Wygoda Plugawska, Wygoda Tokarska and Zalesie.

== Neighbouring gminas ==
Gmina Doruchów is bordered by the gminas of Galewice, Grabów nad Prosną, Kępno, Ostrzeszów and Wieruszów.
