= Grabów nad Prosną =

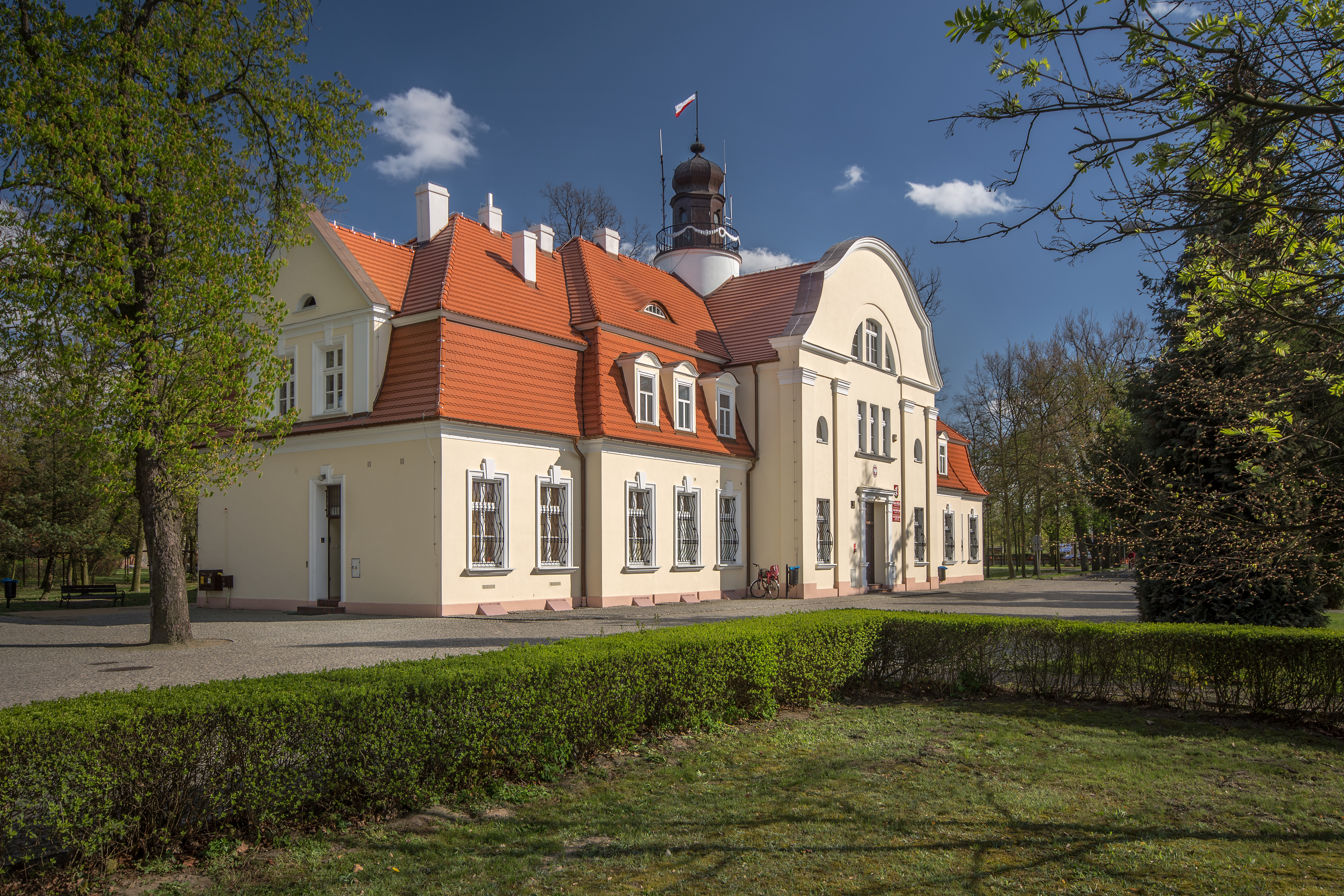
- Town hall

- Flag Coat of arms

- Location within Poland
- Coordinates: 51°30′N 18°7′E
- Country: Poland
- Voivodeship: Greater Poland
- County: Ostrzeszów
- Gmina: Grabów nad Prosną

Area
  - Total: 2.58 km^{2} (1.00 sq mi)

Population (2016)
  - Total: 1,943
  - Density: 753/km^{2} (1,950/sq mi)
- Time zone: UTC+1 (CET)
  - Summer (DST): UTC+2 (CEST)
- Postal code: 63-520
- Vehicle registration: POT
- Website: Official website

Grabów nad Prosną [ˈɡrabuf ˌnat ˈprɔsnɔ̃] is a town in Ostrzeszów County, Greater Poland Voivodeship, Poland, with about 1,900 inhabitants.

== History ==
Grabów was royal town of the Kingdom of Poland, administratively located in the Ostrzeszów County in the Sieradz Voivodeship in the Greater Poland Province.

Following the joint German-Soviet invasion of Poland, which started World War II in September 1939, the town was occupied by Germany until 1945. In 1940, the occupiers renamed it Altwerder in attempt to erase traces of Polish origin.

== Demographics ==
Historical population

Year	Pop.	±%
1810	1,441	—
1843	1,510	+4.8%
1871	1,650	+9.3%
1880	1,729	+4.8%
1890	1,708	−1.2%
1900	1,805	+5.7%
1910	1,956	+8.4%

Year	Pop.	±%
1921	1,730	−11.6%
1931	1,682	−2.8%
1939	1,690	+0.5%
1950	1,406	−16.8%
1960	1,585	+12.7%
2010	1,947	+22.8%

== Transport ==
Grabów nad Prosną is bypassed to the south by vovoideship road 449. Vovoideship road 450 passes right through the town.

The nearest station is in the town of Ostrzeszów.

== Notable persons ==
- Teofil Ciesielski (1847-1916), botanist and beekeeper, professor of botany at the University of Lviv, director of the botanical garden in Lviv, one of the initiators and founders of Polish Copernicus Society of Naturalists
- Władysław Biegański (1857-1917), medical doctor, philosopher and social activist
