= Jim Holmberg =

American singer and songwriter

- Also known as: Mij
- Born: James Gary Holmberg
- Origin: Salt Lake City
- Label: ESP

Jim Holmberg (born James Gary Holmberg) is an American singer and songwriter. His only album, on which he was credited as Mij ("Jim" spelled backwards), was released by ESP Records in 1969, and has been described as "one of the best and strangest cosmic folk records of the 1960s".

Holmberg grew up on a farm near Salt Lake City, Utah, and attended military school in California. He was a keen football player and claimed to have had an out of body experience during one game. He started singing and playing guitar while in the US Navy, and after leaving became an itinerant folk singer. In the mid-1960s he had a motorcycle crash in Lancaster, California, which left him with a fractured skull and near-fatal spinal meningitis, after which he discovered a new falsetto singing range.

In 1968, he was singing in Washington Square Park, New York City, when he was heard one day by Bernard Stollman, the head of ESP-Disk. Stollman offered to record Holmberg, and his semi-improvised solo album was recorded in three hours on 12 January 1969, with recording engineer Onno Scholtze. The front sleeve of the album showed an outline portrait drawing of Holmberg, with the instruction Color by the Number, the title by which the album is sometimes known although in more recent years it has often been promoted as The Yodeling Astrologer, despite Holmberg's protestations that he was never an astrologer and does not yodel.

Eventually released in September 1969, the record was not commercially successful, and Holmberg disappeared from view for several decades. He worked as an electronic and computer technician in the aerospace industry in California and also spent several years in Japan. Until the album was reissued by ESP in 2009, he was unaware that it had become a cult collector's item.
