= Olszyny =

Olszyny may refer to:

- Olszyny, Lower Silesian Voivodeship (south-west Poland)
- Olszyny, Podlaskie Voivodeship (north-east Poland)
- Olszyny, Łódź Voivodeship (central Poland)
- Olszyny, Chrzanów County in Lesser Poland Voivodeship (south Poland)
- Olszyny, Gmina Rzepiennik Strzyżewski in Lesser Poland Voivodeship (south Poland)
- Olszyny, Gmina Wojnicz in Lesser Poland Voivodeship (south Poland)
- Olszyny, Masovian Voivodeship (east-central Poland)
- Olszyny, Pomeranian Voivodeship (north Poland)
- Olszyny, Warmian-Masurian Voivodeship (north Poland)
