= Doruchów =

- Village
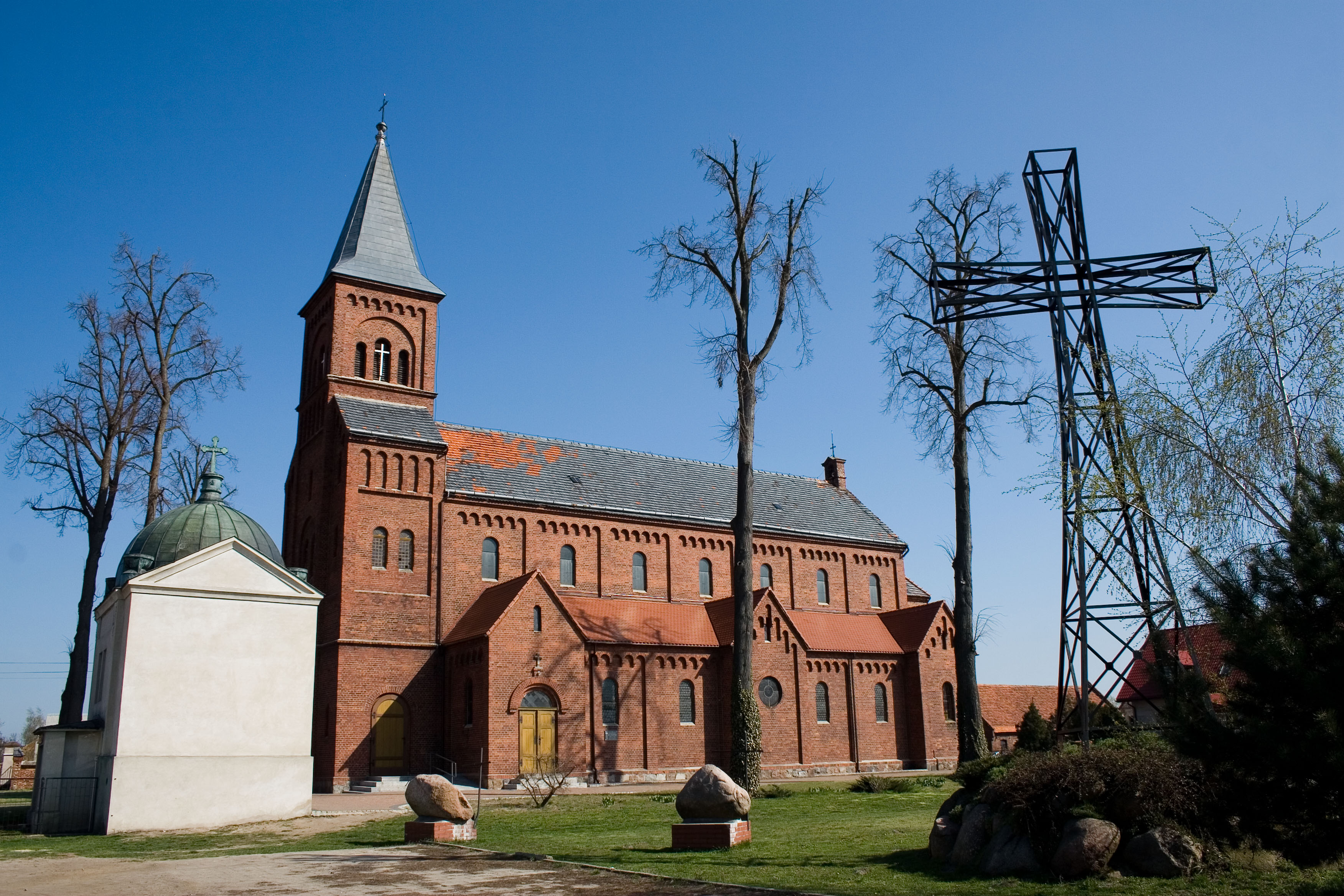
- Church of Saint Stanislaus Kostka

- Location within Poland
- Coordinates: 51°25′N 18°5′E
- Country: Poland
- Voivodeship: Greater Poland
- County: Ostrzeszów
- Gmina: Doruchów

Population
  - Total: 2,400

Doruchów [dɔˈruxuf] is a village in Ostrzeszów County, Greater Poland Voivodeship, in west-central Poland. It is the seat of the gmina (administrative district) called Gmina Doruchów.

The village was the site of the 18th-century Doruchów witch trial.

== Notable residents ==
- Theo Harych (1903–1958), German writer
