= Reinickendorf 4 =

State electoral district of Germany

- Electoral district for the Berlin House of Representatives
- Reinickendorf 4 in 2026
- District: Reinickendorf
- Electorate: 31,549 (2026)

Current electoral district
- Party: CDU
- Member: Tomasz Klon

Reinickendorf 4 is an electoral constituency (German: Wahlkreis) represented in the House of Representatives of Berlin. It elects one member via first-past-the-post voting.

== Geography ==
The constituency comprises Wittenau, Waidmannslust, Borsigwalde, and part of Tegel. It is entirely within the borough of Reinickendorf.

There were 31,549 eligible voters in 2026.

== Members ==
Election	Member	Party	%
1999	CDU	Roland Gewalt	56.4
2001	CDU	Roland Gewalt	39.7
2006	CDU	Katrin Schultze-Berndt	38.2
2011	CDU	Andreas Gram	39.3
2016	CDU	Tim Zeelen	32.3
2021	CDU	Björn Wohlert	28.4
2023	CDU	Björn Wohlert	41.3
2026	CDU	Tomasz Klon	26.6

== Election results ==
=== 2026 election ===
State election (2026): Reinickendorf 4
Notes:	Blue background denotes the winner of the electorate vote. Pink background denotes a candidate elected from their party list. Yellow background denotes an electorate win by a list member, or other incumbent. A ✓ or ✗ denotes status of any incumbent, win or lose respectively.						
Party	Candidate	Votes	%	±%	Party votes	%	±%
CDU	Tomasz Klon	5,946	26.6	▼14.7	5,831	25.9	▼13.6
AfD	Rolf Wiedenhaupt	4,356	19.5	▲9.7	4,473	19.9	▲10.0
SPD	Sven Meyer	4,205	18.8	▼4.5	3,446	15.3	▼5.3
Left	Sophia-Marie Dietrich	2,991	13.4	▲10.1	3,301	14.7	▲10.6
Greens	Georg Mensah	2,455	11.0	▼0.6	2,519	11.2	▼1.1
BSW	Thomas Scholz	869	3.9		917	4.1	
FDP	David Jahn	790	3.5	▼0.7	665	3.0	▼1.8
APT					623	2.8	▲0.1
Volt	Christoph Gerlinger	433	1.9		402	1.8	▲1.2
Mieterpartei	Hans-Harmut Lenz	289	1.3	▲0.6			
PARTEI					147	0.7	▼0.4
PdF					88	0.4	
ÖDP					34	0.2	
du.					13	0.1	Steady
DKP					10	0.0	Steady
SGP					5	0.0	
Informal votes		453			313		
Total valid votes		22,334			22,474		
Turnout		22,787	72.2	▲8.5			
CDU hold	Majority	1,590	7.1	▼10.9			

=== 2023 repeat election ===
Changes denoted below for the 2023 election are compared to the 2016 election, as the 2021 election was declared invalid.

State election (2023): Reinickendorf 4
Notes:	Blue background denotes the winner of the electorate vote. Pink background denotes a candidate elected from their party list. Yellow background denotes an electorate win by a list member, or other incumbent. A ✓ or ✗ denotes status of any incumbent, win or lose respectively.						
Party	Candidate	Votes	%	±%	Party votes	%	±%
CDU	Björn Wohlert	8,709	41.3	▲9.0	8,342	39.6	▲12.5
SPD	Sven Meyer	4,915	23.3	▼2.5	4,360	20.7	▼1.6
Greens	Eva Marie Plonske	2,447	11.6	▲1.7	2,606	12.4	▲1.5
AfD	Laila Mirzo	2,066	9.8	▼7.1	2,089	9.9	▼6.5
FDP	David Nicolas Jahn	901	4.3	▼3.3	1,011	4.8	▼3.6
Left	Gülistan Erdil	696	3.3	▼2.2	1,011	4.8	▼3.6
APT	Sabrina Ramig	642	3.0		558	2.6	▲0.6
PARTEI	Klaus Behrendt	255	1.2		216	1.0	▼0.1
The Grays					161	0.8	
dieBasis	Sabine Gabriele Graw	178	0.8		137	0.6	
Volt					122	0.6	
Gray Panthers					104	0.5	▼1.9
Pirates					75	0.4	▼0.9
Team Todenhöfer					72	0.3	
Mieterpartei	Hans-Hartmut Lenz	145	0.7		53	0.3	
FW	Udo Nitzsche	129	0.6		71	0.3	
Verjüngungsforschung					50	0.2	▼0.3
Humanists					44	0.2	
ÖDP					27	0.1	
Bildet Berlin!					24	0.1	
Klimaliste					19	0.1	
NPD					19	0.1	▼0.4
du.					17	0.1	
The Pinks/Alliance 21					13	0.1	
DKP					10	0.0	Steady
LKR					10	0.0	▼0.5
REP					9	0.0	
Bergpartei, die ÜberPartei					5	0.0	
BüSo					3	0.0	Steady
SGP					1	0.0	▼0.1
Informal votes		221			205		
Total valid votes		21,083			21,092		
Turnout		21,316	63.8	▼5.0			
CDU hold	Majority	3,794	18.0				

== See also ==
- Politics of Berlin
- House of Representatives of Berlin
