= Jürg Federspiel =

Swiss writer (1931–2007)

Jürg Fortunat Federspiel
- Born: June 28, 1931; Kemptthal, Canton Zurich
- Died: February 25, 2007 (aged 75); Basel, Switzerland
- Occupation: Writer
- Writing career
- Genres: short story, historical novel, poetry
- Notable work: The Ballad of Typhoid Mary

Jürg Fortunat Federspiel (28 June 1931 – 12 January 2007) was a Swiss writer, born in Kemptthal, Canton Zurich. Federspiel authored more than 20 novels and short story collections.

== Background and education ==
Federspiel grew up in Davos and attended secondary school in Basel. From 1951 he worked as a journalist and film critic for several Swiss newspapers, and spent time in Germany, France, Great Britain, Ireland and the USA.

== Career ==
His first notable work was a collection of short stories, Orangen und Tode ("Oranges and death") in 1961. In the English-speaking world his best-known work was The Ballad of Typhoid Mary. A historical novel about the life of Mary Mallon, it was published in German in 1982, and in English translation a year later by Random House.

Towards the end of his life, he lived alternately in Basel and New York City. His last published book was Mond ohne Zeiger ("Moon without hands"), a collection of poetry, in 2001. He suffered for years with severe diabetes and Parkinson's disease.

Federspiel died on 25 February 2007 in Basel, having been missing since 12 January 2007. The cause of death was assumed to be suicide.
