= Kobyla Góra, Greater Poland Voivodeship =

Kobyla Góra
- Village
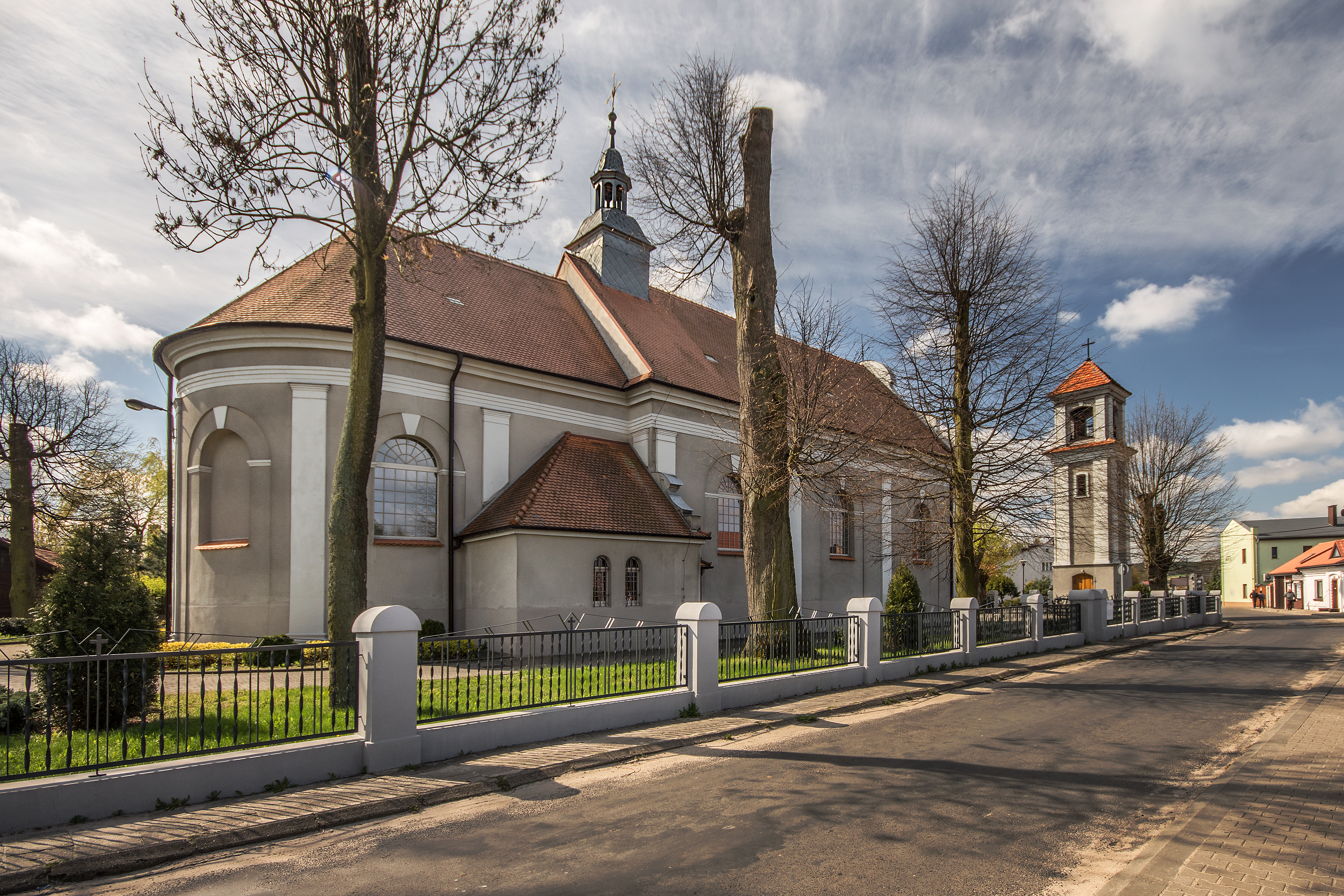
- Saint Jadwiga church in Kobyla Góra

- Location within Poland
- Coordinates: 51°22′46″N 17°50′16″E
- Country: Poland
- Voivodeship: Greater Poland
- County: Ostrzeszów
- Gmina: Kobyla Góra

Population (approx.)
  - Total: 2,000
- Time zone: UTC+1 (CET)
  - Summer (DST): UTC+2 (CEST)
- Vehicle registration: POT

Kobyla Góra [kɔˈbɨla ˈɡura] is a village in Ostrzeszów County, Greater Poland Voivodeship, in south-central Poland. It is the seat of the gmina (administrative district) called Gmina Kobyla Góra.

The village has an approximate population of 2,000.

Kobyla Góra was a private town, administratively located in the Ostrzeszów County in the Sieradz Voivodeship in the Greater Poland Province of the Kingdom of Poland.

== Gallery ==
Evangelical church

Jewish cemetery (lapidarium)
