= German Writers' Union =

- Deutscher Schriftstellerverband
- Predecessor: National Association of German Writers (Reichsverband deutscher Schriftsteller)
- Founded: 1950
- Dissolved: 1990
- Purpose: Represent German writers in the Volkskammer
- Headquarters: East Berlin
- Location: East Germany
- Official language: German

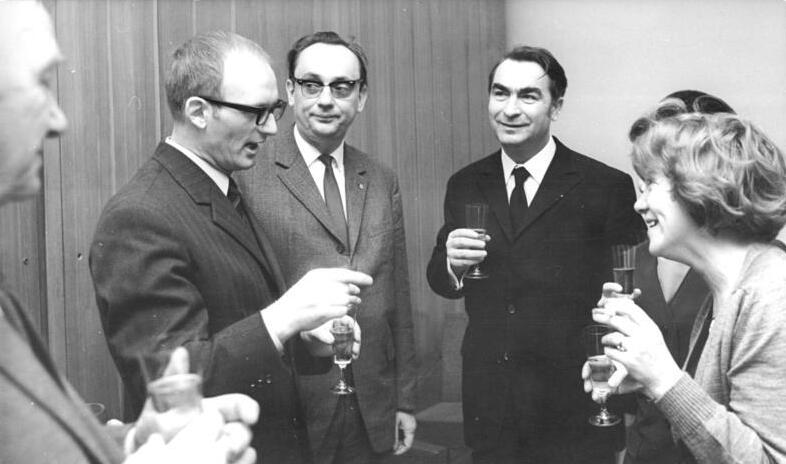
The First Secretary of the German Writers' Union, Gerhard Henniger and the president of the Association of Writers of Yugoslavia, Aco Šopov signing the cooperation agreement on February 12, 1970, in East Berlin

The German Writers' Union (German, "Deutscher Schriftstellerverband") was an East German association of writers. It was founded in 1950 and renamed in 1973 as Schriftstellerverband der DDR (Writers' Association of the GDR).

The association considered itself an heir to the earlier traditions of the SDS (Schutzverband deutscher Schriftsteller, "Protection League of German Writers") which had flourished in the 1920s but then, after 1933, been forced into line under the Hitler dictatorship and, in July 1933, found itself subsumed into the "National Association of German Writers" (Reichsverband deutscher Schriftsteller), a Nazi mandated successor organisation between 1933 and 1945.

The DSV archives are now in the Academy of Arts Berlin.

== Presidents ==
- Bodo Uhse (1950–1952)
- Anna Seghers (1952–1978)
- Hermann Kant (1978–1990)
- Rainer Kirsch (1990)

== See also ==
- National Front of the German Democratic Republic
- "Die Lösung", which mentions the Schriftstellerverband
