= Ostrzeszów County =

Ostrzeszów County Powiat ostrzeszowski
- County
- Flag Coat of arms

- Location within the voivodeship
- Coordinates (Ostrzeszów): 51°24′N 18°0′E
- Country: Poland
- Voivodeship: Greater Poland
- Seat: Ostrzeszów
- Gminas: Total 7: Gmina Czajków; Gmina Doruchów; Gmina Grabów nad Prosną; Gmina Kobyla Góra; Gmina Kraszewice; Gmina Mikstat; Gmina Ostrzeszów

Area
  - Total: 772.37 km^{2} (298.21 sq mi)

Population (2006)
  - Total: 54,490
  - Density: 70.55/km^{2} (182.7/sq mi)
  - Urban: 18,343
  - Rural: 36,147
- Car plates: POT
- Website: www.powiatostrzeszowski.pl

Ostrzeszów County (Polish: powiat ostrzeszowski) is a unit of territorial administration and local government (powiat) in Greater Poland Voivodeship, west-central Poland. It came into being on January 1, 1999, as a result of the Polish local government reforms passed in 1998. Its administrative seat and largest town is Ostrzeszów, which lies 134 kilometres (83 mi) south-east of the regional capital Poznań. The county also contains the towns of Grabów nad Prosną, lying 14 km (9 mi) north-east of Ostrzeszów, and Mikstat, 15 km (9 mi) north of Ostrzeszów.

The county covers an area of 772.37 square kilometres (298.2 sq mi). As of 2006 its total population is 54,490, out of which the population of Ostrzeszów is 14,536, that of Grabów nad Prosną is 1,967, that of Mikstat is 1,840, and the rural population is 36,147.

== Neighbouring counties ==
Ostrzeszów County is bordered by Kalisz County to the north, Sieradz County to the east, Wieruszów County to the south-east, Kępno County to the south, Oleśnica County to the west and Ostrów County to the north-west.

== Administrative divisions ==
The county is subdivided into seven gminas (three urban-rural and four rural). These are listed in the following table, in descending order of population.

Gmina	Type	Area (km²)	Population (2006)	Seat
Gmina Ostrzeszów	urban-rural	187.5	23,346	Ostrzeszów
Gmina Grabów nad Prosną	urban-rural	123.6	7,837	Grabów nad Prosną
Gmina Mikstat	urban-rural	87.2	6,187	Mikstat
Gmina Kobyla Góra	rural	129.0	5,779	Kobyla Góra
Gmina Doruchów	rural	99.3	5,136	Doruchów
Gmina Kraszewice	rural	75.1	3,621	Kraszewice
Gmina Czajków	rural	70.8	2,584	Czajków
