= Reichsgau Wartheland =

Nazi administrative subdivision

Coordinates: 52°24′00″N 16°55′00″E

Reichsgau Wartheland Warthegau
- Reichsgau of Nazi Germany
- 1939–1945
- Flag

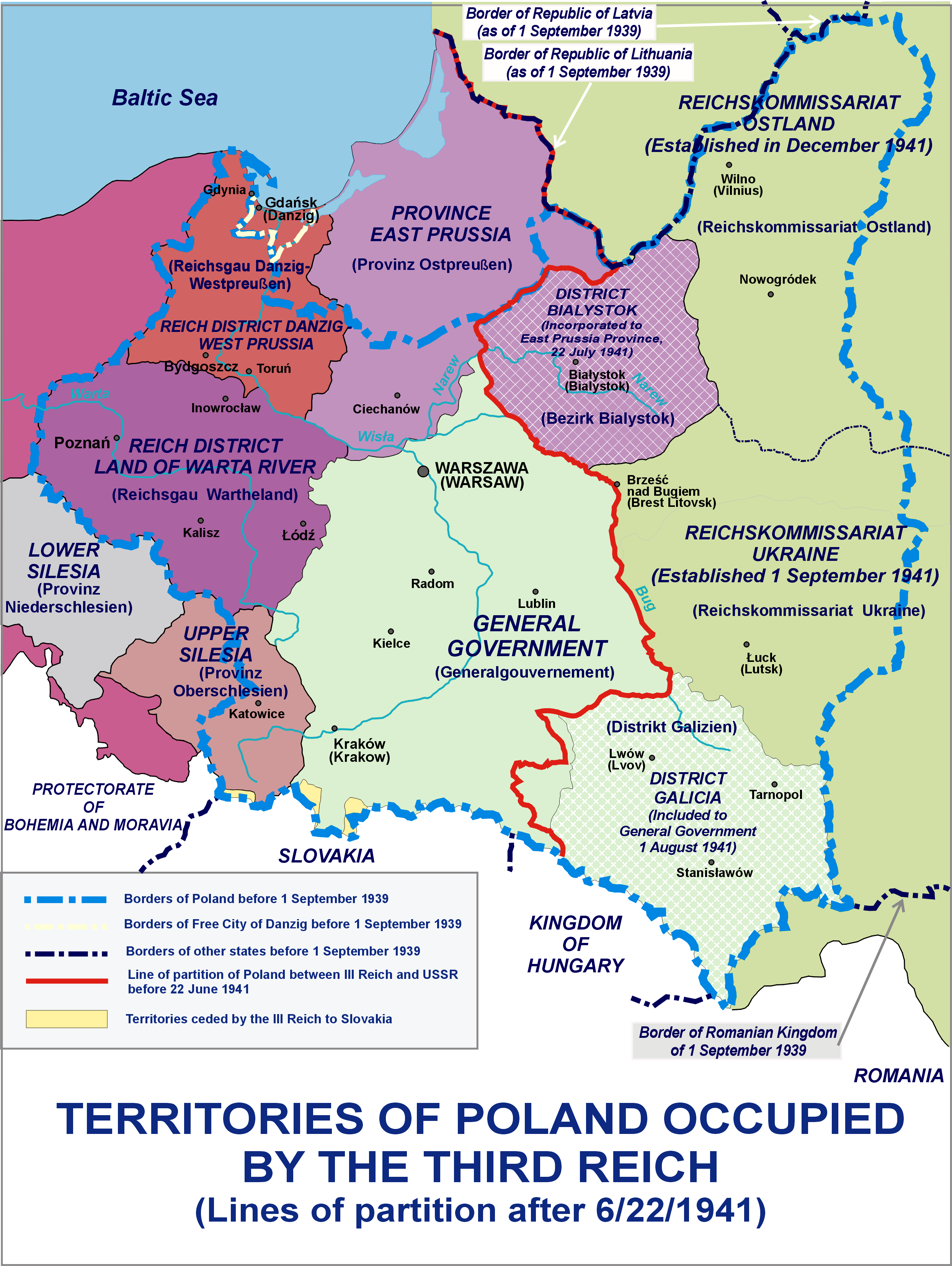
- Map of Nazi conquest showing administrative subdivisions (Gaue and Reichsgaue) with Warthegau area (bright yellow, right) Reichsgau Wartheland (burgundy) on the map of occupied Poland
- Capital: Posen
- Government
- Gauleiter
  - 1939–1945: Arthur Greiser
- History
  - Establishment: 8 October 1939
  - Disestablishment: 1 August 1945
Preceded by	Succeeded by
Poznań Voivodship	Provisional Government of the Republic of Poland
- Today part of: Poland

The Reichsgau Wartheland (initially Reichsgau Posen, also Warthegau) was a Nazi German Reichsgau formed from parts of Polish territory annexed in 1939 during World War II. It comprised the region of Greater Poland and adjacent areas. Parts of Warthegau matched the similarly named pre-Versailles Prussian province of Posen. The name was initially derived from the capital city, Posen (Poznań), and later from the main river, Warthe (Warta).

During the Partitions of Poland from 1793, the bulk of the area had been annexed by the Kingdom of Prussia until 1807 as South Prussia. From 1815 to 1849, the territory was within the autonomous Grand Duchy of Posen, which was the Province of Posen until Poland was re-established in 1918–1919 following World War I. The area is currently the Greater Poland Voivodeship.

== Establishment and administration ==
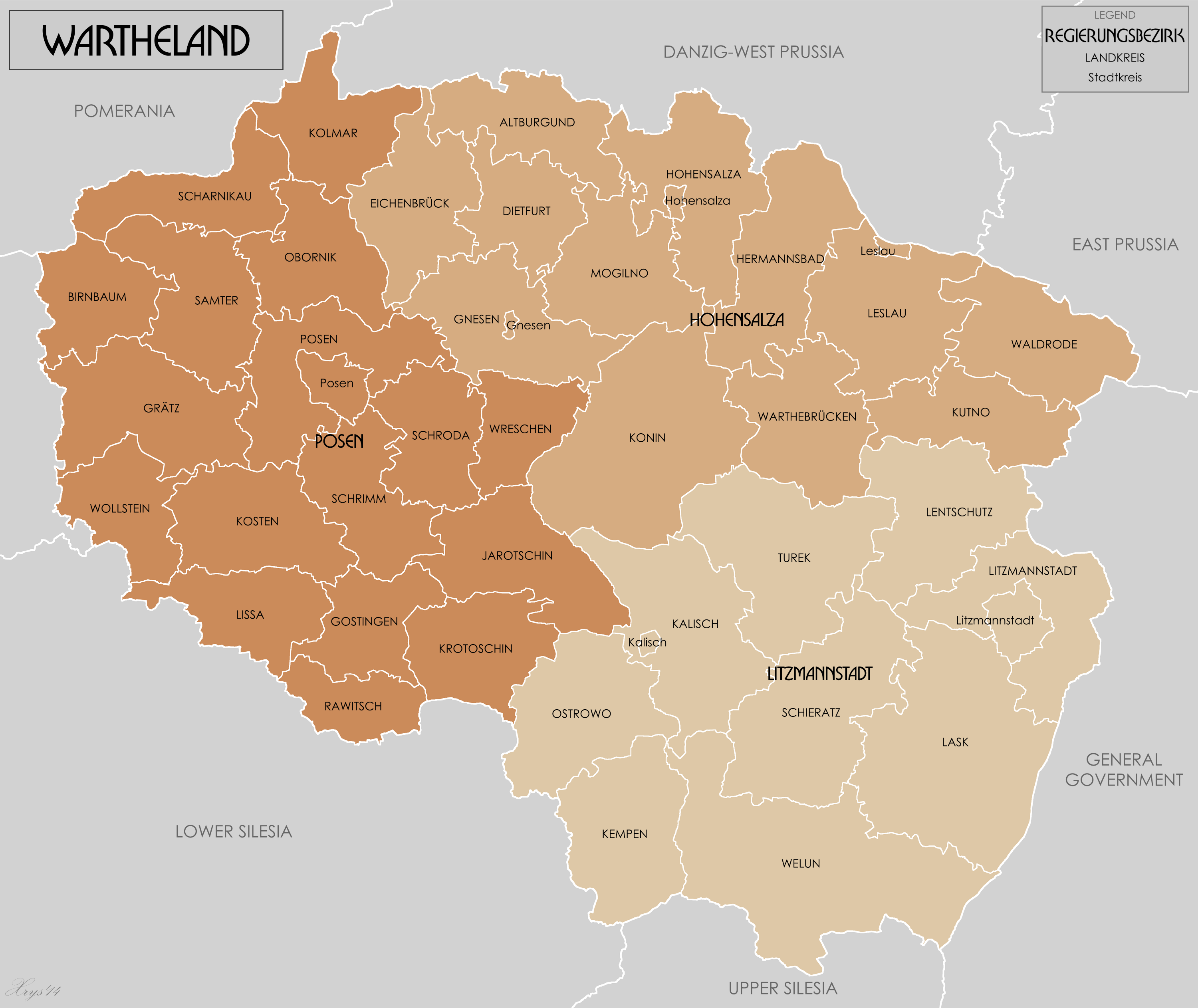
Counties (Regierungsbezirk) and districts (Kreis), 1944

After the German Wehrmacht invaded Poland in September 1939, the German Reich occupied the whole of the Greater Poland area - the erstwhile Polish Poznań Voivodeship - and split the territory between four Reichsgaue and the General Government area (further east). The Militärbezirk Posen was created in September 1939; in accordance with a decree of 8 October 1939, Germany annexed it on 26 October 1939 as the Reichsgau Posen. SS Obergruppenfuhrer Arthur Greiser became Gauleiter on 21 October. He would remain in this post until the end of the war in 1945. Reichsgau Posen was renamed "Reichsgau Wartheland" on 29 January 1940.

In the new Reichsgau Posen the Wehrmacht established Wehrkreis XXI, based at Poznań (German: Posen), under the command of General der Artillerie Walter Petzel. Its primary operational unit was the 48th Panzer Korps, covering so-called Militärische Unterregion-Hauptsitze including Posen (Polish: Poznań), Lissa (Polish: Leszno), Hohensalza (Polish: Inowrocław), Leslau (Polish: Włocławek), Kalisch (Polish: Kalisz), and Litzmannstadt (Polish: Łódź). It maintained training areas at Sieradz and Biedrusko. It also maintained the four main prisoner-of-war camps in the province, i.e. Stalag XXI-A in Ostrzeszów, Stalag XXI-B in Szubin, Stalag XXI-C in Wolsztyn and Stalag XXI-D in Poznań, which housed Polish, French, British, Dutch, Belgian, Serbian, Italian, Soviet, American, Norwegian, Moroccan, Algerian and French Sudanese prisoners of war.

== Nazi crimes and German colonization ==
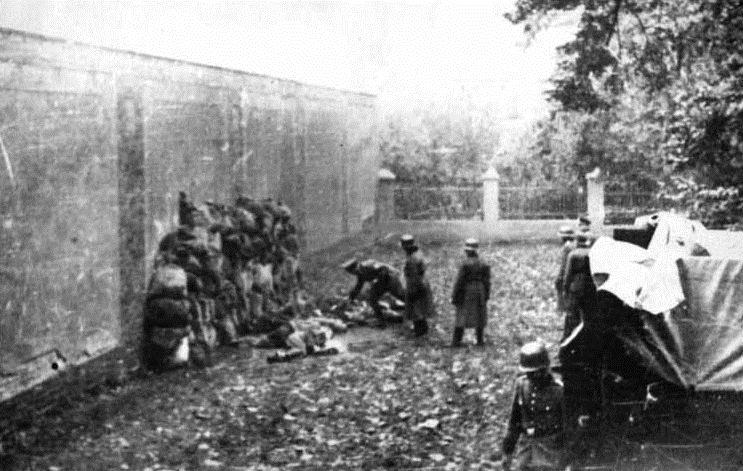
Mass execution of Poles in Leszno, 21 October 1939

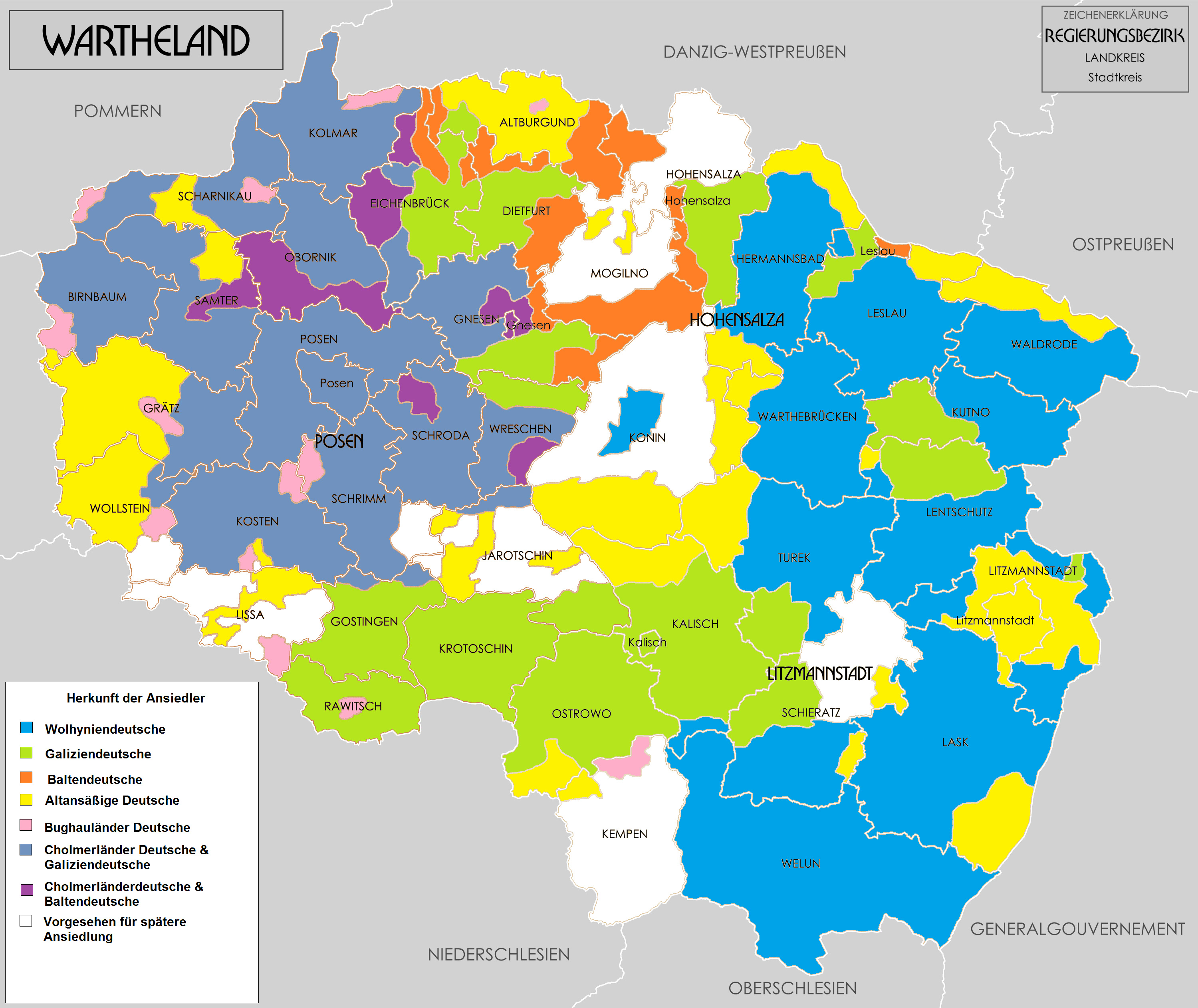
Origin of German settlers in the Warthegau. White indicates areas that were to be settled later.

The territory of the Reichsgau was inhabited predominantly by ethnic Poles, by German settlers (a minority of 16.7% in 1921), and by Polish Jews. The Polish population was subjected to various crimes, including the Intelligenzaktion genocidal campaign. On 20–23 October 1939 alone, the German police and Einsatzgruppe VI carried out mass public executions of some 300 Poles in various towns in the region, i.e. Gostyń, Kostrzyn, Kościan, Kórnik, Krobia, Książ Wielkopolski, Leszno, Mosina, Osieczna, Poniec, Śmigiel, Śrem, Środa and Włoszakowice, to terrorize and pacify the Poles. During Aktion T4, the SS-Sonderkommandos gassed over 2,700 mentally ill people from the psychiatric hospitals in Owińska, Dziekanka and Kościan.

Most of the Jewish residents were eventually imprisoned at the Łódź Ghetto (officially established in December 1939) and exterminated at Chełmno extermination camp (German: Vernichtungslager Kulmhof, operational from December 1941 onwards). From 1940, the occupiers also operated several forced labour camps for Jews in the region. Due to poor feeding and sanitary conditions, epidemics spread in those camps, which, combined with frequent executions, led to a high mortality rate. On the order of Heinrich Himmler, most of the camps were dissolved in 1943, and its surviving prisoners were sent to ghettos and death camps.

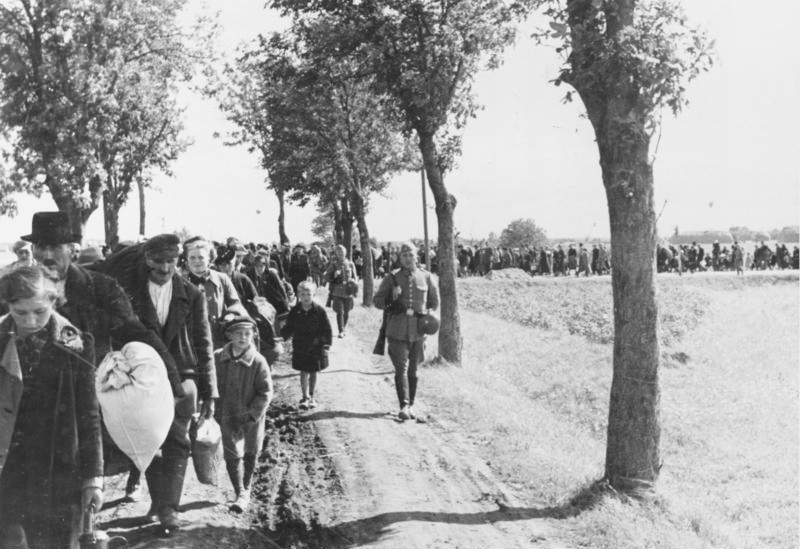
Poles being led to trains under German Army escort, as part of the ethnic cleansing of the areas of western Poland annexed to the Reich immediately following the invasion of 1939

The Gauleiter and Reichsstatthalter of Reichsgau Wartheland, native-born Arthur Greiser, embarked on a program of complete removal of the formerly Polish citizenry upon his nomination by Heinrich Himmler. The plan also entailed the re-settling of ethnic Germans from the Baltic and other regions into farms and homes formerly owned by Poles and Jews. He also authorized the clandestine operation of exterminating 100,000 Polish Jews (about one-third of the total Jewish population of Wartheland), in the process of the region's complete "Germanization". In the first year of World War II, some 630,000 Poles and Jews were forcibly removed from Wartheland and transported to the occupied General Government (more than 70,000 from Poznań alone) in a series of operations called the Kleine Planung covering most Polish territories annexed by Germany at about the same time. Both Poles and Jews had their property confiscated.

By the end of 1940, some 325,000 Poles and Jews from the Wartheland and the so-called Polish Corridor were expelled to General Government, often forced to abandon most of their belongings. Fatalities were numerous. Many Poles were also enslaved as forced labour and either sent to forced labour camps or German colonists in the region or deported to Germany and other German-occupied countries. In 1941, the Nazis expelled a further 45,000 people, and from autumn of that year, they began killing Jews by shooting and in gas vans, at first spasmodically and experimentally. Reichsgau Wartheland had the population: 4,693,700 by 1941. Greiser wrote in November 1942: "I myself do not believe that the Führer needs to be asked again in this matter, especially since at our last discussion with regard to the Jews he told me that I could proceed with these according to my own judgement."

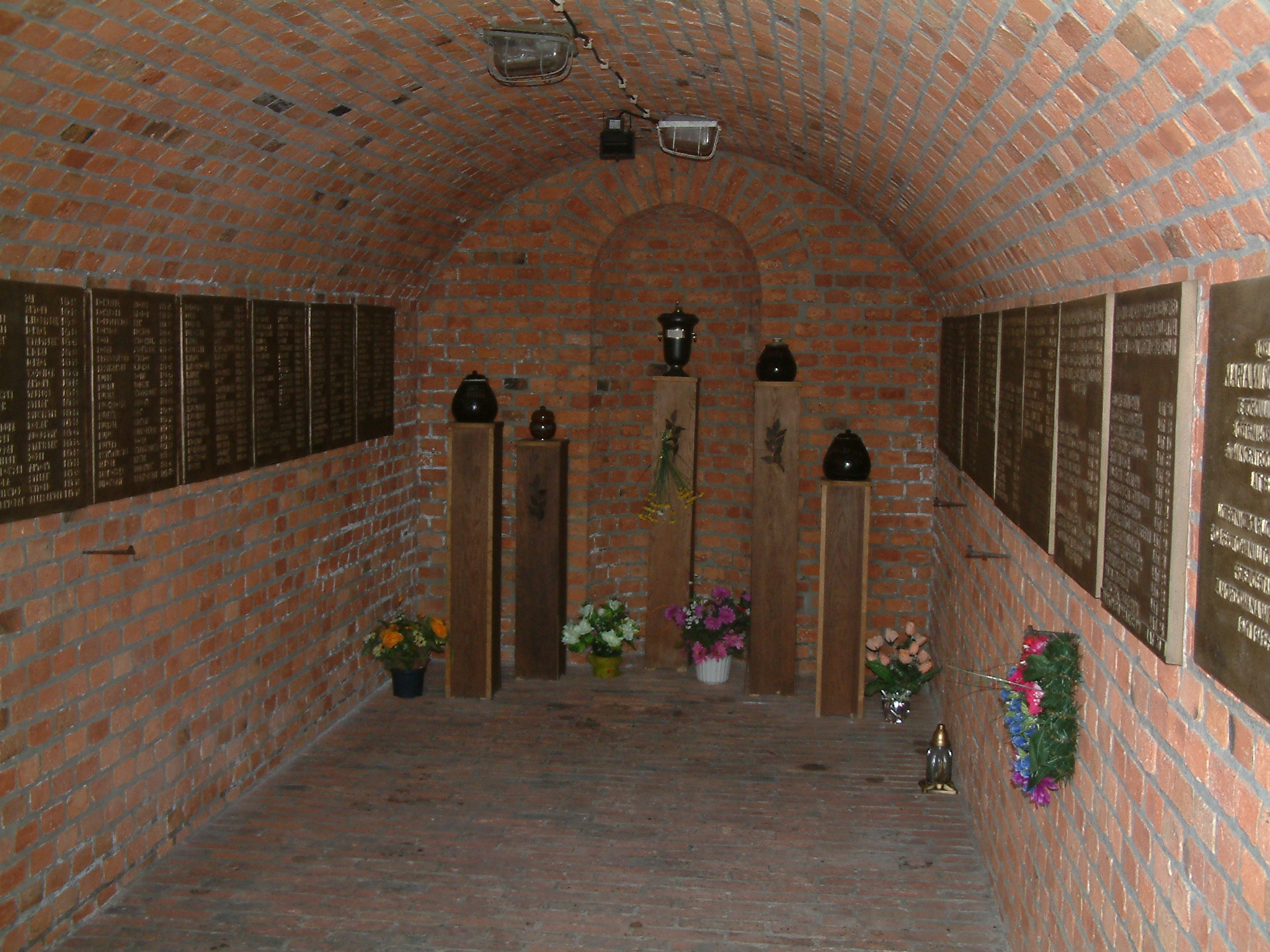
Bunker no. 16 in Fort VII in Poznań, used by the German occupiers as an improvised gas chamber

There were numerous camps and prisons in the province, including a subcamp of the Gross-Rosen concentration camp in Owińska, and a subcamp of the Stutthof concentration camp in Obrzycko. Particularly notorious camps and prisons included the Fort VII concentration camp in Poznań, the Radogoszcz prison in Łódź, a prison camp in Żabikowo, where mostly Poles were imprisoned, but also Luxembourgers, Dutch, Hungarians, Slovaks, Americans, Russians and deserters from the Wehrmacht, and many were tortured and executed, and the prison in Sieradz, whose mostly Polish and Jewish prisoners were subjected to insults, beatings, forced labour, tortures, executions, and were even given meals prepared from rotten vegetables, spoiled fish and dead dogs, thus often dying of exhaustion, starvation or torture.

Over 270,000 Polish children aged 10–18 were subjected to forced labour in the region of Greater Poland, which, in addition to German profits of 500 million marks, was aimed at the children's biological destruction. In Łódź, the occupiers operated a racial research camp for expelled Poles, and a concentration camp for kidnapped Polish children of two to 16 years of age from various parts of occupied Poland. In the racial research camp, Poles were subjected to racial selection before deportation to forced labour in Germany, and Polish children were taken from their parents and sent to Germanisation camps. The camp for kidnapped children served as a forced labour, penal and internment camp and racial research center, with the children subjected to starvation, exhausting labour, beating even up to death and diseases, and the camp was nicknamed "little Auschwitz" due to its conditions. Germanisation camps for Polish children taken away from their parents were operated in Kalisz, Poznań, Puszczykowo and Zaniemyśl. The children were given new German names and surnames, and were punished for any use of the Polish language, even with death. After their stay in the camps, the children were deported to Germany; only some returned to Poland after the war, while the fate of many remains unknown to this day.

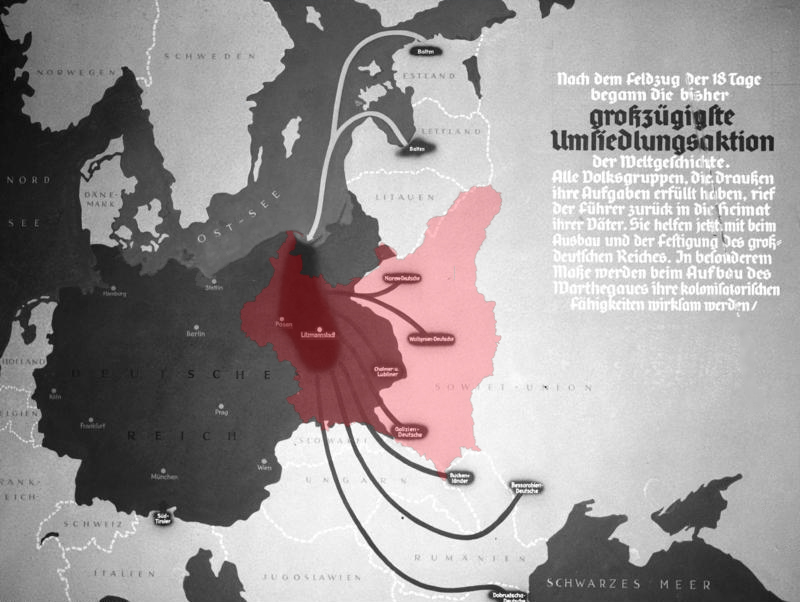
Heim ins Reich re-settlement in Warthegau. Map of the Third Reich in 1939 (dark grey) after the conquest of Poland; with pockets of German colonists brought into Reichsgau Wartheland from the Soviet "sphere of influence" – superimposed with the red outline of Poland missing entirely from the original print.

== Polish resistance ==
The Polish resistance movement was active in the region, including the Union of Armed Struggle, Bataliony Chłopskie, Gray Ranks and Home Army. The Polish Underground State was organized, and in July 1940, even an underground Polish parliament was established in Poznań. Activities included secret Polish schooling, secret Catholic services, printing and distribution of Polish underground press, sabotage actions, espionage of German activity, military trainings, production of false documents, preparations for a planned uprising, and even secret football games. The Polish resistance provided aid to people in need, including prisoners, escapees from camps and ghettos and deserters from the German army, rescued Polish children kidnapped by the Germans, and facilitated escapes of Allied prisoners of war from German POW camps. The Germans cracked down on the resistance several times, and even kidnapped children of the resistance members and sent them to the camp for Polish children in Łódź.

== End of war ==
From August 1944 to January 1945, the Germans used hundreds of thousands of Poles as forced labour to build fortifications in the region ahead of the advancing Eastern Front. In January 1945, before and during their retreat, the Germans committed several further massacres of Polish civilians, prisoners and Polish and other Allied POWs, including at Ostrzeszów, Pleszew, Marchwacz, Żabikowo and Łomnica and perpetrated several death marches.

By 1945 nearly half a million Germanic Volksdeutsche had been resettled in the Warthegau alone among the areas annexed by Germany while the Soviet forces began to push the retreating German forces back through the Polish lands. Most German residents along with over a million colonists fled westward. Some did not, due to restrictions by Germany's own government and the quickly advancing Red Army. An estimated 50,000 refugees died from the severe winter conditions, others as war atrocities committed by the Soviet military. The remaining ethnically German population was expelled to Allied-occupied Germany after the war ended in accordance with the Potsdam Agreement.

== See also ==
- History of Poland (1939–1945)
- World War II atrocities in Poland
- Special Prosecution Book-Poland
- Intelligenzaktion
- Volksdeutscher Selbstschutz

== Sources ==
- Shoa.de - List of Gaue and Gauleiter (in German)
- Die NS Gaue at the Deutsches Historisches Museum website (in German)
- Die Gaue der NSDAP (in German)
