= Władysław Golus Regional Museum in Ostrzeszów =

World War II museum in Poland

- Muzeum Regionalne im. Władysława Golusa
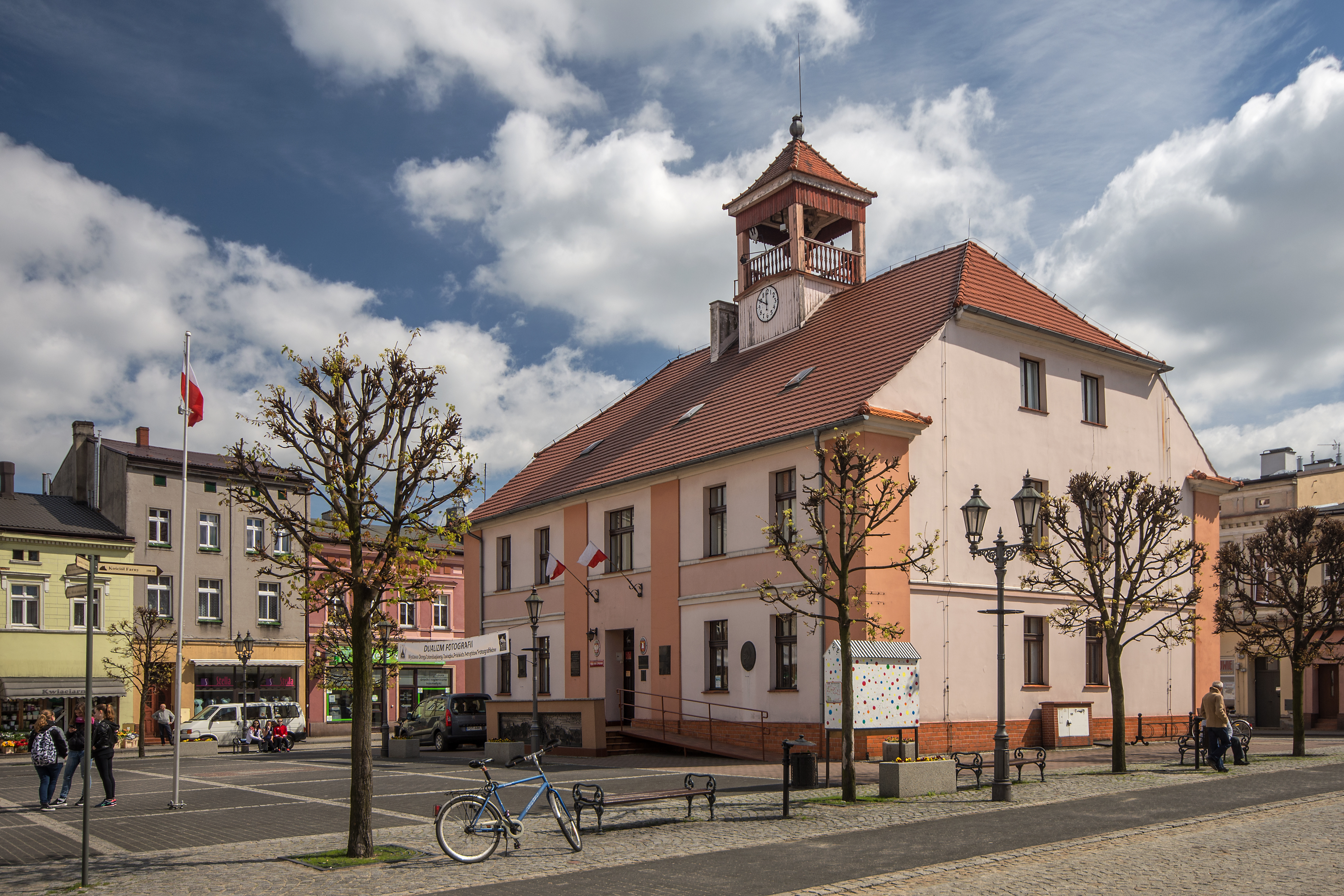
- Old town hall which hosts the museum

- Location within Poland
- Established: 1979
- Location: Ostrzeszów, Poland
- Coordinates: 51°25′33″N 17°55′59″E
- Collections: Historical, archaeological, ethnographic, numismatic artifacts and art
- Collection size: 8,000

Władysław Golus Regional Museum (Polish: Muzeum Regionalne im. Władysława Golusa) is a museum in Ostrzeszów, Poland. Located at the local town hall, it contains historical, archaeological, ethnographic, numismatic and art collections, including an exhibition devoted to the history of Norwegian World War II prisoners of war once interned in the Oflag XXI-C POW camp in Ostrzeszów in German-occupied Poland.

Other chief collections include the works of painter Antoni Serbeński and artifacts from the Greater Poland uprising of 1918–1919.

== Exhibition devoted to Norwegian POWs from World War II ==
=== Beginnings ===
In 1982, Eyvind Grundt from Moss, Norway, was sent to Poland on a mission for the Norwegian Red Cross. After completing his work, he began a search for the town where his father had spent two years as a Prisoner of War (POW) during World War II. It was a difficult task, since he only knew the German name of the town, Schildberg.

After many inquiries, Grundt found that Schildberg was a small Polish city of Ostrzeszów. In Ostrzeszów, by chance, he made contact with Lechoslaw Nowakowski, a language professor at the local college. Nowakowski had a good knowledge of the history of the town and shared Grundt's interest in the fate of the 1,150 Norwegian POWs once interned there at Stalag XXI-A.

They discovered that Grundt’s father had been interned in the building that now houses the town’s largest technical school. In the cellar of the school, several Norwegian artifacts were discovered, including a dented tin plate engraved “Kaptein Vagn Enger”. Grundt contacted the manager of the local museum, Josef Janas and they agreed to create a small Norwegian collection in the museum. Initially, it was in the right drawer of the manager’s desk.

=== Exhibits ===
Since 1982, a number of objects connected to the Norwegian POWs have been collected, in both Norway and Poland. Several special exhibitions to present them were arranged at first, but from 1996 onwards, the Norwegian collection has had a permanent exhibition area in the newly renovated Ostrzeszów museum. The collection of objects continues, and the museum has developed into an information and competence centre concerning Norwegian POWs in general. The museum is engaged in collecting the abundant literature relating to the subject.

What makes the Norwegian POW Museum especially unique is photographic collection of one of the former POWs of the Ostrzeszów camp. After managing to smuggle a small camera into the camp, the prisoner used chocolate and cigarettes from his Red Cross parcels to “buy” film from the German guards. Thus he could document many aspects of POW life in a unique way. Many of his photographs have been enlarged and cover the walls in the museum.

It is rather unusual to find a Norwegian museum far outside the borders of the country. The inhabitants of Ostrzeszów are proud of being able to display the unique history that they and Norway share. In 2003 more than 6,000 people visited the POW museum; including Polish and Norwegian families and individuals. The museum intends to publish several booklets covering the fate of the POWs. Information will also be published on the internet.

=== Scope ===
The museum covers the military POWs in the local Stalag XXI-A, as well as camps of Oflag XXI-C in Skoki, Oflag XXI-C/Z in Gronówko and Stalag III-A and Oflag III-A of Luckenwalde.

The museum has future plans to cover POWs in Stalag Luft III in Żagań and Marlag und Milag Nord in Westertimke. Later still, other groups of prisoners, such as interned civilians, police prisoners and students will be covered. Prisoners in KZ- and NN-camps, in hard labour camps and jails (political prisoners and “criminals”), as well as prisoners in Norway, will not be included.
