= Leif Frode Onarheim =

Norwegian businessperson and politician (1934–2021)

Leif Frode Onarheim (23 August 1934 – 9 September 2021) was a Norwegian businessperson and politician for the Conservative Party.

Onarheim was board member and chair of several enterprises. He served as President of the Federation of Norwegian Industries, and later of the Confederation of Norwegian Enterprise. He was appointed rector of the BI Norwegian Business School, and was elected member of the Storting from 2001 to 2005.

== Biography ==
=== Early life ===
Onarheim was born in Vestre Toten Municipality as the son of businessman Frode M. A. Onarheim (1900–1985) and housewife Lillemor Høst (1902–1990). He attended primary and secondary school in Hamar, Bekkelaget and Gjøvik. He took his higher education at various institutions, including one year at the Valdosta State College from 1955 to 1956, but from 1957 he studied at the Norwegian School of Economics and Business Administration, graduating with the siv.øk. degree in 1960.

In December 1958 he married Anne Helene Nygaard, nicknamed Annemor. She has been active in local politics.

=== Business career ===
In 1960 he started his professional career as salesman. From 1965 to 1967 he worked at the Indo-Norwegian Project on development aid in Kerala. In 1970 he became chief executive officer of Nora-Sunrose, and in 1981 chief executive officer of Nora Industrier. From 1981 to 1983 he also presided over the employers' association Federation of Norwegian Industries, having been vice president from 1979 to 1981.

In 1991 he left the post as chief executive to become chair of Orkla ASA, following the merger between Nora and Orkla. He held this position for one year. From 1992 to 1993 he was the vice president of the Confederation of Norwegian Enterprise. He was then the rector of the Norwegian School of Management from 1993 to 1997, and the president of Confederation of Norwegian Enterprise from 1997 to 2001.

He was also the chair of H. Aschehoug & Co from 1991 to 2001, Narvesen from 1993 to 2001, Netcom from 1995 to 2001, Sponsor Service from 2000 to 2001, Løvenskiold Vækerø from 2000 to 2007 as well as Norges Varemesse, Helly Hansen, Bjølsen Valsemølle, Nidar Bergene, Idun, Nora Mineralvann, Nora Eiendom, Norgeskreditt and Vingmed Holding. He has been a board member of Fjeldhammer Brug (vice chair), Forenede Forsikring, Wilh. Wilhelmsen, Standard Telefon og Kabelfabrik and Volvo Norge.

=== Political career ===
Onarheim was elected to the Parliament of Norway from Akershus in 2001, but was not re-elected in 2005. During his term he was a member of the Standing Committee on Energy and the Environment.

He then decided to return to the business world. He was the chair of Fjord Seafood from 2005 to 2006, and then a board member of Marine Harvest from 2006. He was also the acting chief executive of Marine Harvest from 2007 to 2008, as well as a member of the board of Akershus University Hospital and Innovation Norway from 2006. In January 2010 he became acting deputy chairman of Marine Harvest, as Svein Aaser suddenly stepped down. In 2007 he agreed, somewhat surprisingly, to be a part of the Conservative Party ballot in Asker Municipality for the 2007 local election. As it turned out, he was elected to the municipal council for the term 2007 to 2011. As of 2007 he was the wealthiest politician in Asker Municipality and Bærum Municipality, ahead of businessman and fellow Conservative representative Stein H. Annexstad. In 1986 he was proclaimed a Knight, First Class of the Royal Norwegian Order of St. Olav.

=== Death ===
Onarheim died on 9 September 2021, at the age of 87.
