= Idun (disambiguation) =

Idun is an alternate spelling of Iðunn, a goddess in Norse mythology.

It may also refer to:

== Places ==
- alternate spelling of Aydoun, a Jordanian city
- Idun Peak, Antarctica
- Idun Township, Aitkin County, Minnesota

== People ==
- Idun Reiten (1942–2025), Norwegian professor of mathematics
- Connor Idun (born 2000), Australian rules footballer
- James Idun (born 1963), Ghanaian sprinter

== Other uses ==
- Idun Industri, a Norwegian company
- Livsforsikringsselskapet Idun, a Norwegian company
- Idun (magazine), a Swedish magazine
- Viking Idun, a Viking Cruises ship
- Idun (horse), American racehorse
- Idun language of Nigeria
- Idun (icebreaker), a Swedish icebreaker
