= Frode Onarheim =

Norwegian businessman (1900–1985)

Frode Morten Andreas Onarheim (6 January 1900 – 3 April 1985) was a Norwegian military officer and businessperson.

== Personal life ==
He was born in Bekkelaget as a son of Samson Onarheim (1863–1949) and pianist Astrid Onarheim, née Johannessen (1870–1944). In 1926 he married merchant's daughter Lorentze "Lillemor" Høst. They had the son Leif Frode Onarheim.

== Career ==
After finishing his secondary education in 1918 he completed officer training at the Norwegian Military Academy in 1921 as a premier lieutenant in the field artillery. He took the Norwegian Military College in 1923. He then graduated in machine engineering from the Technische Hochschule in Zurich in 1926.

He was hired as a controlling officer at Raufoss Ammunisjonsfabrikk in 1926, and became acting head of department before advancing to managing engineer in 1930 and head of department in 1934. In 1941 he became a chief engineer at Hamar Jernstøperi og Mekaniske Verksted, because the occupying Germans started taking control of Raufoss Ammunisjonsfabrikk. Onarheim, who had also fought in the Norwegian Campaign, was later imprisoned from August 1943 to 1945 in the officer prisoner-of-war camps Schildberg and Luckenwalde.

He returned to Raufoss Ammunisjonsfabrikk in 1945, went on to be second-in-command of Hærens våpentekniske korps in 1946, before returning as chief executive officer of Raufoss Ammunisjonsfabrikk from 1950 to his retirement in 1962.

While studying in Zurich he chaired the rowing club Nordiska Roddföreningen i Zürich from 1924 to 1925. He later headed the arranging committee of the Norwegian skiing championships in 1940. As a military officer he advanced to captain in 1931 and lieutenant colonel in 1946. After the Second World War he was decorated with the Defence Medal 1940–1945.

He was active in Standards Norway and was a board member of Raufoss Privatbank from 1951 to 1963 (chair from 1962) and Hunselvens brukseierforening from 1951 to 1962. He was a supervisory council member of Kjøbmandsbanken. He died in April 1985 and was buried in Nordstrand.
