= Annexstad =

Annexstad is a surname. Notable people with the surname include:

- Albert T. Annexstad, American businessman and philanthropist
- Stein H. Annexstad (born 1944), Norwegian businessperson and politician
- Zack Annexstad (born 2000), American football player

== See also ==
- Annexstad Lake
- Annexstad Peak
