= Ostrzeszów =

Town in Greater Poland Voivodeship, Poland

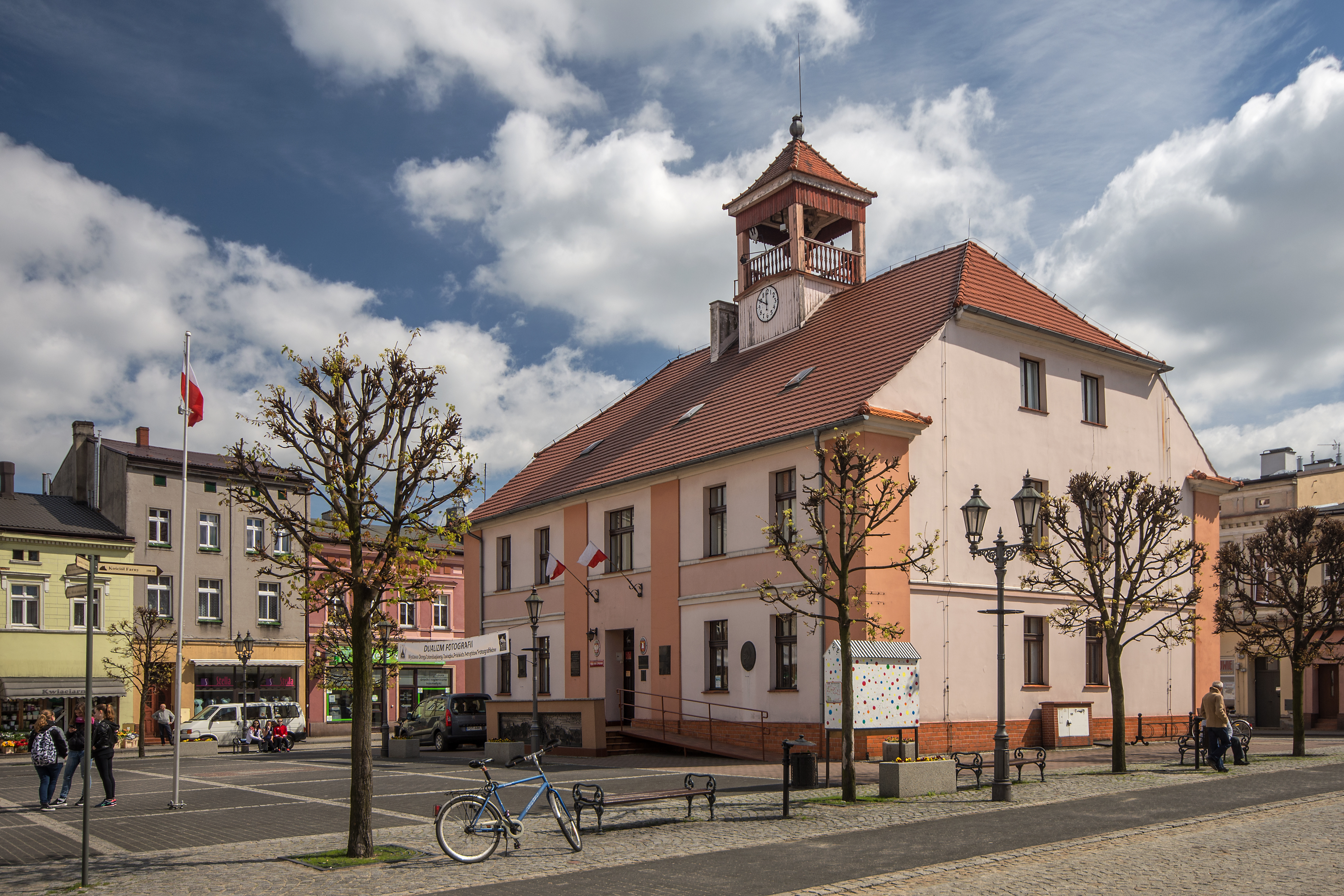
- Town hall

- Flag Coat of arms

- Location within Poland
- Coordinates: 51°25′N 17°56′E
- Country: Poland
- Voivodeship: Greater Poland
- County: Ostrzeszów
- Gmina: Ostrzeszów
- Town rights: between 1261 and 1283

Government
  - Mayor: Patryk Jędrowiak

Area
  - Total: 12.18 km^{2} (4.70 sq mi)

Population (2024)
  - Total: 13 933
  - Density: 1.1/km^{2} (2.8/sq mi)
- Time zone: UTC+1 (CET)
  - Summer (DST): UTC+2 (CEST)
- Postal code: 63-500
- Area code: +48 62
- Car plates: POT
- Website: http://www.ostrzeszow.pl

Ostrzeszów (Polish pronunciation: [ɔstˈʂɛʂuf]) is a town in south-central Poland, in Greater Poland Voivodeship. It is the capital of Ostrzeszów County. The population in 2023 was 14,095 inhabitants. The town is situated around 80 kilometres (50 miles) from Wrocław, 170 km (106 miles) from Katowice and 160 km (99 miles) from Poznań.

Founded in the Middle Ages, Ostrzeszów is a former Polish royal town located in the historical Wieluń Land that owed its prosperity to crafts and trade. It became more internationally known for being the site of German-operated prisoner-of-war camps for Allied soldiers and officers of various nationalities, chiefly Polish, French, British and Norwegian, during the German occupation of Poland in World War II. One of Ostrzeszów's honorary citizens is Krzysztof Wielicki, who climbed all of the world's mountains of over 8,000 metres (26,247 feet) in height.

== History ==
=== Early history ===
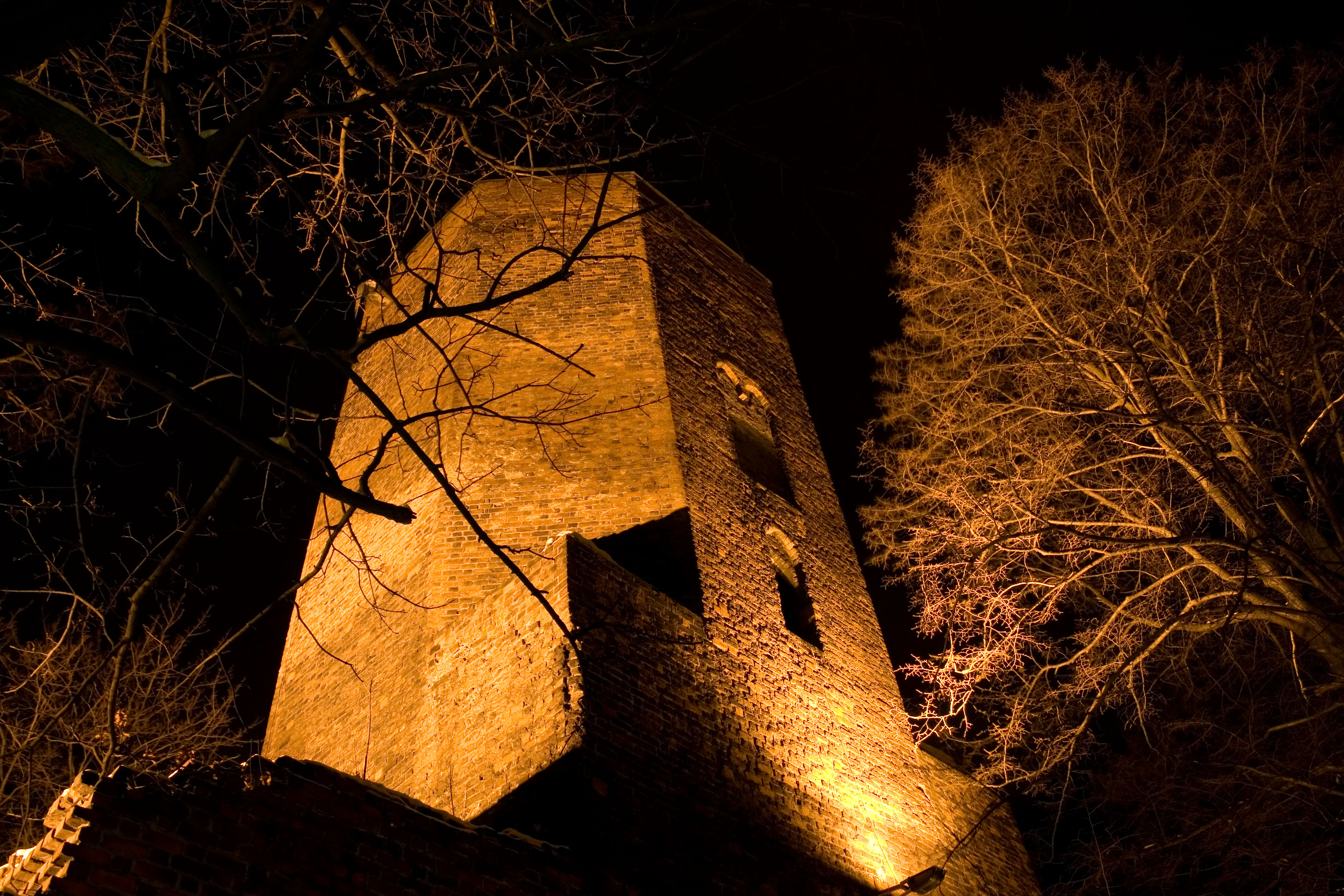
Medieval castle tower at night

The settlement of Ostrzeszów predates the advent of Christianity in Poland in 966. In antiquity, the Amber Road ran through the area. Ostrzeszów acquired town privileges sometime between 1261 and 1283, when it first appears in historical records. In the 14th century, Polish King Casimir III the Great erected a castle, defensive town walls and the Gothic church of the Assumption of Mary. The town's coat of arms was probably granted by Casimir's successor Louis the Hungarian. It contains the head of the crowned white eagle from the coat of arms of Poland. Ostrzeszów was a Polish royal town and county seat within the Sieradz Voivodeship in the Greater Poland Province.

During the 16th to 18th centuries it was the seat of district courts. Ostrzeszów prospered in the early modern era, multiple craft guilds were founded and trade flourished until the Swedes destroyed the castle and the town in 1656 during the Swedish invasion of Poland (Deluge). The town declined as a result.

=== Late modern period ===
It was annexed by Prussia in the Second Partition of Poland in 1793. In 1807 it was regained by Poles and included within the short-lived Duchy of Warsaw, in 1815 it was reannexed by Prussia, and from 1871 to 1918 it was part of Germany, however, in the early 20th century its population was still predominantly Polish. Under Prussian and German rule, the eagle in the coat of arms was changed to the black eagle from the coat of arms of Prussia. In the mid-19th century, four annual fairs were held in the town and the local populace was mainly employed in tanning.

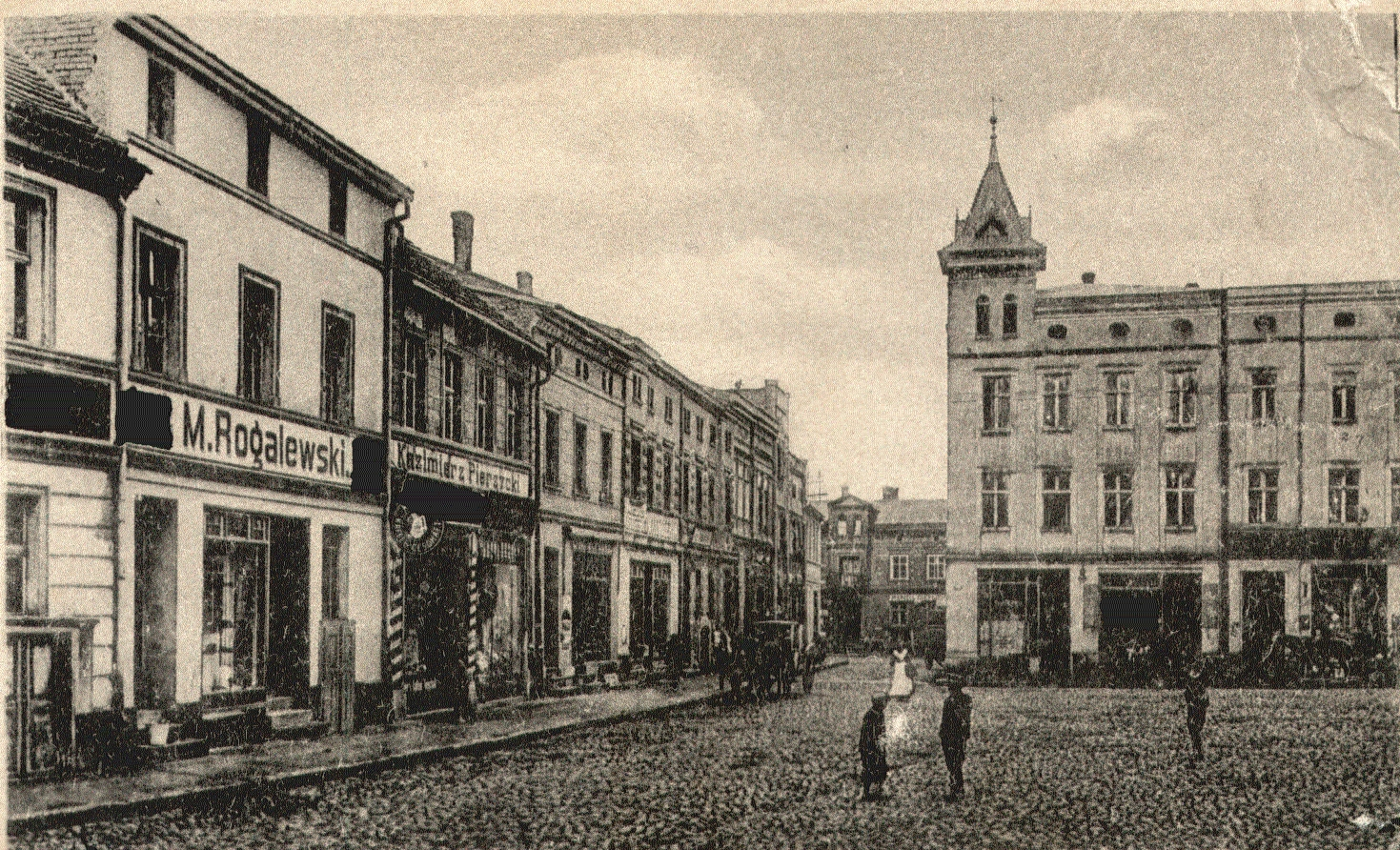
Old photo of the Market Square in Ostrzeszów

In 1879, Bank Ludowy, a local Polish-owned bank, was founded. The bank was the main place for secret meetings of the Polish resistance movement until the liberation of Ostrzeszów in 1919. It financially supported all social and patriotic actions of local Polish associations to resist Germanisation policies, including secret Polish education. Poles struggled to maintain the leadership of the local fire department, successfully. In the early 20th century, local Polish children joined the children school strikes against Germanisation that spread throughout the Prussian Partition of Poland. In 1914, a Polish scout troop was established in the town.

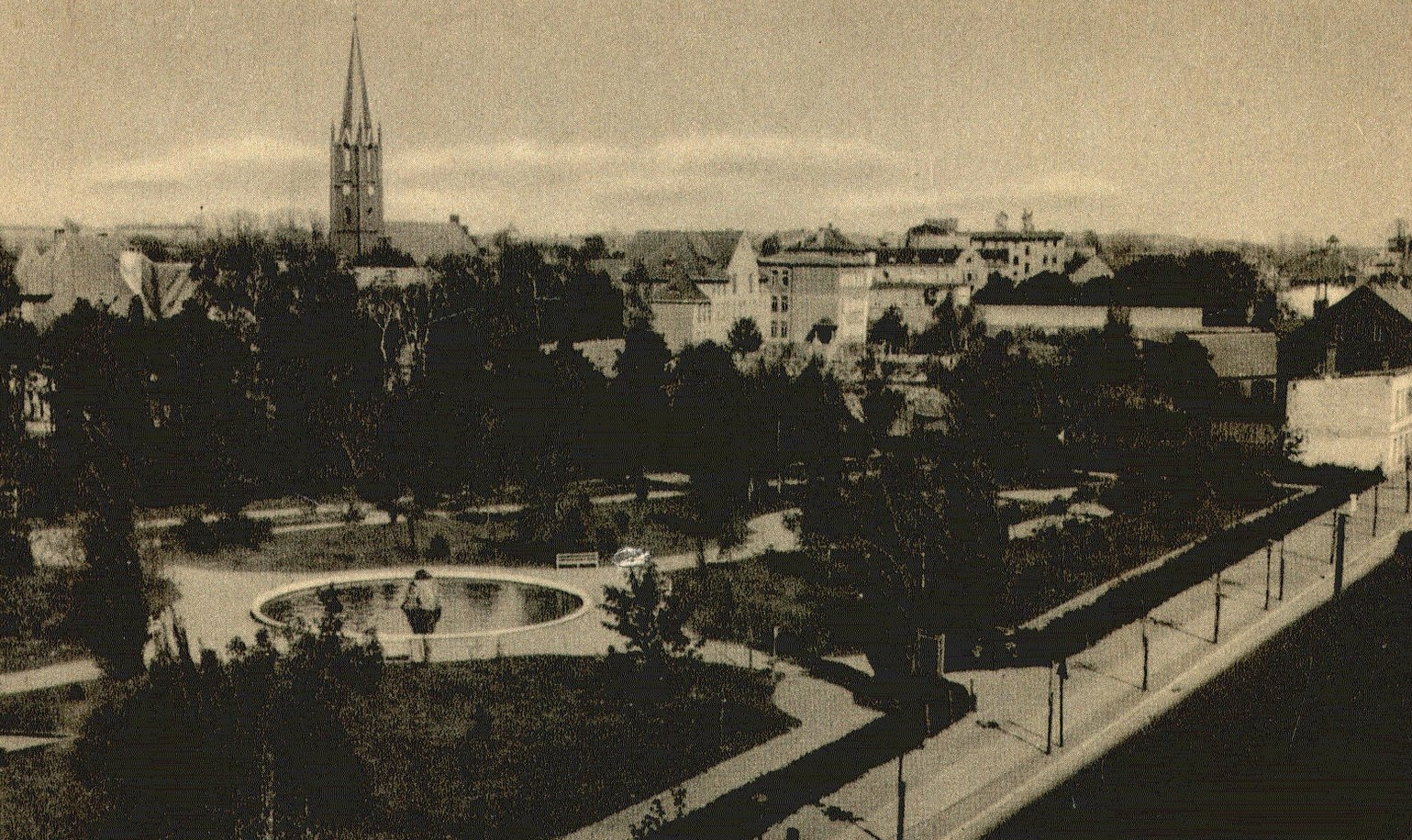
Park in Ostrzeszów in the 1930s

After World War I, in November 1918, Poland regained independence and the Greater Poland Uprising broke out, which goal was to reintegrate the town and region with the reborn Polish state. Local Poles made secret preparations for the uprising in November and December 1918. Polish insurgents liberated the town on January 1, 1919, and a local insurgent unit marched out of the town on January 7 to fight in other areas. In interwar Poland, the town's historic Polish coat of arms was restored.

=== World War II ===
During the German invasion of Poland, which started World War II, the Einsatzgruppe III entered the town on September 6–7, 1939, to commit various crimes against Poles. During the subsequent German occupation it was annexed directly to Nazi Germany, and was administered within the newly formed province of Reichsgau Wartheland.

Germany operated a Dulag transit camp in various buildings throughout the town from September 1939. Some 22,000 Polish prisoners of war and 12,000 Polish civilians passed through the camp. Also Franciscans from Niepokalanów were held there, including Maximilian Kolbe, who was later killed in the Auschwitz concentration camp and is now considered a saint of the Catholic Church. Conditions in the overcrowded camp were poor, food was scarce and medical aid was practically nonexistent, thus local Poles smuggled food, clothing, shoes, blankets and books for the camp's inmates, as well as assisted in escapes from the camp. In retaliation, the Germans carried out the first expulsions of Poles already in September and December 1939, and murdered a number of Polish hostages from Ostrzeszów during the large massacres of Poles in Winiary. From 1940 Polish, French and English POWs were held in the camp and in 1942 also Yugoslavs. Local Poles continued their assistance to Polish and Allied POWs, by smuggling medical and sanitary supplies, and even invisible ink so that POWs could report the true conditions of the camp in letters to their families. In 1943 the camp was converted to Oflag XXI-C for 1,130 Norwegian officers, but also for Dutch, Italian, Serbian and Soviet POWs. The Germans also operated a Nazi prison in the town from 1942 to 1944.

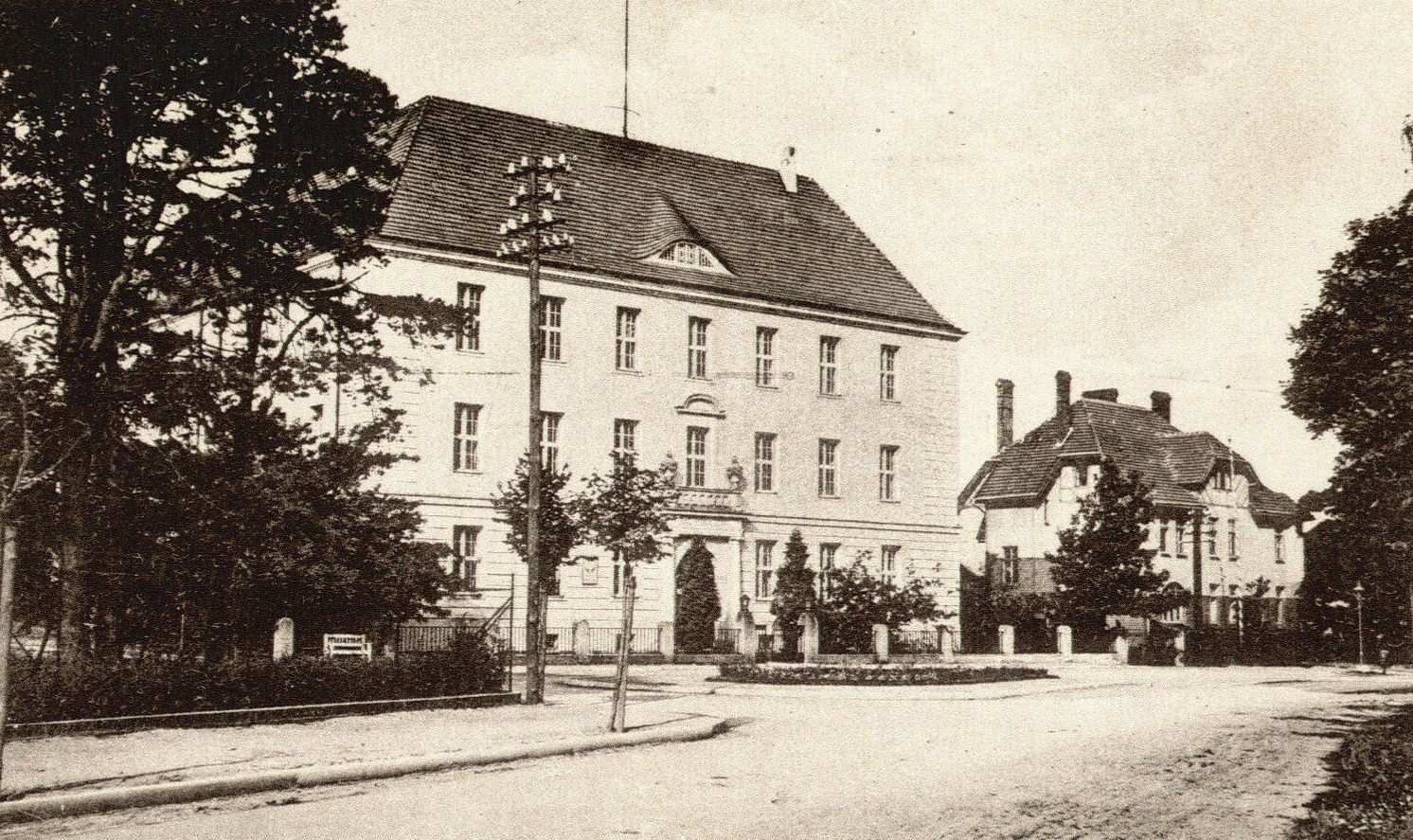
Pre-war view of the former courthouse and tax office, which under German occupation housed the Stalag XXI-A POW camp guards' quarters and the POW infectious disease hospital, respectively

In the meantime, the Germans closed Polish schools and continued the expulsion of Poles, with the aim of Germanizing the town in accordance with the Lebensraum policy. Polish children from the age of 12 were deported to forced labour to Germany. By 1943, some 60% of the Polish population was expelled. Three graduates of the local high school, a graduate of the local teachers' college and a local school teacher were murdered by the Russians in the Katyn massacre in 1940.

In 1940, a local unit of the Polish Secret Military Organization was established, which was eventually merged with the Home Army. Its activities included espionage of German operations, sabotage actions, preparations for an uprising, printing and distribution of Polish underground press, which was also smuggled to the Stalag XXI-A, smuggling either radios or parts to build radios to British and Norwegian POWs, assisting POWs in escaping the camp, and providing aid to the most affected local families. The few teachers who were not expelled organized secret Polish schooling for the remaining Polish children. Throughout the occupation, the Germans arrested 80 Polish resistance members and sent them to Nazi concentration camps or prisons.

Shortly before retreating, on January 20, 1945, the Germans carried out a massacre of 14 Poles in the town, and the next day Soviet forces captured the town, which was then restored to Poland, although with a Soviet-installed communist regime, which then stayed in power until the Fall of Communism in the 1980s.

=== Post-war period ===
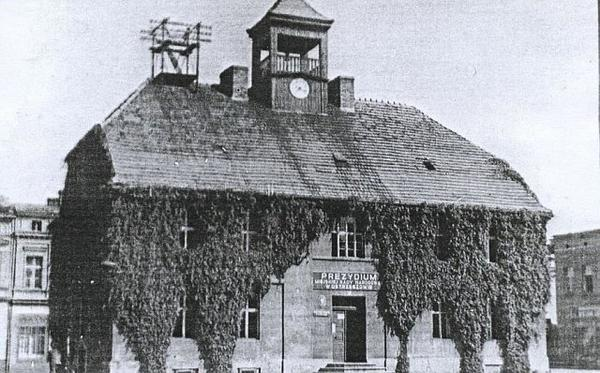
Town hall after 1945

In July 1980, employees of the local mechanical equipment factory joined the nationwide anti-communist strikes, which led to the foundation of the "Solidarity" organization.

== Demographics ==
Historical population

Year	Pop.	±%
1910	5,471	—
1921	5,413	−1.1%
1931	5,833	+7.8%
1939	6,246	+7.1%

Year	Pop.	±%
1950	5,693	−8.9%
1960	7,357	+29.2%
2010	14,369	+95.3%

== Sights ==
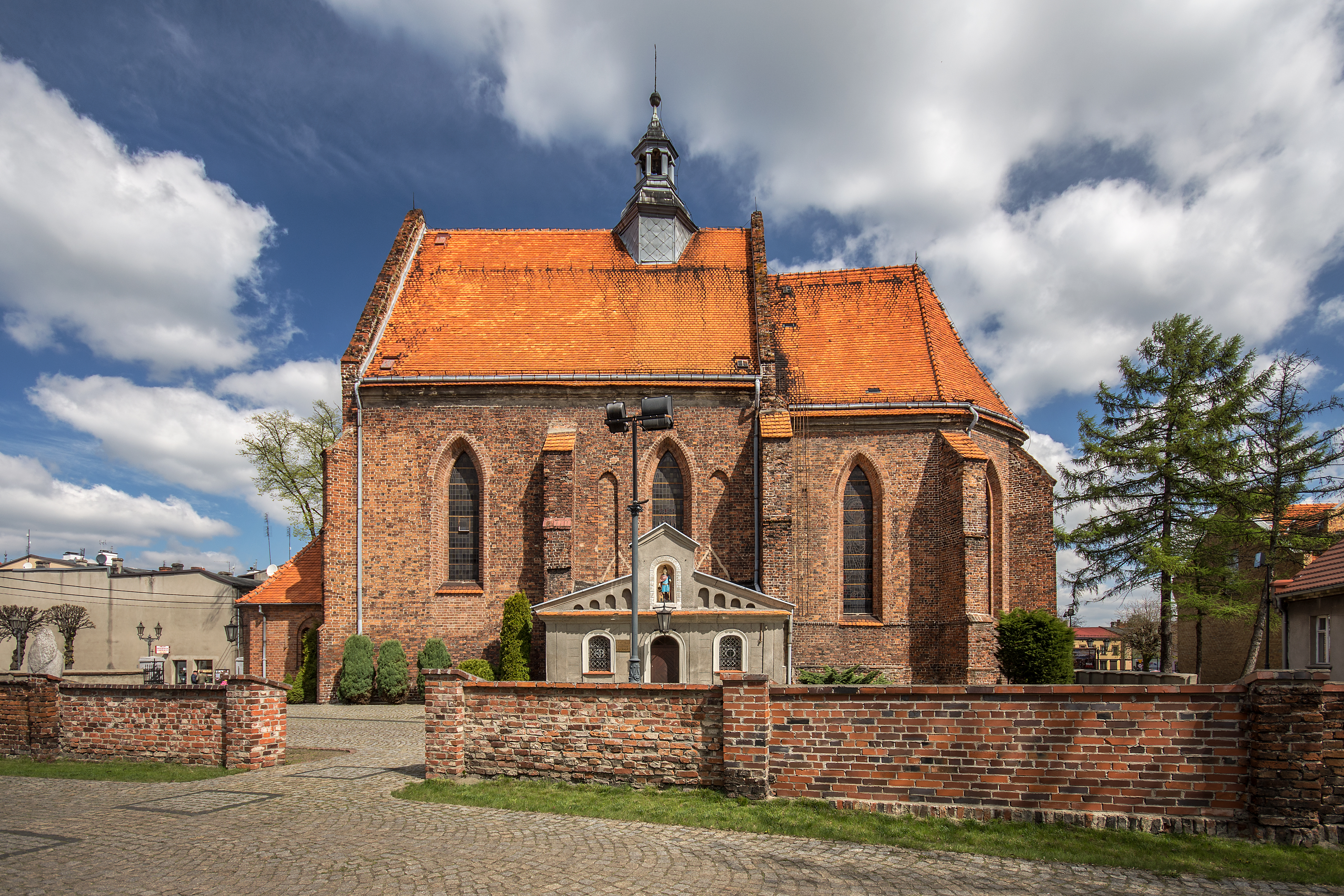
Gothic church of the Assumption of Mary

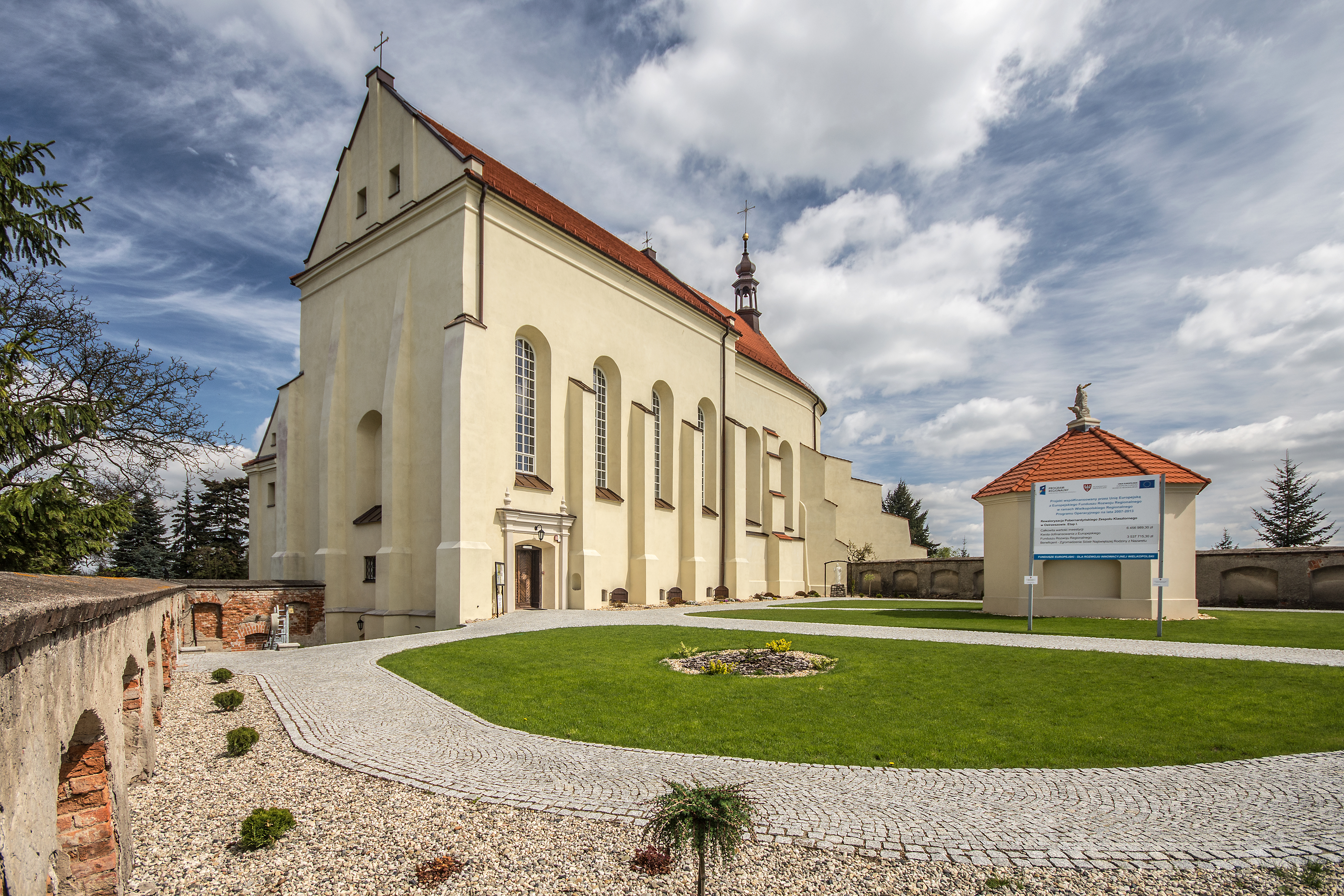
Baroque Holy Family of Nazareth monastery

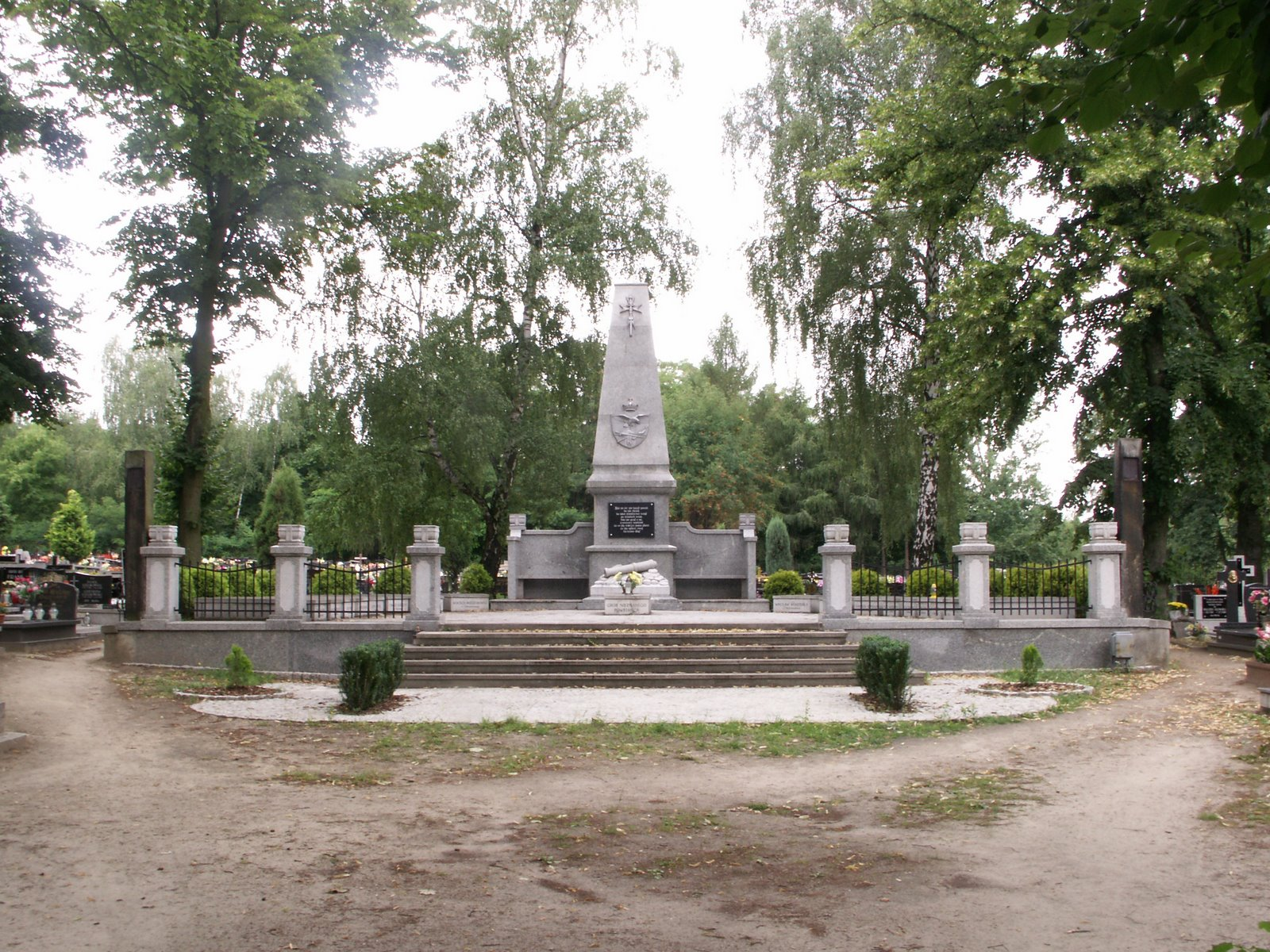
Monument to Polish insurgents of the Greater Poland Uprising (1918–19)

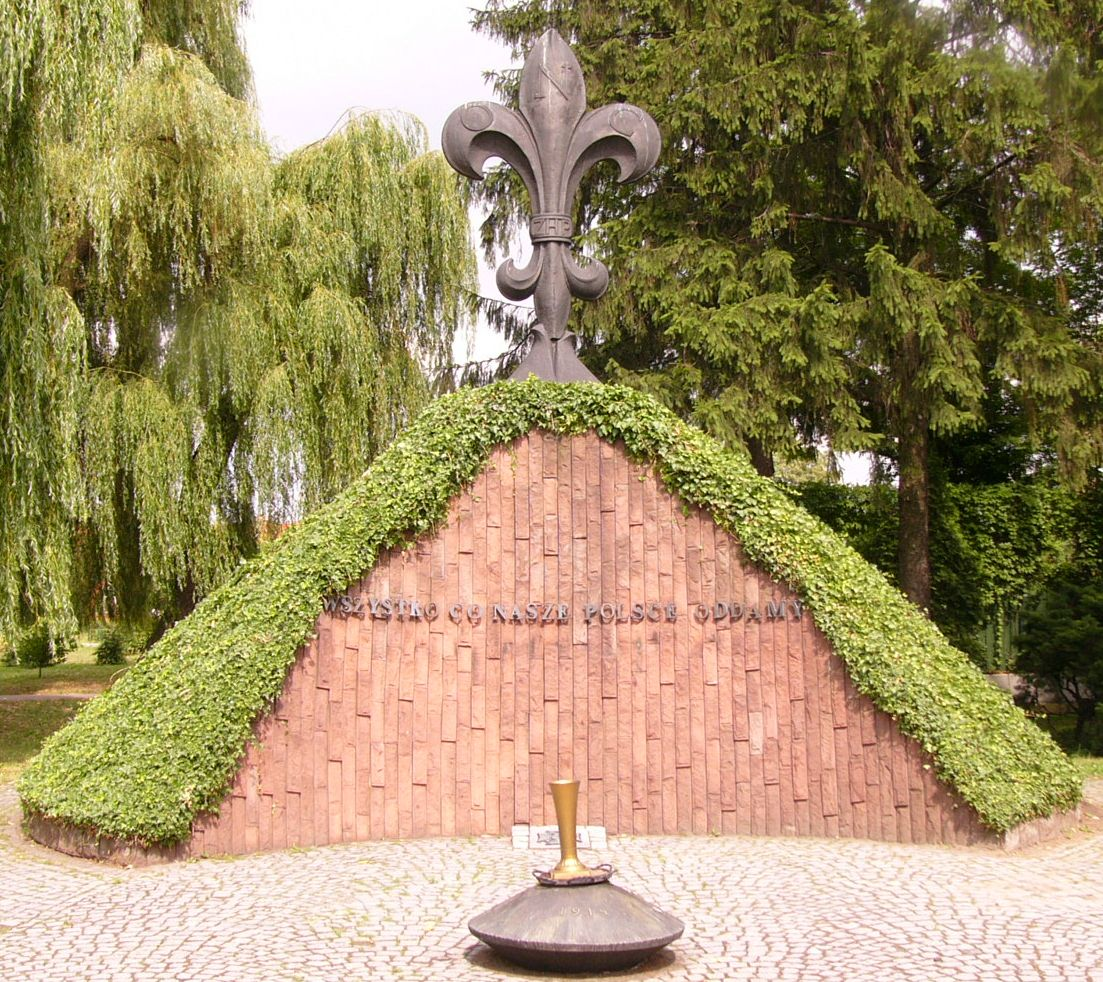
Monument to local Polish scouts fallen in the Greater Poland Uprising and WW2

Sights of Ostrzeszów include:

- Medieval castle tower of King Casimir III the Great
- Gothic church of the Assumption of Mary
- Baroque Holy Family of Nazareth monastery and Saint Michael Archangel church
- Rynek ("Market Square") with colourful townhouses
- Town hall, which houses the Władysław Golus Regional Museum, including exhibitions devoted to Norwegian POWs of Oflag XXI-C, artifacts from the Greater Poland uprising of 1918–1919, and paintings by Antoni Serbeński
- Monument to Polish insurgents of the Greater Poland Uprising (1918–19)
- Monument to local Polish scouts fallen in the Greater Poland Uprising and World War II
- surrounding forests.

== Cuisine ==
The officially protected traditional foods originating from Ostrzeszów (as designated by the Ministry of Agriculture and Rural Development of Poland) are:

- kiełbasa wiejska ostrzeszowska, a local type of kiełbasa, prepared using traditional non-industrial methods, smoked with beech wood.
- Ostrzeszów pork leg (udziec wieprzowy ostrzeszowski), a locally popular roast leg, prepared using traditional non-industrial methods, a staple Easter dish in the town and its surroundings.
- wędzonka ostrzeszowska, a type of Polish smoked pork meat, prepared using traditional non-industrial methods, also a popular traditional Christmas and Easter dish in the town.
- Ostrzeszów oat goose (gęś owsiana ostrzeszowska), a local type of roasted goose, traditional dish of Ostrzeszów and the Greater Poland region.

== Transport ==
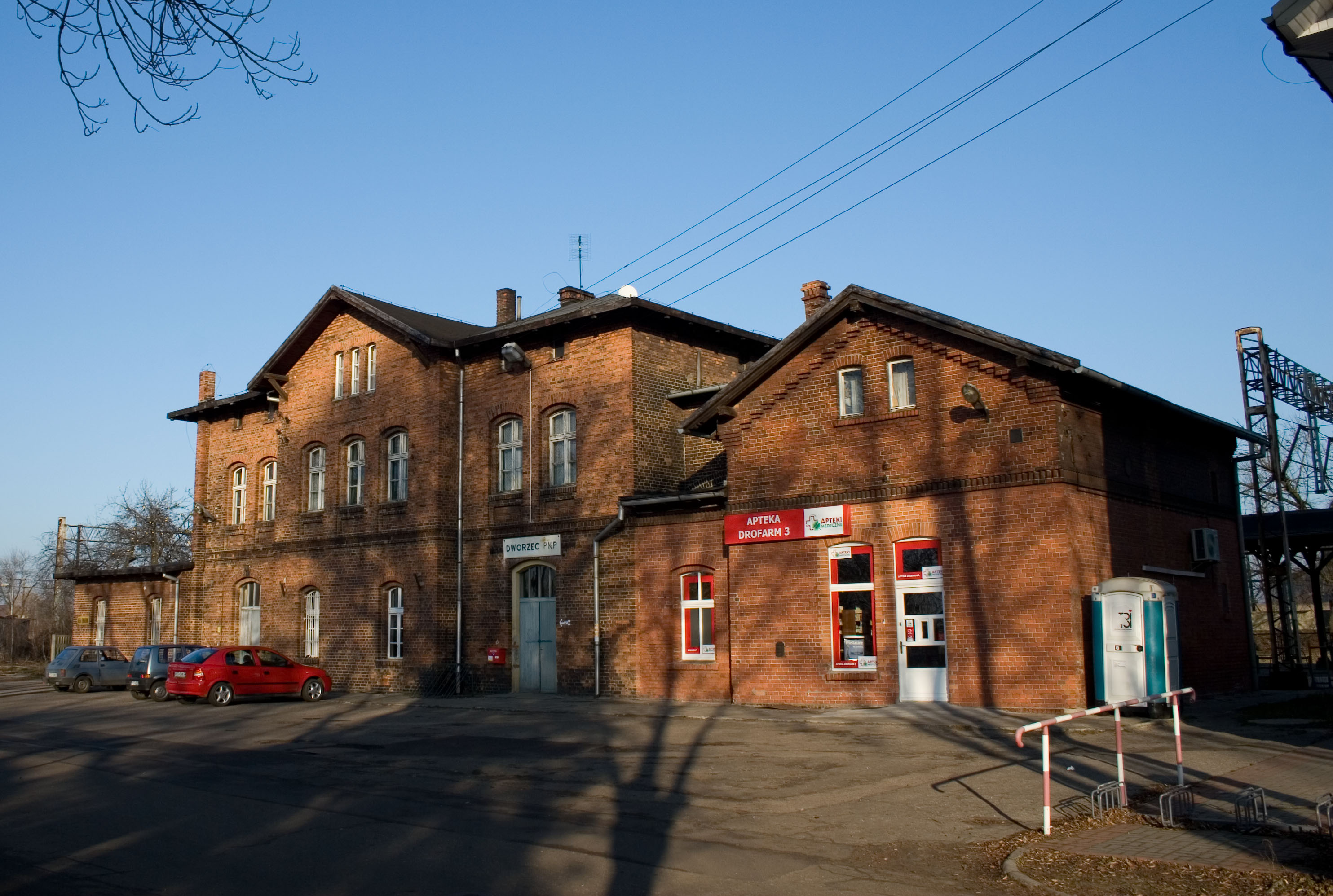
Ostrzeszów railway station

National road 11 runs through Ostrzeszów connecting it to Ostrów Wielkopolski to the north and to Kępno to the south.

Ostrzeszów has a station on the Poznań-Opole railway line.

Vovoideship roads 449 and 444 pass through the town.

== Sports ==
The local table tennis team is UKS Piast Poprawa Ostrzeszów. It competes in the first league.

The local football team is Victoria Ostrzeszów. It competes in the lower leagues.

== Notable people ==
- Adam Fulara (born 1977), guitarist
