= Adam Fulara =

Polish guitarist (born 1977)

- Born: Ostrzeszów; 1977 (age 48–49)
- Origin: Poland
- Genres: Classical rock, Jazz rock
- Occupation: Guitarist
- Instrument: Electric guitar
- Years active: 25
- Website: fulara.com

Adam Fulara (born 1977 in Ostrzeszów, Poland) is a Polish guitarist who specialises in two-handed polyphonic tapping.

Fulara plays both classical and jazz pieces, the latter often with his trio "Fool-X", which has toured much of Poland and Germany. His music has been featured in the periodicals (see also: interview in BBC).

Played in international concerts, inter alia in United States (Great American Music Hall, 2007). Appreciated by professionals - Sammy Hagar: „Adam Fulara is real genius of guitar.”.

Fulara became well known on the internet via various YouTube videos featuring his unique playing style and guitar which went viral in 2007. The videos showcased his tapping abilities and iconic face which goes into a grimace while playing. The reason for his grimace was that the expression enhances his ability to achieve faster and more accurate tapping abilities. His most popular videos are his guitar versions of Bach's Goldberg Variations which were originally for harpsichord. Fulara keeps the complex counterpoint intact due to his double-neck guitar and tapping abilities.

== Discography ==
- "An introduction to Counterpoint" as leader of Full-X (46:37 minutes), ABsonic 2013,
- "Two-handed tapping. Guitar workshop. Tapping oburęczny – szkoła na gitarę" DVD (65 minutes) + book, ABsonic 2009,
- "Doubleshred" as leader of Fool-X trio (41:22 minutes), Fulara Productions 2006.

== Sources ==
- Magdeburger Volksstimme ("Two hand tapping mit Fool-X", August 31, 2006),
- Czas Ostrzeszowski ("Debiutanckie wymiatanie Fool X Trio", November 22, 2006).
