= Stalag XXI-C =

World War II German prisoner-of-war camp

- Wolsztyn, German-occupied Poland

Site information
- Type: Prisoner-of-war camp
- Controlled by: Nazi Germany

Location
- Coordinates: 52.1185°N 16.1204°E

Site history
- In use: 1939–1945
- Battles/wars: World War II

Garrison information
- Occupants: Polish prisoners of war and civilians, French, British, Soviet, American, Norwegian, Dutch and Italian prisoners of war

Stalag XXI-C was a German Army World War II prisoner-of-war camp located in Wolsztyn in German-occupied Poland. It held mostly Polish, French, British and Soviet POWs, but also American, Norwegian, Dutch and Italian.

It was one of four main German POW camps in the Military District XXI, alongside the Stalag XXI-A in Ostrzeszów, Stalag XXI-B in Szubin and Stalag XXI-D in Poznań.

== History ==
The camp was established in September 1939, shortly after the invasion of Poland which started World War II, as a Kriegsgefangenenlager camp for Polish POWs. It was located at the former estate of the Mycielski family in the district of Komorowo. In December 1939, it was converted into a transit camp for expelled Poles from the region.

In 1940 it was converted into the Stalag XXI-C POW camp and expanded, and the Stalag XXI-C/Z subcamp was established in Grodzisk Wielkopolski. French and British POWs were brought to the camp in 1940, and Soviet POWs were brought in 1941.

In June 1941, the Stalag XXI-C/Z subcamp in Grodzisk Wielkopolski was converted into the separate Stalag XXI-E camp for British, Polish and Serbian POWs.

In 1943, Stalag XXI-C still housed Soviet POWs as well as British, French, American, Norwegian and Dutch soldiers treated in the POW hospital. The medical staff of the hospital consisted of Polish POWs and some other POWs. In September 1943, Italians were brought to the camp, and in 1944, Polish soldiers and American airmen, who helped the Polish Warsaw Uprising also arrived.

== Dissolution ==
In January 1945, the healthy POWs were transported west to the Stalag III-A POW camp. Polish medics and some 500 sick soldiers remained. On 26 January 1945, the Soviets captured the town and liberated the camp.

After the war, the former POW camp served as a temporary shelter for Poles displaced from former eastern Poland annexed by the Soviet Union.
