= Oflag XXI-C =

World War II German prisoner-of-war camp

- Ostrzeszów, German-occupied Poland
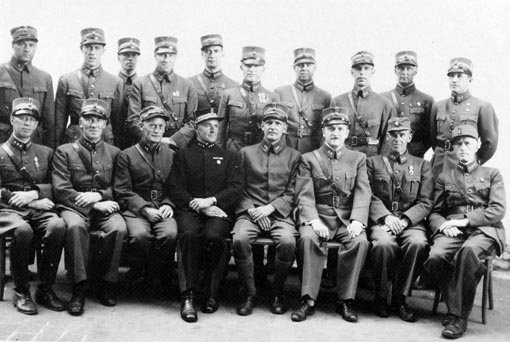
- Norwegian prisoners of war in Oflag XXI-C

Site information
- Type: Prisoner-of-war camp
- Controlled by: Nazi Germany

Location
- Ostrzeszów, Poland
- Coordinates: 51.4262°N 17.9325°E

Site history
- In use: 1942 – 1945
- Battles/wars: World War II

Garrison information
- Occupants: Norwegian, Dutch, Italian, Serbian and Soviet officers

Oflag XXI-C was a German Army World War II prisoner-of-war camp for officers (Offizierlager) located in Ostrzeszów in German-occupied Poland. It held mostly Norwegian officers arrested in 1942 and 1943, but also Dutch, Italian, Serbian and Soviet POWs. Originally most Norwegian soldiers and officers had been released after the end of the Norwegian campaign, but as resistance activities increased, the officers were rearrested and sent to POW camps.

== Camp history ==
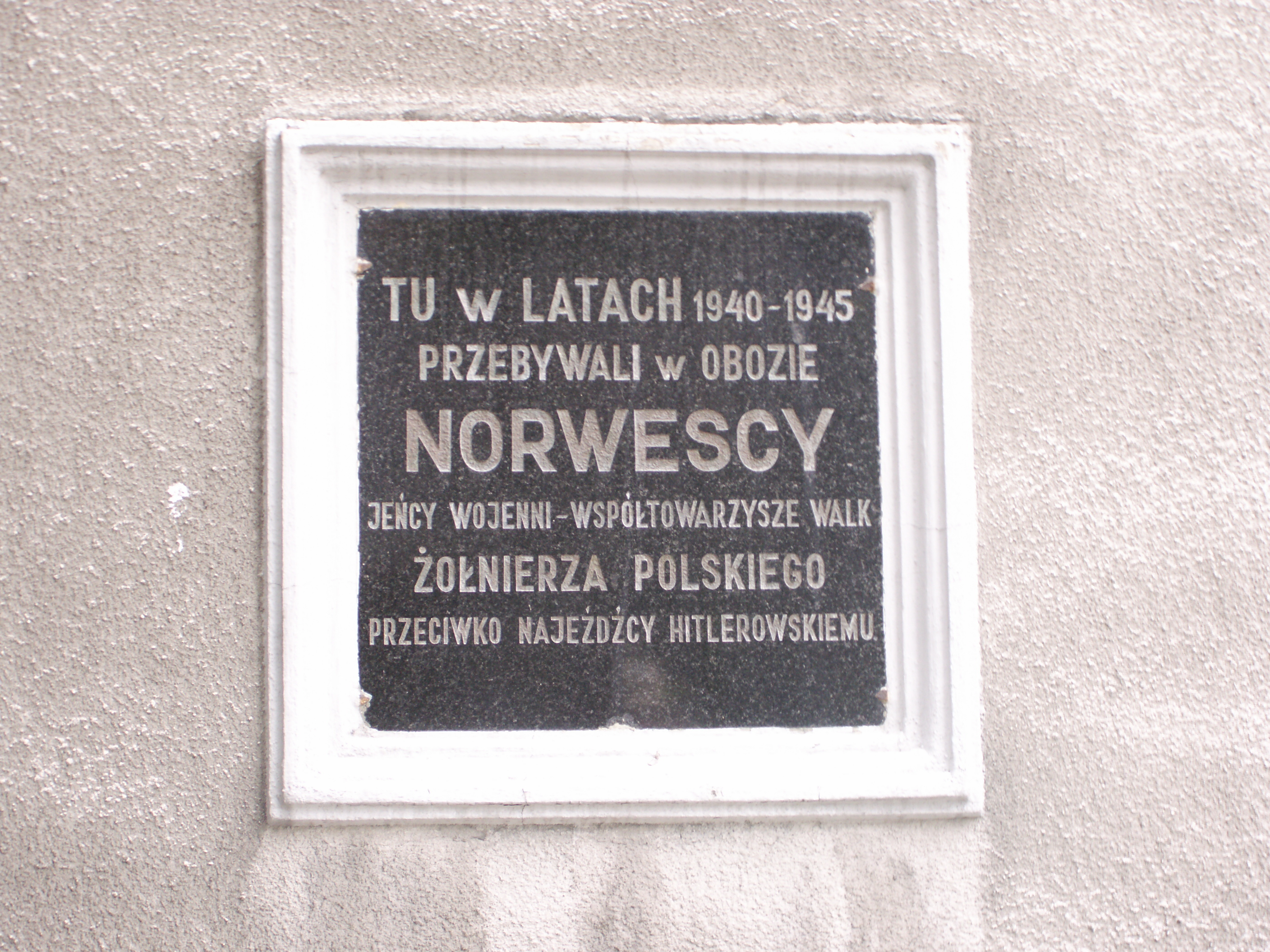
Memorial plaque to Norwegian POWs at the local high school building, which was occupied by Oflag XXI-C

The camp was originally established in June 1942 near Skoki 30 km (19 mi) north of Poznań, in what had previously been Oflag XXI-A, opened in September 1940 as a camp for Polish officers.

In March 1943 it was moved to Ostrzeszów (renamed Schildberg during the German occupation) taking over buildings previously used as a camp for wounded and sick British non-commissioned officers and designated Stalag XXI-A. This camp was unique in that it comprised several buildings in the centre of the small town, from which the remaining Polish inhabitants had been removed. These buildings were not adjacent to each other and were surrounded by barbed-wire fences.

In 1944 the Norwegian officers were located as follows: 630 in the Seminary; 290 in the high-school; 100 in the primary school; 80 in the Richter house; 30 in hospital.

There was also a sub-camp (Zweiglager), designated Oflag XXI-C/Z established at Gronówko near Leszno, between September 1943 and January 1945.

=== Escapes ===
The Dutch organized two successful escapes from the camp, most likely in cooperation with the Polish resistance, as two officers escaped on 17 September 1943 and 15 officers and an orderly on 2 November 1943.

Two Norwegian POWs escaped during the evacuation in January 1945 and first hid in an abandoned prison building in Ostrzeszów, and then were received by a local Polish family.

=== Liberation ===
In January 1945 the officers were marched out westward towards Odolanów, finally arriving at Oflag III-A in Luckenwalde, south of Berlin. On 21 January 1945 the Red Army liberated the abandoned camp. On 5 May 1945 the Norwegians were transported east to a camp near Legnica in Silesia, then travelled for several days by train to Hamburg and Aarhus, Denmark, finally arriving in Oslo on 28 May 1945.

== Commemoration ==
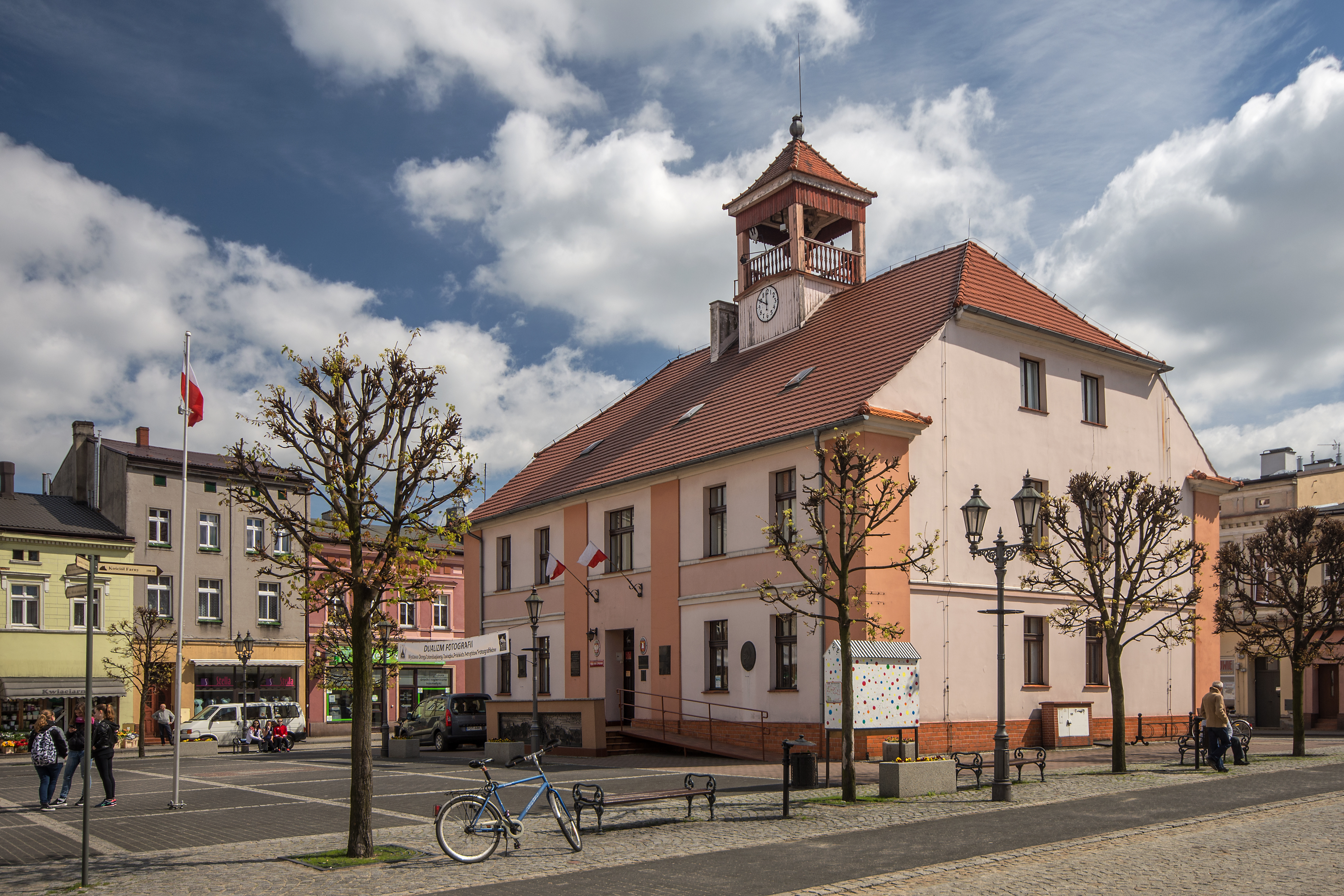
Ostrzeszów Town Hall, which houses the Regional Museum with an exhibition dedicated to Norwegian POWs of Oflag XXI-C

A permanent exhibition devoted to the history of Norwegian POWs of the camp was established in 1996 within the Władysław Golus Regional Museum in Ostrzeszów.

== See also ==
- List of prisoner-of-war camps in Germany
- Occupation of Norway by Nazi Germany

== Bibliography ==
- Graf, Władysław (1992). "Ostrzeszów: obozy jenieckie okresu 1943–1945". Zeszyty Ostrzeszowskie (in Polish). No. 18. Ostrzeszowskie Centrum Kultury.
