= Stein H. Annexstad =

Norwegian businessperson and politician (born 1944)

- Born: 1944 (age 81–82)
- Occupation: businessperson

Stein Holst Annexstad (born 1944) is a Norwegian businessperson and politician for the Conservative Party.

== Business ==
He has worked in Dyno Industrier, Nycomed and Hafslund Nycomed. He is the chairman of the board of Investinor (formerly known as Statens Investeringsselskap), whose task is to invest in fledgling Norwegian companies, through a 49% ownership. This public investment fund has an initial capital of about $300 million. In addition, Annexstad has been a member of the board of SINTEF, Biotec Pharmacon, Algeta, Cermaq, SensoNor, Fokus Bank and the Norwegian School of Management.

In 2005 controversy surrounded Annexstad, as he, Trond Wennberg and Jan Gunnar Hartvig were paid a total of $8 million in fees from the investment fund Norgesinvestor 2, despite the fund having low proceeds in general. Smaller investors had earned far lower proceeds. According to the newspaper Dagens Næringsliv, the three had earned $18.5 million from 1996 to 2004, from an initial capital of $250,000.

Annexstad has a fortune of $7.0 million.

== Politics ==
Annexstad is a member of Asker municipal council, representing the Conservative Party. He was elected in 2007; when he was nominated for the ticket the local newspaper described this as a "surprise".

As of 2007 he was the wealthiest politician in the municipalities Asker and Bærum, ahead of businessman and fellow Conservative representative Leif Frode Onarheim.
