= Germanisation in Poland (1939–1945) =

German led genocide of Jews in Poland (1939-1945)

An intense campaign of Germanisation was carried out by Nazi Germany in German-occupied Poland during World War II, as part of a broader program of racial domination and territorial expansion that sought to dismantle Polish society and replace it with a German settler population. This included the systematic murder of Polish intellectuals and the abduction and forced Germanisation of Polish children.

== Ideological background ==
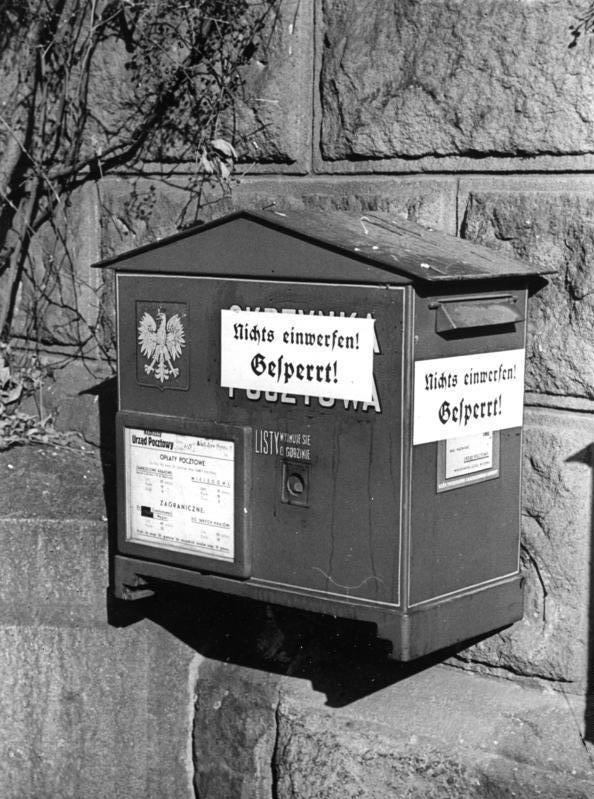
Post box during German occupation in Poznań

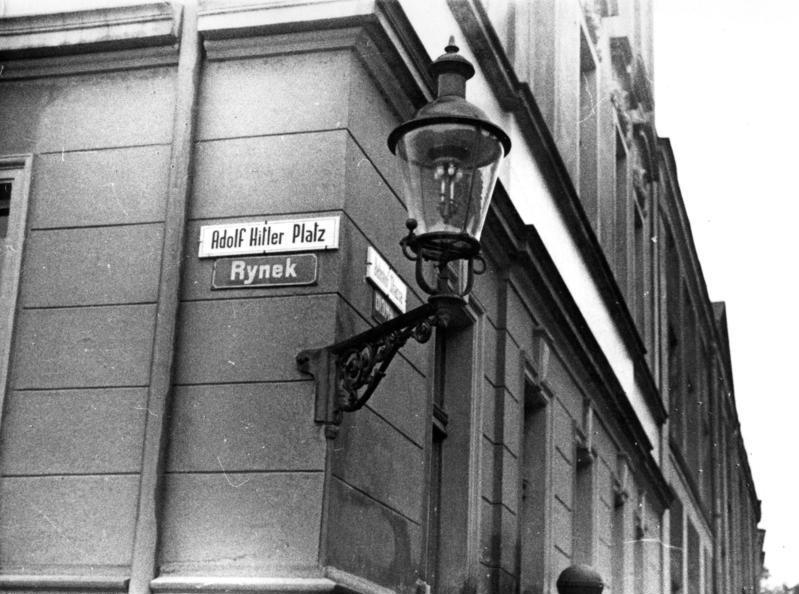
Old Market Square (Stary Rynek) in Poznań renamed Adolf Hitler Platz

"Adolf Hitler in Mein Kampf proclaimed, language-exclusive Germanisation does not equate to total Germanisation, an alien nation, which expresses its thought in non-German form, degrades the greatness and honour of the German nation. The implementation of Germanisation requires a change of character of the occupied nation via partial expulsion of the Polish populous and the assimilation of the rest, deemed upon their "racially worthy" elements."

The greatest fervour of Germanisation was implemented in those regions seized by the German Wehrmacht during World War II. Frequently in his public rallies, Adolf Hitler called for the displacement and liquidation of Poles inhabiting Poland. On November 25, 1939, at the NSDAP Office of Racial Policy, a codification was formed codifying Erhard Wetzel and Günther Hecht's memorandum entitled "The Question of the treatment of the population of the former Polish territories in accordance to racial politics" ("Die Frage der Behandlung der Bevölkerung der ehemaligen polnischen Gebiete nach rassepolitischen Gesichtspunkten"), which openly expressed:

"Those Poles suitable for Germanisation shall receive German surnames after having undergone the complete process of Germanisation, that will take two to three generations. The administrative, trade and common language shall be German, whilst administrators on former Polish soil may only be German. [...] Our pursuance is to Germanise as rapidly the Germanisable populous. [...] The decisively Polish elements must be expelled. [...] Poles may not take part in secondary, vocational schools, nor higher education. [...] Church service must not be undertaken in Polish. Any type of association, corporation and religious or church gatherings are forbiden, whilst Polish restaurants, cafés and cinemas shall be closed down, in addition, all Polish press and book publications must be abolished. [...] Those people who are incapable of being renationalised, must be subject to culture of the shallowest nature. [...] In that populous categorised for expulsion, racially-worthy children no greater than 8-10 years of age, should be selected and relocated to the Reich. [...] No contact is permitted with their Polish kin. [...] Otherwise, expel: all Poles, that settled on the terrain of the New Reich after October 1, 1918, all Polish intelligentsia, Polish activists, those so-called neutral Poles that fail to Germanise, all Jews [...] and all Polish-Jewish inhabitants. [...] There will be no Polish journalists, nor will there be any Polish book and newspaper publications."

== "Divide and rule" ==
Germany used the ancient divide and rule strategy in Occupied Poland. In accordance to the aforesaid strategy, Germanisation was sanctioned on the Polish population on a regional basis. The best known operation was named goralenvolk. Heinrich Himmler, in his strictly secret memorandum, entitled Gedanken über die Behandlung Fremdvölkischer im Osten ("Thoughts on Treatment of Alien Races in the East"), dated May 25, 1940, described the German tactic against Poland: "We have to divide Poland into as many ethnic groups, regions and divided groups as it is possible". Likewise, in his reflections, entitled: "A few thoughts on the treatment of aliens in the East" (Einige Gedanken über die Behandlung der Fremdenvölker im Osten), Himmler writes: "We have to aim to recognise and retain as many different nationalities, that is besides the Poles and Jews, also Ukrainians, Belarusians, Gorals, Lemkos and Kashubians. If one kind find other breakaway nationalities – those also. [...] What I am trying to state is, it is not in our interest to unite national groups and foment and gradually increase national identity and the development of national culture, on the contrary, to divide it into many parts and fractures. [...] Within [...] 4 to 5 years e.g. the term Kashubians must be unknown, for the Kashubian nation will be no more (this especially refers to Western Prussia). In the long term, we must also liquidate the Ukrainian, Goral and Lemko identity on our territory. What was said about those national offshoots similarly largely refers to the Poles."

== Germanisation of placenames ==
On August 1, 1940, in Kraków, Hans Frank and Josef Bühler headed a conference concerning the Germanisation of Polish place names in the General Governate, it was decided that every central square would be renamed to "Adolf Hitler Platz" and those roads heading to which shall be called Reichsstrasse, Strasse der Wehrmacht as well as Strasse der Bewegung.

Nearly all settlement names in areas annexed by Nazi Germany and the General Governate were Germanised. For example, Łódź was renamed Litzmannstadt, in 1941, Rzeszów was changed into Reichshof whilst Zamość, whom the Germans believed to be a German settlement, was to be renamed Himmlerstadt, as to honour Heinrich Himmler. Street names were also Germanised, firstly by adding a second German name, and later removing the Polish counterpart. During the German occupation of Poland, all Germanised street names were written in the Gothic script. Nearly every main street was renamed "Hitlerstraße" in honour of Adolf Hitler. In Łódź, on September 7, 1939, the chief of the police ordered to remove all signboards that bore a Polish word, as well as the removal of products that carried a Polish-branded label.

== Destruction of Polish culture and science ==
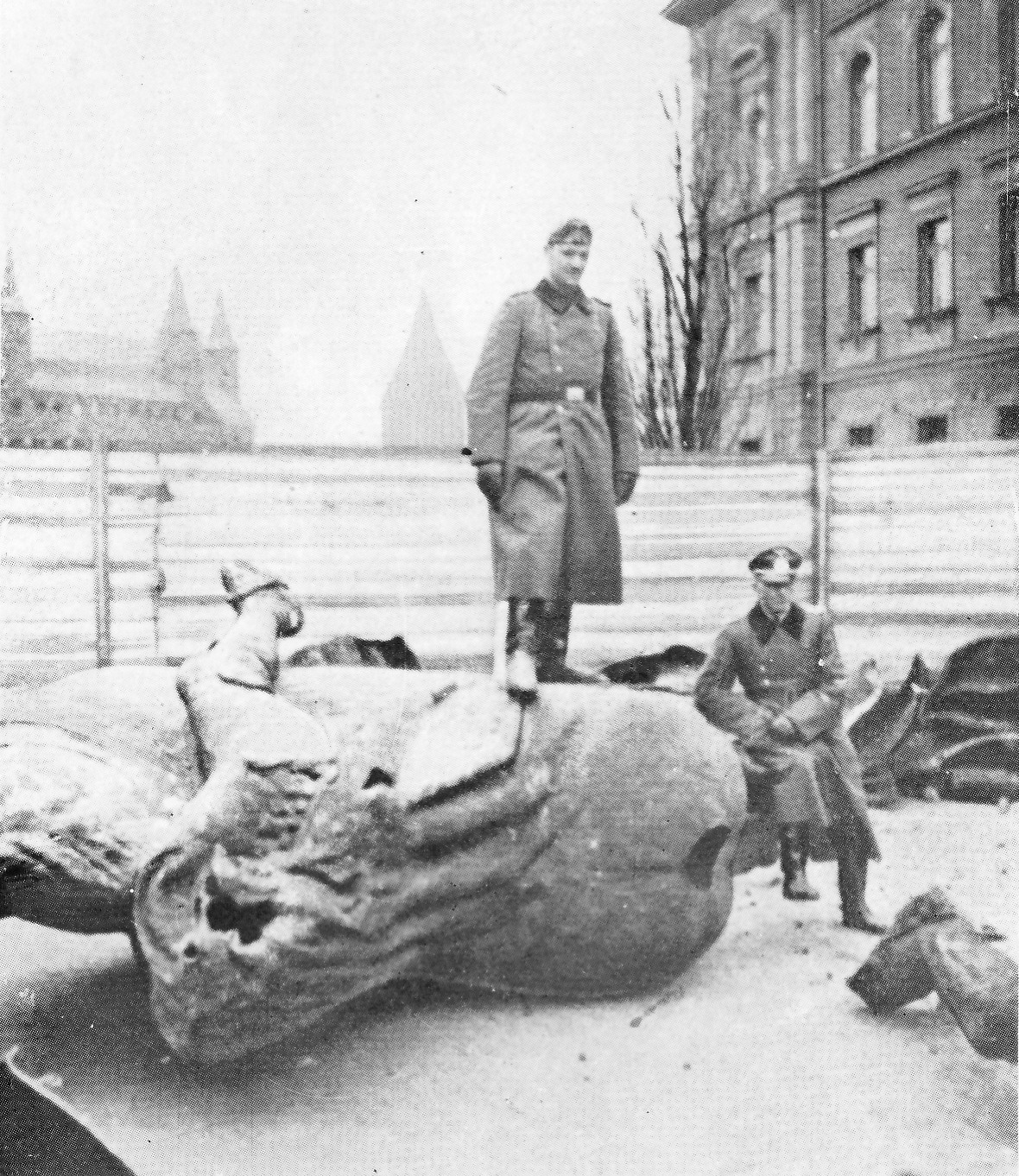
Destruction of the Grunwald Monument in Kraków, November 1939

On October 31, 1939 Joseph Goebbels stated: "The Poles fundamentally should not have theatres, cinemas [...]. All schools and seminaries must be closed down in the General Governate [...]. Poles should be left with such educational institutions that will punish the hopelessness of their national status." Hans Frank commanded that all educational institutions above elementary must be liquidated. The teaching of history was forbidden.

The occupying authorities of the German General Governate brought into being operations that would inhibit the cultural development of the forcefully subordinated Polish population in the long-run. The main guidelines were formed by Dr. E. Weltz and Dr. G. Hecht's national politics programme from November 25, 1939, based on Adolf Hitler's statements made at the November 23, 1939, conference of the Ministry of Interior Affairs. The document concluded, inter alia:

"Universities and other higher education institutions, vocational schools, as well as secondary schools were always centres of Polish chauvinistic upbringing and therefore must be closed down. Only primary schools may be permitted, teaching only the most primitive of subjects: arithmetic, reading and writing. Education in fields of greater nationalist reals, like geography, history, history of literature and gymnastics, must be prohibited."

The Minister of Education, K. Szelągowski along with other higher administrators were sent to a concentration camp in Sachsenhausen. Thereupon, higher education institutions and secondary schools were liquidated. The General Superintendent Frank, on June 18, 1940, decided to resume the operation of primary and vocational schools with a limited educational level, limited to that of German technical schools. More drastic decisions in the sphere of education were proposed by Heinrich Himmler, who in a document from May 15, 1940, proposed to reduce the level of education in the General Governate to four-year primary schools, students would be taught numbers up to 500, writing of the surname and the enforcement of a tract that God's command against the Poles is total servitude, honesty, urgency and kindness towards the Germans.

== Biological extermination ==
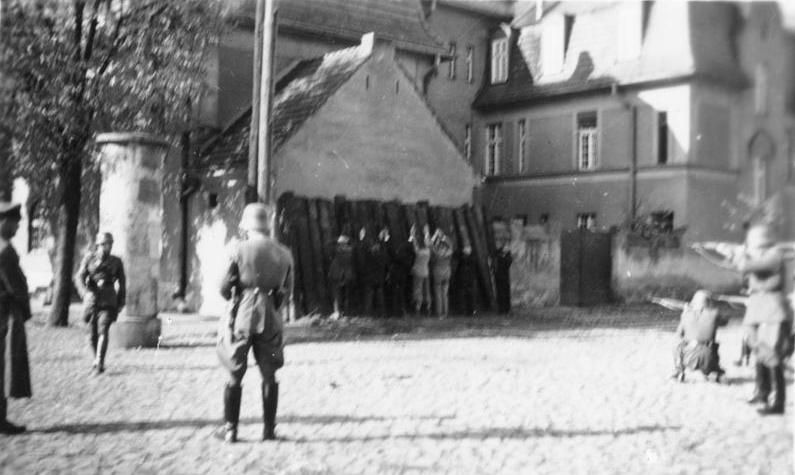
Execution of Poles by the Einsatzgruppen on October 20, 1939, in Kórnik

"Only a nation, whose underlying inclinations are destroyed, will allow itself to be thrown into slavery."

The Germanisation of the Polish populace included limitedly planned and systemised elimination of the Poles. During the German invasion of Poland, divisions of the Einsatzgruppen were placed within the Wehrmacht, in accordance to the Special Prosecution Book for Poland composed via interviews with the German minority in the Second Polish Republic, carried out the murder of the Polish intelligentsia during the Intelligenzaktion. After the defeat of the Polish military, the extermination of the Polish intellectual elite was realised via operations like Operation Tannenberg, AB-Aktion, that would deprive Poland its political, scientific, social, cultural and militaristic elite.

The Intelligenzaktion led to the deaths of 100,000 Poles, of which around 50,000 were murdered by so-called "direct action" (i.e. shooting); the other 50,000 were sent to concentration camps, and few of them survived. Territory that had been directly incorporated into Nazi Germany suffered the most severe losses, with 40,000 murdered and 20,000 sent to concentration camps.

== Expulsions ==
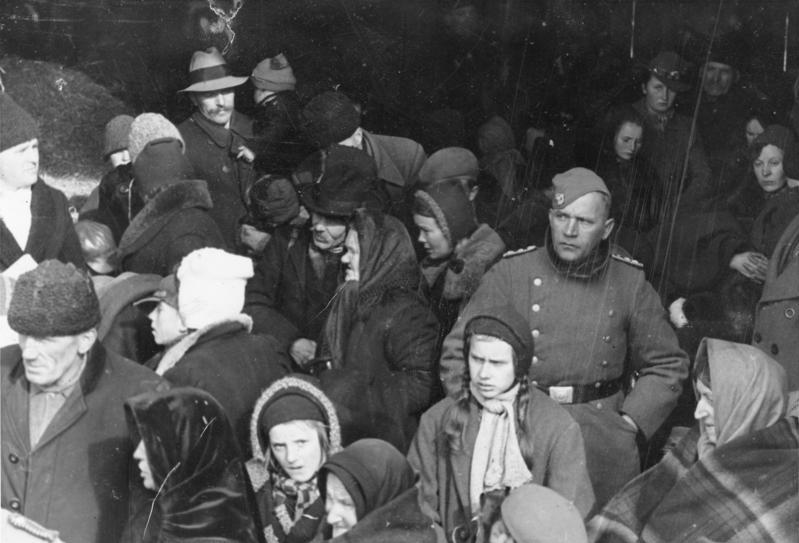
Expulsion of Poles from Warta Land in an interim camp, 1939

An extensive forced population transfer was conducted by Germany during World War II. The expulsions were part of a long-term plan, Generalplan Ost, that would turn the Polish nation into a primitive, cultureless kind, that would be denationalisable and be controlled with ease. Hans Frank, the General Superintendent of the General Governate, at a hearing on March 11, 1942, asserted: "...our aim [...] should be the complete clearance of the Vistulan Land [Weichselland] including Galicia. This will only be feasible with time, when the inhabiting nations are expelled – the Poles and Ukrainians. It is no doubt, that such changes will take decades, yet this is the only right path, all else is defective."

== Kidnapping of children ==
Part of the Generalplan Ost (GPO) involved in taking children regarded as "Aryan-looking" from the rest of Europe and moving them to Nazi Germany for the purpose of Germanisation, or indoctrination into becoming culturally German. At more than 200,000 victims, occupied Poland had the largest proportion of children taken.
