= Gronówko, Greater Poland Voivodeship =

Gronówko
- Village
- Location within Poland
- Coordinates: 51°53′N 16°36′E
- Country: Poland
- Voivodeship: Greater Poland
- County: Leszno
- Gmina: Lipno
- Time zone: UTC+1 (CET)
  - Summer (DST): UTC+2 (CEST)
- Vehicle registration: PLE

Gronówko [ɡrɔˈnufkɔ] is a village in the administrative district of Gmina Lipno, within Leszno County, Greater Poland Voivodeship, in west-central Poland.

== History ==
Gronówko was a private village of Polish nobility, administratively located in the Kościan County in the Poznań Voivodeship in the Greater Poland Province of the Kingdom of Poland.

During the German occupation of Poland (World War II), in November 1943, the occupiers established a subcamp of the Oflag XXI-C prisoner-of-war camp in the village. It held British and Dutch officers, with Italian POWs serving as orderlies.
