= Stalag XXI-A =

World War II German prisoner-of-war camp

- Ostrzeszów, German-occupied Poland
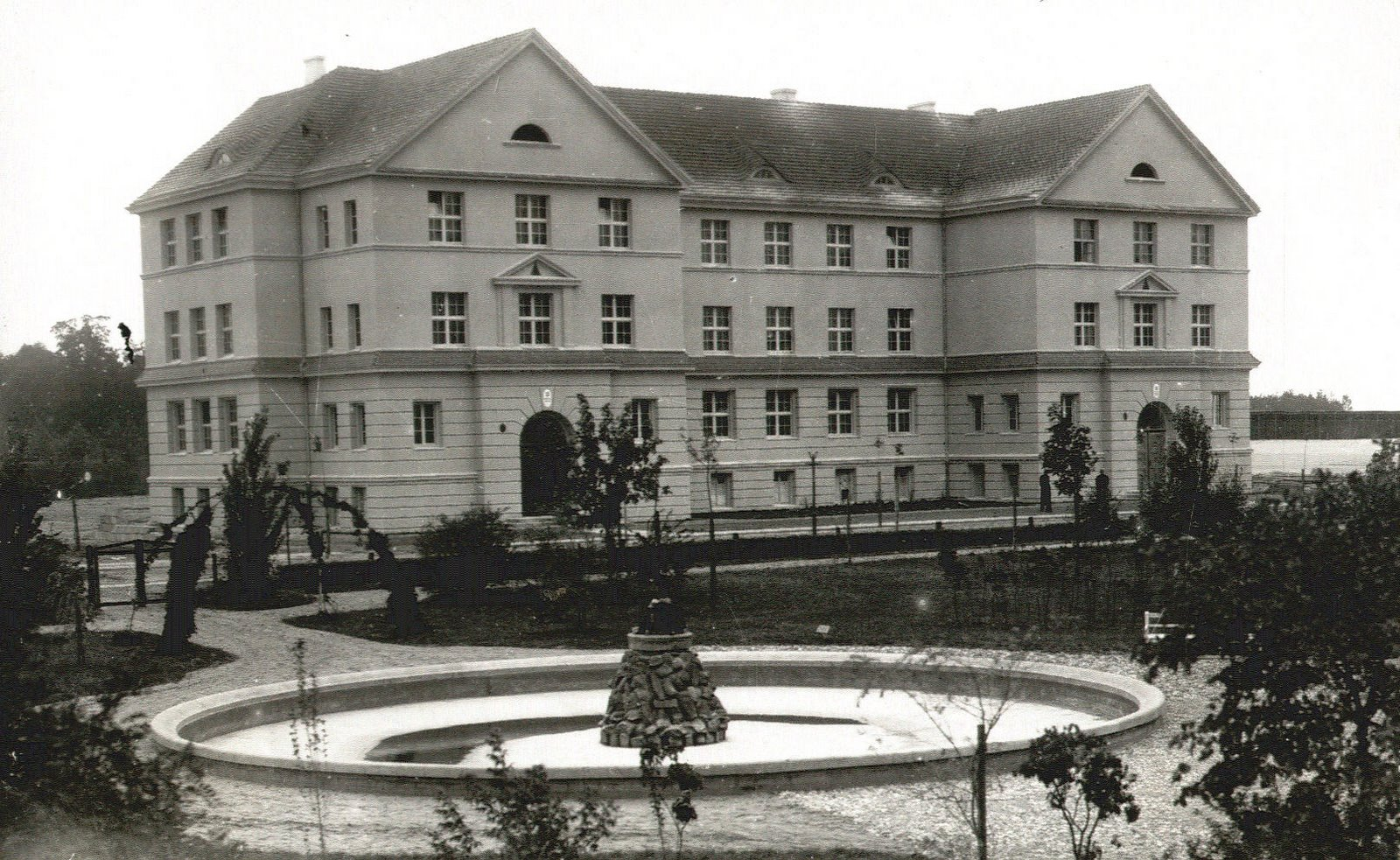
- Pre-war view of a school in Ostrzeszów, one of the buildings occupied by the Dulag transit camp for Polish POWs and civilians

Site information
- Type: Prisoner-of-war camp
- Controlled by: Nazi Germany

Location
- Coordinates: 51.4262°N 17.9325°E

Site history
- In use: 1940–1943
- Battles/wars: World War II

Garrison information
- Occupants: Polish, French, Moroccan, Algerian, French Sudanese, British, Dutch, Belgian, Yugoslav prisoners of war

Stalag XXI-A was a German Army World War II prisoner-of-war camp located in Ostrzeszów in German-occupied Poland. It held mostly Polish, French and British POWs, but also Dutch, Belgian and Yugoslav.

It was one of four main German POW camps in the Military District XXI, alongside the Stalag XXI-B in Szubin, Stalag XXI-C in Wolsztyn and Stalag XXI-D in Poznań.

== Dulag ==
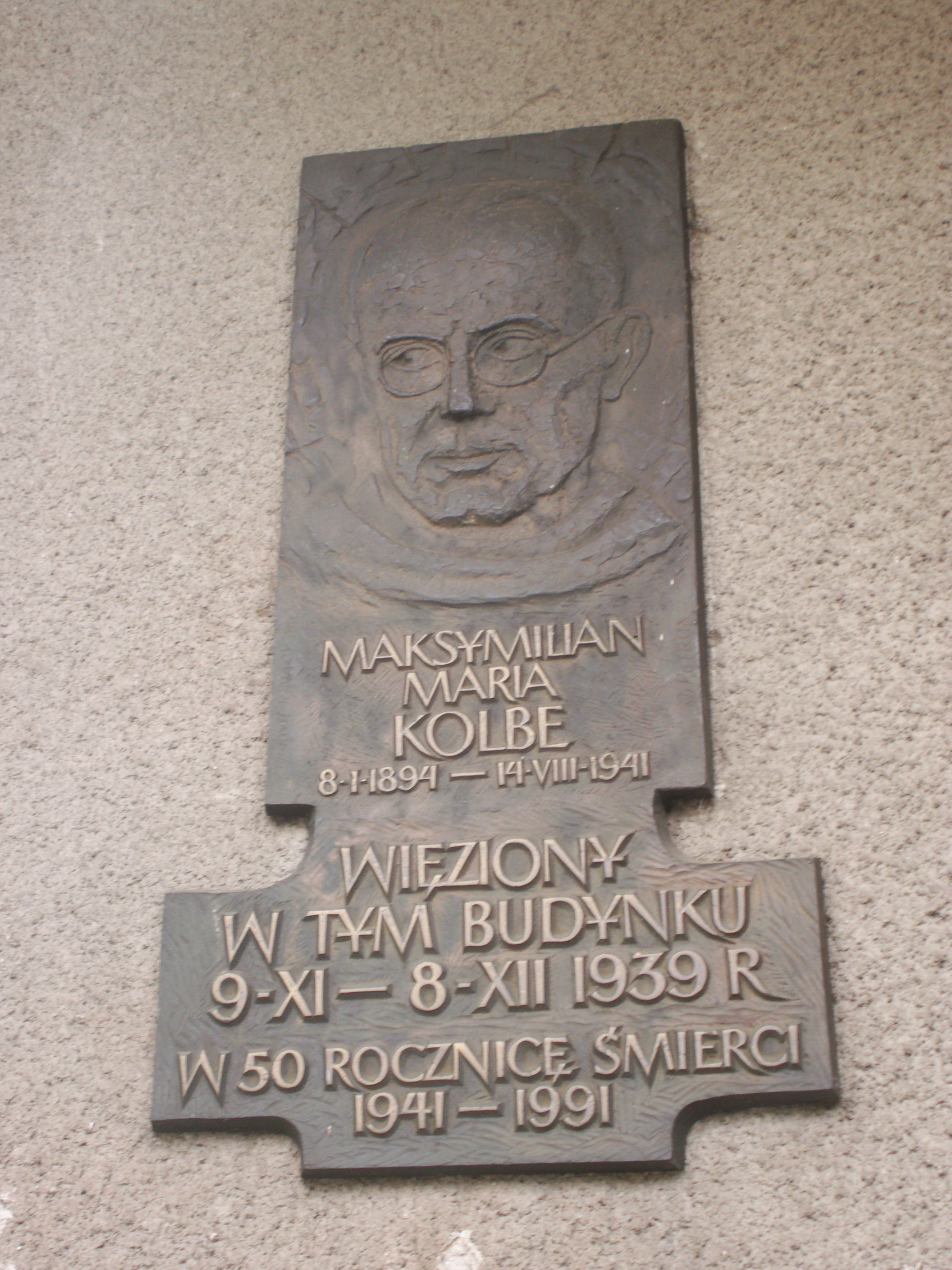
Memorial plaque to Maximilian Kolbe

The camp was established in September 1939, shortly after the invasion of Poland which started World War II, as a Dulag transit camp for Poles. It was located in over 30 buildings and places throughout the town. Some 22,000 Polish POWs and 12,000 Polish civilians passed through the camp. Also Franciscans from Niepokalanów were held there, including Maximilian Kolbe, who was later killed in the Auschwitz concentration camp and is now considered a saint of the Catholic Church. Conditions in the overcrowded camp were poor, food was scarce, sanitary conditions were bad and medical aid was practically nonexistent. There were cases of abuse of wounded or sick POWs by German doctors, and one even recommended "treating dysentery patients with starvation." To aid the prisoners, the Poles of Ostrzeszów smuggled food, clothing, shoes, blankets and books for the camp's inmates, as well as assisted in escapes from the camp. In retaliation, the Germans carried out the first expulsions of Poles from Ostrzeszów already in September and December 1939, and murdered a number of Polish hostages from the town during the large massacres of Poles in Winiary.

Many Polish POWs were deprived of their POW status and sent to forced labour in a blatant breach of the Geneva Conventions. Polish POWs of Jewish origin were deported to camps for Jews.

== Stalag ==
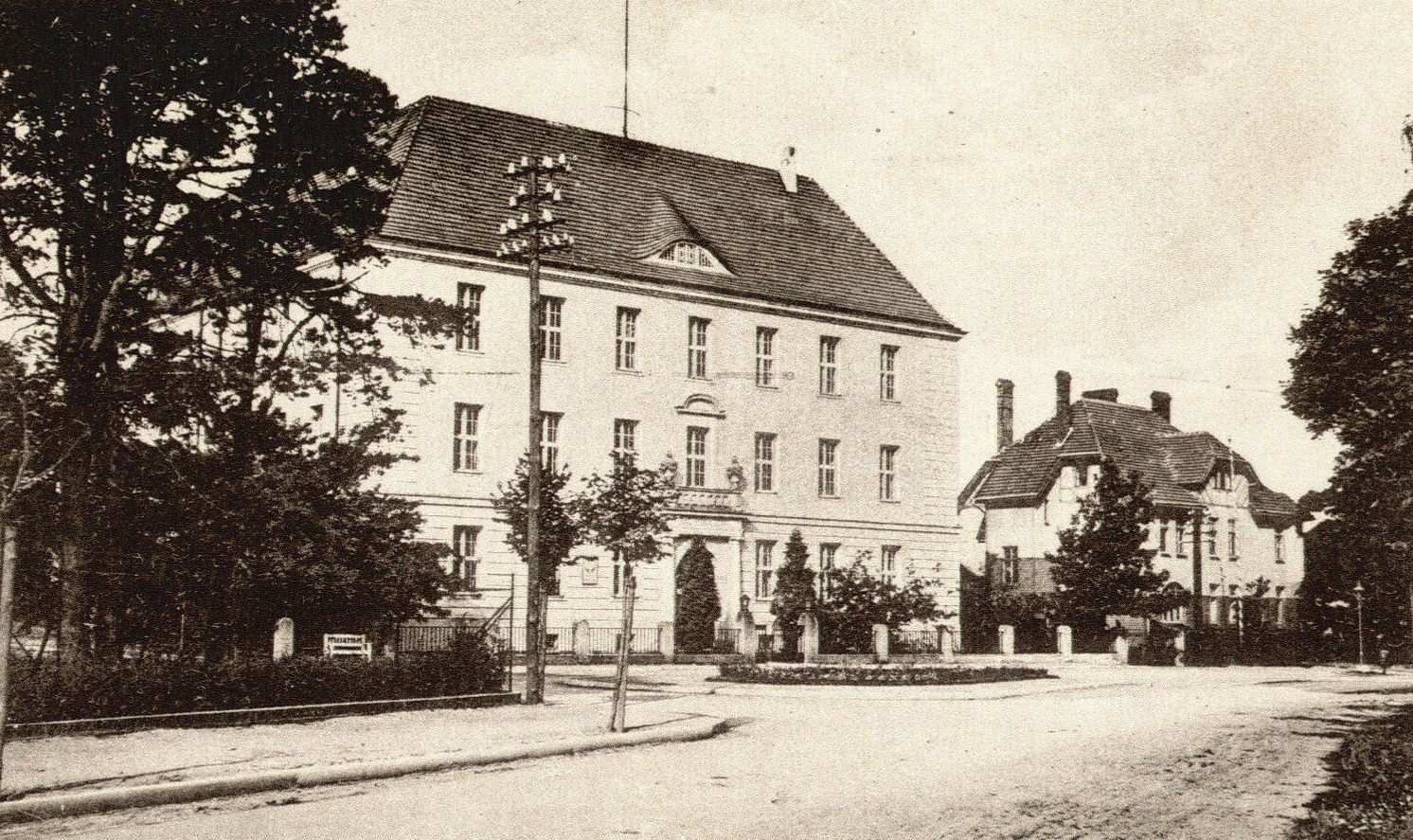
Pre-war view of the former courthouse and tax office, which under German occupation housed the camp guards' quarters and the POW infectious disease hospital, respectively

In January 1940 the camp was converted into the Stalag XXI-A POW camp for Allied POWs of various nationalities. Initially only Poles were housed in the camp, but from May 1940, also French, Moroccan, Algerian and French Sudanese POWs were imprisoned there. In August 1940, British Expeditionary Force POWs from the Battle of Dunkirk were brought to the camp. Also some Dutch, Belgian and Polish POWs were brought there. In December 1940, most Polish POWs were deported to other camps, and from 1941 to 1943 Britons formed the majority of the detained POWs. Some Yugoslavs were imprisoned in the camp in 1942. Local Poles continued their assistance to Polish and other Allied POWs, by smuggling medical and sanitary supplies, and even invisible ink so that POWs could report the true conditions of the camp in letters to their families.

== Resistance and escapes ==
A local unit of the Home Army resistance organization facilitated the escape of five Polish POWs from the camp in March 1940, and also smuggled Polish underground press to the camp, and smuggled a radio for the British POWs.

== Dissolution ==
In 1943, surviving POWs were moved to other locations, and the camp was dissolved to make space for the Oflag XXI-C camp moved from Skoki. Its prisoners were mostly Norwegian officers.

== Bibliography ==
- Graf, Władysław (1992a). "Ostrzeszów: obozy jenieckie okresu 1939–1940. Część 1". Zeszyty Ostrzeszowskie (in Polish). No. 15. Ostrzeszowskie Centrum Kultury.
- Graf, Władysław (1992b). "Ostrzeszów: obozy jenieckie okresu 1939–1940. Część 2". Zeszyty Ostrzeszowskie (in Polish). No. 16. Ostrzeszowskie Centrum Kultury.
- Graf, Władysław (1992c). "Ostrzeszów: obozy jenieckie okresu 1940–1942". Zeszyty Ostrzeszowskie (in Polish). No. 17. Ostrzeszowskie Centrum Kultury.
- Megargee, Geoffrey P.; Overmans, Rüdiger; Vogt, Wolfgang (2022). The United States Holocaust Memorial Museum Encyclopedia of Camps and Ghettos 1933–1945. Volume IV. Indiana University Press, United States Holocaust Memorial Museum. ISBN 978-0-253-06089-1.
- Rusak, Stanisław (2011). "Obozy Wehrmachtu w okupowanym Ostrzeszowie i polsko-norweska pamięć o nich". Łambinowicki rocznik muzealny (in Polish). 34. Opole. ISSN 0137-5199.
