= Idun Fabrikker =

Norwegian food and yeast company

- Formerly: De norske Gjær- & Spritfabrikker A/S
- Company type: Aksjeselskap
- Industry: Food, yeast
- Founded: 1918
- Fate: Acquired by Orkla in 1991; continues as a brand
- Headquarters: Oslo, Norway
- Key people: Edward H. Gerner
- Products: Yeast, vinegar, mustard, mayonnaise, ketchup, dressings, snacks
- Owner: Orkla

Idun Fabrikker was a combination of Norwegian producers of yeast and other foodstuffs that was taken over by Orkla in 1991. Today it is a broad brand for foodstuffs from Orkla, partly produced in Norway by the subsidiary Idun Industri A/S.

== History ==
Idun's origins lie in Kristiania Presgjærfabrik at Sandaker by the Akerselva, from 1883, and Henrik Gerners Gjær- og Spritfabrikk in Moss, from 1892. Both establishments came at the same time as the modernization of milling, in Oslo with Bjølsen Valsemølle on the neighboring site, the industrialization of mills, yeast production, and bread baking being closely linked. The same year, another actor in Moss started Moss Aktie Gjærfabrik and invited bakers, including in Oslo, as co-owners, but quality problems meant the cooperating bakers still had to choose competitors' yeast. The idea of the bakers' own yeast factory was nonetheless pursued under the Oslo bakers Hansen and Samson, and in 1899 they took over the Aktiegjærfabrikken, invested in improvements, and started Bagernes Gjær- og Spritfabrik, which did well.

=== Merger: De norske Gjær- & Spritfabrikker ===
Following poor times for the yeast trade during the First World War, Edward H. Gerner, then both head of the largest yeast factory and head of the yeast manufacturers' association, took the initiative for a merger of the country's yeast factories, in practice a trust that would gain a monopoly. De norske Gjær- & Spritfabrikker A/S was established in September 1918, with head office in Oslo and Gerner as managing director, and eight yeast factories around the country were combined, including Porsgrund Gjærfabrik, the country's first, started in 1882.

In the new group, the Oslo factory was to be built up as the main factory, with laboratories and administration, while five branch factories were kept from the start, in Moss, Drammen, Porsgrunn (closed in 1920), Bergen, and Trondheim. The bakers were still co-owners, and the board had representation from the bakers Hansen and Samson of Oslo and Martens of Bergen, among others.

=== Competition ===
The monopoly was broken in 1923 by a new group of industrialists in Moss, backed by bakers in Vestfold and Østfold who stood outside the yeast trust. A "yeast war" followed, primarily over price and quality but also over the name of the new company, Bagernes Nye Gjær- og Spritfabrik, which had to be changed to De Forenede Bakeres Gjærfabrik AS. The new factory got going in Gudes Gate in Moss in 1923 and did very well as a challenger.

=== Byproducts become a new industry ===
In 1930 the Oslo factory began producing vinegar and mustard in the subsidiary Norex to use byproducts from spirit production, and in time bouillons and a range of food and consumer goods followed under the Norex brand. In 1932 the challenger in Moss started the subsidiary Det Norske Eddikbryggeri, which took the name Idun after the trademark it used on its vinegar and mustard. Production was eventually expanded to include mayonnaise, ketchup, and dressings, and snacks such as potato chips were launched by Idun under the Taffel Chips brand in the 1960s.

=== A new merger ===
In 1960 De norske Gjær- & Spritfabrikker AS in Oslo merged with its competitor De Forenede Bakeres Gjærfabrik AS. Idun Norex became a new subsidiary under the two merged yeast factories, with factories in Oslo, Moss, and Trondheim; yeast and bakery products were made in Oslo and Trondheim, while groceries such as mustard, dressings, ketchup, and snacks were made in Moss. In 1979 the parent company De norske Gjær- og Spritfabrikker AS and the subsidiary Idun-Norex AS merged into Idun Fabrikker AS, and the factory in Moss was moved to new premises in Rygge in 1982.

=== Part of Orkla ===
Through several mergers, the yeast factory was incorporated into Orkla in 1991. The subsidiary Idun Industri A/S was carried on for the production of yeast and baking ingredients, with production at several places in Norway. When yeast lost its tariff protection from 2005, Idun Industri A/S decided to wind down Norwegian yeast production, and with it the whole production plant in Oslo. Orkla's Swedish subsidiary Jästbolaget near Stockholm, which had been bought in 2000, took over the production of yeast for the Norwegian market, still under the Idun yeast brand. The factory at Sandaker was demolished and the area developed into housing, though the gate with the old company logo in wrought iron still stands at the entrance from Treschows gate.
