= Wolin County =

Former county of Poland

- County of the District of the Western Pomerania and Szczecin Voivodeship
- 1945–1973
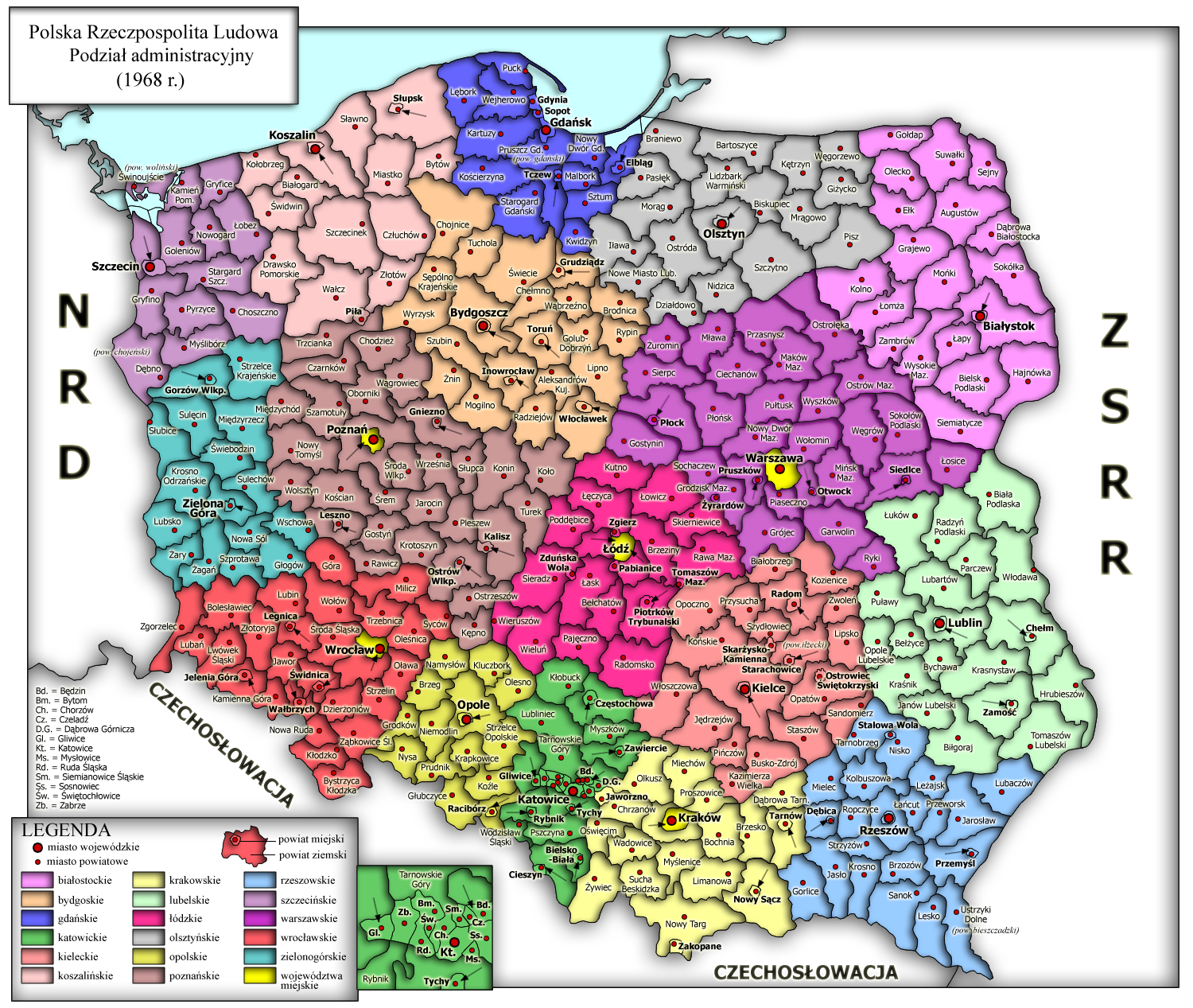
- Counties of Poland in 1968, including the Wolin County.
- Capital: Świnoujście
- History
  - Established: 4 October 1945
  - Incorporation into Kamień County: 1 January 1973
- Contained within
  - Country: Republic of Poland (1945–1947); Polish People's Republic (1947–1972)
  - District: Western Pomerania (1945–1946)
  - Voivodeship: Szczecin (1946–1975)
| Preceded by | Succeeded by |
| Usedom and Wollin District | Kamień County; Świnoujście |
- Today part of: Poland

Wolin County (Note: Polish: Powiat woliński, until 1946 also known as obwód woliński) was a county of Szczecin Voivodeship, in the Polish People's Republic. It comprised Wolin, the eastern part of Usedom, and other smaller surrounding islands. Its capital was Świnoujście. It existed from 1945 to 1973.

== History ==
The county was established on 4 October 1945, from the western part of Usedom and Wollin District, that was part of the territory ceased to Poland, after the fall of Nazi Germany. It comprised Wolin, the eastern part of Usedom, and other smaller surrounding islands. Its capital was Świnoujście, and two other major towns were Wolin and Międzyzdroje. It was located within the Republic of Poland until 19 February 1947, when the Polish People's Republic replaced it. It was part of the District of the Western Pomerania, until 28 June 1946, when, the district was replaced by the Szczecin Voivodeship.

As the German population was subjected to the expulsion from Poland, the area was resettled with Poles. On 6 October 1945, the delegation of State Repatriation Office consisting of four people, had arrived in Świnoujście, where it established the regional branch of the office. At the same time, two institutions were established in Świnoujście and Wolin, with the purpose to prepare for the settling population. At the beginning of November, the institutions were equipped with the necessary appliances. The institution in Świnoujście had 96 sleeping locations, and in Wolin, 40. Both had their own kitchens, with, respectively, 120 and 75 employees. The State Repatriation Office in Świnoujście ceased to exist on 5 December 1947.

The county existed until 1 January 1973, when it was partitioned between Kamień County, and the city of Świnoujście, which become the separate city county, additionally including Lubin, Wapnica, Wicko, Grodno, and the Wolin National Park.
