= Szczecin Voivodeship (1946–1975) =

Former voivodeship of Poland

Coordinates: 53°25′17″N 14°33′03″E

- Voivodeship of Poland
- 1946–1975
- The Szczecin Voivodeship within Poland, between 1950 and 1975.
- Capital: Szczecin
- Area
  - 1946: 30,251 km^{2} (11,680 sq mi)
  - 1950: 12,744 km^{2} (4,920 sq mi)
- Population
  - 1946: 892 600
  - 1974: 955 000
  - Type: Voivodeship
- History
  - Established: 28 June 1946
  - Disestablished: 31 May 1975
- Contained within
  - Country: Provisional Government of National Unity (1946–1947); Polish People's Republic (1947–1975)
Preceded by
District of the Western Pomerania
Gdańsk Voivodeship
Pomeranian Voivodeship
Succeeded by
Koszalin Voivodeship
Szczecin Voivodeship
Gorzów Voivodeship

The Szczecin Voivodeship (Note: Polish: Województwo szczecińskie) was a voivodeship (province) with its capital in Szczecin, that was centered on the Farther Pomerania. It existed from 1946 to 1975. Until 19 February 1947 it was under the administration of Provisional Government of National Unity, which then was replaced by the Polish People's Republic. It was established on 28 June 1946, when it was carved out of the territory of the District of the Western Pomerania, and parts of the Gdańsk, and Pomeranian Voivodeships. On 6 July 1950, its eastern half was incorporated into then-established Koszalin Voivodeship, and the voivodeship ceased to exist on 31 May 1975, when it was replaced by then-established Szczecin and Gorzów Voivodeships.

== History ==
The Szczecin Voivodeship within Poland, from 1946 to 1950.

The Szczecin Voivodeship was established on 28 June 1946, as one of the voivodeships (provinces) of Poland, under the administration of the Provisional Government of National Unity. It was formed within the borders of then-disestablished District of the Western Pomerania, additionally including a few counties from Gdańsk, and Pomeranian Voivodeships. Its capital was located in Szczecin. From the District of the Western Pomerania it incorporated the city county of Szczecin, and 25 land counties, that were: Białogard, Chojna, Choszczno, Drawsko, Gryfice, Gryfino, Kamień, Kołobrzeg, Koszalin, Łobez, Myślibórz, Nowogard, Pyrzyce, Stargard, Szczecin, Szczecinek, Wałcz, Wolin. From the Gdańsk Voivodeship, it incorporated the counties of Bytów, Miastko, Sławno, and Słupsk, and from the Pomeranian Voivodeship, it incorporated the counties of Człuchów, and Złotów. In 1946 it had an area of 30 251 km², being the second biggest voivodeship of Poland, only behind the Poznań Voivodeship, and was inhabited by 892 600 people. The German population of the region had been subjected to the expulsion, with the area being resettled with Polish population.

On 18 June 1946, the government branch office had been opened in Szczecinek, to help administer the counties of Białogard, Bytów, Człuchów, Drawsko, Koszalin, Miastko, Sławno, Słupsk, Szczecinek, Wałcz, and Złotów.

Until 25 September 1946, within the voivodeship functioned the Enclave of Police, a zone around the city of Police, that was under the military occupation of the Soviet Union, excluded from Polish administration.

On, 19 February 1947, the Provisional Government of National Unity was replaced by the Polish People's Republic.

On 2 February 1948, the mayor of Słupsk was granted rights for the city, to act as a city county. On 6 July 1950, the eastern half of the province had been partitioned into then-established Koszalin Voivodeship. It included the counties of Białogard, Bytów, Człuchów, Drawsko, Kołobrzeg, Koszalin, Miastko, Sławno, Słupsk, Szczecinek, Wałcz, and Złotów. As such the area of the Szczecin Voivodeship decreased over 58%, to 12 744 km². In 1950, it was inhabited by 529 295 people. Around 30% of the Polish population of the voivodeship, were people who were transferred from the Eastern Borderlands, an area then within the Soviet Union, that prior to the World War 2, was located within Polish borders.

On 1 October 1954 was established the Goleniów County, from the parts of the counties of Nowogard and Kamień. On 1 January 1973, the Wolin County had been partitioned between Kamień County, and the city of Świnoujście, which become the separate city county, additionally including Lubin, Wapnica, Wicko, Grodno, and the Wolin National Park. On 9 December 1973, the city of Stargard Szczeciński become the city county. In 1974, the voivodeship was inhabited by 955 000 people.

The Szczecin Voivodeship existed until 31 May 1975, when it was partitioned between then-established voivodeships of Szczecin and Gorzów

== Subdivisions ==
=== 1946–1950 ===
- Szczecin (city county)
- Słupsk (city county; 1948–1975)
- Białogard County (seat: Białogard)
- Bytów County (seat: Bytów)
- Chojna County (Dębno)
- Choszczno County (seat: Choszczno)
- Człuchów County (seat: Człuchów)
- Drawsko County (seat: Drawsko Pomorskie)
- Gryfice County (seat: Gryfice)
- Gryfino County (seat: Gryfino)
- Kamień County (seat: Kamień Pomorski)
- Kołobrzeg County (seat: Kołobrzeg)
- Koszalin County (seat: Koszalin)
- Łobez County (seat: Łobez)
- Miastko County (seat: Miastko)
- Mysliborz County (seat: Myślibórz)
- Nowogard County (seat: Nowogard)
- Pyrzyce County (seat: Pyrzyce)
- Sławno County (seat: Sławno)
- Słupsk County (seat: Słupsk)
- Stargard County (seat: Stargard Szczeciński)
- Szczecin County (seat: Szczecin)
- Szczecinek County (seat: Szczecinek)
- Wałcz County (seat: Wałcz)
- Wolin County (seat: Świnoujście)
- Złotów County (seat: Złotów)

=== 1950–1975 ===
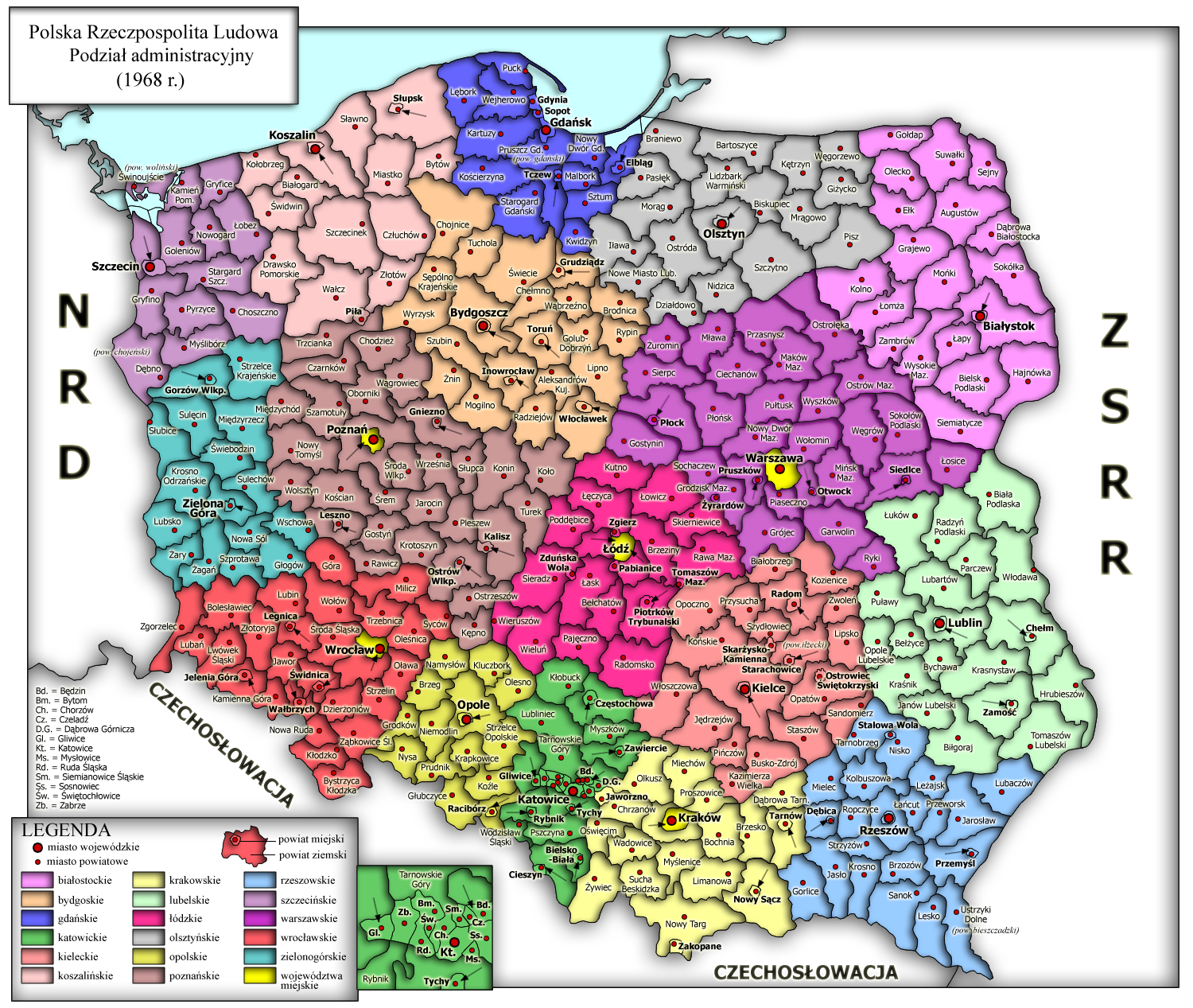
The counties of Poland in 1968, including the counties of the Szczecin Voivodeship.

- Szczecin (city county)
- Słupsk (city county; 1948–1975)
- Stargard Szczeciński (city county; 1973–1975)
- Świnoujście (city county; 1973–1975)
- Chojna County (seat: Dębno)
- Choszczno County (seat: Choszczno)
- Gryfice County (seat: Gryfice)
- Gryfino County (seat: Gryfino)
- Goleniów County (seat: Świdwin; 1954–1975)
- Kamień County (seat: Kamień Pomorski)
- Łobez County (seat: Łobez)
- Mysliborz County (seat: Myślibórz)
- Nowogard County (seat: Nowogard)
- Pyrzyce County (seat: Pyrzyce)
- Stargard County (seat: Stargard Szczeciński)
- Szczecin County (seat: Szczecin)
- Wolin County (seat: Świnoujście; 1946–1973)

== Demographics ==
Year	Population		
Year	Total	Urban (%)	Rural (%)
1946	892 567	307 468 (34.45%)	585 099 (65.55%)
1950	529 295	296 045 (55.93%)	233 250 (44.07%)
1956	683 000	400 000 (58.6%)	283 000 (41.4%)
1960	757 884	470 272 (62.05%)	287 612 (37.95%)
1963	818 000	519 000 (63.4%)	299 000 (36.6%)
1965	847 600	no data	no data
1970	898 345	598 019 (66.57%)	300 326 (33.43%)
1971	908 300	608 200 (67%)	300 100 (33%)
1972	922 600	621 600 (67.4%)	301 000 (32.6%)
1973	940 000	637 000 (67.8%)	303 000 (32.2%)
1974	955 000	651 000 (68.2%)	304 000 (31.8%)

== Leaders ==
From 1946 to 1950, the leader of the voivodeship was the voivode. In 1950, the office of the voivode, together with several others, had been disestablished. As such, from 1950, to 1973, the leader was the chairperson of the Voivodeship National Council. The office of the voivode was reestablished in 1973, and functioned until the disestablishment of the voivodeship in 1975.

The people in the office of the voivode, from 1946 to 1950 were:

- 28 June 1946 – 14 February 1949: Leonard Borkowicz;
- 15 February 1949 – 27 May 1950: Włodzimierz Migoń.

The people in the office of the chairperson of the Voivodeship National Council, from 1950 to 1973, were:

- 1 January 1950 – 12 July 1951: Tadeusz Żabiński;
- 12 July 1951 – 4 December 1952: Franciszek Nowak;
- 4 December 1952 – 9 April 1957: Stanisław Gałka;
- 9 December 1957 – 19 February 1962: Włodzimierz Migoń;
- 19 February 1962 – 3 August 1971: Marian Łempicki;
- 3 August 1971 – 15 March 1973: Stanisław Rychlik;
- 16 March 1973 – 17 December 1973: Jerzy Kuczyński.

The people in the office of the voivode, from 1973 to 1975 were:

- 17 December 1973 – 31 May 1975: Jerzy Kuczyński.
