= Veletian County =

Former county of Poland

- County of District of Western Pomerania
- 1945–1946
- Capital: Nowe Warpno
- History
  - Established: 4 October 1945
  - Incorporation into Szczecin County: 29 May 1946
- Contained within
  - Country: Poland
  - District: Western Pomerania
Preceded by	Succeeded by
Ueckermünde District	Szczecin County

Veletian County (Note: Polish: powiat wielecki, powiat welecki, until 1946 also known as obwód wielecki, and obwód welecki) was a county of the District of Western Pomerania, within Poland, during the administration of the Provisional Government of National Unity. Its capital was Nowe Warpno. It existed from 4 October 1945 to 29 May 1946.

== History ==
It was established on 4 October 1945, from western part of Ueckermünde District, that was part of the territory ceased to Poland, after the fall of Nazi Germany. The eastern part of the former Ueckermünde District was ceased to the Enclave of Police. The county stretched from the border of the Soviet occupation zone of Germany on the west, to the administrative boundaries of the city of Szczecin on the east. It was named after the tribe of Veleti, that inhabited the area from the 8th to 10th century. Nowe Warpno become the capital of the county. As the German population was subjected to the expulsion from Poland, the area was resettled with Polish population. As the county was located at the German border, it was reserved for the military settlement, which included demilitarised soldiers, and then their families, and people resettled from the Eastern Borderlands. The county existed until 29 May 1946, when it was incorporated into then-established Szczecin County.
