= Lisa Davis (businesswoman) =

American businesswoman (born 1963)

Lisa A. Davis
- Born: October 15, 1963 (age 61)
- Education: University of California, Berkeley
- Title: Chair of Siemens (USA)
- Term: 2017–

Lisa A. Davis (born October 15, 1963) is an American businesswoman, the chair of Siemens Corporation (USA) since January 2017. Davis was a member of the managing board of Siemens, and global CEO of Siemens Gas and Power Operating Company.

== Early life ==
Lisa Davis was born in the US on October 15, 1963. She earned a bachelor's degree in chemical engineering from the University of California, Berkeley.

== Career ==
After graduating from university, Davis became an engineer for ExxonMobil, where she managed operations at the Prudhoe Bay Oil Field, and later worked for Texaco and Royal Dutch Shell.

In November 2016, it was announced that Davis would succeed Eric Spiegel as CEO of Siemens USA following his retirement at the end of the year.

In 2018, she was assessed as being the 37th most powerful woman in the world by Forbes. After profits in Siemens' energy division went down by 75% in 2018, the company decided to separate the division into its own company. In 2019, she became co-CEO of Siemens Gas and Power Operating Company. She left the Siemens managing board in February 2020 to support Siemens CEO Kaeser until her contract expired in October 2020.
