= Chojna County =

Former county of Poland

- County of the District of Western Pomerania and Szczecin Voivodeship
- 1945–1975
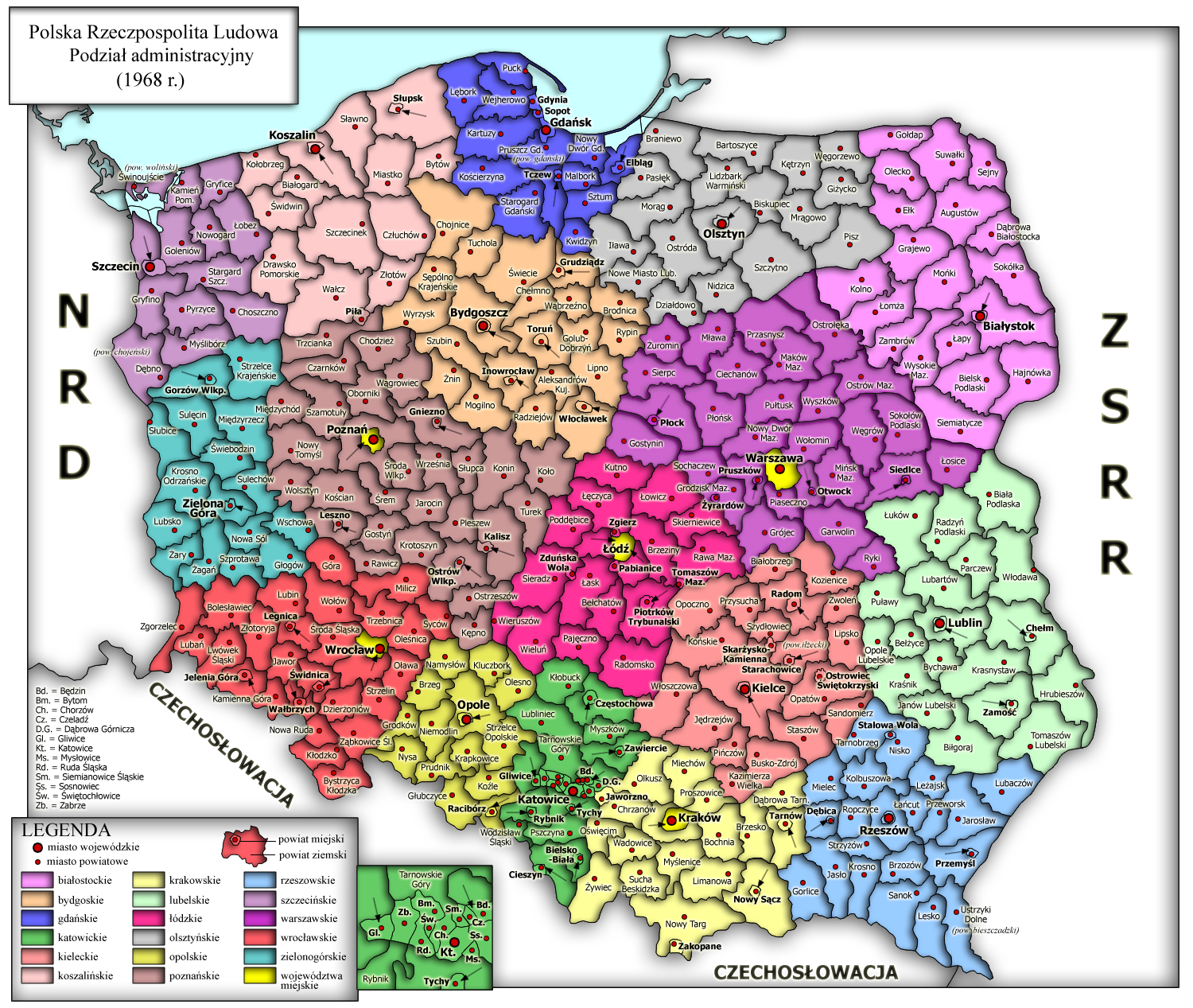
- Counties of Poland in 1968, including Chojna County.
- Capital: Chojna (1945); Dębno (1945–1975)
- Area
  - Coordinates: 52°44′08″N 14°42′08″E
  - 1946: 1,374 km^{2} (531 sq mi)
- Population
  - 1946: 19,537
  - 1973: 53,000
- Government
  - Type: County
- History
  - Established: 1945
  - Transfer of the county seat from Chojna to Dębno: 7 July 1945
  - Disestablished: 1 June 1975
- Contained within
  - Country: Provisional Government of the Republic of Poland (1945–1946); Provisional Government of National Unity (1946–1947); Polish People's Republic (1947–1975)
  - District: Western Pomerania (1945–1946)
  - Voivodeship: Szczecin (1946–1975)
Preceded by	Succeeded by
Königsberg Neumark District	Szczecin Voivodeship; Gorzów Voivodeship

Chojna County (Polish pronunciation: [ˈxɔj.na]; Polish: Powiat chojeński) was a county in Poland, centered around the towns of Chojna and Dębno, which existed from 1945 to 1975. It formed a subdivision in the District of Western Pomerania until 1946, and in Szczecin Voivodeship from 1946 to 1975. Its seat was located in the towns of Dębno, and briefly in 1945, Chojna. It had a population of 19,537 in 1946, and 53,000 in 1973, and the area of 1,374 km^{2} (530.5 sq mi). Currently, its former territory is under the administration of the counties of Gryfino and Myślibórz, located in West Pomeranian Voivodeship, Poland.

== History ==
The area used to be under the administration of Königsberg Neumark District within the Province of Brandenburg in Germany. It was captured by the Red Army of the Soviet Union in February 1945, during the Vistula–Oder offensive of the Second World War. It was afterwards placed under the administration of the Provisional Government of the Republic of Poland, with Chojna County being established as a subdivision of the District of Western Pomerania. Its seat was set in the town of Chojna, however, due to the devastation of the city during the conflict, it was moved to the town of Dębno on 7 July 1945. The county also included the towns of Boleszkowice (a village since 1972), Cedynia, Mieszkowice, Moryń, and Trzcińsko-Zdrój.

The original German population of the county fled and was subject to expulsion during the conflict. It was resettled with Polish population, being originally reserved for the members of the military and their families. It had a population of 19,537 people in 1946, and 53,000 in 1973. The county had the an area of 1,374 km ^{2} (530.5 sq mi).

The District of Western Pomerania was disestablished on 28 June 1946, and replaced by Szczecin Voivodeship. On 28 June 1945, the Provisional Government of the Republic of Poland was replaced by the Provisional Government of National Unity, which then was replaced by the Polish People's Republic on 19 February 1947. The county existed until 1 June 1975, when it was abolished due to the new administrative reform, with its territory being partitioned between then-established Gorzów and Szczecin Voivodeships.

Currently, since 1 January 1999, its former area is under the administration of the counties of Gryfino and Myślibórz, located in West Pomeranian Voivodeship, Poland.
