= Bolduanus =

Bibliographer and pastor from Pomerania

Paulus Bolduanus (also Paul or Bolduan, among other variations; c. 1563 – 1622 or later) was a pastor and bibliographer who lived in Pomerania.

Bolduanus was born around 1563 and lived to at least 1622. He entered a theological school in a place called Stolpe in Pomerania (possibly Pomerania-Stolp or Landkreis Stolp) in 1579 at age 16. He became a Lutheran minister in Vessin in 1598.

Bolduanus published three bibliographies between 1614 and 1622: Bibliotheca theologica (1614), Bibliotheca philosophica (1616), and Bibliotheca historica (1620). The first two were published in Jena and the latter in Leipzig. He may also have written genealogies of Pomeranian nobles.

Bibliotheca philosophica, which Archer Taylor calls the "third large general subject-index to be compiled", is a selective bibliography of philosophical texts. It covers "all subjects other than theology, law, and medicine". It contains extensive discussion of works associated with Ramism. Bolduanus's sources for Bibliotheca philosophica may have included Nomenclator scriptorum philosophicorum atque philologicorum, a bibliography by Israel Spach; and catalogues of books at the Frankfurt Book Fair. Its index is organized by the trivium and quadrivium.

In the 18th century, Bolduanus's reputation was mixed. Johann Albert Fabricius favoured Bolduanus; Burkhard Gotthelf Struve did not.

== Sources ==
- Jasenas, Michael (1973). A History of the Bibliography of Philosophy. Hildesheim: Georg Olms Verlag. ISBN 3-487-04666-0. OCLC 703469.
- Krummel, Donald William (1972). Bibliotheca Bolduaniana: A Renaissance Music Bibliography. Detroit: Information Coordinators. ISBN 0-911772-46-4. OCLC 532131.
- Taylor, Archer (11 January 2017) [1966]. General Subject-Indexes Since 1548. University of Pennsylvania Press. doi:10.9783/9781512818963. ISBN 978-1-5128-1896-3.
