= Szczecin Voivodeship =

Szczecin Voivodeship may also refer to:

- Szczecin Voivodeship (1946–1975)
- Szczecin Voivodeship (1975–1998)
- West Pomeranian Voivodeship, with the capital in Szczecin
