= Wicko =

Ognica may refer to the following places:

- Wicko, Pomeranian Voivodeship, Gmina Wicko, Pomeranian Voivodeship (north Poland)
- Wicko, West Pomeranian Voivodeship, Gmina Międzyzdroje, West Pomeranian Voivodeship (north-west Poland)
- Wicko (lake), Gmina Postomino, Sławno County, West Pomeranian Voivodeship, Poland
