= Farther Pomerania =

Historical region in Poland

Farther Pomerania Pomorze Tylne
- Historical region
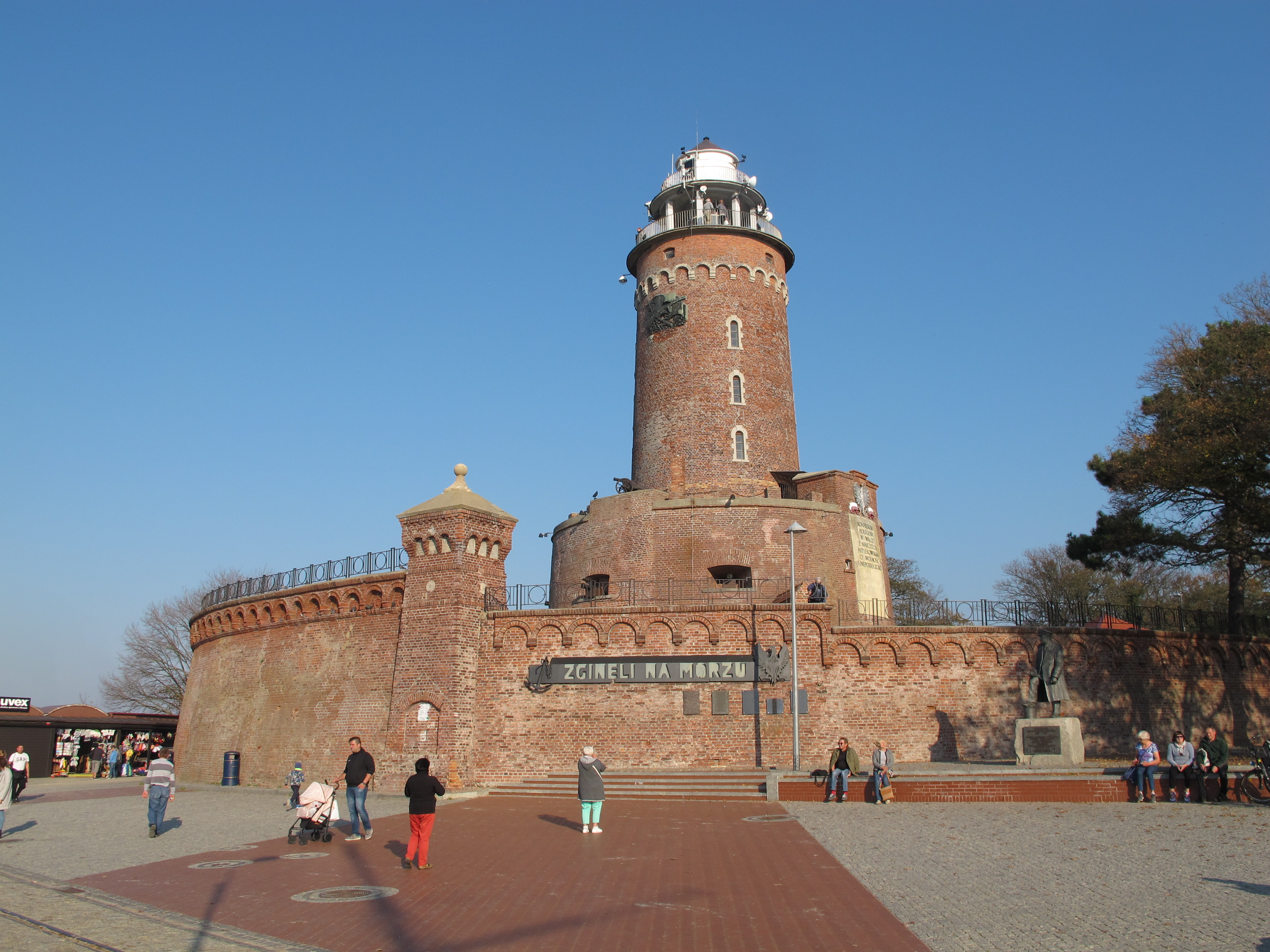
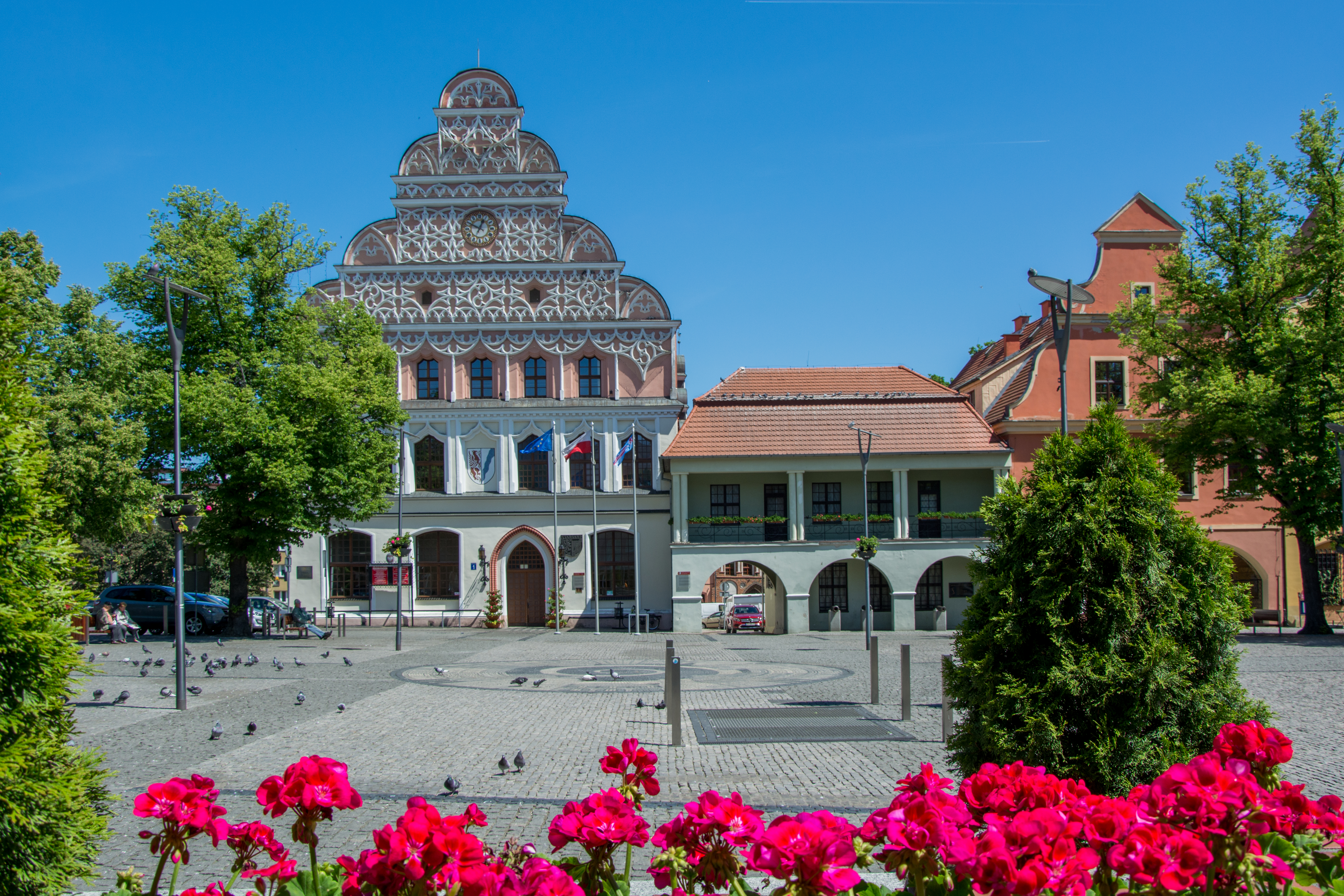
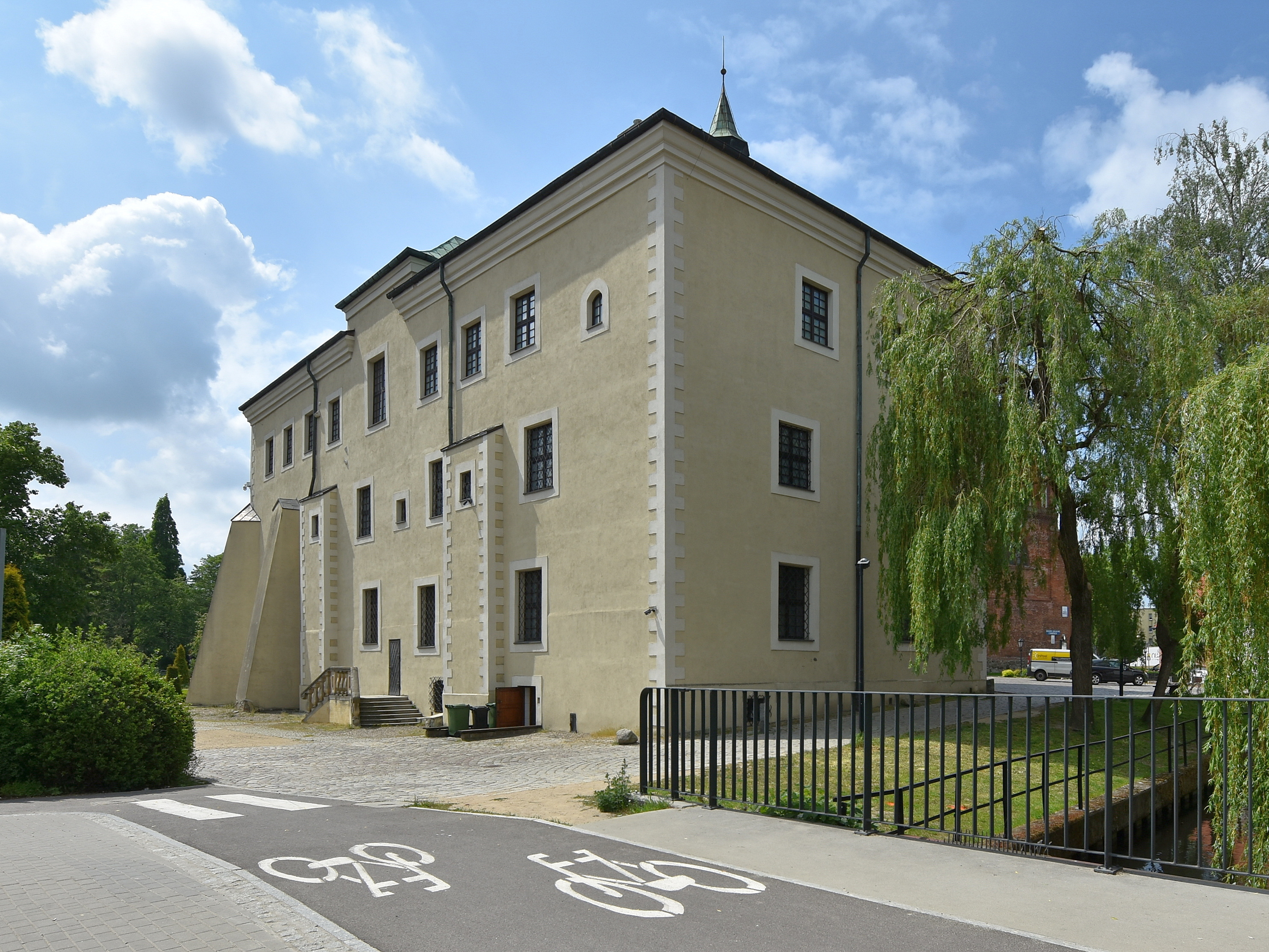
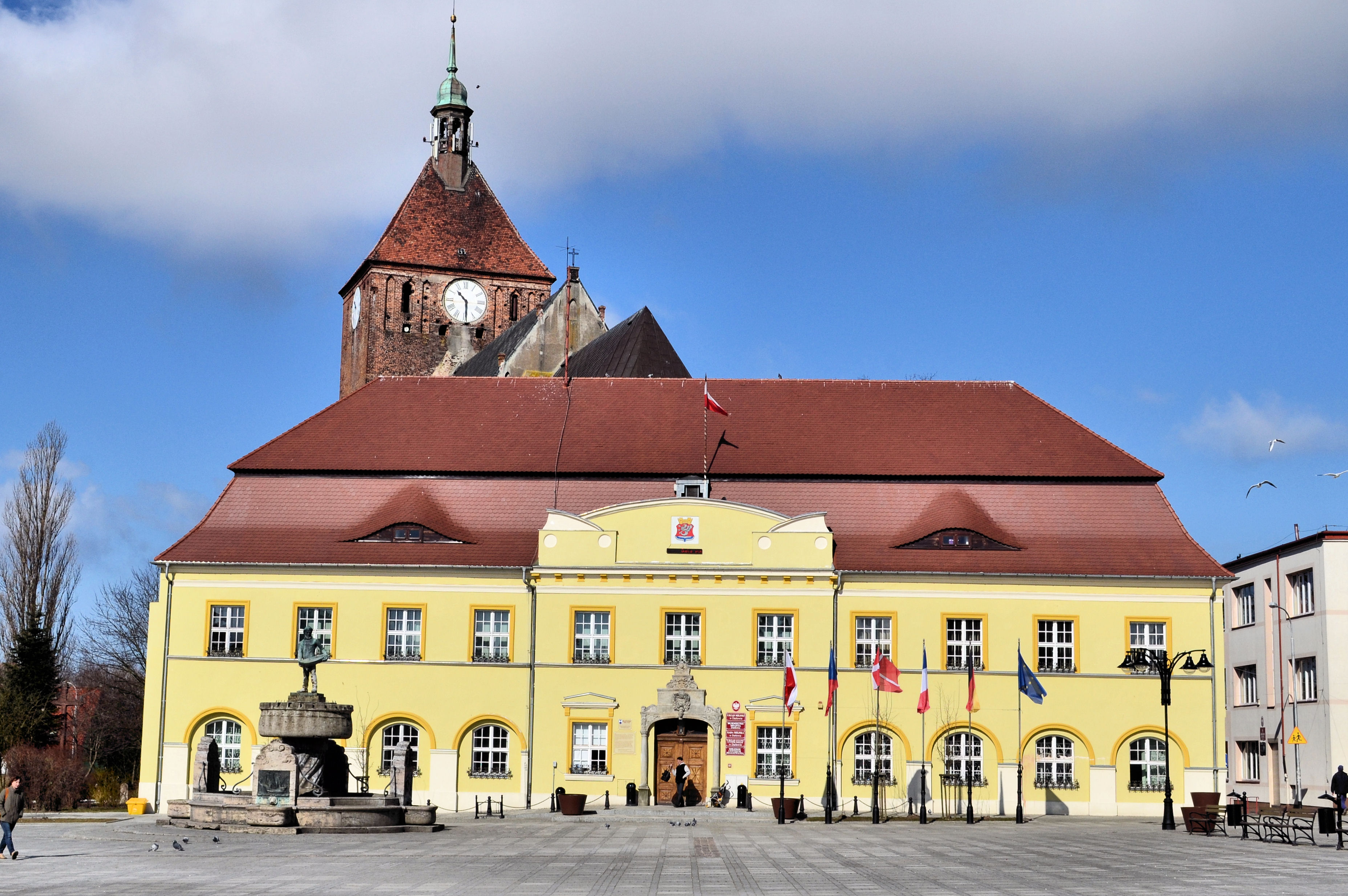
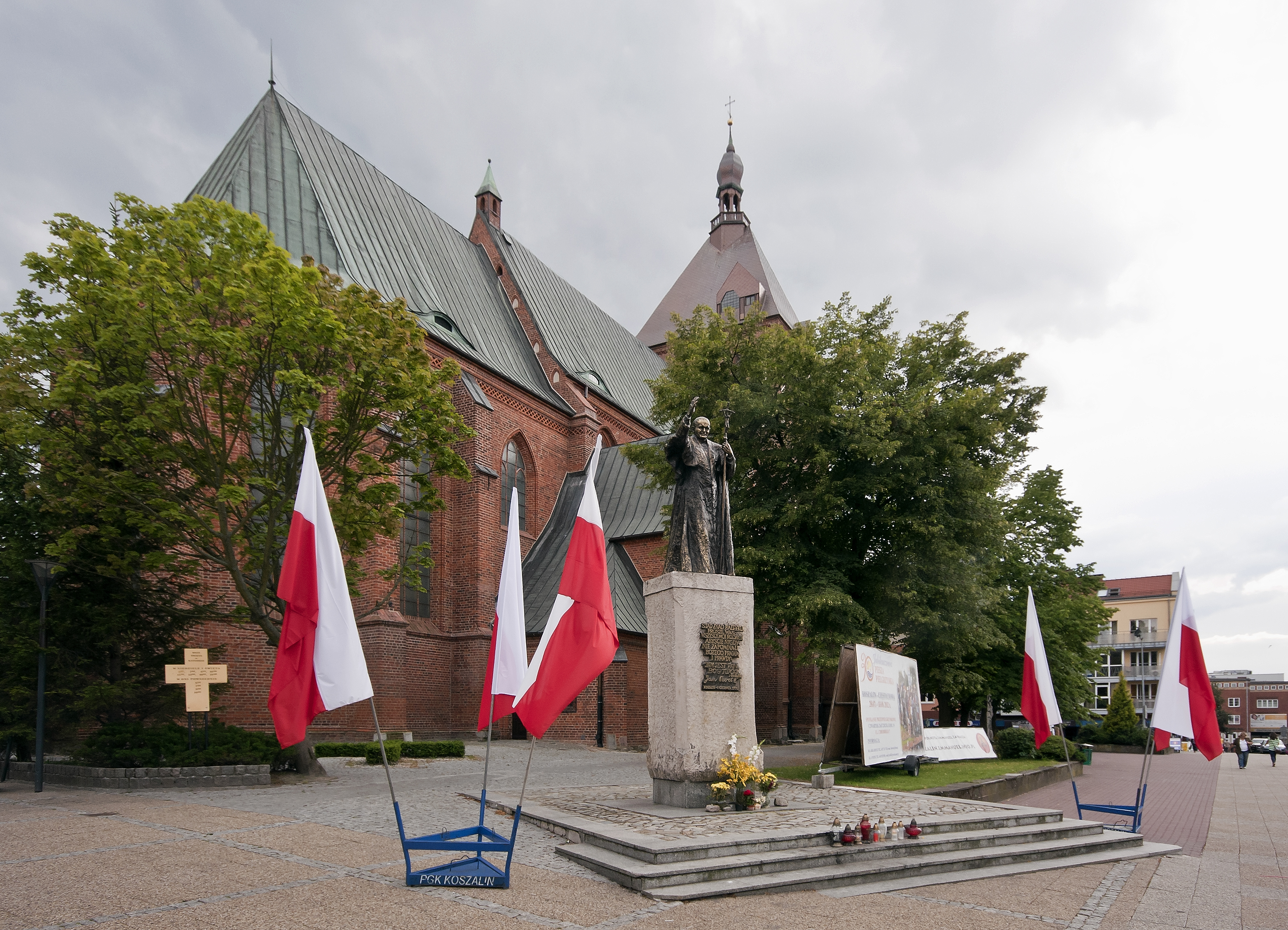
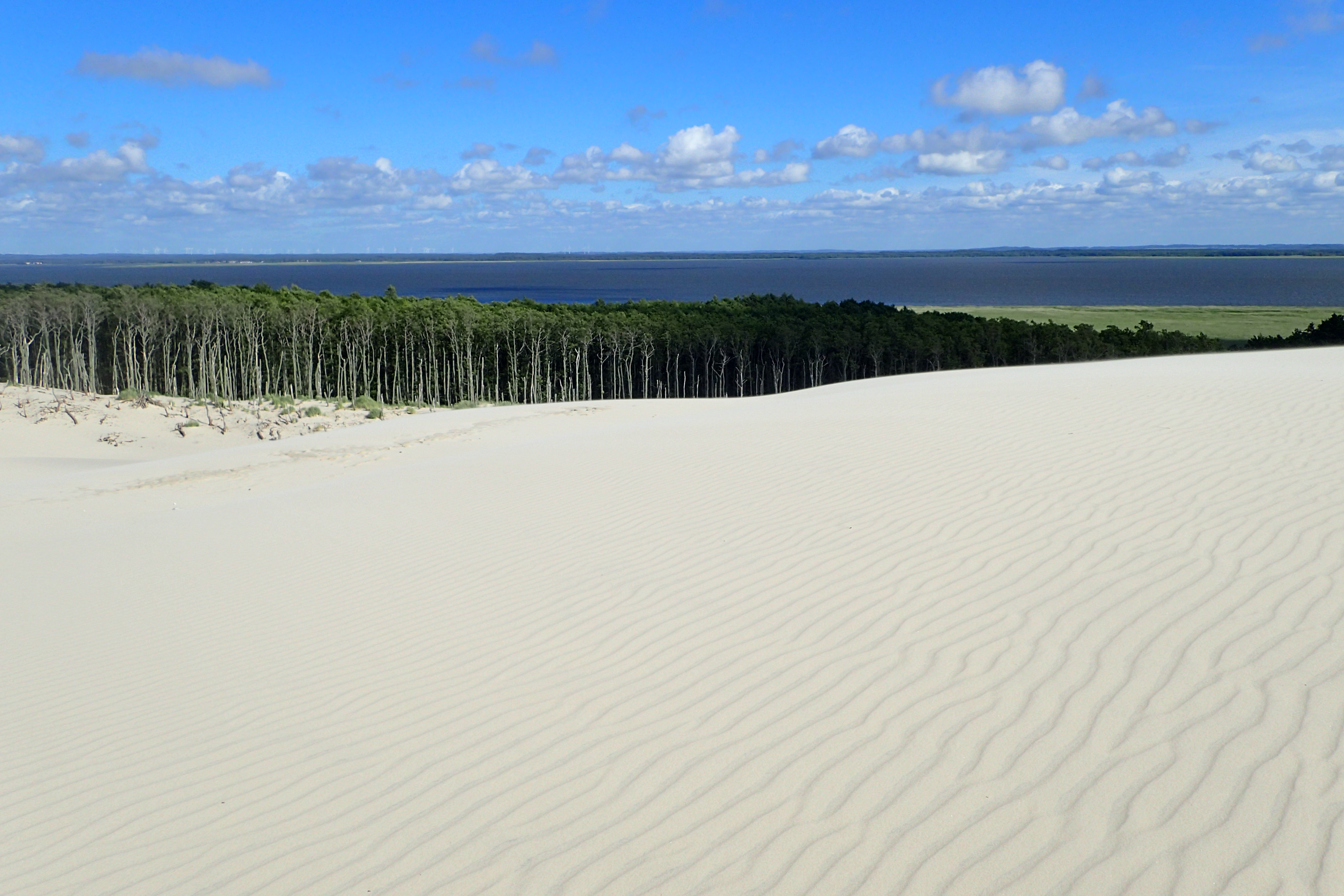
- Kołobrzeg Lighthouse Stargard Market Square Słupsk Castle Darłowo Town Hall Koszalin Cathedral Slovincian National Park

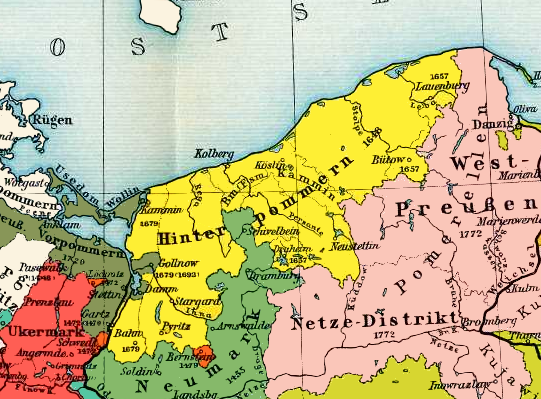
- Farther Pomerania in 1800 (in yellow)
- Country: Poland
- Historical region: Pomerania
- Largest city: Koszalin
- Time zone: UTC+1 (CET)
  - Summer (DST): UTC+2 (CEST)

Farther Pomerania, Hinder Pomerania, Rear Pomerania or Eastern Pomerania (Polish: Pomorze Tylne; German: Hinterpommern, Ostpommern), is a subregion of the historic region of Pomerania in north-western Poland, mostly within the West Pomeranian Voivodeship, while its easternmost parts are within the Pomeranian Voivodeship.

It is the part of Pomerania which comprised the eastern part of the Duchy and later Province of Pomerania. It stretched roughly from the Oder River in the West to Pomerelia in the East. The Polish term Pomorze Zachodnie ("Western Pomerania") is colloquially used in contemporary Poland as a synonym for the West Pomeranian Voivodship whose borders do not match the historical ones; in Polish historical usage, it applied to all areas west of Pomerelia (i.e. to the entire narrow Pomerania).

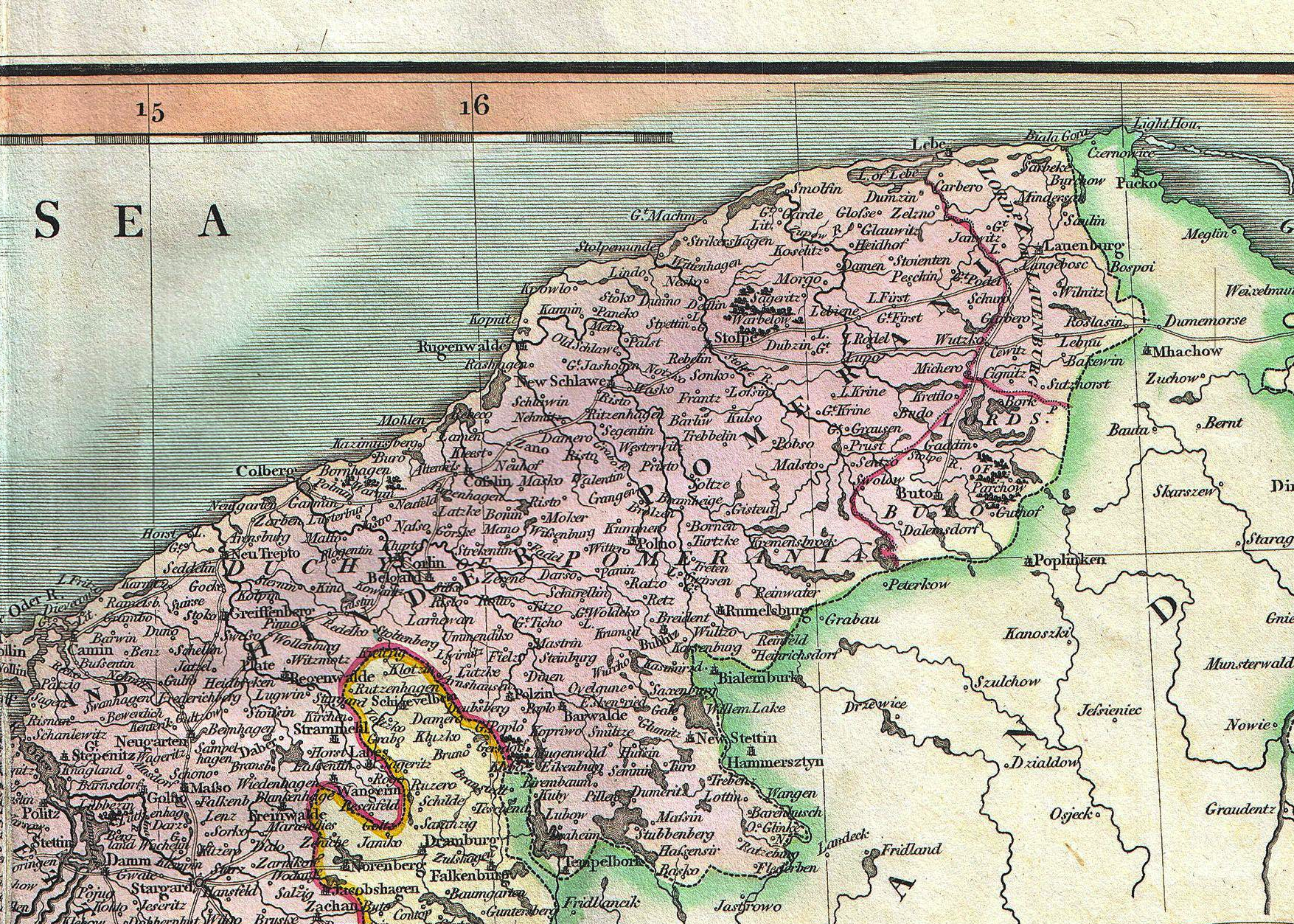
Map of Farther Pomerania of 1801, on the r. h. s. the Lauenburg and Bütow Lands (identified as Lordship of Lauenburg and Lordship of Buto, respectively, western border marked in red).

Farther Pomerania emerged as a subdivision of the Duchy of Pomerania in the partition of 1532, then known as Pomerania-Stettin (Szczecin) and already including the historical regions Principality of Cammin (Kamień), County of Naugard (Nowogard), Land of Słupsk-Sławno, and with ties to the Lębork and Bytów Land. After the Brandenburg-Swedish partition of Pomerania, Farther Pomerania became the Brandenburg-Prussian Province of Pomerania (1653–1815). After the reorganization of the Prussian Province of Pomerania in 1815, Farther Pomerania was administered as Regierungsbezirk Köslin (Koszalin). In 1938, northern part of the dissolved Grenzmark Posen-West Prussia was merged in.

After Germany’s defeat in World War II the region was returned to the Polish state as a result of the border decisions confirmed at the Potsdam Conference (July–August 1945). The implementation of the Potsdam decisions led to the transfer of the former German administration and to large demographic changes: German civilians left or were removed from the territories east of the Oder–Neisse line, while new Polish civil authorities, municipal services and legal institutions were established in their place.

The postwar period was dominated by reconstruction and the organisation of public life under Polish administration. Debris clearance, restoration of roads and public buildings, reopening of schools and cultural institutions, and the reestablishment of local government bodies were carried out amid shortages of housing and resources. Polish state authorities and local administrations also launched programmes to integrate the recovered territories into the national economy and to re-establish land and property registration under Polish law.

Many of the new inhabitants came from central Poland and from the eastern borderlands that had been incorporated into the Soviet Union. These population movements were part of the broader transfers and resettlements taking place across Central and Eastern Europe between 1944 and 1947.

Administratively, the late 20th century saw several reforms. Before the 1999 reform, the area corresponding largely to historic Farther Pomerania was administered as the Szczecin Voivodeship and its subsequent divisions, such as Koszalin Voivodeship and Słupsk Voivodeship. Under the 1998 reform (effective 1 January 1999) these units were reorganised: the former Szczecin and Koszalin territories were largely incorporated into the newly created West Pomeranian Voivodeship, while much of the former Słupsk Voivodeship became part of the Pomeranian Voivodeship.

== Terminology ==
The German prefix Hinter- (cf. hinterland) denotes a location more distant from the speaker, and is the equivalent of "Hinder"/"Rear"/"Farther" in English and Posterior/Ulterior/Trans- in Latin (with the corresponding antonyms in German, English and Latin being Vor-, "Fore"/"Front"/"Hither" and Anterior/Citerior/Cis-, respectively).

The toponym Pomerania comes from Slavic po more, which means Land at the Sea. Initially, Farther Pomerania referred to the areas beyond (i.e. lying east of) Pomerania-Wolgast, and the name eventually became adopted for areas east of Szczecin by the 16th century. When the 1648 Peace of Westphalia and the Treaty of Stettin (1653) divided the Duchy of Pomerania into its Western, Swedish and Eastern Brandenburgian parts, Farther Pomerania was used for the latter - in opposition to Swedish Hither Pomerania (Vorpommern) including Stettin (Szczecin), Wollin (Wolin) and a strip of land east of the Oder River, ultimately limited to include two suburbs of Szczecin, namely the towns of Gollnow (Goleniów) and Damm/Alt-Damm/Altdamm (Dąbie). To the East, Farther Pomerania stretches to the border with Pomerelia, considered by the Polish historiography to be located on the river Łeba.

In the post-1945 era, Farther Pomerania was affected by the Polish-German border shift. Before, it happened to be the Eastern part of German Pomerania (Pommern, consisting of Hither and Farther Pomerania), yet thereafter it became the Western part of Polish Pomerania (Pomorze, consisting of Pomerania and Pomerelia). As Polish Pomorze has also been in use for Pomerelia, while Hither and Farther Pomerania are jointly referred to as West Pomerania (Pomorze Zachodnie) in Poland, located predominantly in today's West Pomeranian Voivodeship, including Szczecin and Wolin. However, this term is not being adopted by the Germans, as only Hither Pomerania is considered to be Western Pomerania, so Farther Pomerania is still in use.

== Cities and towns ==
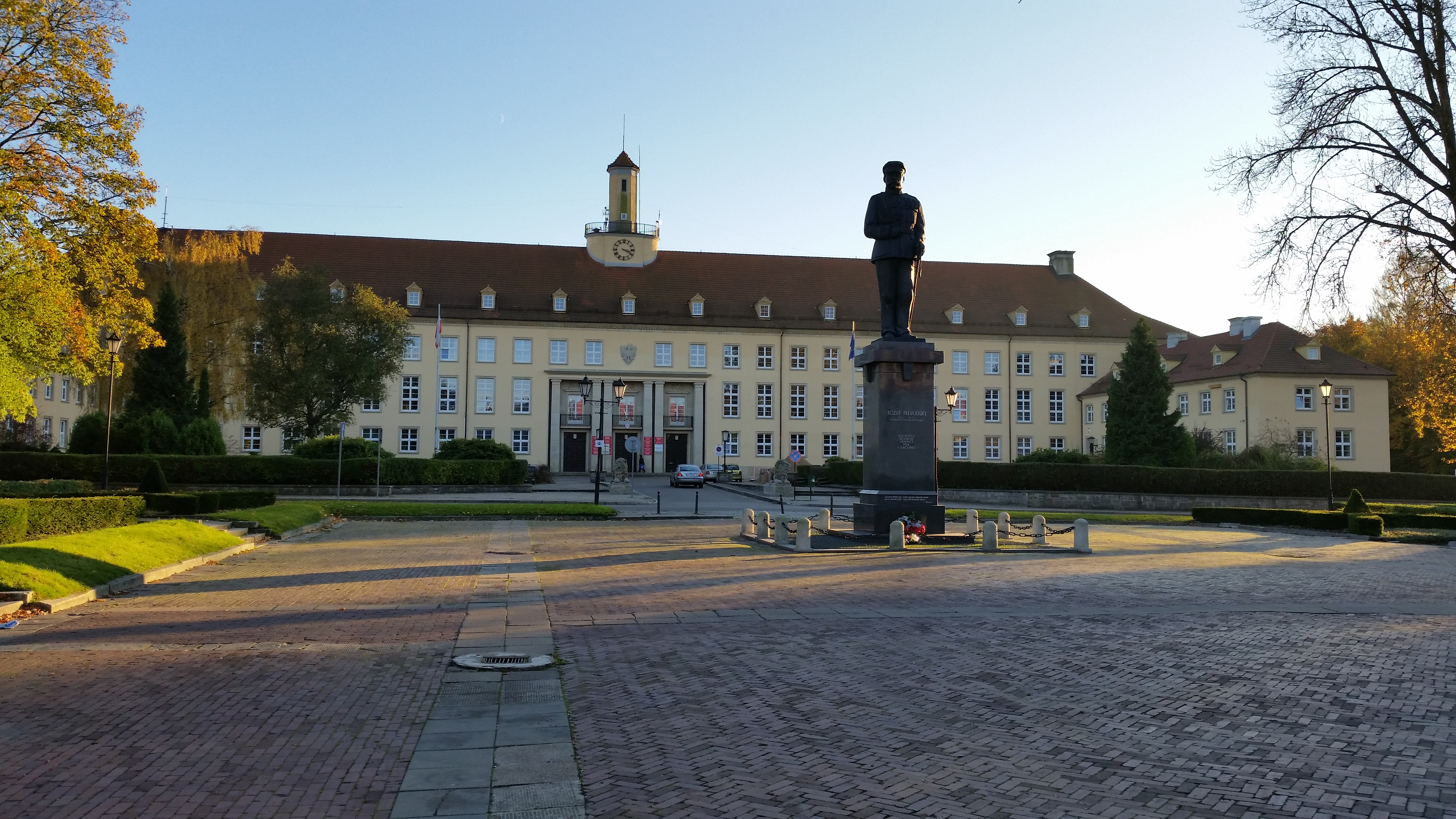
Victory Square with the statue of Józef Piłsudski and the former Koszalin Voivodeship Office in Koszalin, the largest city of the region

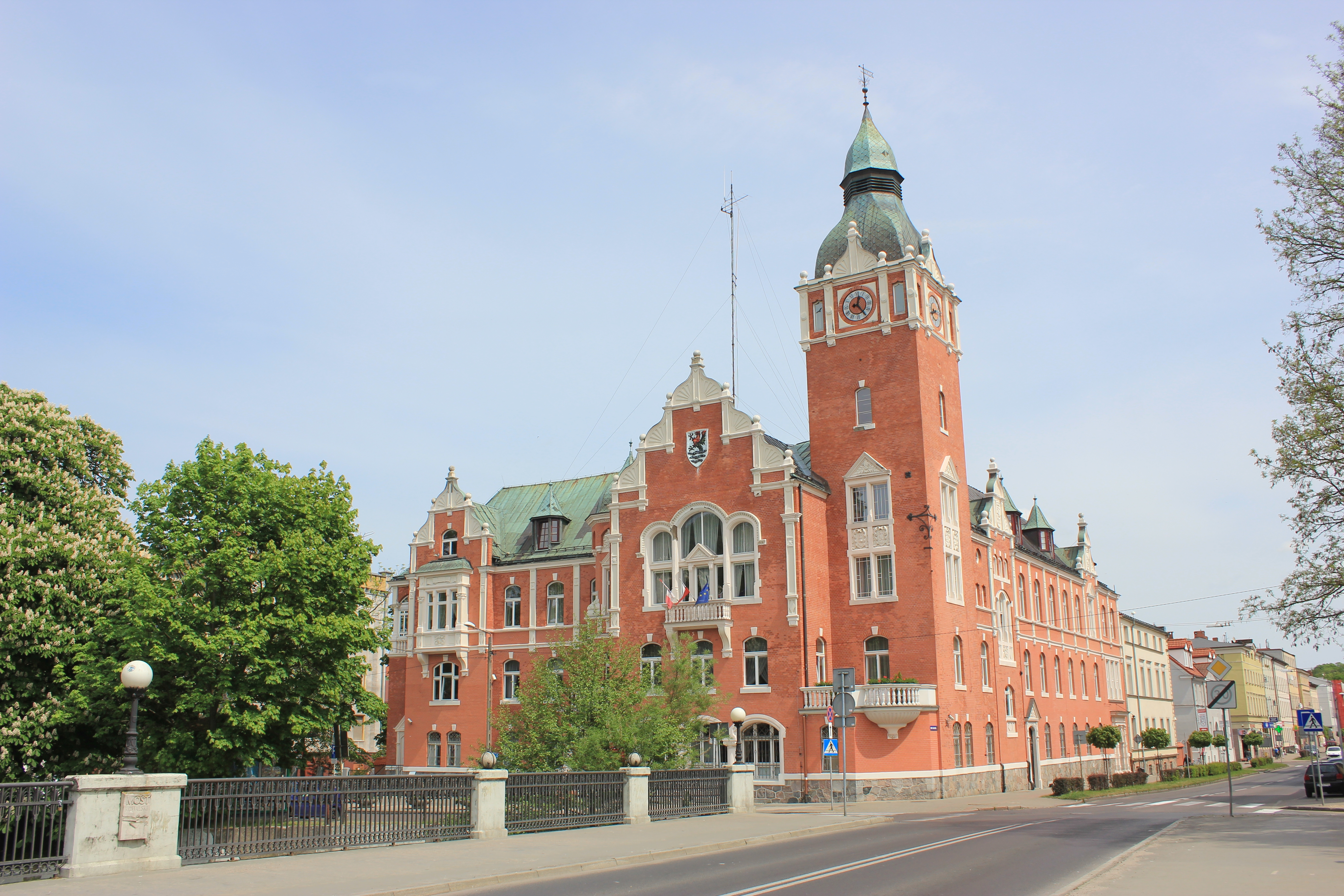
County office in Słupsk, the second largest city of the region

There are four cities in Farther Pomerania, namely:

- Kołobrzeg
- Koszalin
- Stargard
- Słupsk

Towns of Farther Pomerania include:

- Barwice (Note: Part of Greater Poland in the Middle Ages. Part of Pomerania since 1477.)
- Białogard
- Bobolice
- Chociwel
- Darłowo
- Dobra
- Dobrzany
- Drawno (Note: Part of Greater Poland in the 12th century. Part of Pomerania in the 10th–11th centuries and since 1469.)
- Drawsko Pomorskie
- Golczewo
- Gościno
- Gryfice
- Gryfino
- Kalisz Pomorski (Note: Part of Greater Poland in the Middle Ages. Part of Pomerania since 1816.)
- Kamień Pomorski
- Karlino
- Kępice
- Kobylnica
- Łobez
- Maszewo
- Miastko
- Mielno
- Nowogard
- Okonek
- Płoty
- Polanów
- Połczyn-Zdrój
- Pyrzyce
- Resko
- Sianów
- Sławno
- Stepnica
- Suchań
- Szczecinek
- Świdwin
- Trzebiatów
- Tychowo
- Ustka
- Węgorzyno
- Złocieniec

In addition, the following towns are located in the historical Lębork and Bytów Land, thus being treated as part of Pomerelia/Gdańsk Pomerania by the Polish historiography, and as part of Farther Pomerania by the German historiography:

- Bytów
- Lębork
- Łeba

== Historical languages and dialects ==
- primarily German, Ostpommersch variant of Low German
- in easternmost rural areas Kashubian
- Slovincian dialect in the rural areas of Łeba and Lębork, roughly Germanized by 1850.

== History (timeline) ==
- 960s Pomerania became part of the emerging Polish state under its first ruler Mieszko I.
- 1000 Diocese of Kołobrzeg founded by Bolesław I the Brave, along with the dioceses of Wrocław and Kraków and the Archdiocese of Gniezno, as one of the oldest Polish dioceses (the only older diocese being the diocese of Poznań, established in 968).
- 1317 Słupsk and Sławno Land become part of the Duchy of Pomerania (before 1347 as a fief of the margraves of Brandenburg)
- 1466 Lębork and Bytów Land is handed by Poland over to the Duchy of Pomerania as a fief, in reward for supporting Poland in the Thirteen Years' War war against the Teutonic Order State
- 1532 Partition of the Duchy of Pomerania, Farther Pomerania becomes Pomerania-Stettin
- 1630 Swedish occupation following the Treaty of Stettin (1630)
- 1637 Lębork and Bytów Land is reincorporated directly into Poland to become part of the Pomeranian Voivodeship
- 1648 Brandenburg-Prussia and the Swedish Empire agree on a partition of Pomerania in the Peace of Westphalia

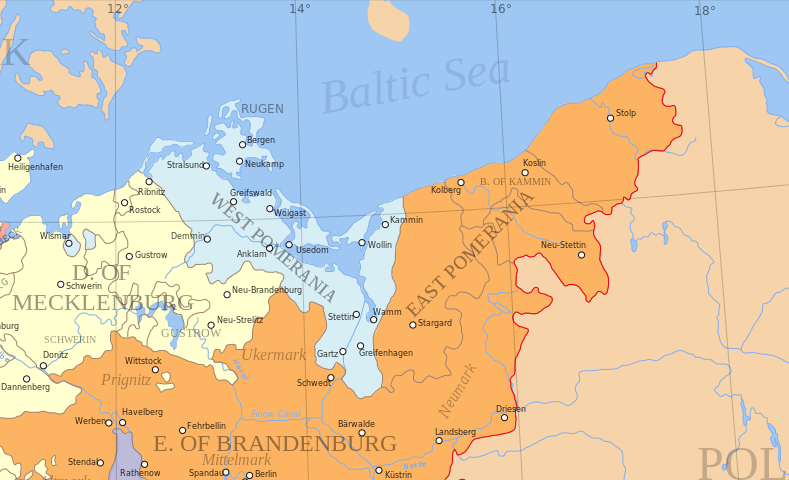
Brandenburgian Farther Pomerania after the Treaty of Stettin (1653) shown in orange

- 1653 Treaty of Stettin (1653): Farther Pomerania becomes Brandenburg-Prussia's Province of Pomerania
- 1657 Lębork and Bytów Land is pawned by Poland to Brandenburg-Prussia
- 1771 Lębork and Bytów Land is annexed by the King in Prussia and is integrated into the Province of Pomerania of the Kingdom of Prussia
- 1772-1773 in the course of First Partition of Poland, Lębork and Bytów (Lauenburg and Bütow) Land is reattached to the former Royal Prussia (now renamed West Prussia)
- 1777 Lębork and Bytów (Lauenburg and Bütow) Land is ultimately disentangled from West Prussia and made part of the Province of Pomerania of the Kingdom of Prussia, but remains a part of the Roman Catholic Diocese of Chełmno
- 1815 Farther Pomerania administered as Regierungsbezirk Köslin within the reorganized Prussian Province of Pomerania
- 1919 Treaty of Versailles - the bulk of Pomerelia, as well as minor parts of the Stolp, Lauenburg and Bütow districts are awarded to the re-established Polish state; the bulk of Farther Pomerania, Lauenburg and Bütow Land, as well as minor parts of the remainder of Pomerelian lands remain part of Germany
- 1923 Lauenburg and Bütow Land, along with those of the remainder of Pomerelian lands which were made part of the new Grenzmark Posen-West Prussia, is disentangled from the (once again Polish) Roman Catholic Diocese of Chełmno and made part of the Apostolic Administration of Tütz (later transformed into the Prelature of Schneidemühl)
- 1938
  - northern part of the dissolved Grenzmark Posen-West Prussia merged in
  - Germanisation camp for kidnapped predominantly Polish children founded by Nazi Germany in Połczyn-Zdrój.

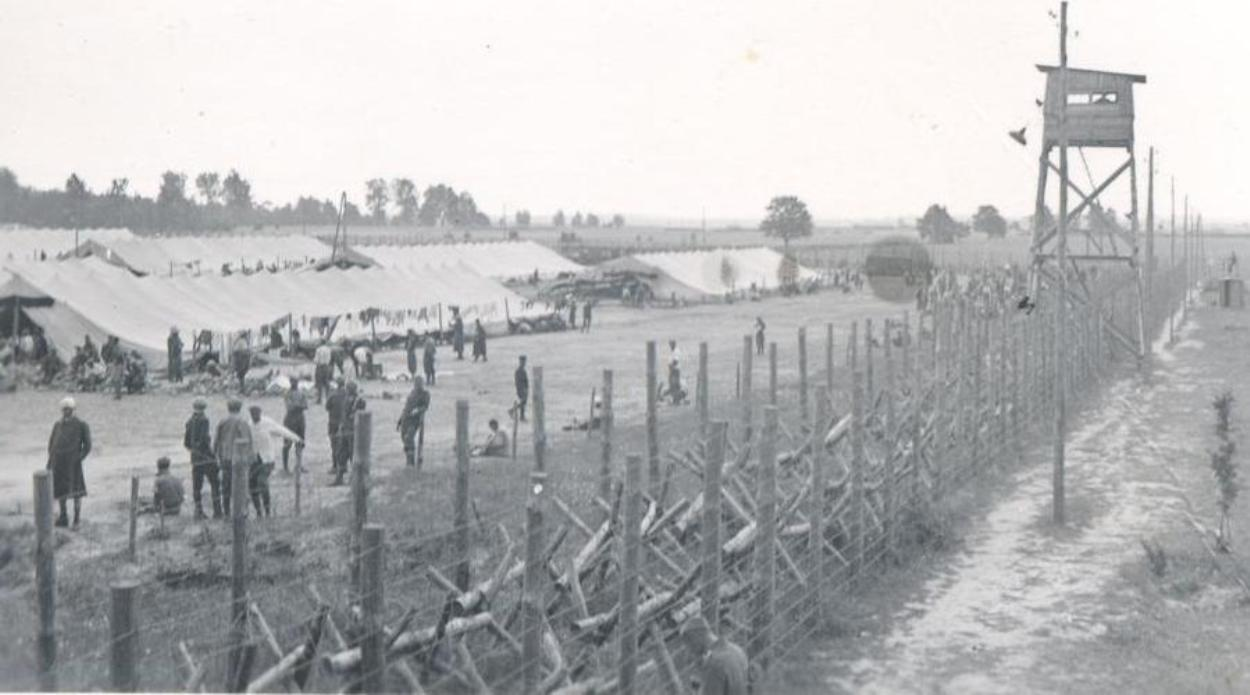
Stalag II-D prisoner-of-war camp in Stargard during World War II

- 1939 Stalag II-D, a major prisoner-of-war camp for Polish POWs and civilians, and later also for other Allied POWs, including Americans, French, Dutch, Belgians, Serbs, Soviet, Italians, Canadians, established by Nazi Germany in Stargard with numerous forced labour subcamps in the region.
- 1943 Stalag Luft 7 prisoner-of-war camp for Allied POWs established by Nazi Germany in Morzyczyn.
- 1944 Stalag Luft 7 camp relocated to Bąków.
- 1945
  - Stalag II-D and Stalag Luft IV POW camps dissolved.
  - German-perpetrated death marches of prisoners of the Stutthof concentration camp, and Stalag XX-B and Stalag Luft IV POW camps, passed through the region.
  - Germanisation camp for kidnapped Polish children in Połczyn-Zdrój dissolved.
  - Oder-Neisse line, entire Farther Pomerania placed first under Soviet, subsequently under Polish administration, since then remains as part of Poland
  - Apostolic Administration of Kamień, Lubusz and the Prelature of Piła is established in Gorzów Wielkopolski and takes over the responsibility for Catholics in Farther Pomerania, the region remains however formally a part of the Roman Catholic Diocese of Berlin

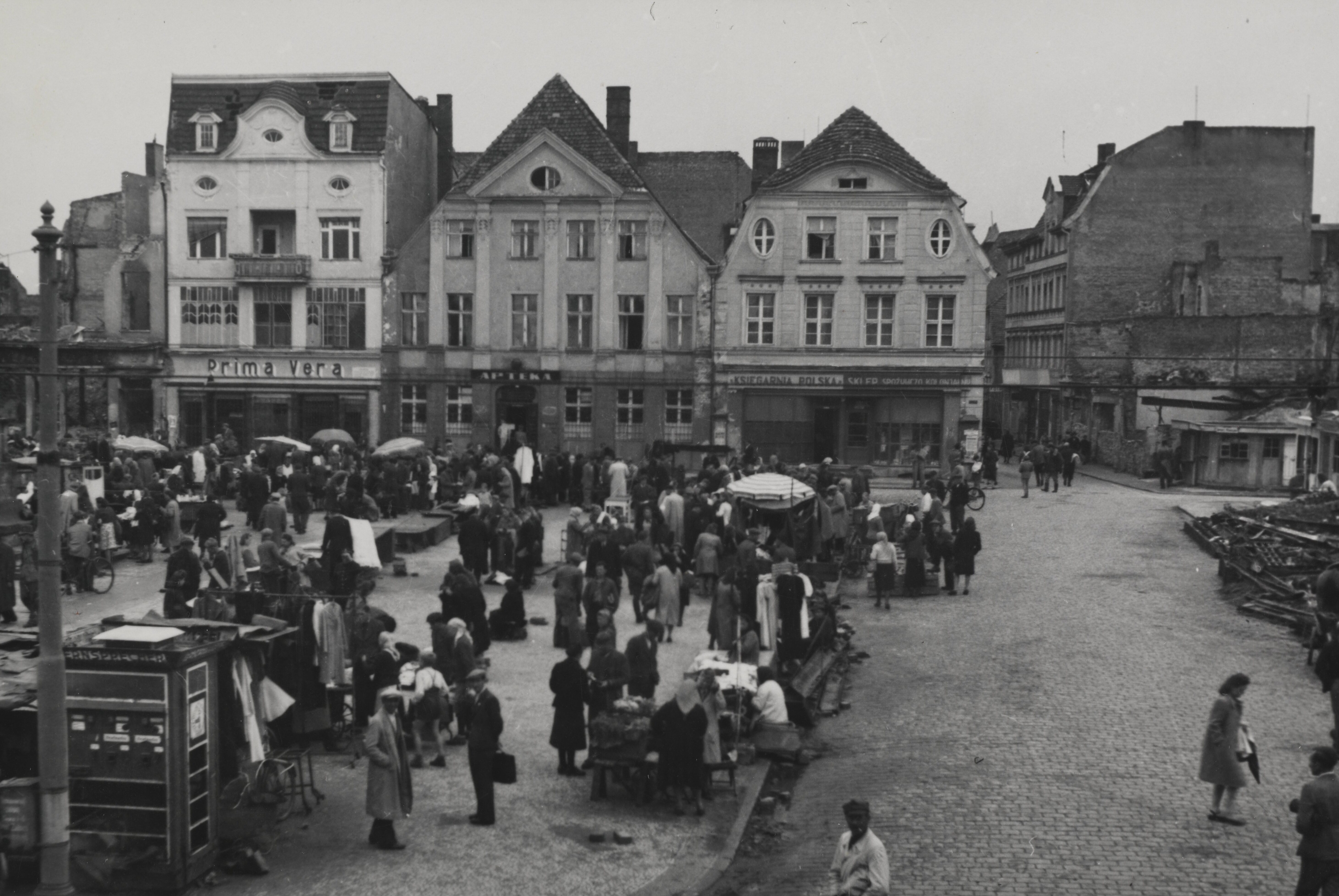
Słupsk market square in 1945

- 1945–1950 newly established Szczecin Voivodeship includes the entire Farther Pomerania, primarily Polish settlers replace the former German population
- 1950 Koszalin Voivodeship is carved out of the eastern part of Szczecin Voivodeship
- 1972 - papal bull Episcoporum Poloniae coetus following the Treaty of Warsaw - Apostolic Administration of Kamień, Lubusz and the Prelature of Piła is dissolved; Farther Pomerania is formally disentangled from the Diocese of Berlin and covered by the newly established Roman Catholic Archdiocese of Szczecin-Kamień and the Roman Catholic Diocese of Koszalin-Kołobrzeg, with minor easternmost parts integrated into the Roman Catholic Diocese of Chełmno
- 1975–1998 Farther Pomerania divided between Szczecin Voivodeship, Koszalin Voivodeship, and the newly established Słupsk Voivodeship
- 1980 Karlino oil eruption
- 1999, the region divided between the West Pomeranian (western two thirds) and Pomeranian (eastern one third) Voivodeships.

== Museums ==
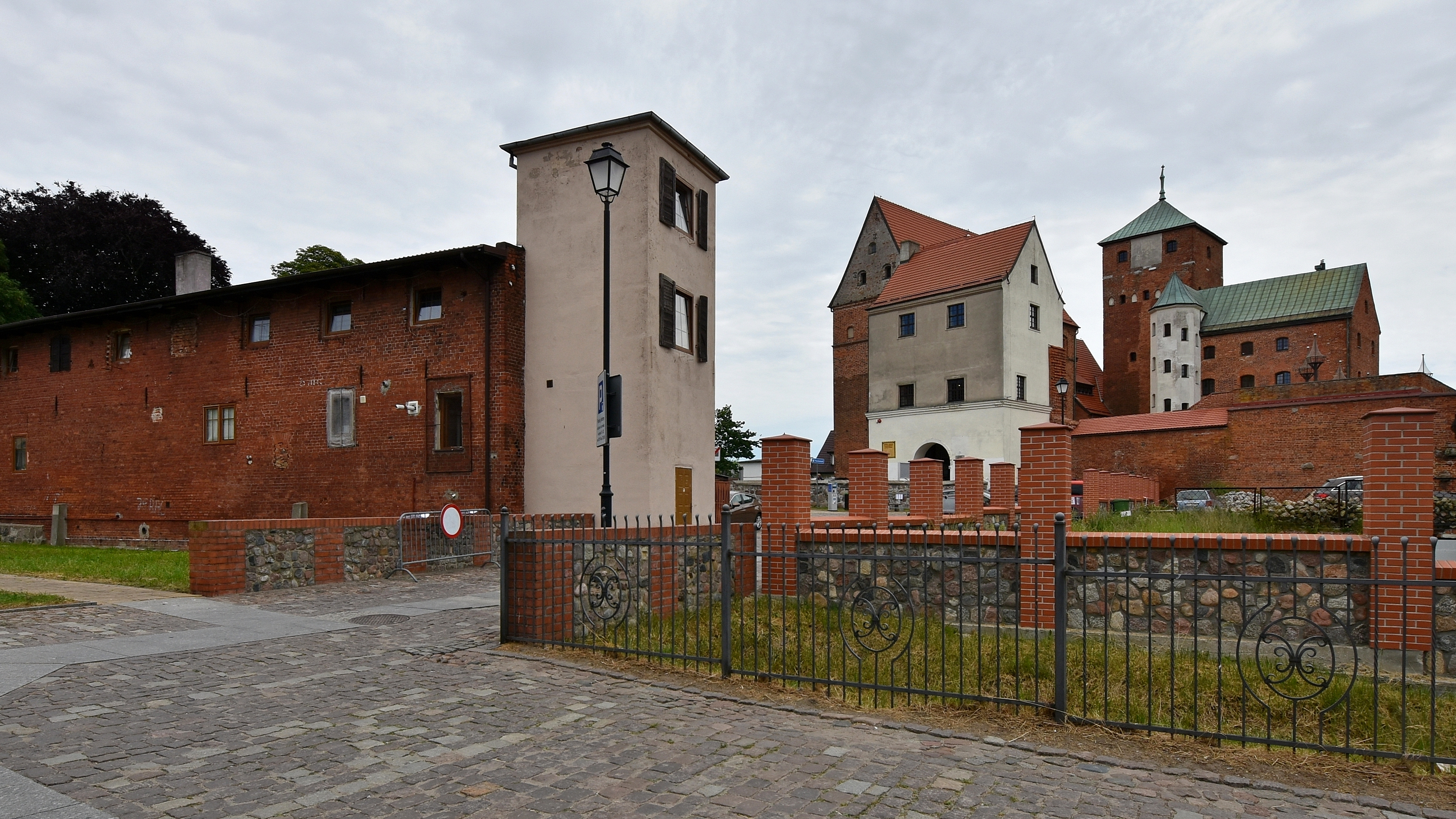
Medieval Darłowo Castle, now a museum

Main regional museums are the Museum of Central Pomerania (Muzeum Pomorza Środkowego) in Słupsk, the Archaeological and Historical Museum (Muzeum Archeologiczno-Historyczne) in Stargard, the Koszalin Museum (Muzeum w Koszalinie) and the Darłowo Museum (Muzeum w Darłowie). The Museum of Central Pomerania in Słupsk is located at the Ducal Castle and holds the world's biggest collection of paintings by Stanisław Ignacy Witkiewicz.

Perhaps more unusual museums include the Museum of Polish Arms (Muzeum Oręża Polskiego) in Kołobrzeg, which contains a collection of militaria related to the military of Poland from the Early Middle Ages to the present, and the Amber Museum (Muzeum Bursztynu) in Jarosławiec.

== Sports ==
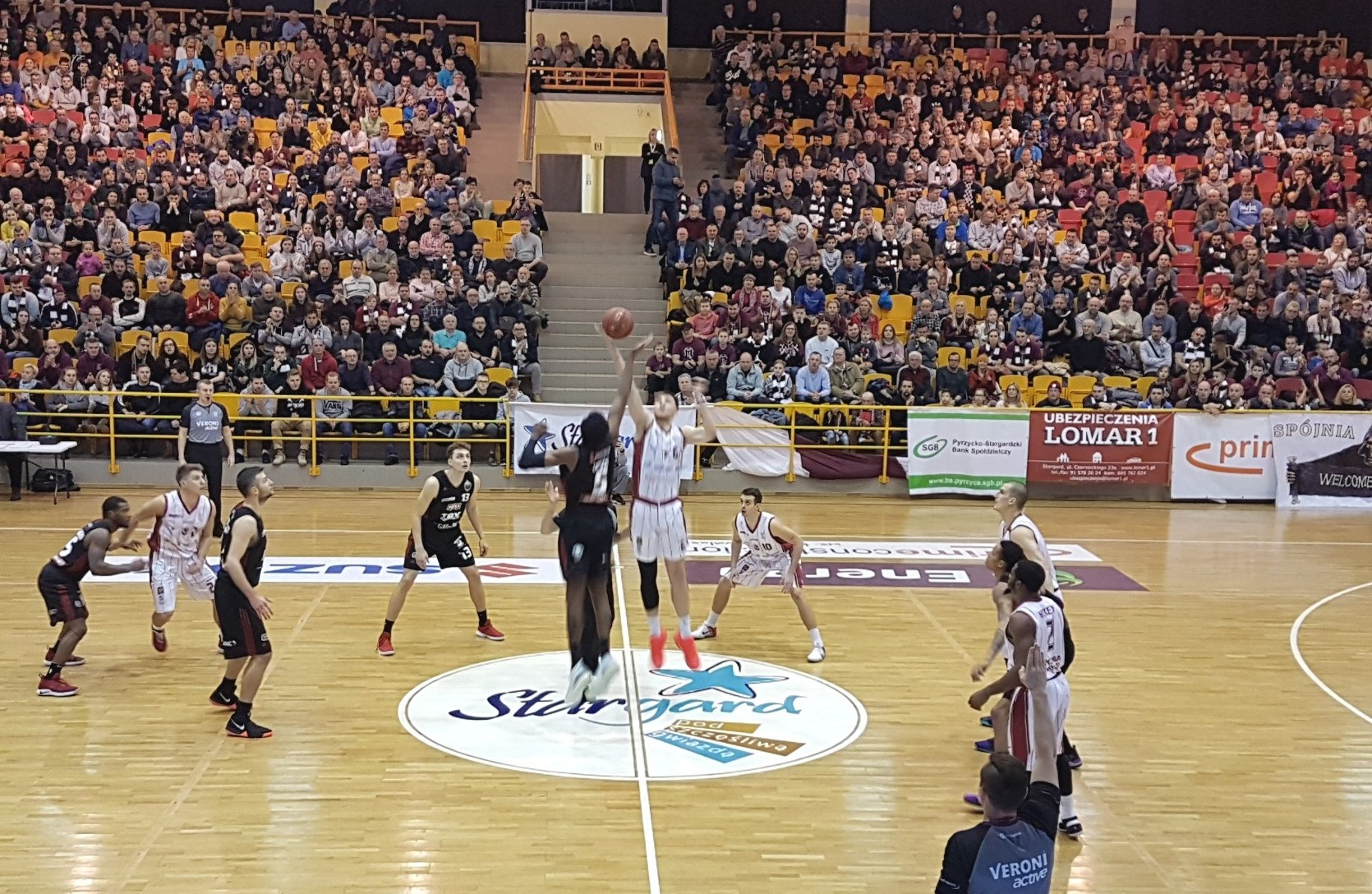
Home game of Spójnia Stargard with Start Lublin in the 2018–19 PLK season

Basketball is a particularly popular sport in Farther Pomerania, with several notable teams, i.e. Czarni Słupsk, Spójnia Stargard, AZS Koszalin and SKK Kotwica Kołobrzeg.

== See also ==
- List of towns in Farther Pomerania
- Pomerania
- Dukes of Pomerania
- House of Pomerania
- Pomerelia
