= Szczecin County =

Former county of Poland

- County of the District of the Western Pomerania and Szczecin Voivodeship
- 1946–1975
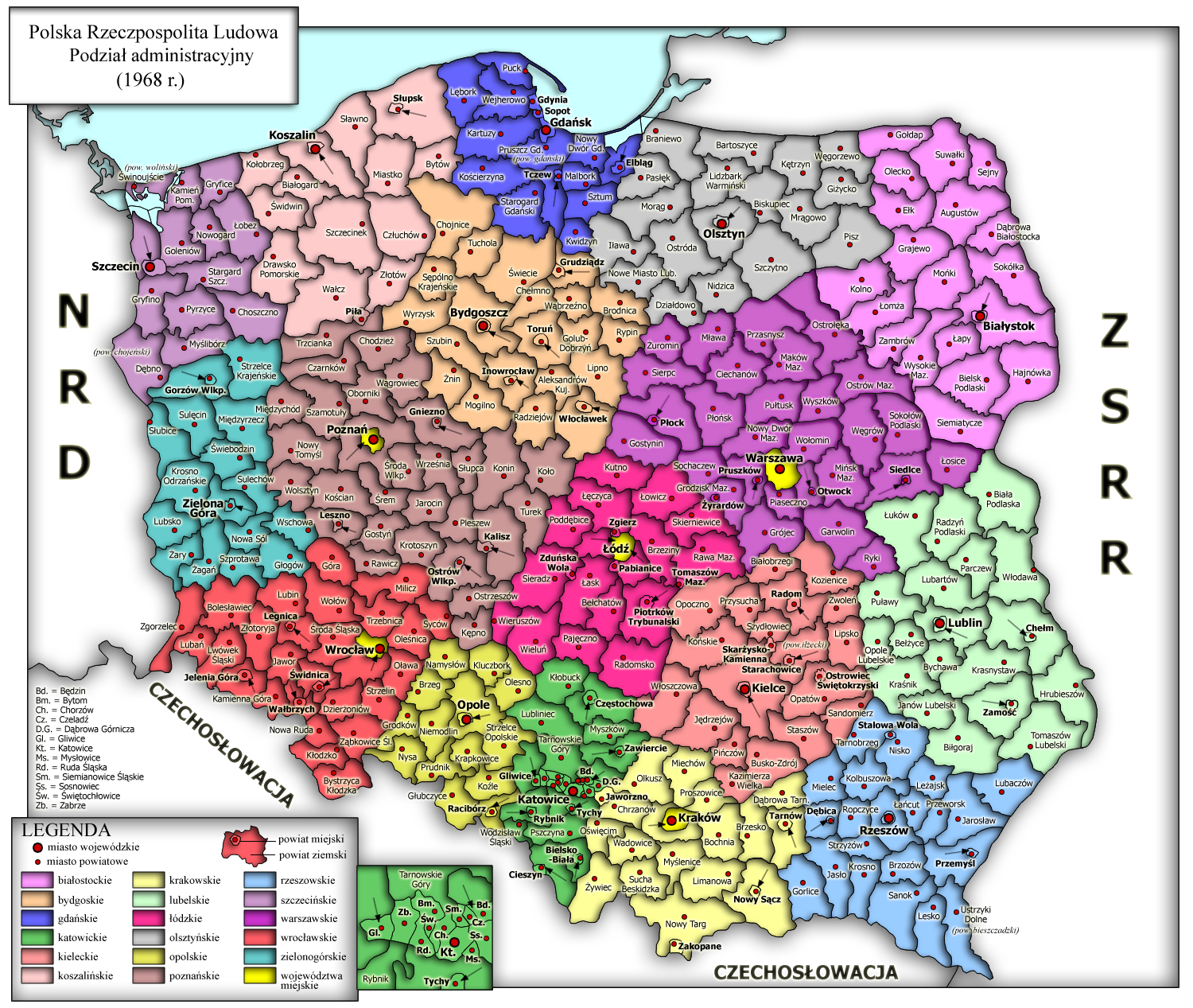
- Counties of Poland in 1968, including the Szczecin County.
- Capital: Szczecin (extrateritorially)
- Area
  - 1946: 402 km^{2} (155 sq mi)
- Population
  - 1946: 11 758
  - Type: County
- History
  - Established: 29 May 1946
  - Disestablished: 1 June 1975
- Contained within
  - Country: Provisional Government of National Unity (1946–1947); Polish People's Republic (1947–1975)
  - District: Western Pomerania (1946)
  - Voivodeship: Szczecin (1946–1975)
Preceded by
Veletian County
Randow District
Ueckermünde District
Succeeded by
Szczecin Voivodeship

The Szczecin County (Note: Polish: Powiat szczeciński) was a county centered around the town of Police, that existed from 1946 to 1975. In 1946 it was a subdivision of the District of the Western Pomerania, and from 1946 to 1975, of the Szczecin Voivodeship. Its seat of government was located extrateritorially in the nearby city of Szczecin.

== History ==
Szczecin County was established on 29 May 1946, and was located within the District of the Western Pomerania, that was under the administration of the Provisional Government of National Unity. It was formed from the former districts of Randow and Ueckermünde that belonged to the Nazi Germany, and the Veletian County. The District of the Western Pomerania was disestablished on 28 June 1946, and replaced by the Szczecin Voivodeship. In 1946, it had 11 758 inhabitants, and an area of 402 km².

It remained under the control of the Provisional Government until 19 February 1947, when the Polish People's Republic was established in its place. The county existed until 1 June 1975, when it was abolished due to the new administrative reform, with its territory being incorporated into then-established Szczecin Voivodeship. Its capital was Szczecin, which itself wasn't part of the county, and existed as the separate city county instead. The city was chosen as the seat for the county, due to the existence the Enclave of Police from 1945 to 1946, which slowed the development of the town of Police, that would otherwise had been chosen for the seat instead. In 1999, Police County was established within the same borders as the former Szczecin County.
