= Koszalin Voivodeship =

Koszalin Voivodeship may also refer to:

- Koszalin Voivodeship (1950–1975)
- Koszalin Voivodeship (1975–1998)
