= Gmina Międzyzdroje =

- Gmina
- Coat of arms
- Interactive map of Gmina Międzyzdroje
- Coordinates (Międzyzdroje): 53°55′37″N 14°27′2″E
- Country: Poland
- Voivodeship: West Pomeranian
- County: Kamień
- Seat: Międzyzdroje

Area
  - Total: 117.17 km^{2} (45.24 sq mi)

Population (2006)
  - Total: 6,477
  - Density: 55.28/km^{2} (143.2/sq mi)
  - Urban: 5,436
  - Rural: 1,041
- Website: http://www.miedzyzdroje.pl/

Gmina Międzyzdroje is an urban and rural municipality in Kamień County within the West Pomeranian Voivodeship in north-western Poland. Its seat is the town of Międzyzdroje. The municipality covers an area of 117.17 square kilometres (45.2 sq mi), and as of 2006 its total population is 6,477 (out of which the population of Międzyzdroje amounts to 5,436, and the population of its rural part of is 1,041).

== Villages ==
Apart from the town of Międzyzdroje, Gmina Międzyzdroje contains the villages and settlements of Grodno, Lubin, Trzciągowo, Wapnica, Wicko and Zalesie.

== Neighbouring gminas ==
Gmina Międzyzdroje is bordered by the city of Świnoujście and by the gminas of Stepnica and Wolin.
