= Trzciągowo =

- Village
- Location within Poland
- Coordinates: 53°52′46.2″N 14°27′43.2″E
- Country: Poland
- Voivodeship: West Pomeranian
- County: Kamień
- Gmina: Międzyzdroje

Trzciągowo [tʂt͡ɕɔnˈɡɔvɔ] (German: Stengow) is a village in the administrative district of Gmina Międzyzdroje, within Kamień County, West Pomeranian Voivodeship, in north-western Poland. It lies approximately 7 km (4 mi) south of Międzyzdroje, 25 km (16 mi) south-west of Kamień Pomorski, and 51 km (32 mi) north of the regional capital Szczecin.
