= Zalesie, Kamień County =

Zalesie
- Village
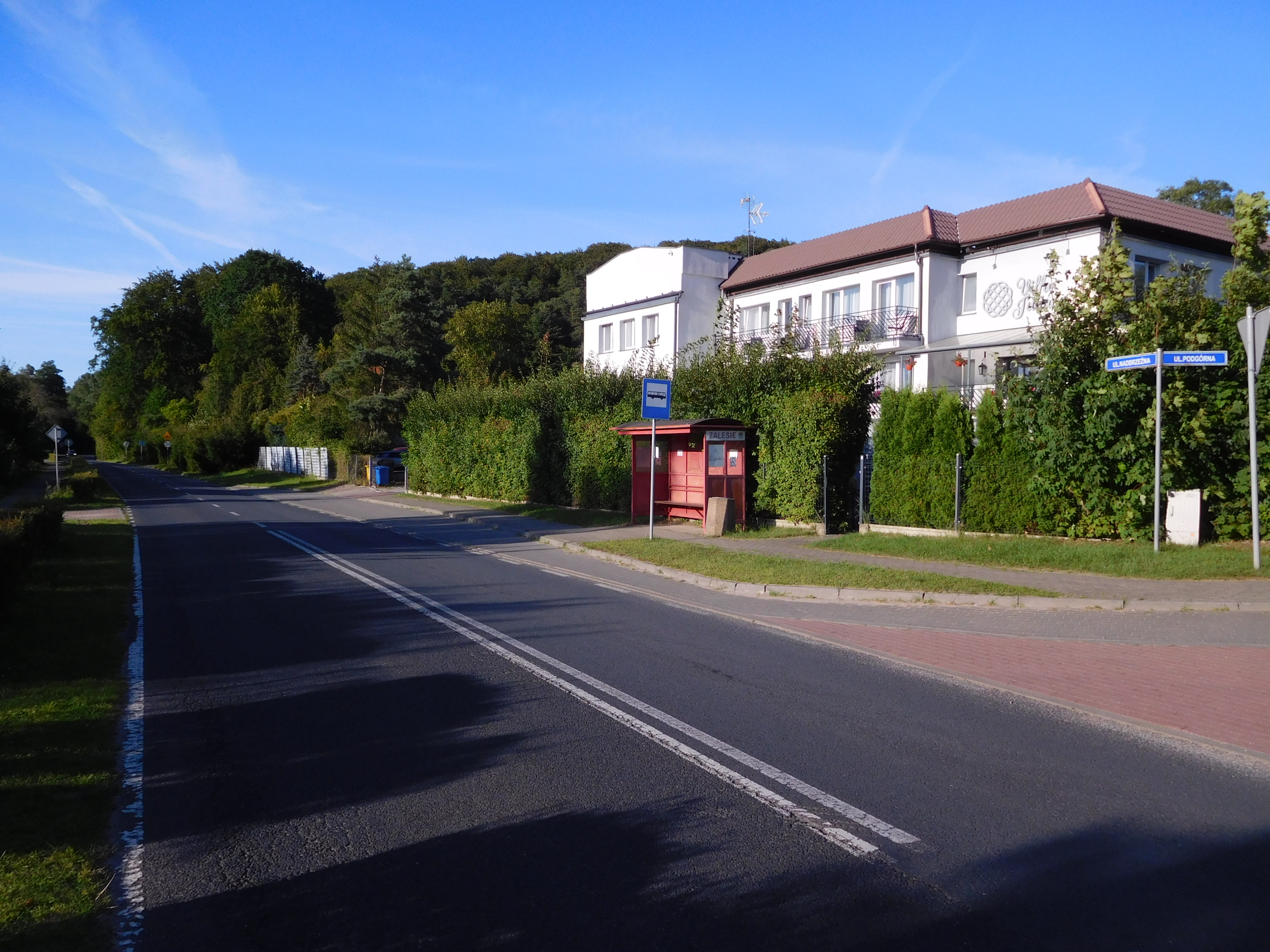

- Location within Poland
- Coordinates: 53°53′53″N 14°26′8″E
- Country: Poland
- Voivodeship: West Pomeranian
- County: Kamień
- Gmina: Międzyzdroje
- Time zone: UTC+1 (CET)
  - Summer (DST): UTC+2 (CEST)
- Vehicle registration: ZKA

Zalesie ([zaˈlɛɕɛ]; German: Laatzig) is a village in the administrative district of Gmina Międzyzdroje, within Kamień County, West Pomeranian Voivodeship, in north-western Poland. It lies approximately 4 km (2 mi) south of Międzyzdroje, 25 km (16 mi) west of Kamień Pomorski, and 55 km (34 mi) north of the regional capital Szczecin.
