= Eric Spiegel =

German politician (1919–1984)

Administrator of the Randow District
- In office 5 July 1945 – August 1945

Deputy mayor of Szczecin
- In office 26 May 1945 – 5 July 1945

Administrator of Greater Szczecin
- In office 26 May 1945 – 5 July 1945

High mayor of the 4th district of Szczecin
- In office 2 May 1945 – 26 May 1945
- Preceded by: Werner Faber (as high mayor of Szczecin)
- Succeeded by: Erich Wiesner

Personal details
- Born: 15 October 1919 Goleniów, Free State of Prussia, Germany (now part of Poland)
- Died: 15 September 1984 (aged 65) Moscow, Russian SSR, Soviet Union (now part of Russia)

Eric Spiegel (German: [ˈeːʁɪk ˈʃpiːɡl̩]; 15 October 1919 – 15 September 1984) was a German government official. From 2 May to 26 May 1945, he briefly served as the high mayor of German district of the Soviet-occupied city of Szczecin.

== Biography ==
Erich Spiegel was born on 15 October 1919 in Goleniów, then located within the Province of Pomerania, Free State of Prussia, Germany, and now within the West Pomeranian Voivodeship, Poland. He grew up in nearby Szczecin.

After graduating school, he became a surveyor in 1936. In 1941, during the Second World War, he was drafted into Wehrmacht forces of Nazi Germany. In 1944 he became a prisoner of war of the Soviet Union. While reminding captive, he joined the National Committee for a Free Germany.

He was taken to Szczecin, after the Red Army has captured the city on 26 April 1945. There, on 2 May 1945, he was installed as the high mayor of the German district of the occupied city, known as Zabelsdorf, and designed as the 4th district. The remaining districts of the city were placed under control of Polish administration with mayor Piotr Zaremba. Both mayors were under the command of general of the Red Army, Aleksandr Fedotov, who administered the military occupation of the city. Spiegel was soon replaced with Erich Wiesner, who became the high mayor on 26 May 1945.

Spiegel became the deputy mayor of Szczecin. He also received the title of the District Administrator of Greater Stettin, administering the area surrounding the city, to the west of Oder river. His office was originally located in Szczecin; however, after the city was fully handed over to Polish administration, on 5 July 1945, it was moved to Hohenholz in the Soviet occupation zone in Germany. He then became administrator of the Randow District in Germany. Under his jurisdiction was also the Enclave of Police, an enclave in Poland, still under control of the Red Army. He remained in that office until August 1945, when he began overseeing the resettlement of German population from Poland to the State of Mecklenburg, Germany.

From November 1945 to 1978, Spiegel held various leading positions in the construction industry in the Soviet occupation zone, later East Germany.

He died on 15 September 1984, while travelling in Moscow, Russian SSR, Soviet Union (now part of Russia).
