= Police Enclave =

Area of Police, Western Pomerania, Poland

- 1945–1946
- Status: Military occupation of the Soviet Union, administered as part of the Randow District, Soviet occupation zone in Germany
- Capital: Hohenholz (extraterritorial)
- Common languages: Russian, German
- Historical era: Cold War
  - Established: 1945
  - Disestablished: 1946
Preceded by	Succeeded by
Greater Stettin	Szczecin County
- Today part of: Poland

Police Enclave (Note: Polish: Enklawa Policka; Russian: Полицкий анклав, transcription: Politskiy anklav; German: Pölitz-Enklave) was an area centered on the town of Police, in the District of the Western Pomerania, Poland, that was administrared as an exclave of the Randow District in the Soviet occupation zone in Germany. It existed from 5 October 1945 to 25 September 1946. It was independent of Polish administration, but remained within its territory.

== History ==
The enclave was established on 5 October 1945 by the Red Army from part of the former Greater Stettin district, located in Poland as an area independent of Polish administration. It was formed to secure and move to the Soviet Union the machines and resources of the Hydrierwerke Pölitz AG factory that produced liquid hydrocarbons from coal. The area was administrared as part of the Randow District in the Soviet occupation zone in Germany, though legally outside of its borders. The district administor was Eric Spiegel. Their seat was located in Hohenholz, in the Soviet zone. Over 20,000 workers and prisoners of war from Germany had worked in the area. Poles were not allowed to settle in the enclave.

The Enclave of Police was divided into 2 zones: A and B. Zone A stretched from the south of Police to Stołczyn and existed until 19 July 1946. Zone B stretched from the north of Police to Trzebież and existed up to 25 September 1946. It was around 90 km^{2} (35 square miles) at its largest.

The enclave was abolished on 25 September 1946, with its territories being returned to Polish administration.
