= Landkreis Stolp =

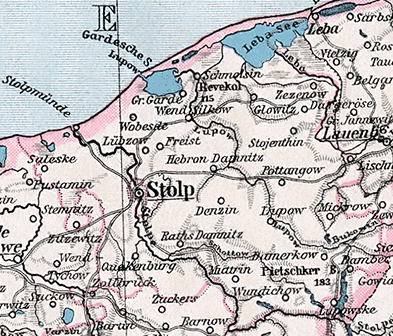
Das Kreisgebiet 1905

The Landkreis Stolp (Stolp [rural] district; 1648 to 1898: Kreis Stolp) was a Brandenburg-Prussian district in Farther Pomerania formed in 1648 from the Landvogtei Stolp (Stolp land advocacy). It weathered the alterations of the Farther Pomeranian district borders in 1724 unchanged. In 1815, with the introduction of government regions, Stolp District became part of the new Köslin Region in the enlarged Province of Pomerania in Prussia, part of the German Federation (1815-1866), North German Confederation (1867-1871) and the united Germany of 1871.

In 1876 the district ceded a number of exclaves to neighbouring districts and received enclaves within its district area from the Rummelsburg and Schlawe districts. In 1898 the city of Stolp was disentangled from the district, becoming an urban district of its own and a new enclave amidst the rural district. However, Stolp rural district maintained its district offices in that town. On 1 January 1945 the rural district comprised 193 municipalities around the city of Stolp (renamed in Polish as Slupsk in 1945). With the Soviet conquest of Farther Pomerania in March 1945 the district ceased to exist.

== Demographics ==
In 1905, the district had a population of 76,478, of which 75,875 (99.21%) spoke German, 547 (0.72%) spoke Polish (Kashubian), 12 (0.02%) were bilingual and the remainder spoke other languages.

== Literature ==
- Karl-Heinz Pagel: Der Landkreis Stolp in Pommern. Lübeck 1989 (in German, online)
- Karl-Heinz Pagel: Stolp in Pommern - eine ostdeutsche Stadt. Lübeck 1977 (in German, online)
