= Koszalin Voivodeship (1975–1998) =

Former voivodeship of Poland

- Voivodeship of the Polish People's Republic and Third Republic of Poland
- 1975–1998
- The administrative subdivisions of Poland from 1975 to 1998, including the Koszalin Voivodeship.
- Capital: Koszalin
- Area
  - 1998: 8,470 km^{2} (3,270 sq mi)
- Population
  - 1975: 434 800
  - 1997: 527 600
- Government
  - Type: Voivodeship
- Voivode
  - 1975–1981 (first): Jan Urbanowicz
  - 1998 (last): Grażyna Sztark
- History
  - Established: 1 June 1975
  - Disestablished: 31 December 1998
- Contained within
  - Country: Polish People's Republic (1975–1989); Third Republic of Poland (1989–1998)
- Political subdivisions: 41 gminas (1997)
Preceded by	Succeeded by
Koszalin Voivodeship	West Pomeranian Voivodeship

The Koszalin Voivodeship (Note: Polish: Województwo koszalińskie) was a voivodeship (province) of the Polish People's Republic from 1975 to 1989, and the Third Republic of Poland from 1989 to 1998. Its capital was Koszalin, and it was centered on the eastern Farther Pomerania. It was established on 1 June 1975, from the part of the Koszalin Voivodeship, and existed until 31 December 1998, when it was incorporated into then-established West Pomeranian Voivodeship.

== History ==
The Szczecin Voivodeship was established on 1 June 1975, as part of the administrative reform, and was one of the voivodeships (provinces) of the Polish People's Republic. It was formed from the part of the territory of the Koszalin Voivodeship. Its capital was located in the city of Koszalin. In 1975, it was inhabited by 434 800 people.

On 9 December 1989, the Polish People's Republic was replaced by the Third Republic of Poland. In 1997, the voivodeship had a population of 527 600, and in 1998, it had an area of 8470 km^{2}. It existed until 31 December 1998, when it was incorporated into then-established West Pomeranian Voivodeship.

== Subdivisions ==
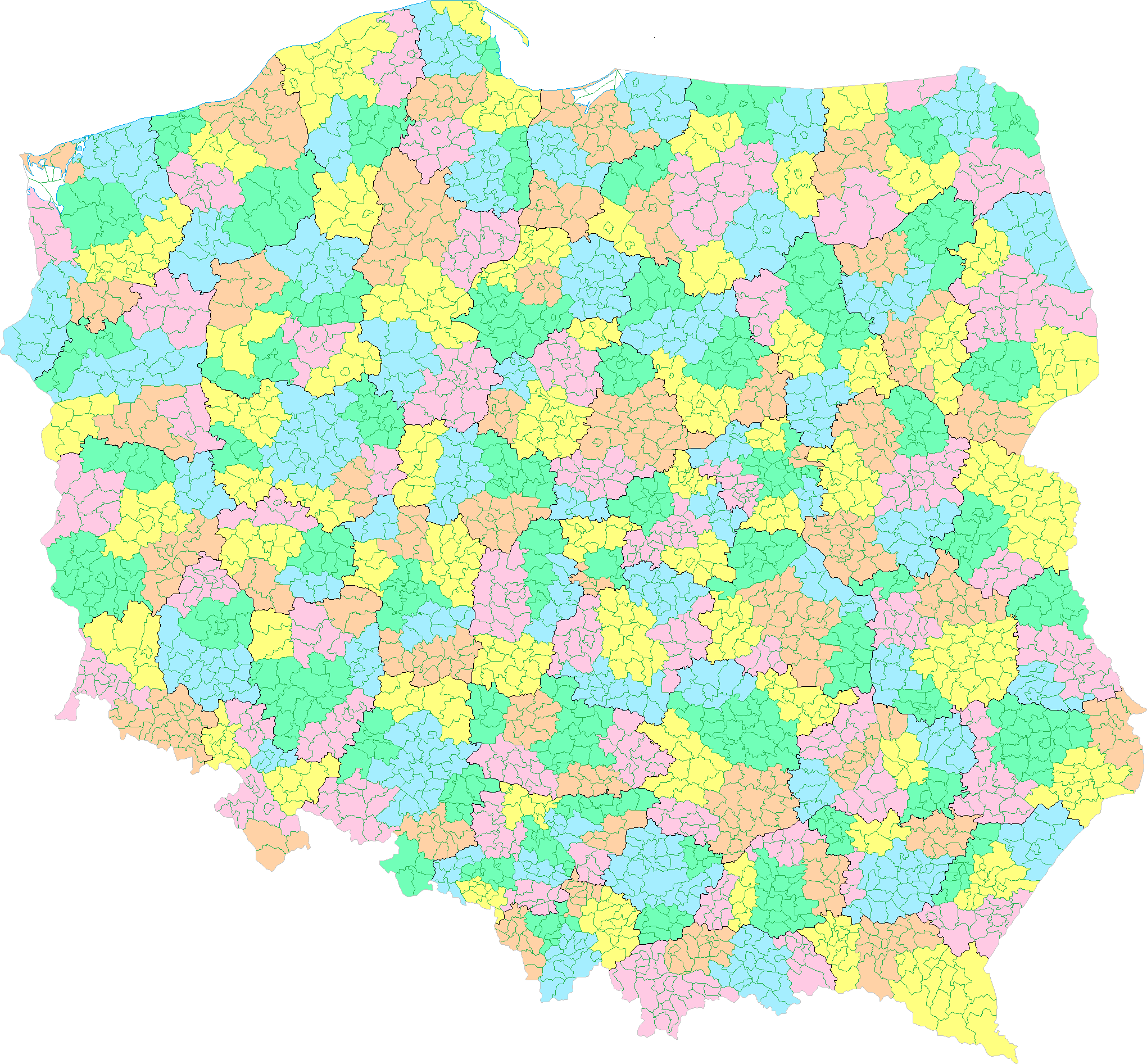
The district offices and gminas (municipalities) of Poland in 1998, including the Koszalin Voivodeship.

In 1997, the voivodeship was divided into 41 gminas (municipalities), including 6 urban municipalities, 12 urban-rural municipalities, and 23 rural municipalities. It had 18 towns and cities. In 1998, it had an area of 9982 km^{2}.

From 1990 to 1998, it was additionally divided into six district offices, each comprising several municipalities.

== Demographics ==
Year	Population
1975	434 800
1980	462 200
1985	489 800
1990	508 200
1995	521 900
1997	527 600

== Leaders ==
The leader of the administrative division was the voivode. Those were:

- 1975–1981: Jan Urbanowicz
- 1981–1986: Zdzisław Mazurkiewicz
- 1986–1990: Jacek Czayka
- 1990–1993: Stanisław Socha
- 1994–1997: Jerzy Mokrzycki
- 1998: Grażyna Sztark
