= Wapnica, Kamień County =

Wapnica
- Village
- Location within Poland
- Coordinates: 53°52′48″N 14°26′06″E
- Country: Poland
- Voivodeship: West Pomeranian
- County: Kamień
- Gmina: Międzyzdroje
- Population: 350

Wapnica [vapˈnit͡sa] (German: Kalkofen) is a village in the administrative district of Gmina Międzyzdroje, within Kamień County, West Pomeranian Voivodeship, in north-western Poland. It lies approximately 6 km (4 mi) south of Międzyzdroje, 25 km (16 mi) south-west of Kamień Pomorski, and 53 km (33 mi) north of the regional capital Szczecin.

The village has a population of 350.

== See also ==
History of Pomerania
