= Grodno, West Pomeranian Voivodeship =

Grodno
- Location within Poland
- Coordinates: 53°58′04″N 14°32′02″E
- Country: Poland
- Voivodeship: West Pomeranian
- County: Kamień
- Gmina: Międzyzdroje
- Population: 22

Grodno [ˈɡrɔdnɔ] (1947-2010: Jaromin; German: Jordansee) is a coastal place on the island of Wolin, in the administrative district of Gmina Międzyzdroje, within Kamień County, West Pomeranian Voivodeship, in north-western Poland. It lies approximately 7 km (4 mi) north-east of Międzyzdroje, 17 km (11 mi) west of Kamień Pomorski, and 62 km (39 mi) north of the regional capital Szczecin.

There are two vacation centres at Grodno, Grodno I (formerly a vacation centre for the Polish government, given to the Wolin National Park on 10 February 2009), and Grodno II, a vacation centre within the National Park with its own beach.

To the south-east of Grodno is Gardno Lake.

== See also ==
History of Pomerania
