= Lubin, Kamień County =

Lubin
- Village
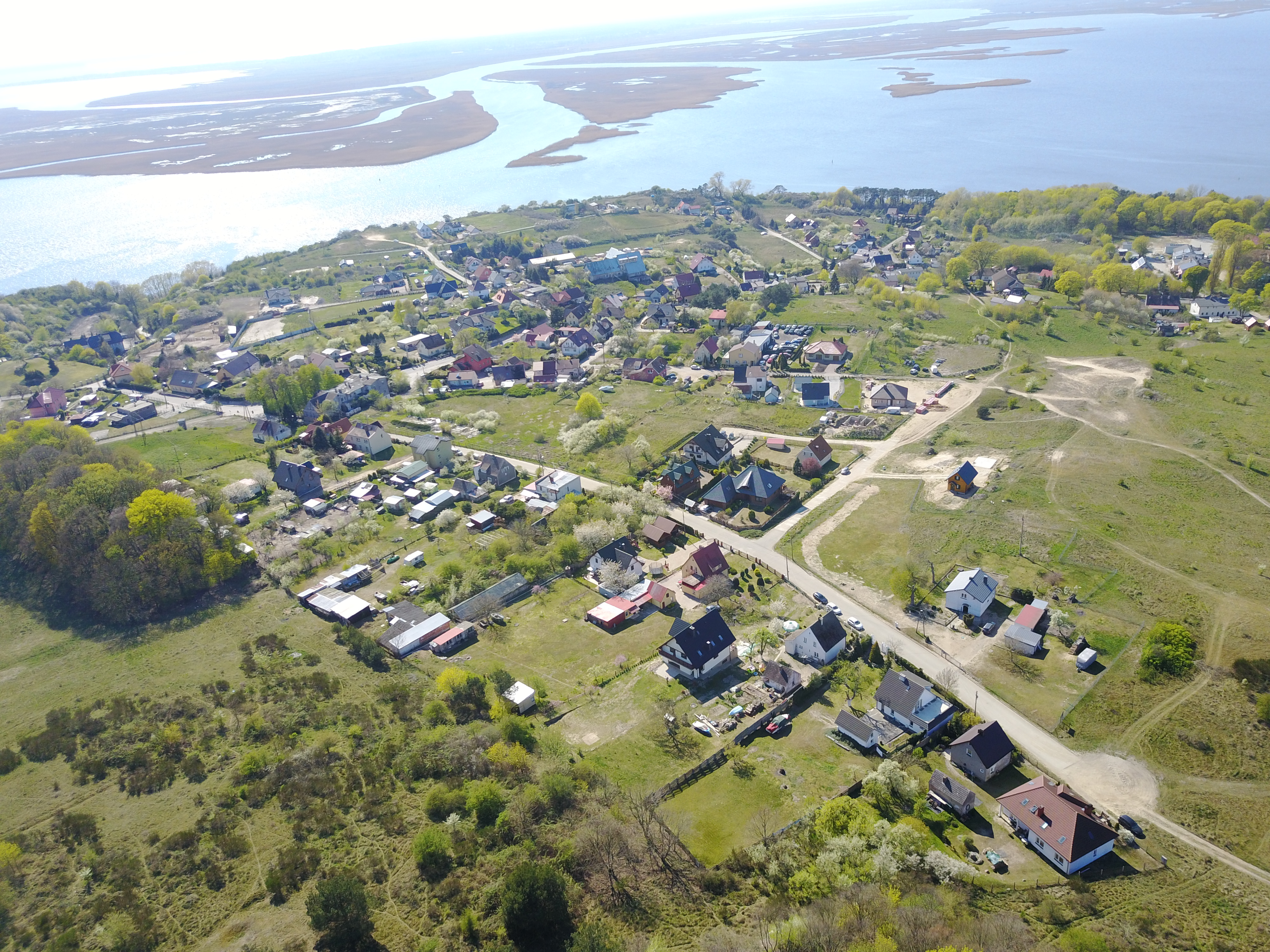
- Aerial view of Lubin

- Location within Poland
- Coordinates: 53°52′6″N 14°25′53″E
- Country: Poland
- Voivodeship: West Pomeranian
- County: Kamień
- Gmina: Międzyzdroje

Population
  - Total: 340
- Time zone: UTC+1 (CET)
  - Summer (DST): UTC+2 (CEST)
- Vehicle registration: ZKA

Lubin (Polish: [ˈlubin]; German: Lebbin) is a village on the Wolin island in the administrative district of Gmina Międzyzdroje, within Kamień County, West Pomeranian Voivodeship, in north-western Poland. It lies approximately 7 km (4 mi) south of Międzyzdroje, 26 km (16 mi) south-west of Kamień Pomorski, and 52 km (32 mi) north of the regional capital Szczecin.

The village has a population of 340.

There is a medieval stronghold and viewing point in Lubin.
