= Koszalin Voivodeship (1950–1975) =

Former voivodeship of Poland

- Voivodeship of Poland
- 1950–1975
- The Koszalin Voivodeship within Poland, between 1950 and 1975.
- Capital: Koszalin
- Area
  - 1956: 17,914 km^{2} (6,917 sq mi)
  - 1974: 18,104 km^{2} (6,990 sq mi)
- Population
  - 1950: 518 354
  - 1974: 837 000
  - Type: Voivodeship
- History
  - Established: 6 July 1950
  - Disestablished: 31 May 1975
- Contained within
  - Country: Polish People's Republic
Preceded by
Szczecin Voivodeship
Succeeded by
Koszalin Voivodeship
Słupsk Voivodeship
Piła Voivodeship

The Koszalin Voivodeship (Note: Polish: Województwo koszalińskie) was a voivodeship (province) of the Polish People's Republic, with capital in Koszalin, that existed from 1950 to 1975. It was established on 6 July 1950, from the eastern half of the Szczecin Voivodeship, and existed until 31 May 1975, when it was partitioned between then-established voivodeships of Koszalin, Słupsk, and Piła.

== History ==
The Koszalin Voivodeship was established on 6 July 1950, as one of the voivodeships (provinces) of the Polish People's Republic. It was formed from the eastern half of the Szczecin Voivodeship. It included the counties of Białogard, Bytów, Człuchów, Drawsko, Kołobrzeg, Koszalin, Miastko, Sławno, Słupsk, Szczecinek, Wałcz, and Złotów, and the city county of Słupsk. Additionally on that day, the capital on then-established voivodeship, Koszalin, became the city county. In 1950, it was inhabited by 518 354 people, and in 1956, it had an area of 17 914 km^{2}.

On 1 October 1954 was established the Świdwin County, from parts of the counties of Białogard, and Kołobrzeg. In 1974, it had an area of 18 104 km^{2}, and was inhabited by 837 000 people.

The voivodeship existed until 31 May 1975, when it was partitioned between then-established voivodeships of Koszalin, Słupsk, and Piła.

== Subdivisions ==
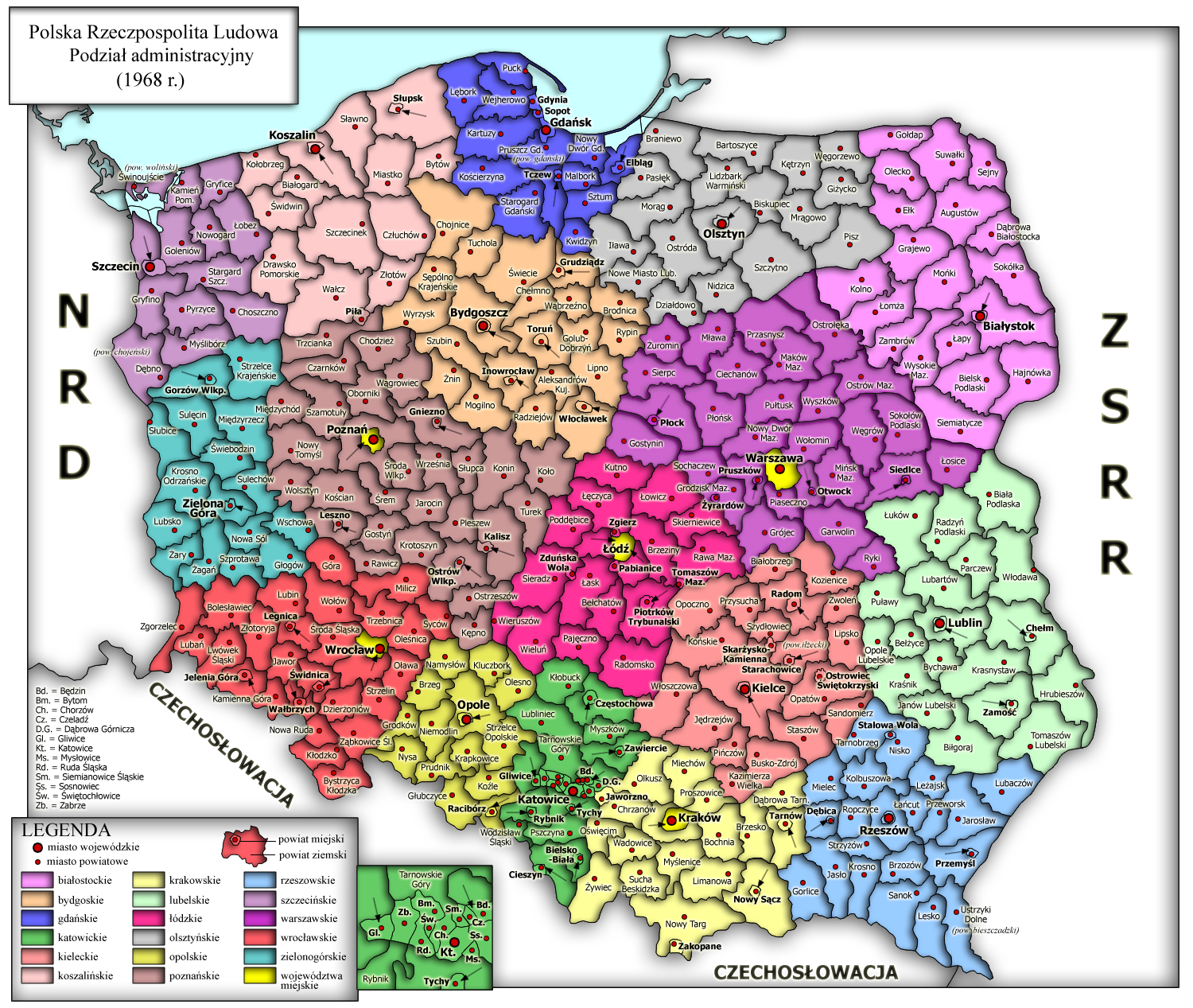
The counties of Poland in 1968, including the counties of the Koszalin Voivodeship.

The voivodeship was divided into counties: Those were:

- Białogard County (seat: Białogard);
- Bytów County (seat: Bytów);
- Choszczno County (seat: Choszczno);
- Człuchów County (seat: Człuchów);
- Drawsko County (seat: Drawsko Pomorskie);
- Kołobrzeg County (seat: Kołobrzeg);
- Koszalin (city county);
- Koszalin County (seat: Koszalin);
- Miastko County (seat: Miastko);
- Sławno County (seat: Sławno);
- Słupsk (city county);
- Słupsk County (seat: Słupsk);
- Świdwin County (seat: Świdwin; 1954–1975);
- Szczecinek County (seat: Szczecinek);
- Wałcz County (seat: Wałcz);
- Złotów County (seat: Złotów).

== Demographics ==
Year	Population		
Year	Total	Urban (%)	Rural (%)
1950	518 354	176 722 (34.09%)	341 632 (65.91%)
1956	648 000	263 000 (40.5%)	385 000 (59.5%)
1960	687 915	306 967 (44.62%)	380 948 (55.38%)
1963	730 000	337 000 (46.2%)	393 000 (53.8%)
1965	755 100	no data	no data
1970	795 392	393 787 (49.51%)	401 605 (50.49%)
1971	803 200	401 900 (50%)	401 300 (50%)
1972	815 400	409 700 (50.2%)	405 700 (49.8%)
1973	826 000	423 000 (51.2%)	403 000 (48.8%)
1974	837 000	433 000 (51.7%)	404 000 (48.%)

== Leaders ==
From 1950, to 1973, the leader of the voivodeship was the chairperson of the Voivodeship National Council. In 1973 was established the office of the voivode, however it remained vacant until the disestablishment of the voivodeship in 1975.

The people in the office of the chairperson of the Voivodeship National Council, from 1950 to 1973, were:

- 11 July 1950 – 25 May 1951: Henryk Kołodziejczyk;
- 25 May 1951 – 26 July 1953: Jan Musiał;
- 27 July 1953 – 21 April 1955: Józef Szczęśniak;
- 22 April 1955 – 14 March 1956: Franciszek Grochalski;
- 15 March 1956 – 11 December 1957: Jan Kawiak;
- 12 November 1957 – 26 July 1966: Zdzisław Tomal;
- 26 July 1966 – 19 September 1968: Tadeusz Makowski;
- 20 September 1968 – 24 November 1972: Wacław Gelger;
- 25 November 1972 – 24 November 1973: Stanisław Mach.
