= Wicko, West Pomeranian Voivodeship =

Wicko
- Village
- Location within Poland
- Coordinates: 53°53′23″N 14°26′19″E
- Country: Poland
- Voivodeship: West Pomeranian
- County: Kamień
- Gmina: Międzyzdroje
- Postal code: 72-500

Wicko [ˈvit͡skɔ] (German: Vietzig) is a village in the administrative district of Gmina Międzyzdroje, within Kamień County, West Pomeranian Voivodeship, in north-western Poland. It lies approximately 5 km (3 mi) south of Międzyzdroje, 25 km (16 mi) west of Kamień Pomorski, and 54 km (34 mi) north of the regional capital Szczecin.
