= District of Western Pomerania =

Former district of Poland

- District of Poland
- 1945–1946
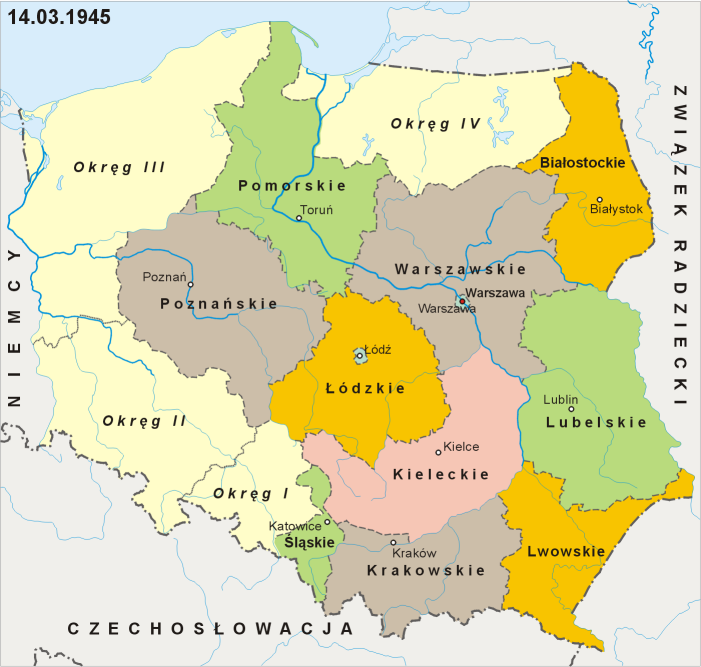
- The administrative subdivisions of Poland in 1945, including the District of Western Pomerania
- Capital: Piła (April 1945 – 7 May 1945); Szczecin (8 May 1945 – 16 May 1945; 28 February 1946 – 28 June 1946); Stargard (17 May 1945 – 23 May 1945); Koszalin (24 May 1945 – 27 February 1946)
- Government
  - Type: District
- Government Plenipotentiary
  - 1945 (first): Józef Aleksander Kaczocha
  - 1945–1946 (last): Leonard Borkowicz
- History
  - Established: 14 March 1945
  - Disestablished: 28 June 1946
- Contained within
  - Country: Provisional Government of the Republic of Poland (1945); Provisional Government of National Unity (1945–1946)
Preceded by
Province of Pomerania
Province of Brandenburg
Succeeded by
Szczecin Voivodeship
Poznań Voivodeship
Pomeranian Voivodeship

The District of Western Pomerania, (Note: Polish: Okręg Pomorze Zachodnie) also designated as the 3rd District, (Note: Polish: Okręg III) was a district of Poland, during the administration of the Provisional Government of the Republic of Poland in 1945, and the Provisional Government of National Unity from 1945 to 1946. It was established as one of four districts on 14 March 1945, as one of the four districts created to administer the area known as the Recovered Territories, acquired by Poland from Nazi Germany, during, and in the aftermath of World War 2. It was formed within the boundaries of former German provinces of Brandenburg, and Pomerania, and consisted of the area of the Farther Pomerania and Lubusz Land. On 25 September 1945, its southern part was incorporated into the Poznań Voivodeship. It existed until 28 June 1946, when it was abolished and incorporated into the Szczecin Voivodeship.

== History ==
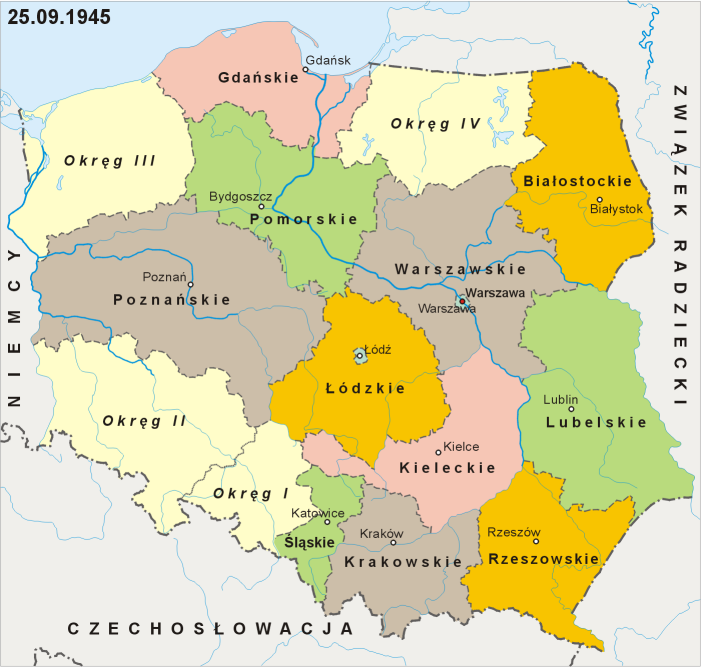
The administrative subdivisions of Poland from 25 September to 24 June 1945, including the District of Western Pomerania.

The District of the Western Pomerania was established on 14 March 1945, by the Provisional Government of the Republic of Poland, as one of the four districts created to administer the area known as the Recovered Territories, acquired by Poland from Nazi Germany, during, and in the aftermath of World War 2. It was formed within the boundaries of former German provinces of Brandenburg, and Pomerania, and consisted of the area of the Farther Pomerania and Lubusz Land. The district was administrated by the Office of the Government Plenipotentiary of the District of the Western Pomerania, with the Government Plenipotentiary as the head of the subdivision, and the officers of the Ministry of Public Security, as their deputies. The first Government Plenipotentiary was Józef Aleksander Kaczocha, who was appointed on 14 March 1945, and originally began assembling his government in Warsaw, and Poznań. On 11 April 1945, Kaczocha was replaced by Leonard Borkowicz.

The districts officials had arrived in the district in April of 1945, and established the seat of the government in Piła. On 7 May 1945, the seat was moved to Szczecin. As the future status of the city allegiance between Poland and Germany remained uncertain, the seat was moved again, on 17 May 1945, to Stargard, where it remained until 23 May 1945. On 24 May 1945, it was transferred to Koszalin. On 15 January 1946, the government begun transferring the seat back to Szczecin, and it was fully moved, on 28 February 1946.

On 28 June 1945, the Provisional Government of the Republic of Poland had been replaced by the Provisional Government of National Unity. On 7 July 1945, the counties of Człuchów, and Złotów, were transferred to the Pomeranian Voivodeship. On 25 September 1945, its southern part was incorporated into the Poznań Voivodeship. The district existed until 28 June 1946, when it was abolished and incorporated into then-established Szczecin Voivodeship.

== Leaders ==
The head of the district held the office of the Government Plenipotentiary. They were:

- 14 May 1945 – 11 April 1945: Józef Aleksander Kaczocha;
- 11 April 1945 – 28 June 1946: Leonard Borkowicz.
