= Kreis Schildberg =

Coordinates: 51°25′23″N 17°55′44″E

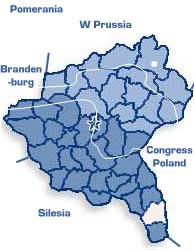

Kreis Schildberg (Polish: Powiat ostrzeszowski) was a county in the southern administrative district of Posen, in the Prussian province of Posen. It presently lies in the south-eastern part of Polish region of Greater Poland Voivodeship.

== Military command ==
Kreis Schildberg was part of the military command (German: Bezirkskommando) in Posen at Ostrowo.

== Court system ==
The main court (German: Landgericht) was in Ostrowo, with lower courts (German: Amtsgericht) in Schildberg.

== Civil registry offices ==
In 1905, these civil registry offices (German: Standesamt) served the following towns in Kreis Schildberg:

- Deutschdorf
- Grabow
- Kobylagora
- Mixstadt
- Morawin
- Parzynow
- Przytocznica
- Schildberg

== Police districts ==
In 1905, these police districts (German: Polizeidistrikt) served towns in Kreis Schildberg:

- Grabow
- Kobylagora
- Mixstadt
- Schildberg

== Catholic churches ==
In 1905, these Catholic parish churches served towns in Kreis Schildberg:

- Bukownica
- Chlewo
- Doruchow
- Grabow
- Kobylagora
- Kotlow
- Mikorzyn
- Mixstadt
- Myschanow
- Parzynow
- Przedborow
- Rogaszyce
- Schildberg
- Wyschanow

== Protestant churches ==
In 1905, Protestant parish churches served towns in Kreis Schildberg:

- Deutschdorf
- Grabow
- Kempen
- Kobylagora
- Schildberg
