= Władysław Wolski (1923–1991) =

German and Prussian lawyer and politician (1828–1901)

Chairperson of the presidium of the National City Council of Szczecin
- In office 5 March 1953 – 30 November 1954
- Preceded by: Bernard Polczyk
- Succeeded by: Jerzy Zieliński

Personal details
- Born: 28 July 1923 Parzynów, Poland
- Died: 6 July 1991 (aged 67)
- Party: Polish Socialist Party (1946–1948); Polish United Workers' Party (from 1948)
- Occupation: Civil servant, politician

Władysław Wolski (Polish: [vwaˈdɘ̟.swaf ˈvɔl.ski]; 28 July 1923 – 6 July 1991) was a Polish civil servant and politician. From 5 March 1953 to 30 November 1954, he was the chairperson of the presidium of the National City Council of Szczecin, Poland, which was an equivalent to an office of the mayor. He belonged to the Polish Socialist Party from 1946 to 1948, and to the Polish United Workers' Party from 1948.

== Biography ==
Władysław Wolski was born on 28 July 1923 in the village of Parzynów, then located in the Poznań Voivodeship within the Second Polish Republic, and now in the Greater Poland Voivodeship in Poland. He came from a family of farmers, being a son of Agnieszka Wolska and Piotr Wolski. Following the end of the Second World War, he begun forming in the administration of Syców County in Wrocław Voivodeship. In 1946, Wolski joined the Polish Socialist Party, which in 1948, was merged into the Polish United Workers' Party. In 1950, he became a secretary of the presidium of the National County Council of Syców County, and later the chairperson of the presidium of the National County Council of Głogów County. In 1952, Wolski became a director of the Department of Organisation of the presidium of the National Voivodeship Council of Szczecin Voivodeship. In 1952, he joined the executive board of the City Committee of the Polish United Workers' Party of Szczecin, and from 5 March 1953 to 30 November 1954, he was the chairperson of the presidium of the National City Council of Szczecin, which was an equivalent to an office of the mayor. Wolski was dismissed from the office following a negative performance evaluation, and was afterwards related to working in the presidium of the National Voivodeship Council of Kraków Voivodeship. He died on 6 July 1991, at the age of 67.
