= Bogdan Augustiański =

Polish politician and economist (1922–1970)

Chairperson of the presidium of the National City Council of Szczecin
- In office 10 June 1969 – 7 April 1970
- Preceded by: Henryk Żukowski
- Succeeded by: Feliks Uciechowski

Personal details
- Born: 26 June 1922 Redecz Krukowy, Poland
- Died: 7 April 1970 (aged 47) Szczecin, Poland
- Party: Polish United Workers' Party
- Education: Szczecin University of Technology
- Occupation: Politician, banker

Bogdan Augustiański (Polish: [ˈbɔɡ.dan aw.ɡusˈtjaɲ.ski]; 26 June 1922 – 7 April 1970) was a Polish politician and banker. From 10 June 1969 until his death on 7 April 1970, he was the chairperson of the presidium of the National City Council of Szczecin, Poland, which was an equivalent of the office of the mayor. He belonged to the Polish United Workers' Party.

== Biography ==
Bogdan Augustiański was born on 26 June 1922, in the village of Redecz Krukowy, then located in the Warsaw Voivodeship within the Second Polish Republic, and now in the Kuyavian–Pomeranian Voivodeship, Poland. He came from an impoverished family. His parents died in 1933, with him remaining in the custody of his older brother. Augustiański graduated from an intermediate school in 1939. During the Second World War, while Poland remained under the German occupation, Augustiański worked in a mill in the village of Choceń, and was active in the Polish resistance movement.

In the 1960s, Augustiański graduated from the Institute of Economics and Management of the Szczecin University of Technology with a degree in economics, and worked as a director of the second branch of the National Bank of Poland in Szczecin. In 1962, he joined the Polish United Workers' Party, and 25 February 1969, he also joined the executive branch of the City Committee of the United Workers' Party in Szczecin. On 10 June 1969 to 7 April 1970, Augustiański was appointed as the chairperson of the presidium of the National City Council of Szczecin, which was an equivalent of the office of the mayor. He died while in office on 7 April 1970 in Szczecin, at the age of 47.
