= Henryk Żukowski =

Polish politician and schoolteacher (1925–1972)

Chairperson of the Presidium of the National City Council of Szczecin
- In office 24 April 1961 – 10 June 1969
- Preceded by: Jerzy Zieliński
- Succeeded by: Bogdan Augustiański

Personal details
- Born: 2 January 1925 Varniškiai, Nowogródek Voivodeship, Second Polish Republic (now part of Lithuania)
- Died: 23 March 1972 (aged 47) Szczecin, Poland
- Resting place: Central Cemetery, Szczecin, Poland
- Party: Polish United Workers' Party (1948–1972); Polish Workers' Party (1946–1948)
- Occupation: Politician, civil servant

Henryk Żukowski (Polish: [ˈxɛn.rɘ̟k ʐuˈkɔf.ski]; 2 January 1925 – 23 March 1972) was a Polish politician and civil servant. From 24 April 1961 to 10 June 1969, he was the chairperson of the National City Council of Szczecin, Poland, which was equivalent to the office of a mayor. Żukowski was a member of the Polish United Workers' Party, and previously, until 1948, of the Polish Workers' Party.

== Biography ==
Henryk Żukowski was born on 2 January 1925 in the village of Varniškiai, then located within Nowogródek Voivodeship in the Second Polish Republic, and now in Utena County, Lithuania. He came from a family of farmers.

In 1946, Żukowski joined the Polish Workers' Party, which in 1948 was merged into the Polish United Workers' Party. In 1955, he was a member of the executive board of the Voivodeship Committee of the Polish United Workers' Party in Szczecin, where from 1957 to 1961 was a deputy chairperson of the Party Control Voivodeship Committee. In 1964, Żukowski joined the executive board of the City Committee of the Polish United Workers' Party in Szczecin. From 24 April 1961 to 10 June 1969, he was the chairperson of the National City Council of Szczecin, which was equivalent to the office of a mayor. In 1969, Żukowski became a voivodeship inspector for Szczecin Voivodeship ib the State Trade Inspectorate.

For many years, Żukowski was also the chairperson of the Friends of Szczecin Society.

Following a prolonged illness, he died on 23 March 1972 in Szczecin, at the age of 47, and was buried at the Central Cemetery in the city.

== Orders and decorations ==
- Gold Cross of Merit
- Gold Honorary Badge of the Polish–Soviet Friendship Society
- Gold Honorary Badge of Pomeranian Griffin
- Knight's Cross of the Order of Polonia Restituta
- Medal of the 10th Anniversary of People's Poland
- Silver Cross of Merit
