= Feliks Uciechowski =

Polish politician and schoolteacher (1920–2022)

Chairperson of the Presidium of the National City Council of Szczecin
- In office 27 May 1970 – 31 July 1982
- Preceded by: Bogdan Augustiański
- Succeeded by: Jan Stopyra

First Secretary of the County Committee of the Polish United Workers' Party in Szczecin County
- In office 1 November 1969 – 1 June 1970
- Preceded by: No data
- Succeeded by: Józef Przybyciński

Personal details
- Born: 20 November 1920 Korytnica, Poland
- Died: 15 August 2022 (aged 101) Szczecin, Poland
- Resting place: Central Cemetery, Szczecin, Poland
- Party: Polish United Workers' Party (from 1948); Polish Workers' Party (until 1948)
- Education: Central Party School of the Polish United Workers' Party; Higher School of Social Sciences of the Central Committee of the Polish United Workers' Party
- Occupation: Politician, schoolteacher

Feliks Uciechowski (Polish: [ˈfɛ.liks u.t͡ɕɛˈxɔf.ski]; 20 November 1920 – 15 September 2022) was a Polish politician and schoolteacher. From 27 May 1970 to 31 July 1982, he was the chairperson of the presidium of the National City Council of Szczecin, Poland, which was an equivalent of the office of the mayor. From 1 November 1969 to 1 June 1970, Uciechowski was the First Secretary of the County Committee of the Polish United Workers' Party in Szczecin County. He was a member of the Polish United Workers' Party, and previously, until 1948, of the Polish Workers' Party.

== Biography ==
Feliks Uciechowski was born on 20 November 1920 in the village of Korytnica, then located in the Poznań Voivodeship within the Second Polish Republic, and now forming a part of the Greater Poland Voivodeship, Poland. He was a son of Maria Uciechowska and Stanisław Uciechowski.

During the Second World War, Uciechowski worked as a locksmith in the H. Cegielski factory in Poznań, Poland. After the end of the conflict, he became a schoolteacher, and was a superintendent in the town of Krosno Odrzańskie. Uciechowski also joined the Polish Workers' Party, which in 1948, was absorbed into the Polish United Workers' Party. In 1951, Uciechowski graduated from the Central Party School of the Polish United Workers' Party in Łódź, and, later he also finished the Higher School of Social Sciences of the Central Committee of the Polish United Workers' Party in Warsaw, with a master's degree in history.

Uciechowski was sent to work in the Voivodeship Committee of the Polish United Workers' Party in Szczecin, where he was an instructor of the Sciences and Education Department in 1952, and a deputy director of the Education Department in 1952 and the Propaganda Department from 1953 to 1955. Uciechowski was later the director of the departments from 1955 to 1956 and from 1962 to 1965, respectively. From 1965 to 1969, he was an attorney-at-law in the embassy of Poland in Berlin, Germany. From 1 November 1969 to 1 June 1970, Uciechowski was the First Secretary of the County Committee of the Polish United Workers' Party in Szczecin County. Afterwars, he remained its member. From 27 May 1970 to 31 July 1982, Uciechowski was the chairperson of the presidium of the National City Council of Szczecin, which was an equivalent of the office of the mayor. He took part in the negotiations with the protestors during the December 1970 protests in Szczecin, and was one of the signatories of an agreement between the municipal government and the protestors, signed in the city on 20 December 1970. Uciechowski was also the chairperson of the Friends of Szczecin Society.

Due to poor health condition, Uciechowski retired on 31 July 1982, receiving a party pension. He died on 15 September 2022 in Szczecin, at the age of 101, and was buried at the Central Cemetery in the city.
