= Stanisław Malec =

Polish engineer and politician (1931–2025)

Voivode of the Szczecin Voivodeship
- In office 1982–1990
- Preceded by: Tadeusz Waluszkiewicz
- Succeeded by: Marek Tałasiewicz

Personal details
- Born: 20 May 1931 Nowy Sącz, Poland
- Died: 24 January 2025 (aged 93) Poland
- Resting place: Central Cemetery, Szczecin, Poland
- Party: Polish United Workers' Party (1959–1990)
- Education: Szczecin University of Technology; Gdańsk University of Technology
- Occupation: Engineer, corporate director, politician

Stanisław Malec (Polish: [staˈɲi.swaf ˈma.lɛt͡s]; 20 May 1931 – 24 January 2025) was a Polish engineer, corporate director, and politician. He served as the voivode of the Szczecin Voivodeship from 1982 to 1990, as a member of the Polish United Workers' Party.

== Biography ==
Stanisław Malec was born on 20 May 1931 in Nowy Sącz, Poland. His family spend the Second World War living in Volhynia, and afterwards moved to the town of Myślibórz in August 1945. He received bachelor's degree in construction from the Higher School of Engineering in Szczecin (now Szczecin University of Technology). In 1954, he received the master's degree in engineering from the Faculty of Water Engineering of the Gdańsk University of Technology.

Malec worked as a deputy director in Przedsiębiorstwo Robót Czerpalnych I Podwodnych (lit. 'Dredging and Underwater Works Company') from 1954 to 1964, as a director in Szczecińskie Przedsiębiorstwo Budownictwa Przemysłowego (lit. 'Szczecin Industrial Construction Company') from 1964 to 1969, in Przedsiębiorstwa Przemysłu Budownictwa Rolniczego w Szczecinie (lit. 'Szczecin Agricultural Construction Industry Enterprises'), and in Szczecińskiego Zjednoczenia Budowlanego (lit. 'Szczecin Construction Association').

Malec was a member of the Polish United Workers' Party from 1959 to its dissolvement in 1990. From 1982 to 1990, he was the voivode of the Szczecin Voivodeship. From 1986 to 1990, he was also a member of the executive body of the Szczecin Voivodeship committee of the Polish United Workers' Party.

Afterwards, he worked as the head specialist in the Szczecin Voivodeship Military Repair and Construction Plant, and later in the Main Office of Building Supervision as the head of the inspection and control office in Szczecin, and as specialist in Przedsiębiorstwo Budowy Tras Komunikacyjnych w Szczecinie (lit. 'Communication Route Construction Company in Szczecin'). In 2010, he became the deputy chairperson of the District Council of the West Pomeranian Chamber of Civil Engineers and the chairperson of the Committee for the Protection of Professional Interests and Career Guidance. Malec died on 24 January 2025, at the age of 93. He was buried at the Central Cemetery in Szczecin.

== Awards and decorations ==
- Commander's Cross of the Order of Polonia Restituta
- Golden Medal of Merit for National Defence
- Golden Badge to the Meritorious to Protection of Public Order
- Golden Badge of Merid of Activist of Physical Culture
- Badge for the 20th Years of Service to the Nation
- Badge to the Meritorious to Koszalin Voivodeship
- Badge to the Meritorious to Gorzów Voivodeship
- Badge of the Pomeranian Griffin
