= Ryszard Rotkiewicz =

Polish politician and activist

Mayor of Szczecin
- In office 1 April 1984 – 18 June 1990
- Preceded by: Jan Stopyra
- Succeeded by: Jan Czesław Bielecki

Deputy voivode of the Szczecin Voivodeship
- In office 1981–1984

Personal details
- Born: 17 May 1938 (age 88) Ivyanyets, Second Polish Republic (now part of Belarus)
- Party: Polish United Workers' Party (1966–1990); Democratic Left Alliance and Labour Union (2002)
- Education: Szczecin University of Technology

Ryszard Rotkiewicz (Polish: [ˈrɘ̟.ʂart rɔtˈkjɛ.vit͡ʂ]; born 17 May 1938) is a Polish politician and local activist. He was the mayor of Szczecin from 1984 to 1990, and the deputy voivode of the Szczecin Voivodeship from 1981 to 1984.

== Biography ==
Ryszard Rotkiewicz was born on 17 May 1938, in Ivyanyets, Second Polish Republic (now part of Belarus). His parents were Stanisław and Regina Rotkiewicz.

He has graduated from the Szczecin University of Technology, with the diploma in the mechanical engineering. From 1966 to 1990, he was a member of the Polish United Workers' Party. From 1964 to 1975 he worked in the Szczecin Steel Mill, and from 1976, he was the director of the Fabryka Mechanizmów Samochodowych Polmo (Polmo Car Machinery Factory).

From January to December 1981, Rotkiewicz was the secretary of the Szczecin Voivodeship Committee of the Polish United Workers' Party, based in Szczecin. From 1981 to 1984, he was the deputy voivode of the Szczecin Voivodeship.

From 1 April 1984 to 27 May 1990, he was the mayor of Szczecin. Following the 1990 local elections, he was the acting mayor until 18 June 1990, when the new mayor, Jan Czesław Bielecki, was appointed by the city council.

During the 2002 local elections, he unsuccessfully run for the office of the member of the West Pomeranian Voivodeship Sejmik, from the mandate of the Democratic Left Alliance and Labour Union.
