= Władysław Lisewski =

Polish politician (1948–2021)

Voivode of the West Pomeranian Voivodeship
- In office 1 January 1999 – 20 October 2001
- Preceded by: office established
- Succeeded by: Stanisław Wziątek

Voivode of the Szczecin Voivodeship
- In office December 1997 – 31 December 1998
- Preceded by: Marek Tałasiewicz
- Succeeded by: office abolished

Mayor of Szczecin
- In office 11 April 1991 – 5 July 1994
- Preceded by: Jan Czesław Bielecki
- Succeeded by: Bartłomiej Sochański

Deputy mayor of Szczecin
- In office 21 June 1990 – 11 April 1991

Personal details
- Born: 11 April 1948 Zbójno, Poland
- Died: 5 July 2021 (aged 73) Szczecin, Poland
- Party: Centre Agreement (1991–1997); Social Movement (1997–2001)
- Education: Szczecin University of Technology; Adam Mickiewicz University

Władysław Tomasz Lisewski (Polish: [vwaˈdɘ̟.swaf ˈtɔ.maʂ liˈsɛf.ski]; 11 April 1948 – 5 July 2021) was a Polish politician. He served as the mayor of Szczecin from 1991 to 1994, the voivode of the Szczecin Voivodeship from 1997 to 1999, and the voivode of the West Pomeranian Voivodeship from 1999 to 2001.

== Biography ==
Władysław Lisewski was born on 11 April 1948, in Zbójno, Poland. His parents were Ignacy Lisewski and Maria Lisewska.

He has earned the degrees in mechanical engineering from the Szczecin University of Technology, and in mathematics from the Adam Mickiewicz University in Poznań. In 1991, he received the title of the Doctor of Engineering from the Szczecin University of Technology. He worked for nineteen years as the teacher in the Mechanical Technology Institute at said university.

In 1980, he joined the Solidarity. From 1991 to 1997, he was a member of the Centre Agreement, and subsequently the Social Movement until 2001.

From 21 June 1990, he was the deputy mayor of Szczecin, Poland. On 11 April 1991, after the city mayor, Jan Czesław Bielecki, was dismissed from the office, Lisewski became acting mayor. He was elected to become the mayor on 22 April 1991, and remained in the office until 5 July 1994. In December 1997, he became the voivode of the Szczecin Voivodeship, and reminded in the office until it was disestablished on 31 December 1998. On 1 January 1999, he became the first voivode of the then-established West Pomeranian Voivodeship, and remained in the office until 20 October 2001.

In January 2006, Lisewski became vice-chairperson of the Administration of the Seaports of Szczecin and Świnoujście, and served as acting chairperson of the company from July to September 2008.

Władysław Lisewski died on 5 July 2021 at the age of 73, in Szczecin. He was buried on 9 July 2021, at the Central Cemetery in Szczecin.

== Orders and decorations ==
- Commander's Cross of the Order of Polonia Restituta (2018)
- Cross of Freedom and Solidarity (2018)
