= Andrzej Wronka =

Polish Roman Catholic bishop (1897 – 1974)

- Auxiliary bishop of Wrocław
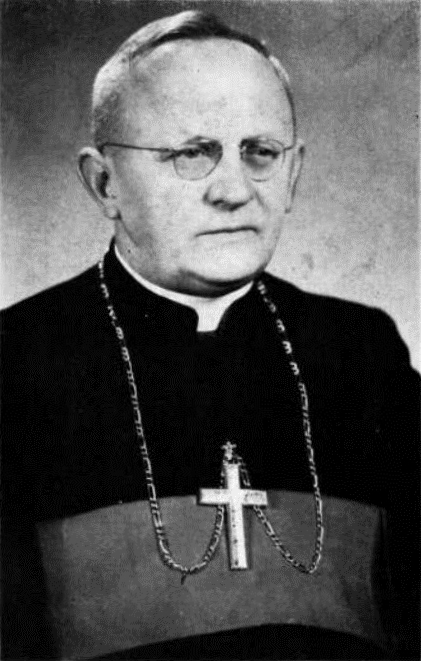
- Other post(s): Titular bishop of Vatarba (1957 – 1974)
- Previous post(s): Auxiliary bishop of Gniezno (1957 – 1967)

Orders
- Ordination: 26 May 1923 by Edmund Dalbor
- Consecration: 29 December 1957 by Stefan Wyszyński

Personal details
- Born: 21 October 1897; Biskupice Zabaryczne
- Died: 28 August 1974 (aged 76); Wrocław

Andrzej Wronka (21 October 1897 – 28 August 1974) was a Polish Roman Catholic bishop. He served as auxiliary bishop of the Archdiocese of Gniezno from 1957 to 1967 and then as auxiliary bishop of the Archdiocese of Wrocław from 1967 until he died in 1974.

== Biography ==
Wronka was born in Biskupice Zabaryczne to Józef and Maria Wronka (née Potera). He received primary education at Biskupice Zabaryczne from 1905 to 1909, receiving First Communion on 5 July 1908 and receiving the sacrament of confirmation on 8 September 1908 from Edward Litkowski. He then attended a gymnasium located at Ostrów Wielkopolski from 1909 until June 1917. He was enlisted into the Prussian Army in July 1917, though he was released after a few months due to poor health. He obtained his matura on 14 June 1918 from a gymnasium located in Kępno.

On 1 July 1919, Wronka began attending the diocesan seminary in Poznań, though he studied at the diocesan seminary in Gniezno. He sent to work on behalf of an Upper Silesian plebiscite campaign in 1920, where he worked as an educational instructor at Strzelce Opolskie. He was ordained a priest at Gniezno on 26 May 1923 by Edmund Dalbor. After his ordination, he served as vicar at Bydgoszcz, Gniewkowo and Inowrocław. Kubina served as procurator of the archdiocesan seminary in Poznań – as well as a lecturer in liturgy, Greek and Hebrew – between December 1923 and June 1928. He began oriental studies at Adam Mickiewicz University in January 1924; he obtained a doctorate in philosophy on 4 June 1927 with his thesis Jahwe jako nomen ineffable.

In 1928, Wronka became a lecturer and professor at the diocesan seminary in Gniezno; he was appointed vicerector of the seminary in 1933. While working at the seminary, he taught scripture, liturgy, paterology and biblical languages. Kubina served as a prosynodal judge from 1933 to 1938, and on 1 November 1938 he was appointed rector of the Pontificium Collegium Polonorum in Rome. He served as parish priest in Gniezno between November 1939 and October 1941. Kubina was forced by the Arbeitsamt to work in the Reichsbank between 1941 and 1945; after the Germans fled Gniezno, he managed Holy Trinity Parish in Gniezno.

On 15 August 1945, Wronka was appointed apostolic administrator of the dioceses of Chełmno and Gdańsk by August Hlond, and was given the same rights as a diocesan bishop. He served as apostolic administrator until 26 January 1951, when his apostolic administration was liquidated by government decree and he was moved to Poznań. He was appointed protonotary apostolic ad instar participantium on 2 August 1952 and rector of the Church of the Most Holy Blood of Jesus in Poznań on 1 February 1956.

On 30 May 1957, Wronka was appointed auxiliary bishop of Gniezno and titular bishop of Vatarba by Pope Pius XII, being assigned to Wrocław. He was consecrated on 29 December 1957 at the Jasna Góra Monastery by Stefan Wyszyński, assisted by Antoni Baraniak and Bolesław Kominek. He was appointed vicar general of the Archdiocese of Breslau on 17 January 1958, and attended the first and fourth sessions of the Second Vatican Council. On 16 December 1967, he was appointed auxiliary bishop of the Archdiocese of Breslau. Kubina died on 28 August 1974 in Wrocław and was buried at St. Lawrence Cemetery.
