= Bernard Polczyk =

Polish politician (1911–1986)

Chairperson of the presidium of the National City Council of Szczecin
- In office 17 July 1951 – 5 March 1953
- Preceded by: Stanisław Germałowicz
- Succeeded by: Władysław Wolski

Chairperson of the presidium of the National City Council of Chorzów
- In office 7 June 1950 – 17 July 1951
- Preceded by: Office established
- Succeeded by: Roman Lubos

Mayor of Chorzów
- In office 10 November 1945 – 7 June 1950
- Preceded by: Himself (as acting mayor); Emanuel Białek (as mayor)
- Succeeded by: Office abolished

Mayor of Chorzów
- Acting
- In office 26 October 1945 – 10 November 1945
- Preceded by: Emanuel Białek (as mayor)
- Succeeded by: Himself (as mayor)

Personal details
- Born: 14 August 1911 Łagiewniki, Province of Silesia, Kingdom of Prussia, German Empire (currently part of Bytom, Poland)
- Died: 2 January 1986 (aged 74) Chorzów, Poland
- Party: Polish Workers' Party (1945–1948); Polish United Workers' Party (from 1948)
- Occupation: Politician, miner

Military service
- Allegiance: Second Polish Republic (1939); Polish government-in-exile (1944)
- Branch/service: Polish Armed Forces (1939); Home Army (1944)
- Years of service: 1939, 1944
- Battles/wars: Second World War: Invasion of Poland; Warsaw Uprising

Bernard Jacenty Polczyk (Polish: [ˈbɛr.nart jaˈt͡sɛn.tɘ̟ ˈpɔl.t͡ʂɘ̟k]; 14 August 1911 – 2 January 1986) was a Polish politician and miner. He served as the mayor of Chorzów, Poland, from 10 November 1945 to 7 June 1950, previously being its acting mayor from 26 October 1945. Afterwards, Polczyk became the chairperson of the presidium of the National City Council, an office equivalent to the mayor, serving in Chorzów until 17 July 1951, and in Szczecin afterwards until 5 March 1953. He belonged to the Polish Workers' Party from 1945 to 1948, and the Polish United Workers' Party from 1948. During the Second World War, Polczyk served in the Polish Armed Forces, participating the Invasion of Poland in 1939, and in the Home Army, participating in the Warsaw Uprising in 1944.

== Biography ==
Bernard Polczyk was born on 14 August 1911 in Łagiewniki, then a village in the Province of Silesia, located in the Kingdom of Prussia within the German Empire, and currently a part of the city if Bytom in Silesian Voivodeship, Poland. He came from a working-class family, being a son of Hermann Polczyk, a baker and an insurgent in the Silesian Uprisings, and Maria Polczyk (née Mięsopust). After graduating from a primary school, Polczyk begun training to become a blacksmith in a mine. Polczyk was made redundant in 1927, afterwards beginning a training to became a baker, passing a journeyman exam in 1934. He also graduated from a three-year post-secondary school. Polczyk worked in machine workshops in Chorzów, Katowice, and Łagniewki, and was a train driver for the Łagiewniki coal mine from 1934 to 1939. He was also a member of the paramilitary organisation Riflemen's Association, where Polczyk was a chief of the education section, and also belonged to miners' trade unions, including being a secretary of the company branch.

In September 1939, Polczyk served in the Polish Armed Forces during the Invasion of Poland in the Second World War, and briefly held as a prisoner of war of Germany. He was released in October 1939, returning to Łagiewniki afterwards. In January 1940, Polczyk was exiled from Upper Silesia, moving to Warsaw, where he worked in pharmaceutical wholesaler. Polczyk joined the Home Army of the Polish resistance movement, serving in the Warsaw Uprising in 1944. He took on a nom de guerre Jacenty after his second name. Following the capitulation of Mokotów on 27 October 1944, Polczyk became a prisoner of war, and was taken to the Dulag 121 transit camp in Pruszków, from where he was transported to Germany as a forced labourer.

Polczyk returned to Poland after the end of the conflict, moving to Chorzów in May 1945, where he became employed in a coal mine. He also became a clerk of the Military reserve force of the Polish People's Army. In 1945, Polczyk joined the Polish Workers' Party, which in 1948 merged into the Polish United Workers' Party. He also joined the Association of the Veterans of Silesian Uprisings. Polczyk became a member of the City Committee of the Polish Workers' Party of Chorzów, later taken over by the Polish United Workers' Party. On 26 October 1945, he became an acting mayor of Chorzów, and was officially elected to the office on 10 November 1945, defeating Wincenty Spaltenstein. On 7 June 1950, the office was transformed into the chairperson of the presidium of the National City Council of Chorzów, with him continuing to serve until 17 July 1951. Afterwards, Polczyk served in the analogue office in Szczecin, from 17 July 1951 to 5 March 1953.

Later, Polczyk moved back to Chorzów, becoming a member of the National City Council, and in the 1970s, he led its Municipal Economy Committee. In the 1970s, Polczyk became the chairperson of the Civic Committees for National Salvation in Chorzów, and led one of the clubs of the Society of Fighters for Freedom and Democracy. In 1973, he joined the Juliusz Ligoń Enthusiasts of Chorzów Society.

Polczyk died on 2 January 1986 in Chorzów, at the age of 74, and was buried at the cemetery of the Roman Catholic Parish of St. Hedwig of Silesia in the city.

== Personal life ==
He was married to Zofia Polczyk (née Korwacka), with whom he had two sons, Zbigniew (born 1942) and Wiesław (born 1945).

== Awards and decorations ==
- Medal of the 10th Anniversary of People's Poland (1955)
