= Stopyra =

Stopyra (Polish: [stɔˈpɘ̟.ra]) is a Polish-language surname. Notable people with the surname include:

- Jan Stopyra (1934–2023), a Polish politician and economist, mayor of Szczecin, Poland
- Yannick Stopyra (born 1961), a French footballer
