= Jerzy Zieliński (diplomat) =

Polish diplomat and politician (1925–1986)

Ambassador of Poland to Hungary
- In office 20 May 1983 – 30 May 1986
- Preceded by: Tadeusz Pietrzak
- Succeeded by: Tadeusz Czechowicz

Chairperson of the Presidium of the National City Council of Szczecin
- In office 18 December 1954 – 31 July 1961
- Preceded by: Władysław Wolski
- Succeeded by: Henryk Żukowski

Personal details
- Born: 3 January 1925 Gniezno, Poland
- Died: 30 May 1986 (aged 61) Budapest, Hungary
- Resting place: Powązki Military Cemetery, Warsaw, Poland
- Party: Polish United Workers' Party (1948–1986); Polish Workers' Party (1947–1948)
- Occupation: Diplomat, politician

Jerzy Zieliński (Polish: [ˈjɛ.ʐɘ̟ ʑɛˈliɲ.ski]; 3 January 1925 – 30 May 1986) was a Polish diplomat and politician. He was the ambassador of Poland to Hungary from 20 May 1983 until his death on 30 May 1986. From 18 December 1954 to 31 July 1961, Zieliński was the chairperson of the Presidium of the National City Council of Szczecin, Poland, which was equivalent to an office of a mayor. He was a member of the Polish United Workers' Party, and previously, until 1948, of the Polish Workers' Party.

== Biography ==
Zieliński was born on 3 January 1925, in Gniezno, the son of Józef Zieliński and Maria Zielińska. He grew up in the town of Czarnków, where his father was a sports activist. Following the German invasion into Poland in 1939, together with his pregnant mother and younger brother, he escaped to Hungary, where they settled in Zamárdi and later moved to Balatonboglár in 1940, where he graduated from a Polish intermediate school. His father remained in Poland, indenting to join the resistance movement. He was however soon arrested in placed in the Mauthausen concentration camp, where he remained until the end of the conflict. While living in Hungary, Jerzy Zieliński's mother gave birth to his younger sister.

In 1947, Zieliński moved to the city of Szczecin in Poland, where he begun working as a caregiver in an orphanage. Zieliński simultaneously continued his education, graduating from the 2nd Intermediate and Secondary School in Szczecin (now Mieszko I 2nd General Education Secondary School). In 1947, he joined the Polish Workers' Party, which in 1948 merged into the Polish United Workers' Party. Between 1949 and 1954, Zieliński was successively a director of the Office of Social Action in Szczecin, the chief of the Training Department and the director of the Organisational Department of the District Trade Union Commission in Szczecin. From 1952 to 1954, he was the secretary of the Council of the District Voivodeship Trade Unions in Szczecin. In 1955, Zieliński joined the executive committee of the City Committee of the Polish United Workers' Party in Szczecin. From 18 December 1954 to 31 July 1961, he was the chairperson of the Presidium of the National City Council of Szczecin, which was equivalent to an office of a mayor. While in office, Zieliński graduated with a law degree from a university in Poznań, Poland.

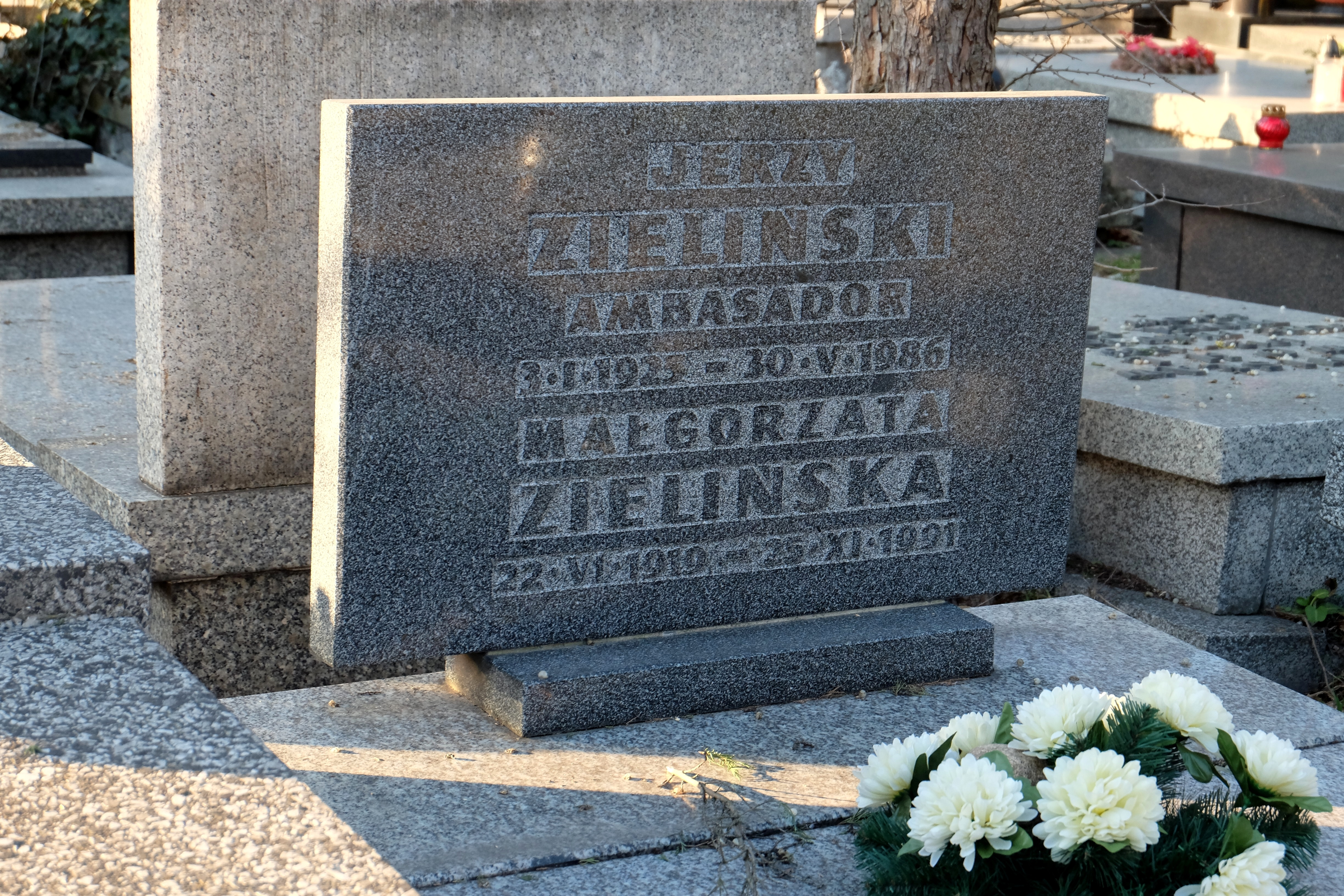
The grave of Jerzy Zieliński at the Powązki Military Cemetery in Warsaw.

In 1961, Zieliński begun working in the diplomatic corps of the Ministry of Foreign Affairs of Poland. The same year, he was sent to the embassy of Poland in Budapest, Hungary, where Zieliński was a press attaché, the first secretary, and an attorney-at-law. He returned to Poland in 1967, working as an expert in the Ministry of Foreign Affairs in Warsaw, Poland. In 1972, Zieliński was a deputy chief of mission and an attorney-at-law in the embassy in Budapest. Afterwords, he returned to Warsaw, becoming a deputy director of a department in the ministry. On 20 May 1983, Zieliński appointed as the ambassador of Poland to Hungary. He died from a heart attack while in office on 30 May 1986 in Budapest, at the age of 61. Zieliński was buried at the Powązki Military Cemetery in Warsaw.

== Personal life ==
Zieliński had a wife and a daughter. He was fluent in French, Hungarian, and Polish.

== Orders and decorations ==
- Commander's Cross of the Order of Polonia Restituta (Poland)
- Knight's Cross of the Order of Polonia Restituta (Poland)
- Silver Cross of Merit (Poland)
- Order of the Banner of Labour, second class (Poland)
- Order of the Flag of the People's Republic of Hungary (1977, Hungary)
