= Stanisław Germałowicz =

Polish politician and civil servant (1903–1984)

Chairperson of the Presidium of the National City Council of Szczecin
- In office 7 June 1950 – 6 July 1951
- Preceded by: Piotr Zaremba (as the mayor)
- Succeeded by: Bernard Polczyk

Personal details
- Born: 22 November 1903 Warsaw, Kingdom of Poland, Russian Empire (now part of Poland)
- Died: 8 May 1984 (aged 80)
- Resting place: Powązki Military Cemetery, Warsaw, Poland
- Party: Communist Party of Poland (1923–1938); Polish Workers' Party (1945–1948); Polish United Workers' Party (1948–1984)
- Occupation: Politician, civil servant

Military service
- Allegiance: Soviet Union
- Branch/service: Red Army
- Years of service: 1942–?
- Battles/wars: Second World War

Stanisław Germałowicz (Polish: [staˈɲi.swaf ɡɛr.maˈwɔ.vit͡ʂ]; 22 November 1903 – 8 May 1984) was a Polish politician and civil servant. From 7 June 1950 to 6 July 1951, he was the chairperson of the Presidium of the National City Council of Szczecin, Poland, which was equivalent to the office of a mayor. Germałowicz was a member of the Communist Party of Poland from 1923 to 1938, Polish Workers' Party from 1945 to 1948, and the Polish United Workers' Party from 1948. During the Second World War, he served in the Red Army of the Soviet Union.

== Biography ==
Stanisław Germałowicz was born on 22 November 1903 in the city of Warsaw, in the Kingdom of Poland within the Russian Empire, now part of Poland. He was a son of factory workers Jan and Rozalia Germałowicz, and grew up in the city district of Wola. Germałowicz was a member of the Communist Party of Poland from 1923 to 1938, and the Polish Workers' Party from 1945 to 1948. The latter was merged into the Polish United Workers' Party in 1948.

During the Second World War, Germałowicz served in the Red Army of the Soviet Union, joining in 1942. After the war, was the first secretary in the City Committee of the Polish Workers' Party in Lublin from 1945 to 1946, and in Szczecin in 1947. Later that year, he worked for the state-owned energy company Zjednoczenie Energetyczne Okręgu Pomorza Zachodniego in Szczecin (renamed to Zjednoczenie Energetyczne Okręgu Szczecińskiego in 1948). In February 1948, Germałowicz begun working in the City Committee of the Polish Workers' Party in Szczecin, later transformed into the City Committee of the Polish United Workers' Party in December of that year. From 7 June 1950 to 6 July 1951, he was the chairperson of the Presidium of the National City Council of Szczecin, which was equivalent to the office of a mayor. Germałowicz died on 8 May 1984, at the age of 80, and was buried at the Powązki Military Cemetery in Warsaw.

== Orders and decorations ==
- Order of the Builders of People's Poland (1974)
- Order of the Banner of Labour, second class (1956)
- Medal of the 10th Anniversary of People's Poland (1955)
- Silver Cross of Merit (1955)
