= Rudolf Hübner =

German general during World War II

Dr. med. dent. Rudolf Huebner
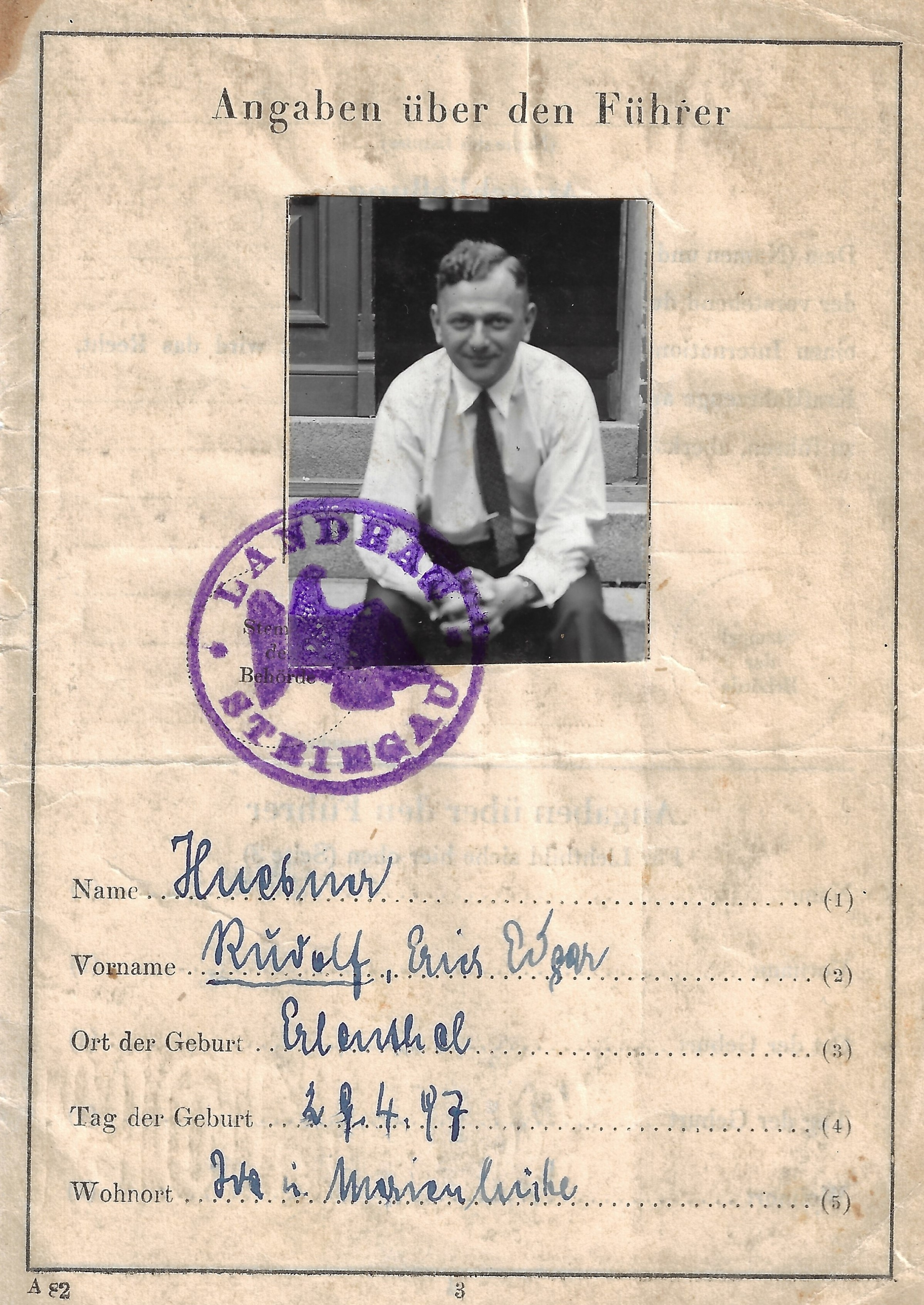
- Born: Rudolph Erich Edgar Huebner; 29 April 1897; Erlenthal Estate, Kreis Schildberg, Province of Posen, Kingdom of Prussia, German Empire
- Died: 28 February 1965 (aged 67); Lemgo, North Rhine-Westphalia, West Germany
- Relatives: ∞ 1923 Ellinor Wils; 3 sons
- Military career
- Allegiance: German Empire; Weimar Republic; Nazi Germany
- Branch: Imperial German Army; Freikorps (1920/21); German Army
- Rank: Generalleutnant
- Conflicts: World War I Silesian Uprisings; World War II: Battle of France; Eastern Front
- Awards: Knight's Cross of the Iron Cross
- Other work: Dentist, DMD, PhD

Rudolf Erich Edgar Huebner (29 April 1897 – 28 February 1965) was a German general during World War II. He was a recipient of the Knight's Cross of the Iron Cross of Nazi Germany.

== Life ==
Rudolf was born the son of lord of the manor (Rittergut Erlenthal) Rudolph/Rudolf Huebner, later (after selling the estate) administrator of a large agricultural estate, and his wife Paula/Pauline, née Stumpfe.

Hübner entered the Imperial German Army during the First World War on 25 July 1916 as a volunteer in the Replacement Battalion/Reserve Infantry Regiment No. 22 of the Prussian Army in Breslau. On 4 November 1916, he was transferred to the 4th Company/4th Lower Silesian Infantry Regiment No. 51 on the Western Front. On 16 June 1917, he was wounded.

From 1917 until the end of the war he was with the Sturm Battalion No. 16. In this he was promoted to lieutenant on 27 September 1918 and then commanded to an officer's course, where he experienced the end of the war. On 28 November 1918 he was released from active service. On 11 October 1917, he was transferred to the 8th Company/Grenadier Regiment “King Friedrich III.” (2nd Silesian) No. 11, from November 1917 on the Macedonian Front. On 1 December 1917, he fell severely ill suffering from paratyphoid fever. In c. mid-1918, he was commanded to the Storm Battalion No. 16 on the Western Front. On 28 November 1918, he was transferred to the Replacement Battalion/Grenadier Regiment “King Friedrich III.” (2nd Silesian) No. 11 for demobilization and on 3 December 1918, he was discharged from military service.

As of May 1919, he began studying dentistry in Breslau and Greifswald. In 1920–21, during his time in Breslau, he joined a Freikorps—or self-defense unit—in nearby Upper Silesia and took part in the conflicts surrounding the plebiscite and the self-defense operations against Polish insurgents. He successfully passed the state examination in 1922 and obtained his doctorate in 1923.

Subsequently Hübner worked as a general dentist in Saarau, Striegau district—or, from 1932, Schweidnitz district—(Lower Silesia). Dr. Huebner's dental practice was located at Schweidnitzer Straße 29.

In 1934, he took part in two Reichswehr reserve training exercises. On 1 March 1935, after he had applied, he was appointed a supplementary officer candidate and was employed on a trial basis. On 1 September 1935, he was officially employed as a company commander in the supplementary battalion Oppeln A (later supplementary battalion 41). On July 15, 1936 followed in the course of the upgrade of the Wehrmacht his acquisition into active service. On March 1, 1937, he was appointed commander of the 6th Company in Infantry Regiment 18.

In the mobilization before the Second World War, he was appointed company commander in the Infantry Regiment 167, which belonged to the 86th Infantry Division, appointed. In late January 1940, he was appointed commander of the Second Battalion of the Infantry Regiment 529 and promoted to Major on 1 March 1940. The battalion he led in the Western campaign, which ended on June 22, 1940 with the capitulation of France. On April 1, 1942, he was promoted to lieutenant colonel. On April 9, 1942 he was charged with the leadership of the 529th Infantry Regiment, which belonged to the 299th Infantry Division. On August 26, 1942, he was appointed commander of the 529th Infantry Regiment. From its renaming in October 1942, he was commander of the Grenadier Regiment 529th On December 1, 1942 he was promoted to colonel. On April 21, 1943, he was awarded the German Cross in Gold. In May 1943, Hübner issued his memorandum on military education (Title: What do we fight for?), which was distributed to the officer corps by the Wehrmacht High Command (OKW) with 300,000 copies. On July 1, 1943, he gave his command and was transferred to the Führerreserve. In September 1943 he was transferred to the army personnel office. From spring 1944 he was commanded to the National Socialist command staff of the OKW (see National Socialist management officer).

From 1 August 1944 he was appointed Chief of Staff by the National Socialist Command Staff of the OKH. On 1 January 1945 he was promoted to Major General. On February 1, 1945, he gave his command and was simultaneously charged with the leadership of the 303rd Infantry Division. On March 1, 1945, he was promoted to lieutenant general and eight days later awarded the Knight's Cross of the Iron Cross.

Hitler was incensed by the loss of the Ludendorff Bridge during the Battle of Remagen on 7 March 1945. He summoned the "fanatical and reliable Nazi" Generalleutnant Hübner from the Eastern Front and personally appointed him Commander of Fliegendes Sonder-Standgericht West ("Flying Special Court-Martial West"). He directed him to court-martial and execute the officers who failed to destroy the bridge.

General Hubner tried Major Hans Scheller, Captain Willi Bragte, Lt. Karl Heinz Peters, Maj. Herbert Strobel and Maj. August Kraft.

Hübner, who had no legal experience, acted as both prosecutor and judge. He conducted extremely brief show trials during which he harangued the defendants for their alleged command failures, and then pronounced sentence. All of the officers were sentenced to death. Except for Bratge, who had been captured, the others were taken to a nearby woods within 24 hours, executed with a shot to the back of the neck, and buried where they fell.

On 28 April 1945 Hübner was appointed on command of Albert Kesselring commander of combat of Munich. Under his command, 200 people were hanged or shot in the last days of the war. Hübner "left quietly" (quote Henke), as Munich was taken on 30 April 1945. On 8 May 1945 Hübner was first in US American, later in British captivity. From this he was released in April 1948. In a post-war trial in Koblenz, he was sentenced to 10 years in prison for the death sentences of Rimbach.

== Promotions ==
- 25 July 1916 Kriegsfreiwilliger (War Volunteer)
- 2 April 1917 Gefreiter (Private E-2/Lance Corporal)
- 11 February 1918 Unteroffizier (NCO/Corporal/Junior Sergeant)
  - 11 March 1918 appointed Reserve Officer Candidate
- 12 September 1918 Vizefeldwebel (Vice Sergeant/Vice Staff Sergeant)
- 27 September 1918 Leutnant der Reserve (2nd Lieutenant of the Reserves) with Patent from 1 October 1918
- 1 September 1935 Hauptmann/E-Offizier (supplemental Captain) with effect from 1 June 1935 and Rank Seniority (RDA) from 1 December 1934
- 10 July 1936 Hauptmann (active Captain) with effect from 15 July 1936 and RDA from 1 June 1934
  - 6 October 1936 received ordinal number (Ordnungsnummer) "187" to his RDA from 1 June 1934
- 29 February 1940 Major with effect and RDA from 1 March 1940 (81)
- 16 March 1942 Oberstleutnant (Lieutenant Colonel) with effect and RDA from 1 April 1942 (531)
- 15 February 1943 Oberst (Colonel) with effect and RDA from 1 December 1942 (73)
- 21 December 1944 Generalmajor (Major General) with effect and RDA from 1 January 1945 (20)
- 17 March 1945 (telex date) Generalleutnant (Lieutenant General) with effect from 9 March 1945 and RDA from 1 March 1945

== Awards and decorations ==
- Iron Cross (1914), 2nd Class on 16 June 1917
- Wound Badge (1918) in Black
- Silesian Eagle, 2nd Grade on 15 July 1921
- Honour Cross of the World War 1914/1918 with Swords on 19 February 1936
- Wehrmacht Long Service Award, 4th Class on 30 November 1936
- Repetition Clasp 1939 to the Iron Cross 1914, 2nd Class on 15 June 1940
- Iron Cross (1939), 1st Class on 15 June 1940
- Infantry Assault Badge in Silver
- German Cross in Gold on 21 April 1943
- Knight's Cross of the Iron Cross on 9 March 1945

== Sources ==
- German Federal Archives: BArch PERS 6/643 and PERS 6/299914
