= Jan Stopyra =

Polish politician and economist (1934–2023)

Member of the Szczecin City Council
- In office 2002–2018

Mayor of Szczecin
- In office 17 December 1973 – 31 March 1984
- Preceded by: Office established
- Succeeded by: Ryszard Rotkiewicz

Chairperson of the Presidium of the National City Council of Szczecin
- In office 26 June 1972 – 17 December 1973
- Preceded by: Feliks Uciechowski
- Succeeded by: Office abolished

Personal details
- Born: 16 December 1934 Ivano-Frankivsk, Second Polish Republic (now part of Ukraine)
- Died: 16 August 2023 (aged 88) Szczecin, Poland
- Resting place: Central Cemetery, Szczecin, Poland
- Party: Independents of West Pomerania; Civic Platform; Left and Democrats; Democratic Left Alliance; Democratic Left Alliance and Labour Union; Polish United Workers' Party
- Spouse: Krystyna Stopyra
- Education: Higher School of Economics in Szczecin; Kraków School of Economics

Jan Władysław Stopyra (Polish: [ˈjan vwaˈdɘ̟.swaf stɔˈpɘ̟.ra]; 16 December 1934 – 16 August 2023) was a Polish politician, lecturer and economist. From 26 June 1972 to 17 December 1973, Stopyra was the chairperson of the Presidium of the National City Council of Szczecin, Poland which was equivalent of an office of the mayor. Following the changes to the governing system, he served as mayor of Szczecin from 17 December 1973 to 31 March 1984. From 2002 to 2018, he was a councilor in Szczecin, and the chairperson of its municipal council from 2002 to 2006, and from 2010 to 2014.

== Biography ==
Jan Stopyra was born on 16 December 1934 in Ivano-Frankivsk, then located in the Second Polish Republic, and now in Ukraine. His parents were Stanisław Stopyra and Maria Stopyra (née Lech), and he has older brother Leszek Storypa. His father was an officer of the Polish Armed Forces, and served during the invasion of Poland in 1939. In 1943, Stanisław Stopyra was arrested by the People's Commissariat for Internal Affairs of the Soviet Union, while the family were forced by the Soviet officers to leave Ivano-Frankivsk in 1944. They moved to a village of Ugriniv in the Ukrainian SSR, where they were reunited with Stanisław Stopyra, 16 months after his arrest. In 1945, the family moved to the town of Przeworsk, and later to the villages of Grodzisko Dolne and Białośliwie. After the end of the war, they moved to the town Nakło nad Notecią, where Stopyra attended a primary school. His father moved to Szczecin, where he owned a small store. Stopyra graduated from a high school in Bydgoszcz, and begun studying law in Toruń, with aim of becoming a lawyer, however he quit after first semester, and moved to Szczecin in 1950.

Stopyra graduated from the Higher School of Economics in Szczecin, and worked at the university from 1954 to 1959, as a lecturer in its military student program. In 1957, he graduated from the Kraków School of Economics, with a master's degree in economics. In the late 1950s, Stopyra became an assistant director at the State Fruit and Vegetable Enterprise in Szczecin, and in 1959, he was arrested and accused of leading an organised criminal group, being sentenced for four and half years in prison in Szczecin. On 30 December 1959, the military court in Szczecin found him innocent.

Afterwards, Stopyra was hired in the Municipal Sanitation Companies, he was a sales department manager, and later the director assistant of the exploitation department. In 1963, Stopyra became the assistant director of the residential matters in the Szczecin City Union of Municipal and Housing Economy. In the 1960s, he joined the Polish United Workers' Party. In 1970, Stopyra was appointed as the director of investment department in the Szczecin Shipyard, however he quit after few days, returning to working in the Szczecin City Union of Municipal and Housing Economy. In 1971, Stopyra became the director of the Szczecin Voivodeship Union of Municipal and Housing Economy.

From 26 June 1972 to 17 December 1973, Stopyra was the chairperson of the Presidium of the National City Council of Szczecin, which was equivalent of an office of the mayor. Following the changes to the governing system, he was appointed as the mayor of Szczecin on 17 December 1973. During his term, the city begun the construction of the neighbourhoods of Kijewo, Osiedle Książąt Pomorskich, Osiedle Majowe, Osiedle Słoneczne, and continued development of the neighbourhood of Zawadzkiego-Klonowica, as well redevelopment of the sections of the city and buildings which were destroyed during the Second World War, and renovation of historic tenements. Numerous garden squares and recreational objects were opened, including the creation of the Fountain Avenue, a complex of fountains at the Pope John Paul II Avenue, considered one of the most visited recreational walking routes in the city. During his time as the mayor, the road network was also expanded, including the commencement of the construction of the Castle Route, a major road link connecting the city across the Oder river. The Szczecin Shipyard was expanded, a water treatment plant, and several new factories were opened, and drinking water and gas pipes were built leading to the city. Stopyra also oversaw the construction of the Monument to the Polish Endeavour, which is now seen as one of the symbols of Szczecin. On 15 March 1984, Stopyra resigned from his office, which he left on 31 March. Afterwards, he became a consul of Poland, serving in Varna, Bulgaria from 1984 to 1988.

After his return to Poland, Stopyra became an attorney-in-fact of the voivode of the Szczecin Voivodeship, to oversee the founding of the Szczecin–Świnoujście Customs Free Zone (Polish: Wolny Obszar Celny Szczecin–Świnoujście), later becoming its deputy chairperson, after it was transformed into a public limited company. He retired in 1992.

In 2002, Stopyra was elected as a councilor in Szczecin, from the electoral list of the Democratic Left Alliance and Labour Union electoral committee. In the 2005 parliamentary election, Stopyra unsuccessfully run for office in the Senate of Poland from the constituency no. 40, centered around Szczecin, as a candidate of the Democratic Left Alliance. He was reelected to the Szczecin City Council in 2006, on the electoral list of the Left and Democrats party. Stopyra was again reelected in 2010, on the electoral list of the Civic Platform.

He was reelected to the council in 2014, on the electoral list of the Independents of West Pomerania. From 2002 to 2006, and from 2010 to 2014, Stopyra was the chairperson of the council. He unsuccessfully run for reelection in 2018, as the candidate on the electoral list of the Independents of West Pomerania. In 2019, he was appointed as the attorney-in-fact of the mayor in senior citizen maters. He was also a member and a chairperson of the Association of the Friends of Szczecin.

Stopyra died on 16 August 2023 in Szczecin at the age of 88. He was buried at the Central Cemetery in Szczecin.

== Personal life ==
Jan Stopyra was married to dentist Krystyna Stopyra (née Knitter), with whom he had a son.

== Awards and decorations ==
- 30th Anniversary Medal of Pomeranian Griffin (1975)
- Meritorious Activist of the Volunteer Reserve of the Citizens' Militia (1975)
- Bronze Badge of the Meritorious to Fire Protection (2005)
- Medal for Merit to the City of Szczecin (2010)
- Silver Cross of Merit
- Gold Cross of Merit
- Officer's Cross of the Order of Polonia Restituta
- Knight's Cross of the Order of Polonia Restituta
- Medal of the Commission of National Education
- Pomeranian Griffin Badge of Honour (twice)

== Selected published works ==
- 1972: "Jak widzę swoje miasto po roku? Odpowiadając na raport", in Kurier Szczeciński, Szczecin, 1972, no. 282, pp. 7, 10.
- 1975: "'Być szczecinianinem'. Była to gospodarska rozmowa...", in Kurier Szczeciński, Szczecin, 1975, no. 216, p. 5.
- 1975: "Nic co szczecińskie nie jest wam obce", in Trzydziestolecie Kuriera Szczecińskiego, Szczecin, pp. 4–6.
- 1985: "Refleksje po 12 latach", in Kronika Miasta Szczecina 1983, pp. 21–31.
- 2007: "Henryk Boehlke (1920-2006)", in Kronika Szczecina 2006, pp. 161-162.
- 2012: "Narodziny Kroniki Szczecina", in Kronika Szczecina 2011, pp. 5-7.
