= Mikstat-Pustkowie =

- Village
- Location within Poland
- Coordinates: 51°31′28″N 17°56′11″E
- Country: Poland
- Voivodeship: Greater Poland
- County: Ostrzeszów
- Gmina: Mikstat

Mikstat-Pustkowie [ˈmikstat pustˈkɔvjɛ] is a village in the administrative district of Gmina Mikstat, within Ostrzeszów County, Greater Poland Voivodeship, in west-central Poland.
