= Kaliszkowice Ołobockie =

- Village
- Location within Poland
- Coordinates: 51°32′57″N 18°3′5″E
- Country: Poland
- Voivodeship: Greater Poland
- County: Ostrzeszów
- Gmina: Mikstat
- Population: 880

Kaliszkowice Ołobockie [kaliʂkɔˈvit͡sɛ ɔwɔˈbɔt͡skʲɛ] is a village in the administrative district of Gmina Mikstat, within Ostrzeszów County, Greater Poland Voivodeship, in west-central Poland.
