= Komorów, Greater Poland Voivodeship =

Komorów
- Village
- Location within Poland
- Coordinates: 51°31′5″N 17°57′58″E
- Country: Poland
- Voivodeship: Greater Poland
- County: Ostrzeszów
- Gmina: Mikstat

Komorów [kɔˈmɔruf] is a village in the administrative district of Gmina Mikstat, within Ostrzeszów County, Greater Poland Voivodeship, in west-central Poland.
