= Jan Czesław Bielecki =

Polish politician (born 1940)

Mayor of Szczecin
- In office 18 June 1990 – 11 April 1991
- Preceded by: Ryszard Rotkiewicz
- Succeeded by: Władysław Lisewski

Personal details
- Born: 1940 (age 85–86) Łomża, Poland
- Education: Szczecin University of Technology

Jan Czesław Bielecki (Polish: [ˈjan ˈt͡ʂɛ.swaf bjɛˈlɛt͡s.ki]; born 1940) is a Polish retired politician. He was the mayor of Szczecin, Poland from 18 June 1990 to 11 April 1991.

== Biography ==
Jan Czesław Bielecki was born in 1940 in Łomża, Poland. He has graduated from the Szczecin University of Technology.

From 18 June 1990 to 11 April 1991, he was the mayor of Szczecin, Poland, appointed by the city council. He was the first mayor of the city to be appointed after the elections following the democratic transition from the government of the Polish People's Republic to the Third Polish Republic.

He was recalled from the office in 1991, with the accusations of incompetence, and excessively frequent foreign visits that produced nothing for the city. He was replaced by deputy mayor Władysław Lisewski.
