= Gmina Mikstat =

Gmina Mikstat Mikstat Commune
- Gmina
- Flag Coat of arms
- Interactive map of Gmina Mikstat
- Coordinates (Mikstat): 51°32′N 17°58′E
- Country: Poland
- Voivodeship: Greater Poland
- County: Ostrzeszów
- Seat: Mikstat

Area
  - Total: 87.17 km^{2} (33.66 sq mi)

Population (2006)
  - Total: 6,187
  - Density: 70.98/km^{2} (183.8/sq mi)
  - Urban: 1,840
  - Rural: 4,347
- Website: http://www.mikstat.pl/

Gmina Mikstat is an urban-rural gmina (administrative district) in Ostrzeszów County, Greater Poland Voivodeship, in west-central Poland. Its seat is the town of Mikstat, which lies approximately 15 kilometres (9 mi) north of Ostrzeszów and 121 km (75 mi) south-east of the regional capital Poznań.

The gmina covers an area of 87.17 square kilometres (33.7 sq mi), and as of 2006 its total population is 6,187 (out of which the population of Mikstat amounts to 1,840, and the population of the rural part of the gmina is 4,347).

== Villages ==
Apart from the town of Mikstat, Gmina Mikstat contains the villages and settlements of Biskupice Zabaryczne, Kaliszkowice Ołobockie, Komorów, Kotłów, Mikstat-Pustkowie and Przedborów.

== Neighbouring gminas ==
Gmina Mikstat is bordered by the gminas of Grabów nad Prosną, Ostrzeszów, Przygodzice and Sieroszewice.
