= Redecz Krukowy =

- Village
- Location within Poland
- Coordinates: 52°36′N 18°47′E
- Country: Poland
- Voivodeship: Kuyavian-Pomeranian
- County: Włocławek
- Gmina: Brześć Kujawski
- Elevation: 101 m (331 ft)
- Population: 220

Redecz Krukowy [ˈrɛdɛt͡ʂ kruˈkɔvɨ] is a village in the administrative district of Gmina Brześć Kujawski, within Włocławek County, Kuyavian-Pomeranian Voivodeship, in north-central Poland.
