= Mikstat =

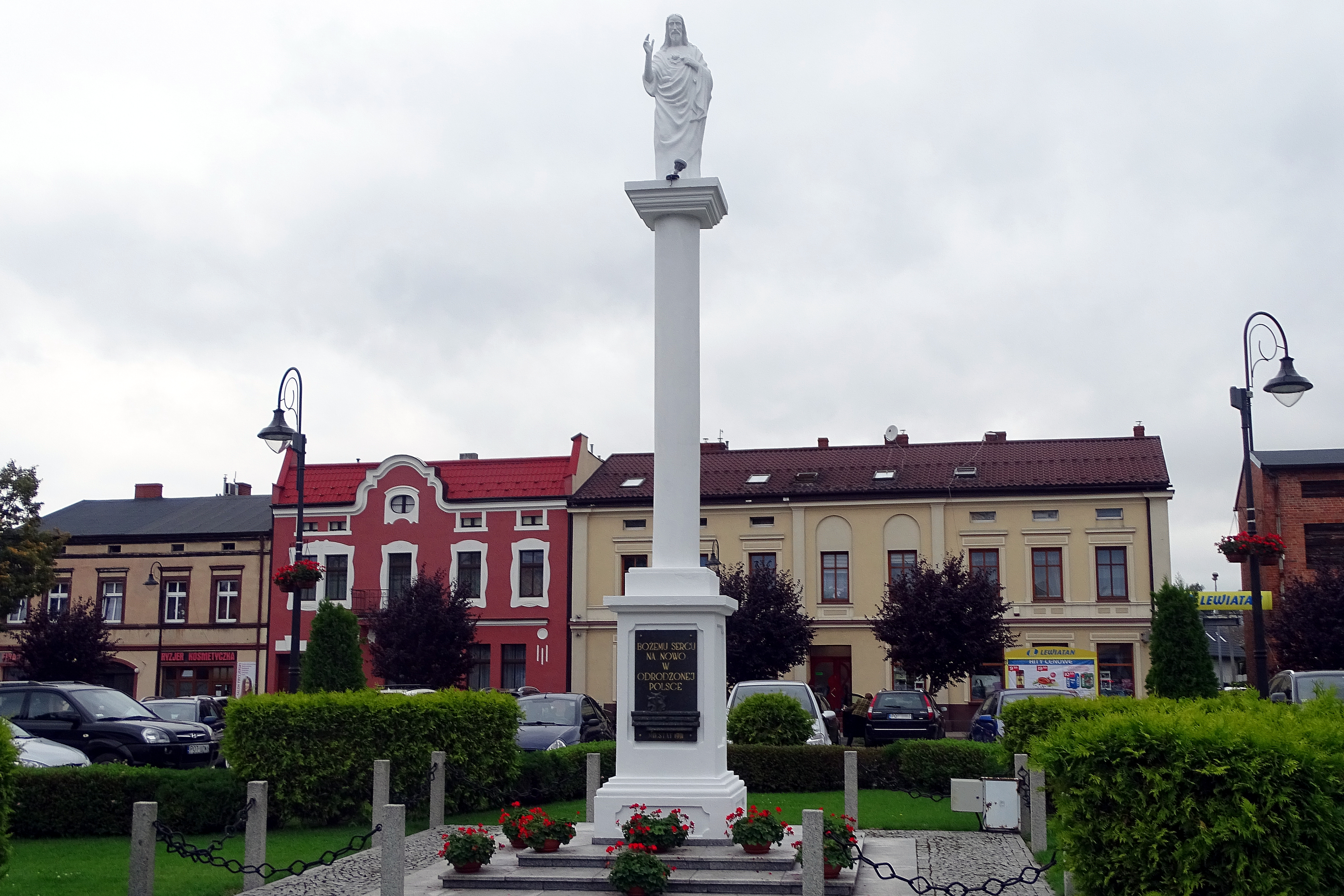
- Market Square in Mikstat

- Flag Coat of arms

- Location within Poland
- Coordinates: 51°32′N 17°58′E
- Country: Poland
- Voivodeship: Greater Poland
- County: Ostrzeszów
- Gmina: Mikstat

Area
  - Total: 2.49 km^{2} (0.96 sq mi)
- Elevation: 215 m (705 ft)

Population (31.XII.2024)
  - Total: 1,687
  - Density: 678/km^{2} (1,750/sq mi)
- Time zone: UTC+1 (CET)
  - Summer (DST): UTC+2 (CEST)
- Postal code: 63-510
- Vehicle registration: POT
- Website: http://www.mikstat.pl

Mikstat [ˈmʲikstat] (historic name:Komorów) is a town in Ostrzeszów County, Greater Poland Voivodeship, in south-central Poland, with 1,687 inhabitants (2024).

Mikstat was granted town rights before 1366. It was royal town of the Kingdom of Poland, administratively located in the Ostrzeszów County in the Sieradz Voivodeship in the Greater Poland Province.

== Transport ==
Mikstat lies along vovoideship road 447.

The nearest railway station is in Antonin.
