= Biskupice Zabaryczne =

- Village
- Location within Poland
- Coordinates: 51°34′N 17°59′E
- Country: Poland
- Voivodeship: Greater Poland
- County: Ostrzeszów
- Gmina: Mikstat

Biskupice Zabaryczne [biskuˈpit͡sɛ zabaˈrɨt͡ʂnɛ] is a village in the administrative district of Gmina Mikstat, within Ostrzeszów County, Greater Poland Voivodeship, in west-central Poland.
