= Kotłów =

- Village
- Location within Poland
- Coordinates: 51°32′59″N 17°58′19″E
- Country: Poland
- Voivodeship: Greater Poland
- County: Ostrzeszów
- Gmina: Mikstat

Kotłów [ˈkɔtwuf] is a village in the administrative district of Gmina Mikstat, within Ostrzeszów County, Greater Poland Voivodeship, in west-central Poland.
