= Przedborów =

- Village
- Location within Poland
- Coordinates: 51°30′N 18°1′E
- Country: Poland
- Voivodeship: Greater Poland
- County: Ostrzeszów
- Gmina: Mikstat

Przedborów [pʂɛdˈbɔruf] is a village in the administrative district of Gmina Mikstat, within Ostrzeszów County, Greater Poland Voivodeship, in west-central Poland.
