= Szczecin Voivodeship (1975–1998) =

Former voivodeship of Poland

Coordinates: 53°25′17″N 14°33′03″E

- Voivodeship of the Polish People's Republic and Third Polish Republic
- 1975–1998
- The administrative subdivisions of Poland from 1975 to 1998, including the Szczecin Voivodeship.
- Capital: Szczecin
- Area
  - 1997: 9,982 km^{2} (3,854 sq mi)
- Population
  - 1975: 853 700
  - 1997: 972 100
- Government
  - Type: Voivodeship
- Voivode
  - 1975–1980 (first): Jerzy Kuczyński
  - 1997–1998 (last): Władysław Lisewski
- History
  - Established: 1 June 1975
  - Disestablished: 31 December 1998
- Contained within
  - Country: Polish People's Republic (1975–1989) (Poland) Third Polish Republic (1989–1998)
- Political subdivisions: 54 gminas (1997)
Preceded by	Succeeded by
Szczecin Voivodeship	West Pomeranian Voivodeship

The Szczecin Voivodeship (Note: Polish: Województwo szczecińskie) was a voivodeship (province) of the Polish People's Republic from 1975 to 1989, and the Third Polish Republic from 1989 to 1998. Its capital was Szczecin, and it was centered on the western Farther Pomerania. It was established on 1 June 1975, from the part of the Szczecin Voivodeship, and existed until 31 December 1998, when it was incorporated into then-established West Pomeranian Voivodeship.

== History ==
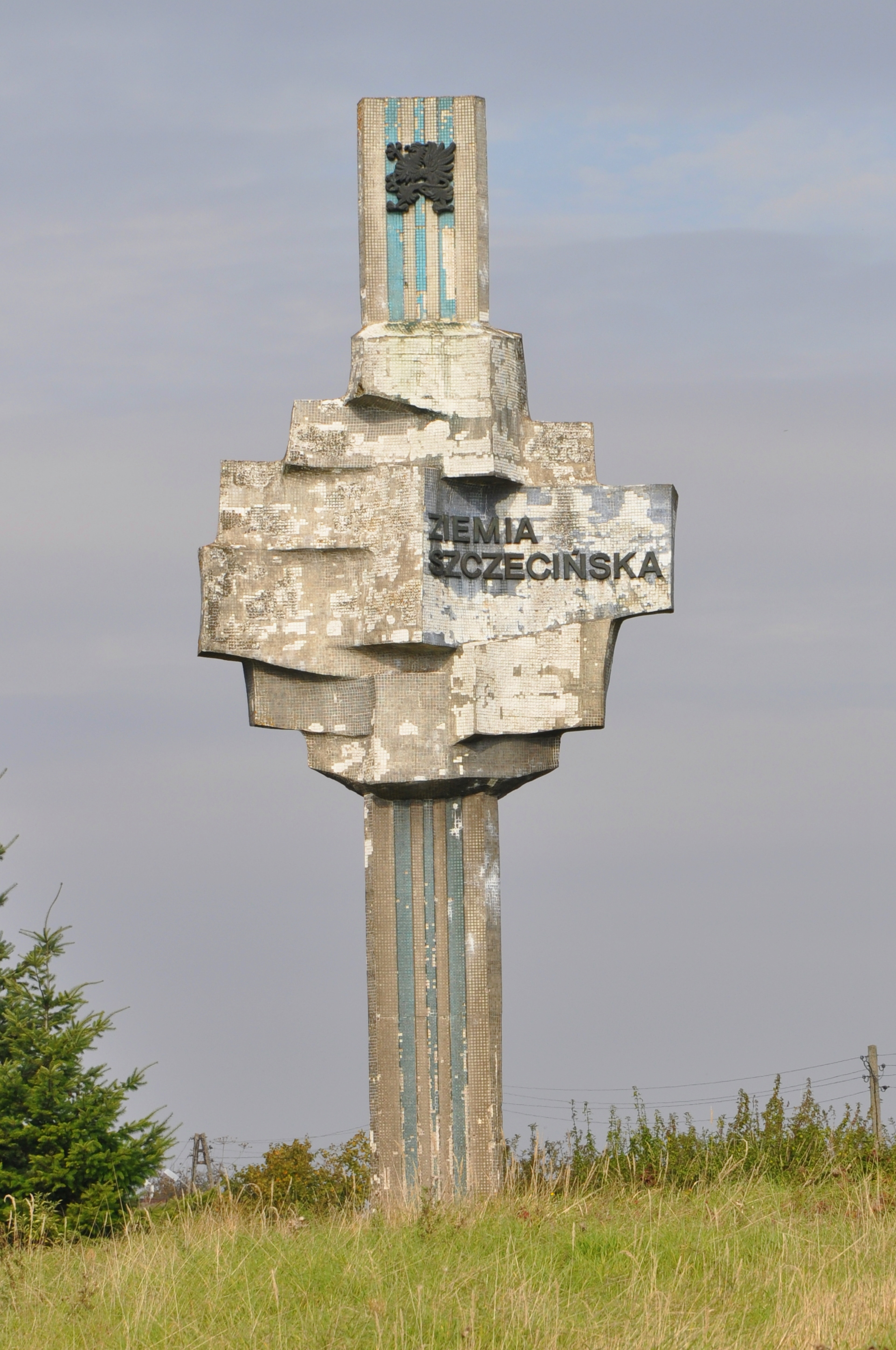
A welcome sign of Szczecin Voivodeship, located in Lipiany, at the boundary with Gorzów Voivodeship. The text on the sign said Szczecin Land.

The Szczecin Voivodeship was established on 1 June 1975, as part of the administrative reform, and was one of the voivodeships (provinces) of the Polish People's Republic. It was formed from the part of the territory of the Szczecin Voivodeship. Its capital was located in the city of Szczecin. In 1975, it was inhabited by 853 700 people. It bordered the Koszalin Voivodeship to the east, the Gorzów Voivodeship to the south, the East Germany to the west, which in 1990, was replaced by Germany, and the Baltic Sea to the north.

On 9 December 1989, the Polish People's Republic was replaced by the Third Polish Republic. In 1997, the voivodeship had a population of 995 100, and in 1998, it had an area of 9982 km^{2}. It existed until 31 December 1998, when it was incorporated into then-established West Pomeranian Voivodeship.

== Subdivisions ==
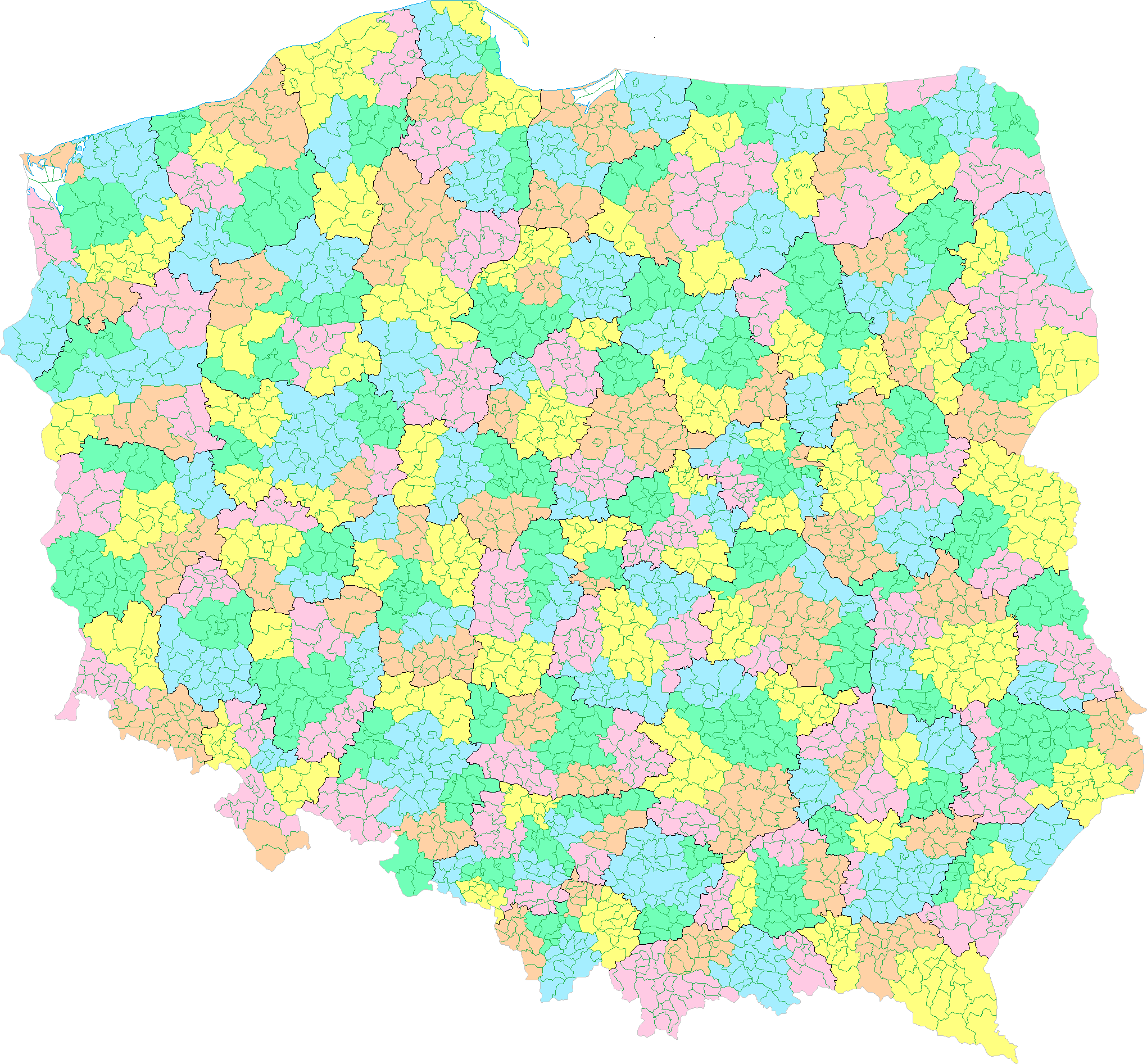
The district offices and gminas (municipalities) of Poland in 1998, including the Szczecin Voivodeship.

In 1997, the voivodeship was divided into 54 gminas (municipalities), including 3 urban municipalities, 28 urban-rural municipalities, and 31 rural municipalities. It had 31 towns and cities.

From 1990 to 1998, it was additionally divided into seven district offices, each comprising several municipalities.

== Demographics ==
=== Population ===
Year	Population
1975	853 700
1980	897 900
1985	942 600
1990	972 100
1995	990 500
1997	995 100

=== Settlements ===
In 1997, the voivodeship had 31 cities and towns. In 1998, the biggest cities and towns by population were:

- Szczecin (416 988);
- Stargard Szczeciński (73 753);
- Świnoujście (43 570);
- Police (35 100);
- Goleniów (22 621);
- Gryfino (22 435);
- Gryfice (18 037);
- Nowogard (17 309);
- Pyrzyce (13 247);
- Łobez (10 961);
- Trzebiatów (10 316).

== Leaders ==
The leader of the administrative division was the voivode. Those were:

- 1975–1980: Jerzy Kuczyński
- 1980: Henryk Kanicki
- 1980–1982: Tadeusz Waluszkiewicz
- 1982–1990: Stanisław Malec
- 1990–1997: Marek Tałasiewicz
- 1997–1998: Władysław Lisewski
