= Parzynów =

- Village
- Location within Poland
- Coordinates: 51°22′N 17°54′E
- Country: Poland
- Voivodeship: Greater Poland
- County: Ostrzeszów
- Gmina: Kobyla Góra
- Population: 670

Parzynów [paˈʐɨnuf] is a village in the administrative district of Gmina Kobyla Góra, within Ostrzeszów County, Greater Poland Voivodeship, in west-central Poland.
