= Central Cemetery, Szczecin =

Municipal cemetery in Szczecin, Poland

Central Cemetery in Szczecin
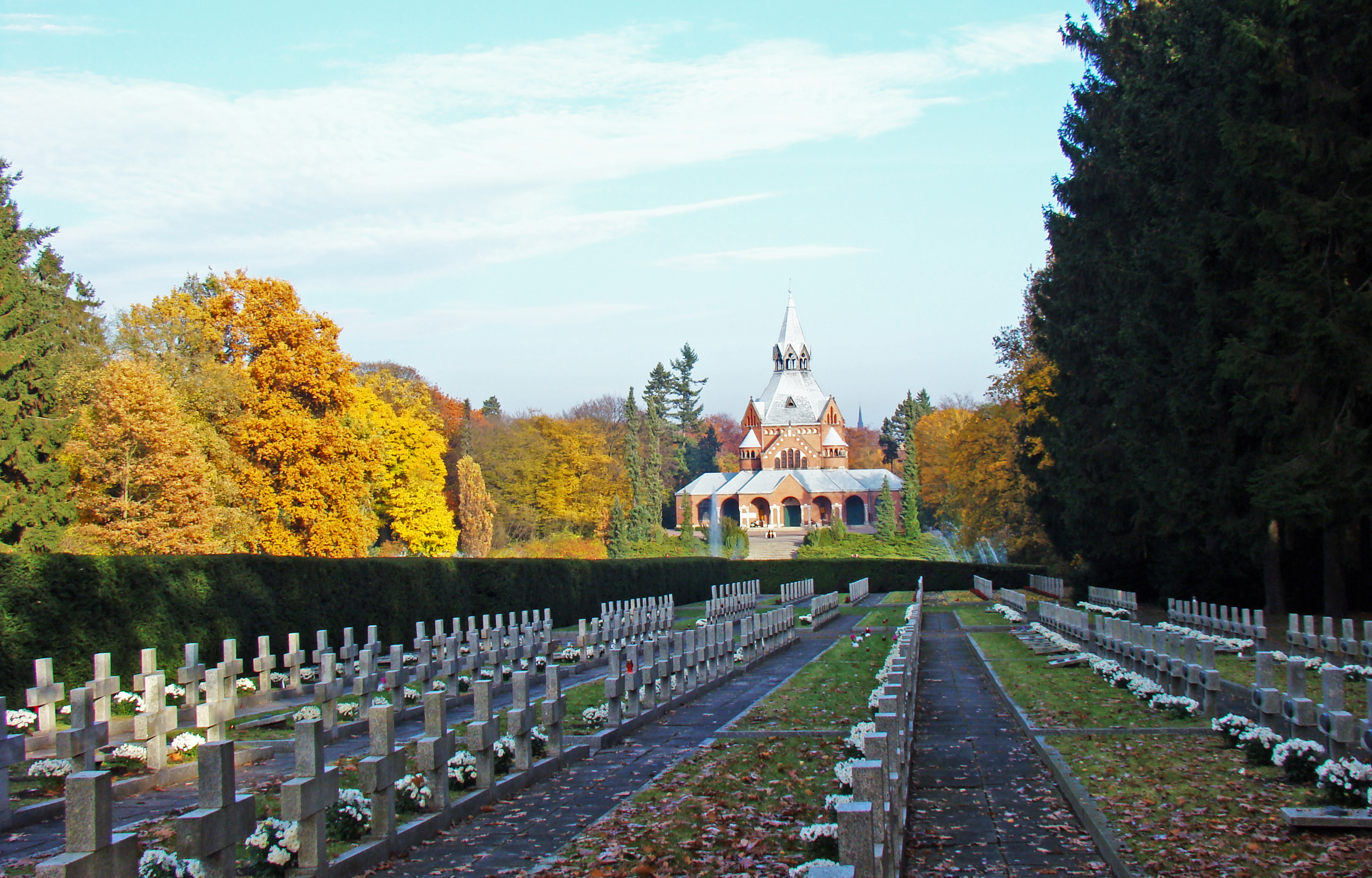
- Interactive map of Central Cemetery in Szczecin

Details
- Established: 1901
- Location: Szczecin
- Country: Poland
- Coordinates: 53°25′14″N 14°31′24″E
- Type: Public
- Size: 167.8 ha
- No. of graves: 300,000+
- Website: Website

The Central Cemetery in Szczecin is a municipal cemetery in Szczecin, Poland. With an area of over 167.8 hectares, and still expanding, it is officially the largest cemetery in Poland and the third largest in Europe.

== History ==
The Central Cemetery in Szczecin was established in 1901 as a new and modern cemetery in what was then Stettin in German Pomerania. It was formerly called the Hauptfriedhof Stettin (Stettin Main Cemetery) and was modeled on the Ohlsdorf Cemetery in Hamburg, Germany. Even though it has been operating for more than 100 years, it is still in use, and is a legally protected national monument.

The first part of the new cemetery was located in the fields on the eastern outskirts of the city. It was designed by Wilhelm Meyer-Schwartau, a prolific architect of Stettin. The composition of the greenery was designed by landscape architect Georg Hanning.

Wilhelm Meyer-Schwartau planned the layout of the new cemetery, and also designed a neo-romanesque central chapel and a monumental 77-meter-long main entrance gate. In total, there are eleven gates leading to the cemetery.

The Central Cemetery was intended as a picturesque park or memorial-garden. This goal was achieved through utilizing the natural features of the landscape. Most of the roads in the old part of the cemetery are curved and form a net of small circles. The main road, leading from the central gate to the central chapel, is flanked by old plane trees.

The main chapel was destroyed in the fire of 1981 and took 13 years to rebuild. In 1925, a crematory was constructed next to it. Today there is only one chapel in the cemetery, facing a big decorative pool with a fountain. It forms the main axis connecting the east and west parts of the cemetery.

The new – west part of the cemetery was created about 1930, on a site which had been used as a military training area. Most roads in this part of the cemetery are straight, running parallel to two natural streams which flow through the whole terrain. In this part of the cemetery in the 1930 there was also a chapel, modern in style, but it was demolished during the Second World War, and eventually pulled down in 1984. After Stettin became Polish in 1945 and was renamed Szczecin, the authorities rechristened the cemetery to its present Polish name.

On the site of the Central Cemetery, there are many places of historical interest, such as a lapidarium with old gravestones and grave sculptures, and an old windmill (today converted into a garden centre). One of the quarters houses graves of notable individuals, such as artists and politicians. There are also monuments devoted to veterans, people who died at sea, unborn fetuses and concentration camps victims.

== Monuments ==
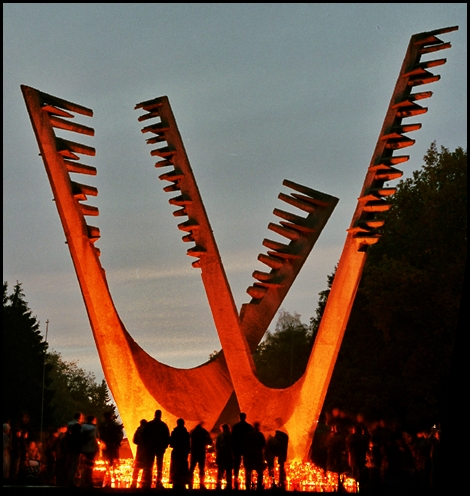
Pomnik Braterstwa Broni

The best known monument is Pomnik Braterstwa Broni (Monument of Brothers in Arms) made in 1967 and designed by Sławomir Lewiński. It is a military monument which looks like hussar wings. The monument is situated on the hill on the main axis. From this place there is a beautiful view on the main chapel.

The Central Cemetery in Szczecin is like a large park in the centre of the city, with many old trees of different types and tall hedges made of deciduous or coniferous shrubs. It is similar to a large botanical garden, although not everyone, even in Szczecin, is aware of this collection of trees and shrubs.

Some parts of the cemetery are very natural, there are thickets and meadows, especially the green belts located parallel to the streams. It is a very important ecological space for many little animals, birds and insects such as foxes, hares, hedgehogs, red squirrels, wilds ducks etc. In the cemetery there is also one educational board with photos of these wild animals and some information about them.

== Gallery ==
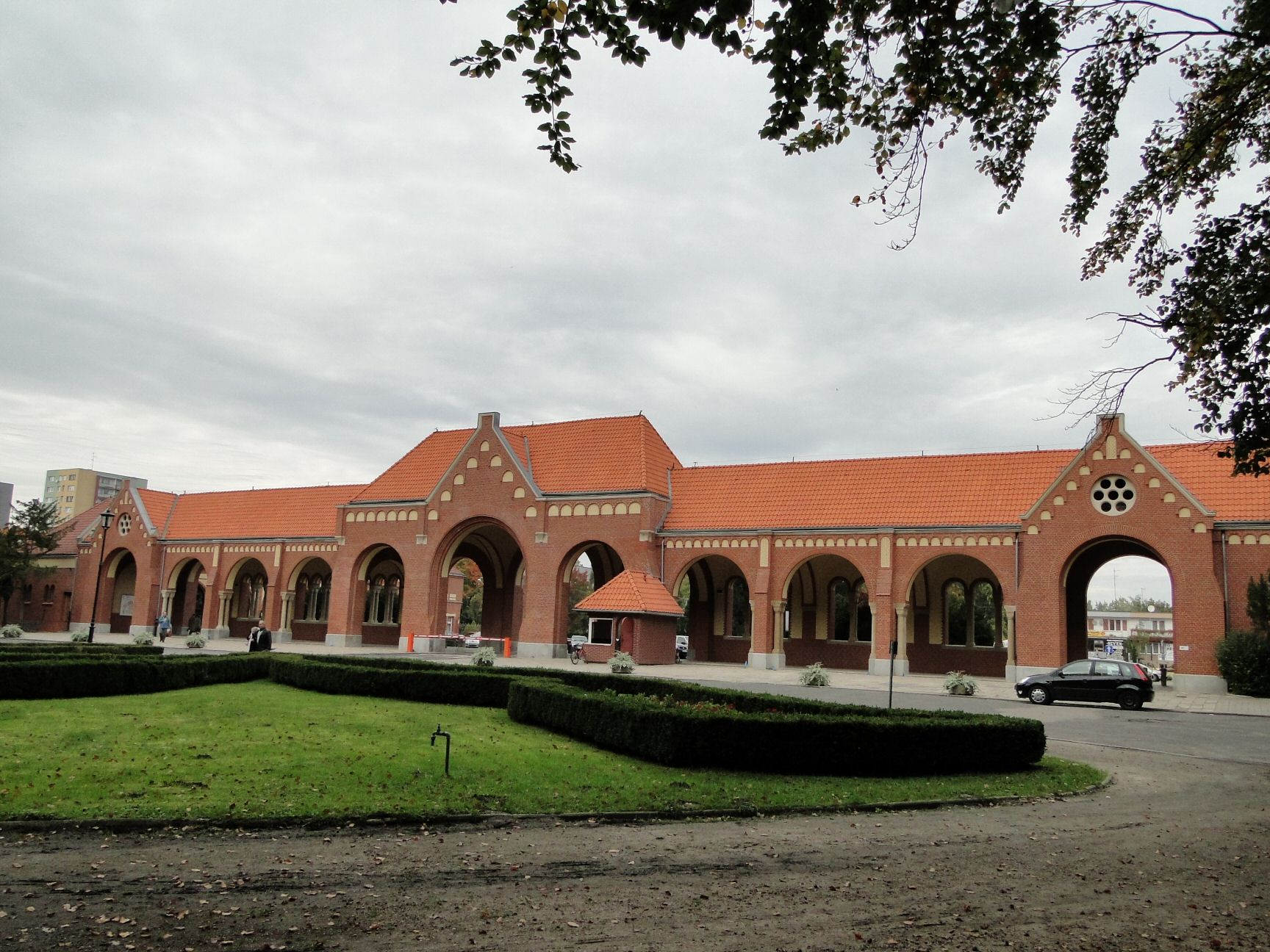

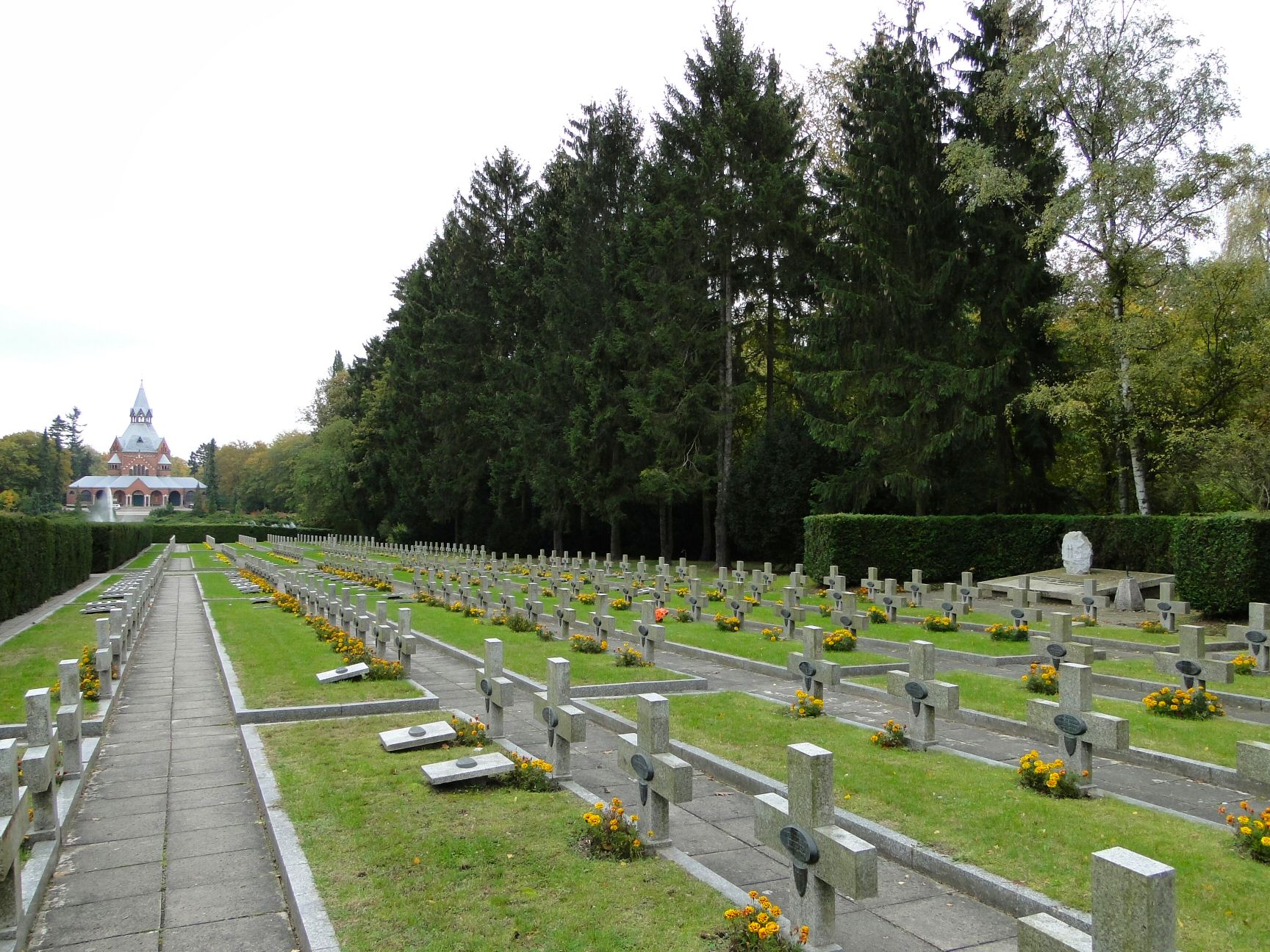

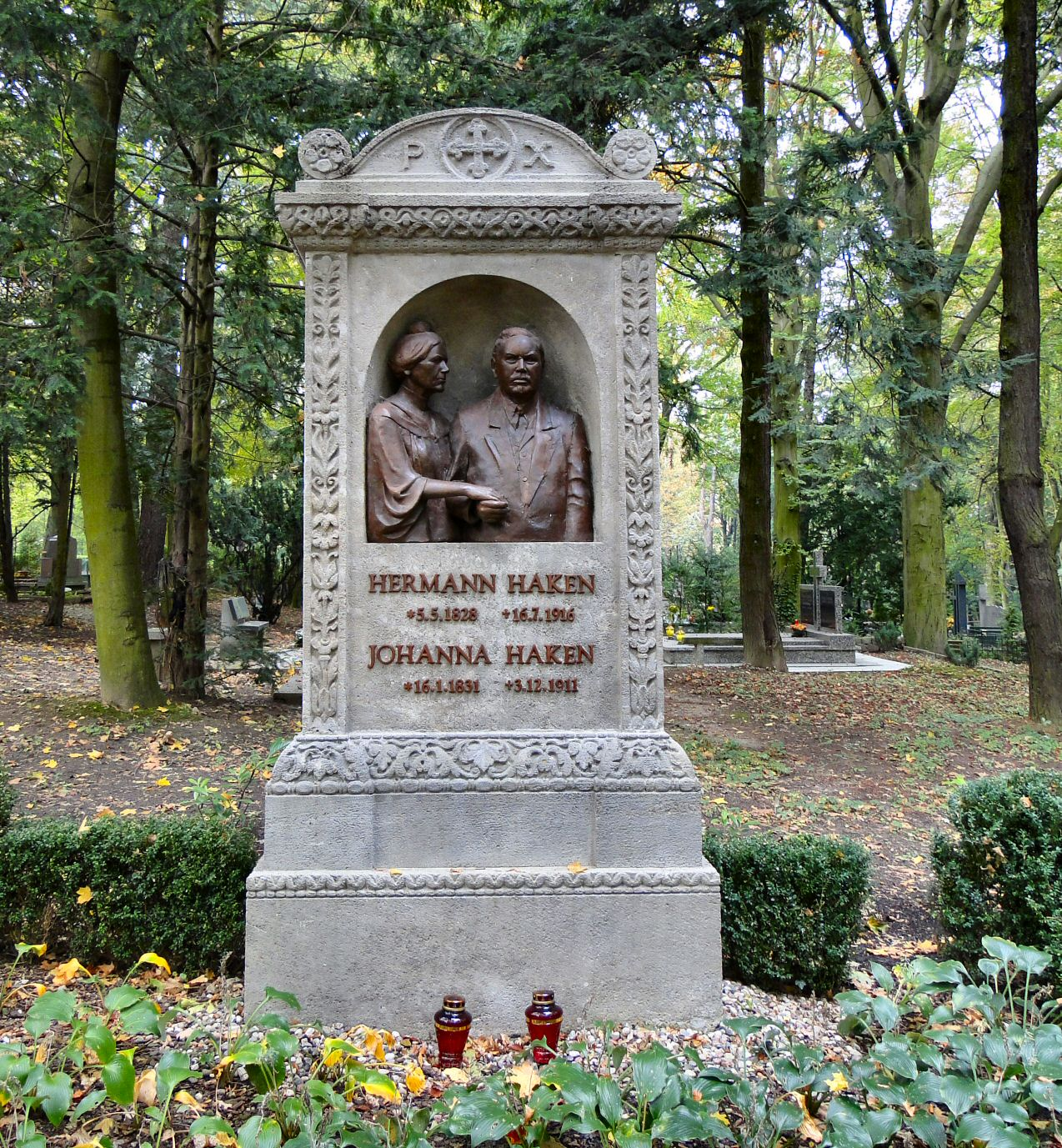

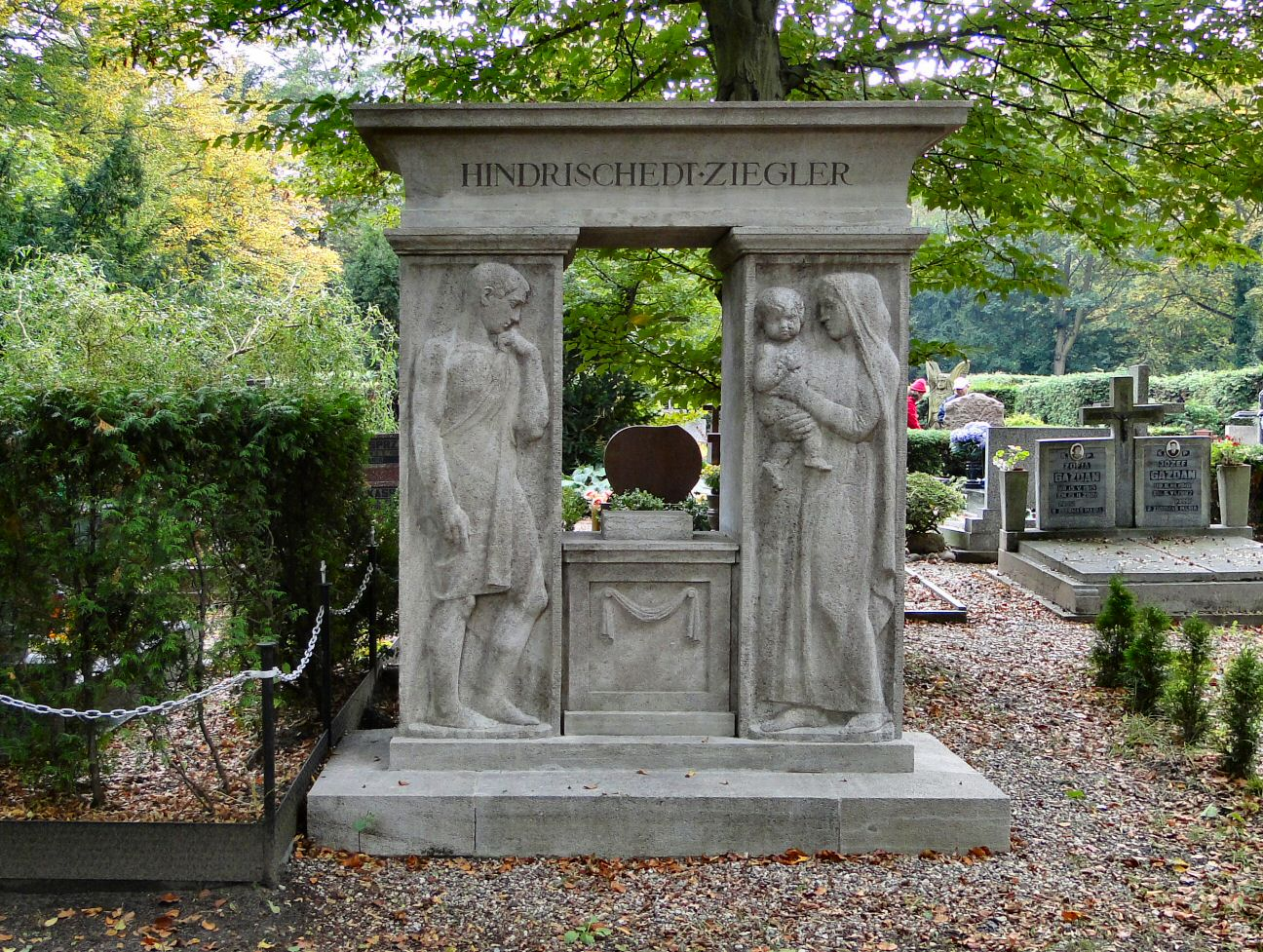

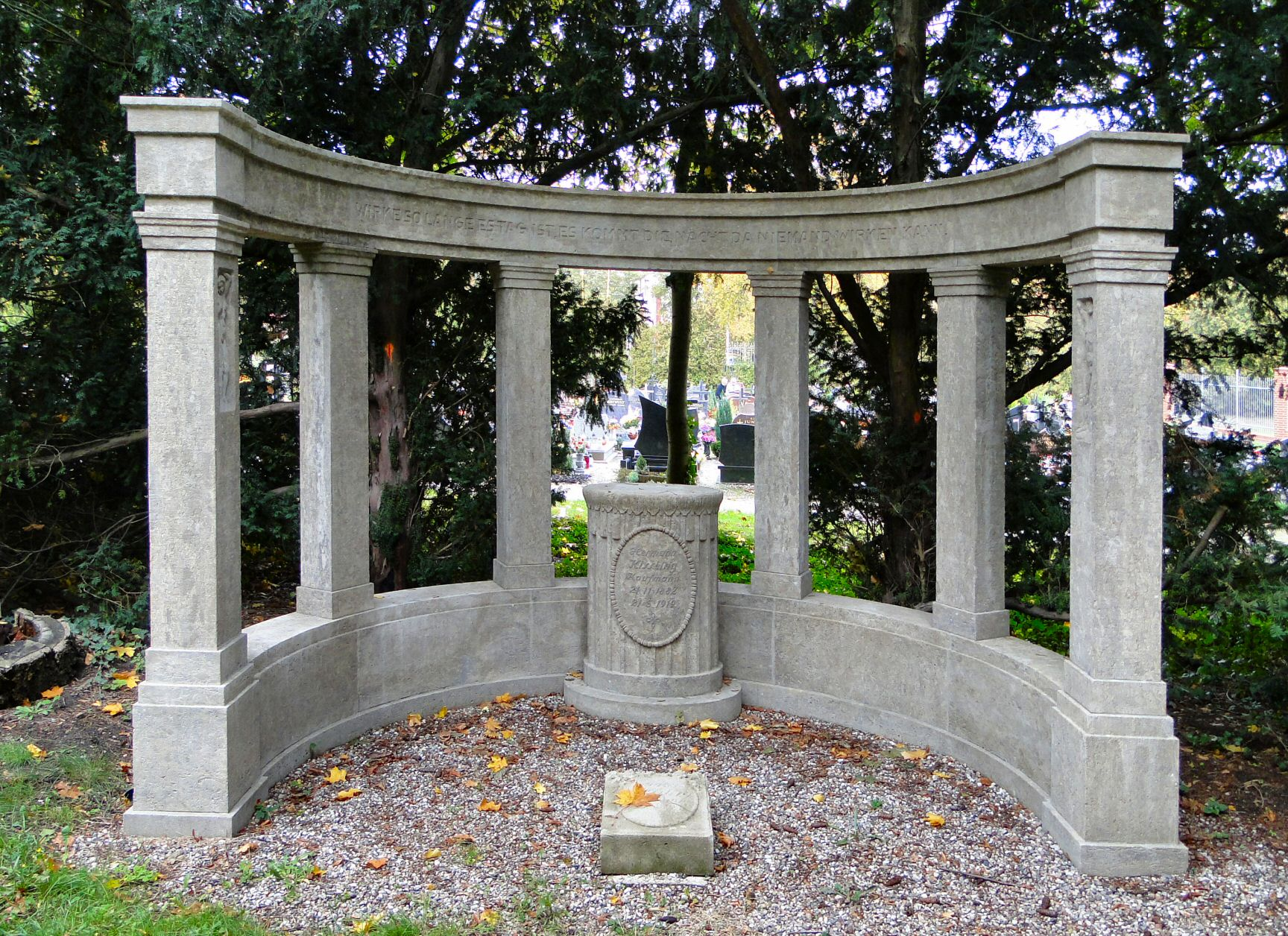

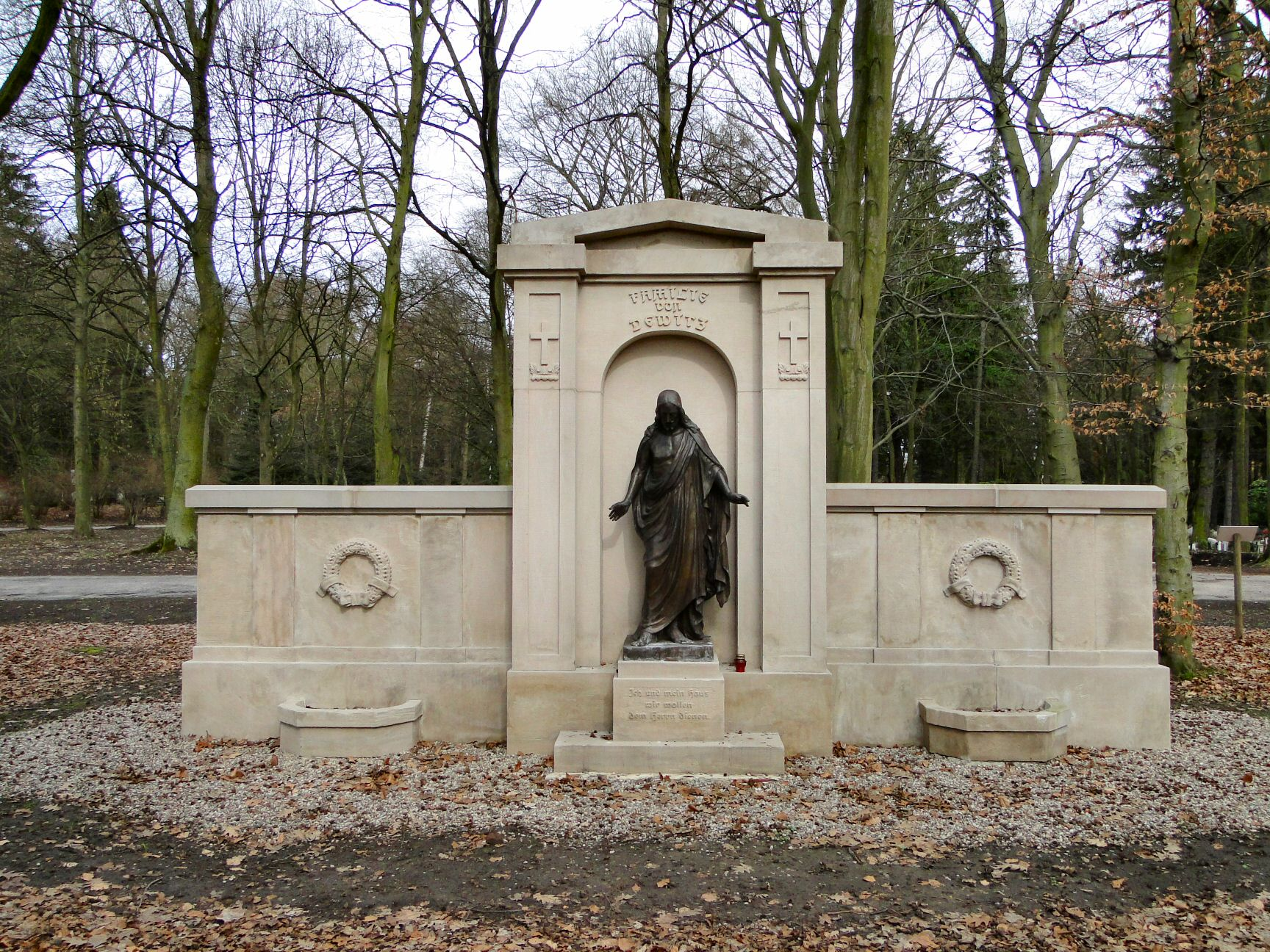

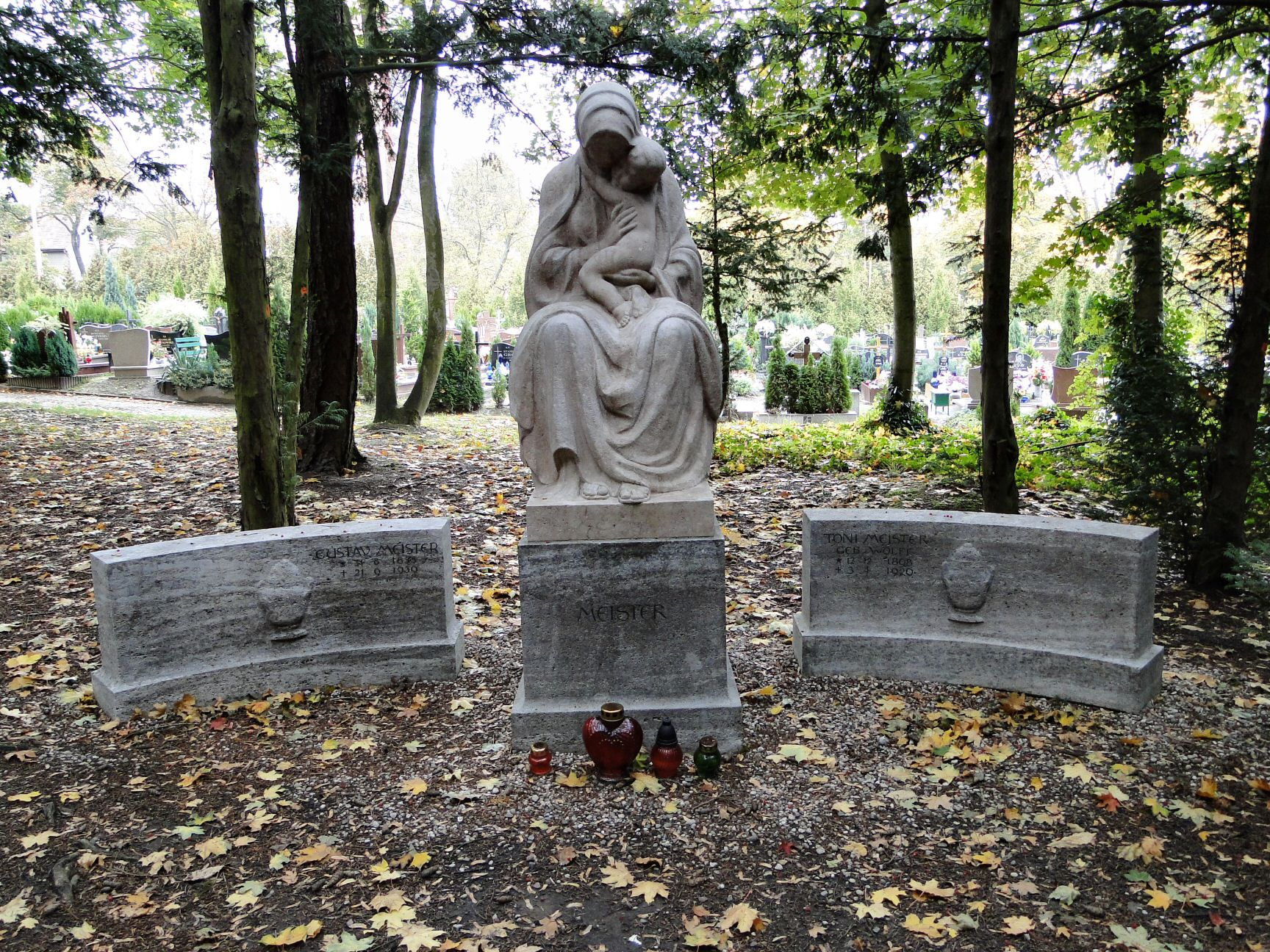

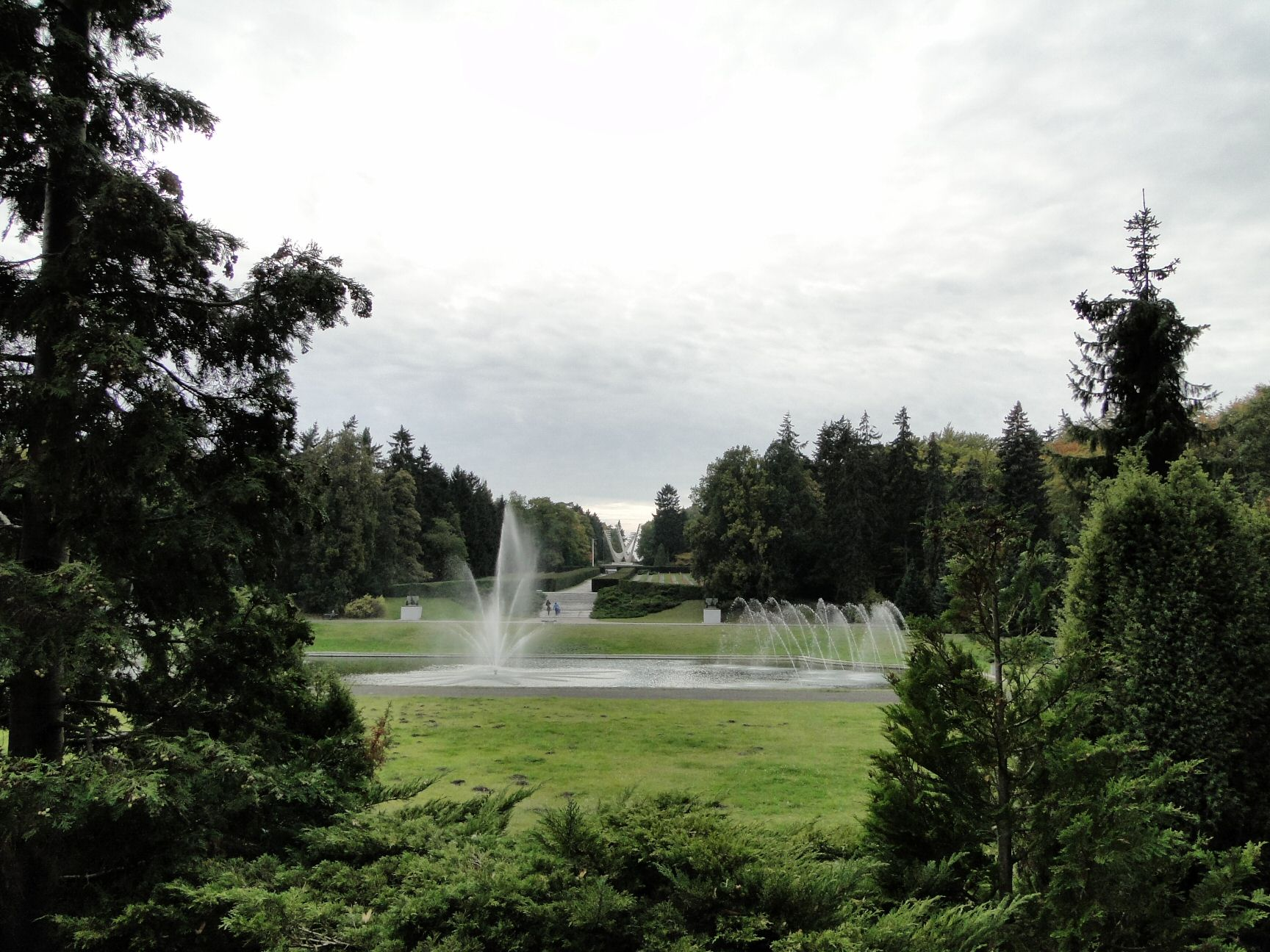
