= National Council (subdivision in Poland) =

Former local level of government in communist Poland

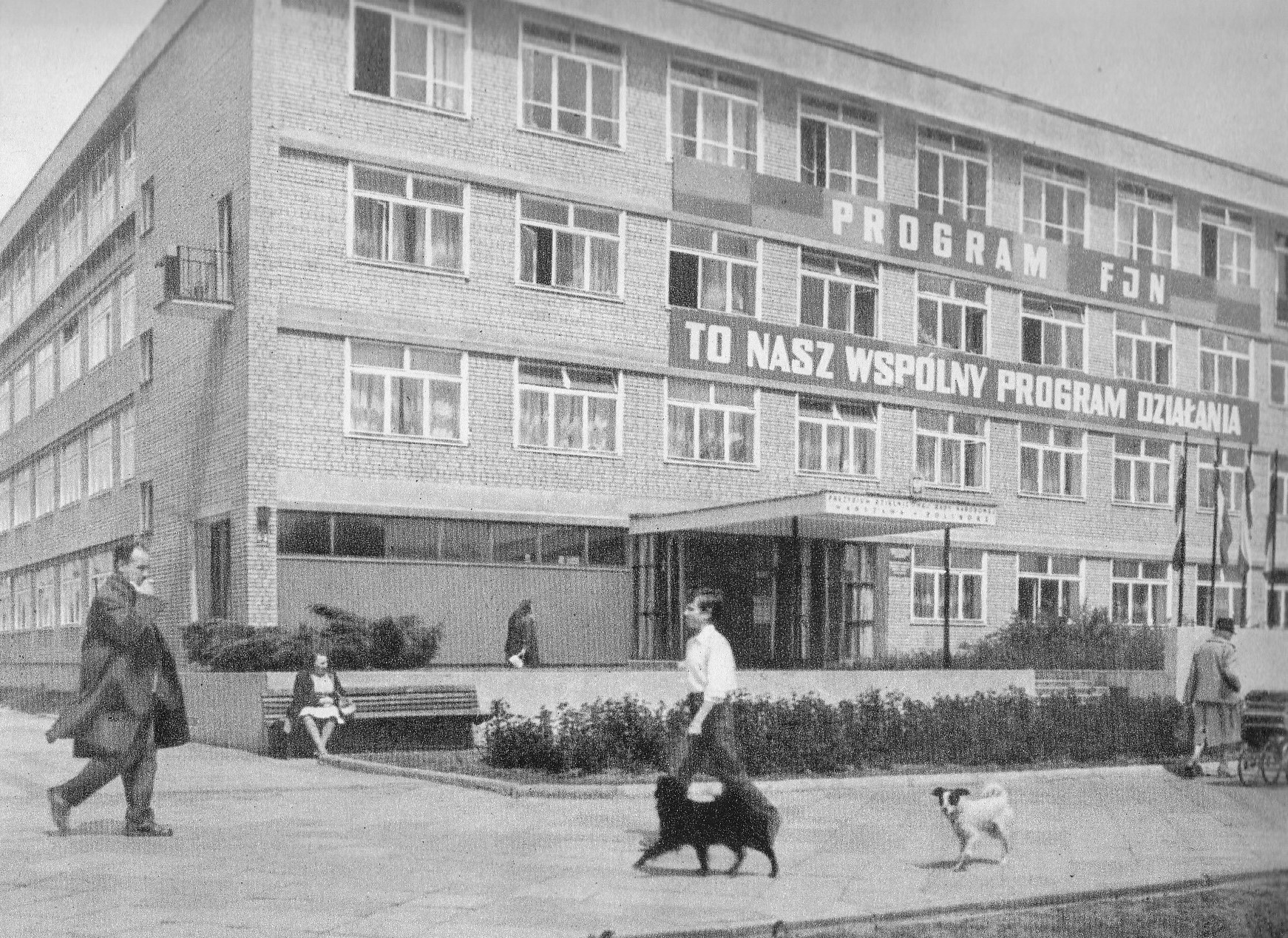
Seat of the Neighbourhood National Council of Żoliborz district of Warsaw, 1970.

National Council (Polish: Rada Narodowa) was a local level of government in People's Republic of Poland. Introduced by Polish Constitution of 1952, they were elected for a term of office of 3 years in gminas, cities (and some districts), powiats and voivodeships. National Councils had their own presidiums and were subordinate to higher-level National Councils. The National Councils were meant to give the communist government a facade of democracy. In fact the elections were non-free, and National Councils had little autonomy, being almost completely dependent on decisions of Polish United Workers' Party (PZPR).

The tasks of Voivodeship National Council (Polish: Wojewodzka Rada Narodowa; WRN) were to managing the public life of the Voivodeship, social control over the activities of the Voivode and performing the functions of local self-government of the second instance. It was only the Act on the organization and scope of operation of national councils that specified the competences of councils by granting them legislative functions of local government, planning public activities, determining the budget and benefit plan, controlling the activities of state and local executive bodies, and appointing self-government executive bodies. The composition of national councils was determined on the basis of delegating their representatives by trade unions, workers 'and workers' unions, craft and agricultural organizations, cooperative unions, industrial, trade, cultural and educational organizations as well as 2 representatives of poviat national councils. National councils elected from their members a presidium consisting of a chairman, his deputy and 3 members.

The crisis of 1956 brought criticism of the functioning of the national councils. However, there were no demands to restore local self-government. An attempt to extend the independence of national councils was the Act of January 25, 1958 on National Councils and its amendment of June 28, 1963. Councils could coordinate the intentions of centrally managed socialized economy units operating in their area. An obligation of participation of socialized economy units in the costs of construction of communal facilities was introduced. Subsidies for local budgets were replaced with shares in the revenues of the central budget. However, these reforms concerned only Voivodeship National Councils. On the other hand, all national councils were given the right to decide on matters that did not belong to the powers of other organs of power. The presidiums of the councils remained the executive and management body, they represented the council outside. The act of 1963 increased the role of commissions and sessions of national councils.

The Act of November 29, 1972 on the Establishment of Communes and Amending the Act on National Councils partly returned to the solutions from before 1950. The functions of representative bodies were separated from the functions of executive bodies. The presidiums of the people's councils became only organs directing the work of the council, they lost the character of an executive and managing body. They became an internal body of the council, directing its activities and its chairman represented only the presidium and council, not the executive branch. The presidium consisted of: the chairman of the commune national council, his deputies and the chairman standing council committees.

In 1973 he Politburo of the Central Committee of the Polish United Workers' Party determined that the first secretaries of the voivodeship committees of the Polish United Workers' Party (PZPR) would serve as chairmen of the presidium of the voivodeship national councils would.

The Act of 20 July 1983 on the System of National Councils and Local Government amended albeit in a minor way the powers and tasks of the National Council, however, they did not obtain property and financial separation. Rural and urban communes were still users of private property. They had no independent income. They continued to use the provincial or central budget. Therefore, the councils could not have the financial resources to meet the needs of the residents. Provincial National Councils decided on investments in towns and communes. The councils continued to play the role of organs of state power. The National Council Presidiums were still the governing bodies of these councils, subordinated to them and accountable to them, only that the function of chairman of the presidium was no longer reserved exclusively for persons with the status of party members. Their legal position, however, was strengthened by the act through decisive participation in the process of appointing voivodes, equipping them with powers over all bodies performing the tasks of the voivodeship national council and organizational units subordinated to it, including the possibility of providing the voivode with guidelines in the form of resolutions. The Act of 16 June 1988 amending the Act on the system of national councils and local government still did not ensure independent management for cities and communes. The budget of the commune depended on the decision of the tax office regarding the amount of subsidies and shares in the income of the central budget, as well as the right to freely dispose of funds.

== See also ==
- Soviet (council)
