= Zunz =

Zunz (Hebrew: צוּנְץ, Yiddish: צונץ) is a Yiddish surname:

- Edgard Zunz (1874–1939), Belgian pharmacologist
- Sir Gerhard Jack Zunz (1923–2018), British civil engineer
- Leopold Zunz (Yom Tov Lipmann Tzuntz) (1794–1886), German Reform rabbi and writer, the founder of academic Judaic Studies (Wissenschaft des Judentums)
- Olivier Zunz (born 1946), social historian

== Zuntz ==
- Alexander Zuntz, signatory of Buttonwood Agreement
- Günther Zuntz (1902–1992), German-English classical philologist
- Heinrich Zuntz, founder of Odeon Records
- Leonie Zuntz (1908–1942), German Hittitologist
- Nathan Zuntz (1847–1920), German physiologist
- Rachel Zuntz (1787–1874), German businessperson

== See also ==
- Emma Zunz, short story by Jorge Luis Borges
- Zastań (German: Zünz), a village in the Gmina Wolin, Kamień County, Poland
- Nyingchi Mainling Airport, an airport with ICAO code ZUNZ
