= Świętouść =

- Settlement
- Location within Poland
- Coordinates: 53°59′N 14°38′E
- Country: Poland
- Voivodeship: West Pomeranian
- County: Kamień
- Gmina: Wolin

Świętouść (Polish: [ɕfjɛnˈtɔ.uɕt͡ɕ]; German: Swantuss) is a settlement in the administrative district of Gmina Wolin, within Kamień County, West Pomeranian Voivodeship, in north-western Poland. It lies approximately 16 km (10 mi) north of Wolin, 11 km (7 mi) west of Kamień Pomorski, and 63 km (39 mi) north of the regional capital Szczecin.
