= Parłowo =

- Settlement
- Location within Poland
- Coordinates: 53°50′0″N 14°45′2″E
- Country: Poland
- Voivodeship: West Pomeranian
- County: Kamień
- Gmina: Wolin

Parłowo [parˈwɔvɔ] (German: Parlowkrug) is a settlement in the administrative district of Gmina Wolin, within Kamień County, West Pomeranian Voivodeship, in north-western Poland. It lies approximately 10 km (6 mi) east of Wolin, 16 km (10 mi) south of Kamień Pomorski, and 48 km (30 mi) north of the regional capital Szczecin.
