= Strzegowo, West Pomeranian Voivodeship =

Strzegowo
- Village
- Location within Poland
- Coordinates: 53°49′N 14°46′E
- Country: Poland
- Voivodeship: West Pomeranian
- County: Kamień
- Gmina: Wolin

Strzegowo [stʂɛˈɡɔvɔ] (German Stregow) is a village in the administrative district of Gmina Wolin, within Kamień County, West Pomeranian Voivodeship, in north-western Poland. It lies approximately 11 km (7 mi) east of Wolin, 18 km (11 mi) south of Kamień Pomorski, and 46 km (29 mi) north of the regional capital Szczecin.
