= Jarzębowo =

- Village
- Location within Poland
- Coordinates: 53°54′33″N 14°38′41″E
- Country: Poland
- Voivodeship: West Pomeranian
- County: Kamień
- Gmina: Wolin
- Population: 70

Jarzębowo [jaʐɛmˈbɔvɔ] (German: Jarmbow) is a village in the administrative district of Gmina Wolin, within Kamień County, West Pomeranian Voivodeship, in north-western Poland. It lies approximately 8 km (5 mi) north of Wolin, 12 km (7 mi) south-west of Kamień Pomorski, and 55 km (34 mi) north of the regional capital Szczecin.

The village has a population of 70.
