= Wolin Smock Mill =

Mill in Kamień County, West Pomeranian Voivodeship, Poland

Smock mill
- Wiatrak holenderski (Polish)
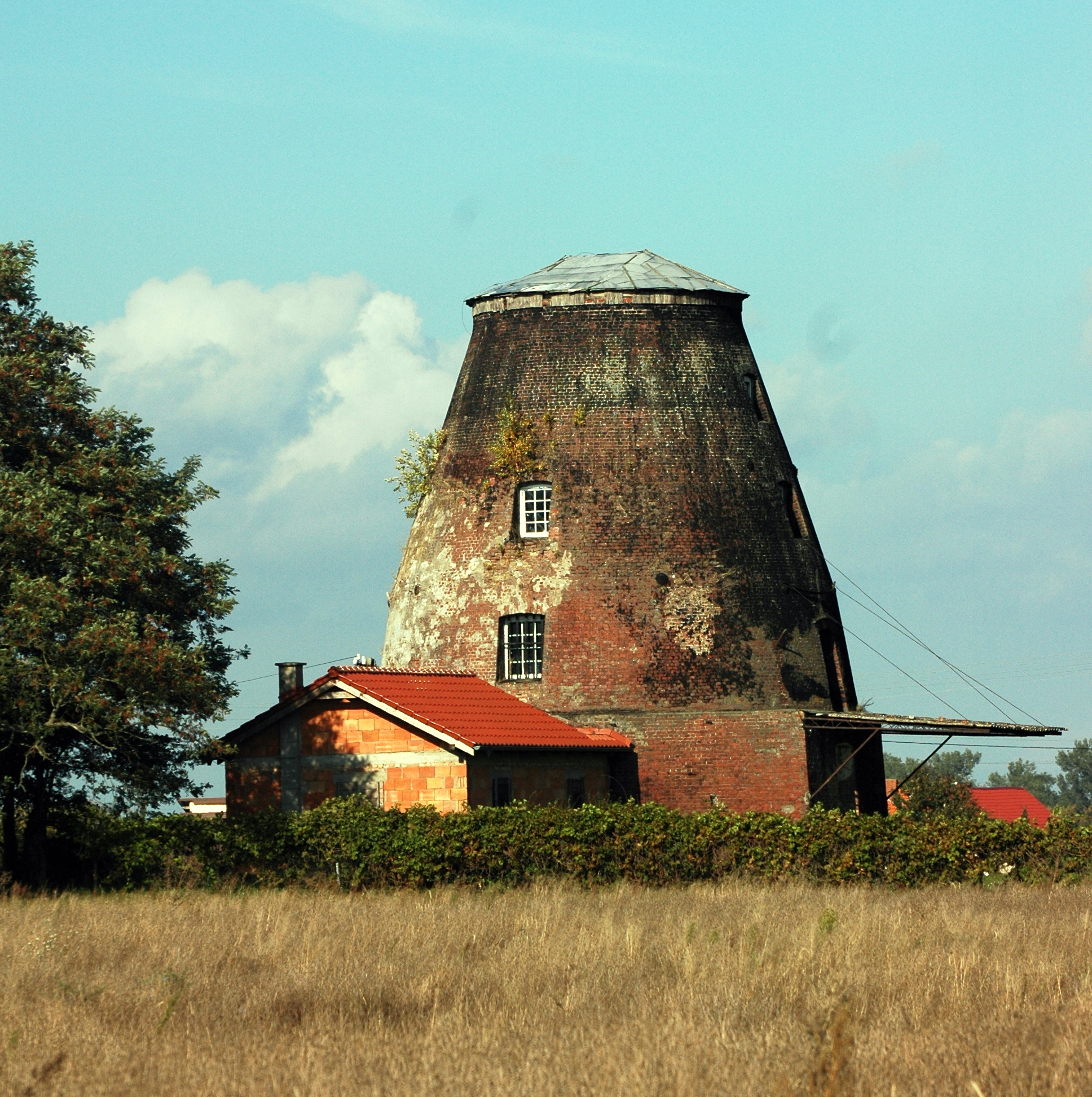
- Smock mill, Wolin in 2022.

- Location within Poland

General information
- Location: Wolin, Poland
- Coordinates: 53°50′30″N 14°21′21.02″E
- Completed: 1850

Technical details
- Floor count: 3

Wolin Smock Mill (Polish: wiatrak holenderski w Wolinie) is a smock mill in the town of Wolin in the Kamień County, West Pomeranian Voivodeship, Poland. It is located in the eastern part of the town near the commentary, at the Jaracza Street. It is registered as an object of cultural heritage.

Mill was built in 1850. It has 3 consignations and has circular base. Currently it acts as an industrial mill.
