= Ładzin, West Pomeranian Voivodeship =

Ładzin
- Village
- Location within Poland
- Coordinates: 53°54′N 14°34′E
- Country: Poland
- Voivodeship: West Pomeranian
- County: Kamień
- Gmina: Wolin
- Population: 340

Ładzin [ˈwad͡ʑin] (German: Rehberg) is a village in the administrative district of Gmina Wolin, within Kamień County, West Pomeranian Voivodeship, in north-western Poland. It lies approximately 8 km (5 mi) north-west of Wolin, 17 km (11 mi) south-west of Kamień Pomorski, and 54 km (34 mi) north of the regional capital Szczecin.

For the history of the region, see History of Pomerania.

The village has a population of 340.
