= Ostromice =

- Village
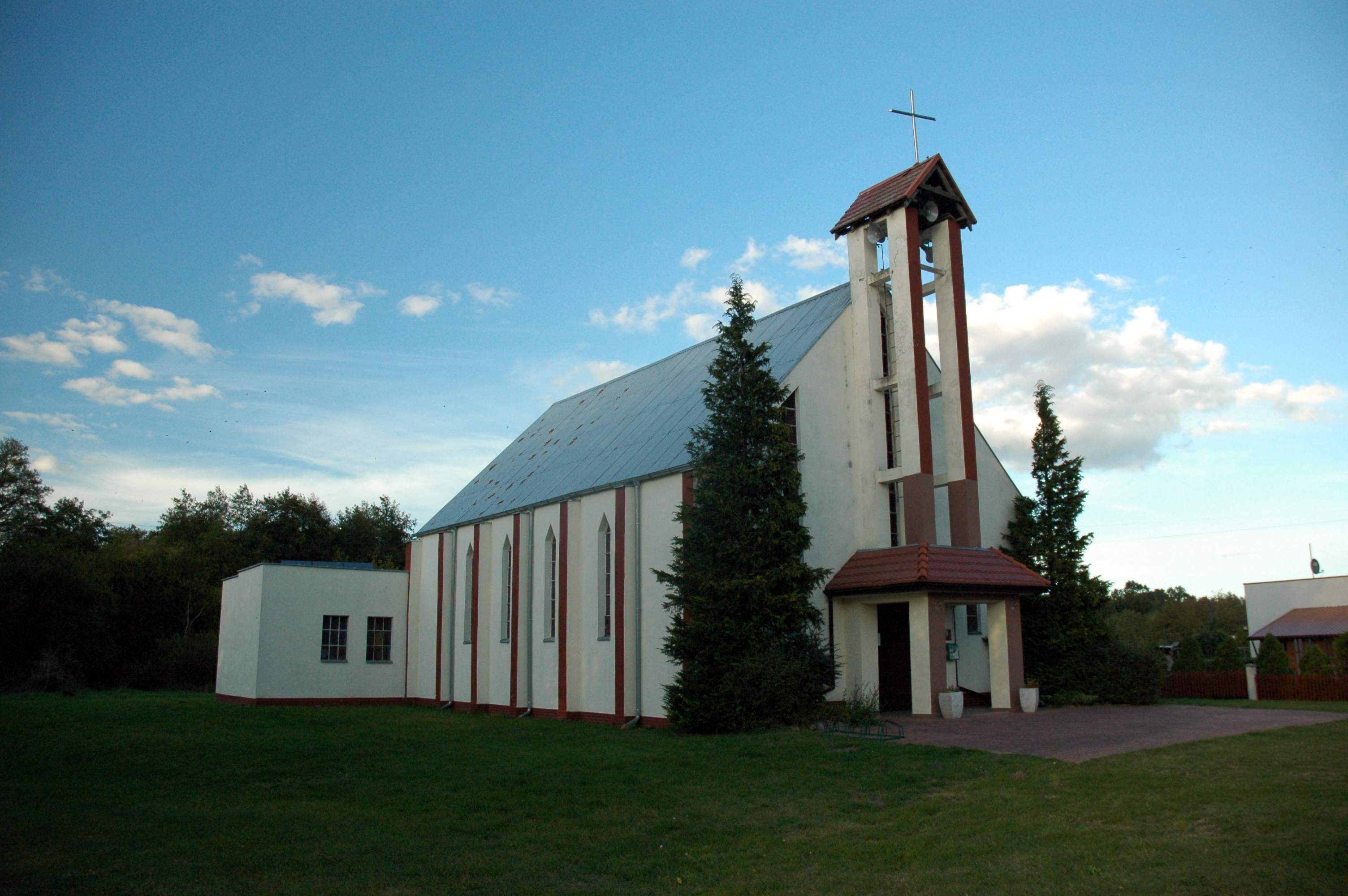
- Holy Cross church in Ostromice

- Location within Poland
- Coordinates: 53°49′N 14°45′E
- Country: Poland
- Voivodeship: West Pomeranian
- County: Kamień
- Gmina: Wolin

Population
  - Total: 490

Ostromice [ɔstrɔˈmit͡sɛ] (German: Wustermitz) is a village in the administrative district of Gmina Wolin, within Kamień County, West Pomeranian Voivodeship, in north-western Poland. It lies approximately 10 km (6 mi) east of Wolin, 18 km (11 mi) south of Kamień Pomorski, and 46 km (29 mi) north of the regional capital Szczecin.

The village has a population of 490.

During World War II, the German Nazi government operated a forced labour subcamp of the Stalag II-D prisoner-of-war camp in the village.
