= Rabiąż =

- Village
- Location within Poland
- Coordinates: 53°55′N 14°34′E
- Country: Poland
- Voivodeship: West Pomeranian
- County: Kamień
- Gmina: Wolin
- Population: 40

Rabiąż [ˈrabjɔ̃ʂ] (German: Fernosfelde) is a village in the administrative district of Gmina Wolin, within Kamień County, West Pomeranian Voivodeship, in northwestern Poland. It lies approximately 9 km (6 mi) north of Wolin, 16 km (10 mi) west of Kamień Pomorski, and 56 km (35 mi) north of the regional capital Szczecin.

The village has a population of 40.

== See also ==
- History of Pomerania
