= Sułomino =

- Village
- Location within Poland
- Coordinates: 53°51′N 14°32′E
- Country: Poland
- Voivodeship: West Pomeranian
- County: Kamień
- Gmina: Wolin
- Population: 20

Sułomino [suwɔˈminɔ] (formerly German: Soldemin) is a village in the administrative district of Gmina Wolin, within Kamień County, West Pomeranian Voivodeship, in north-western Poland. It lies approximately 6 km (4 mi) west of Wolin, 22 km (14 mi) south-west of Kamień Pomorski, and 49 km (30 mi) north of the regional capital Szczecin.

The village has a population of 20.
