= Jagienki =

- Village
- Location within Poland
- Coordinates: 53°53′N 14°33′E
- Country: Poland
- Voivodeship: West Pomeranian
- County: Kamień
- Gmina: Wolin
- Population: 30

Jagienki [jaˈɡʲɛnki] is a village in the administrative district of Gmina Wolin, within Kamień County, West Pomeranian Voivodeship, in north-western Poland. It lies approximately 7 km (4 mi) north-west of Wolin, 19 km (12 mi) south-west of Kamień Pomorski, and 52 km (32 mi) north of the regional capital Szczecin.

The village has a population of 30.
