= Łuskowo =

- Village
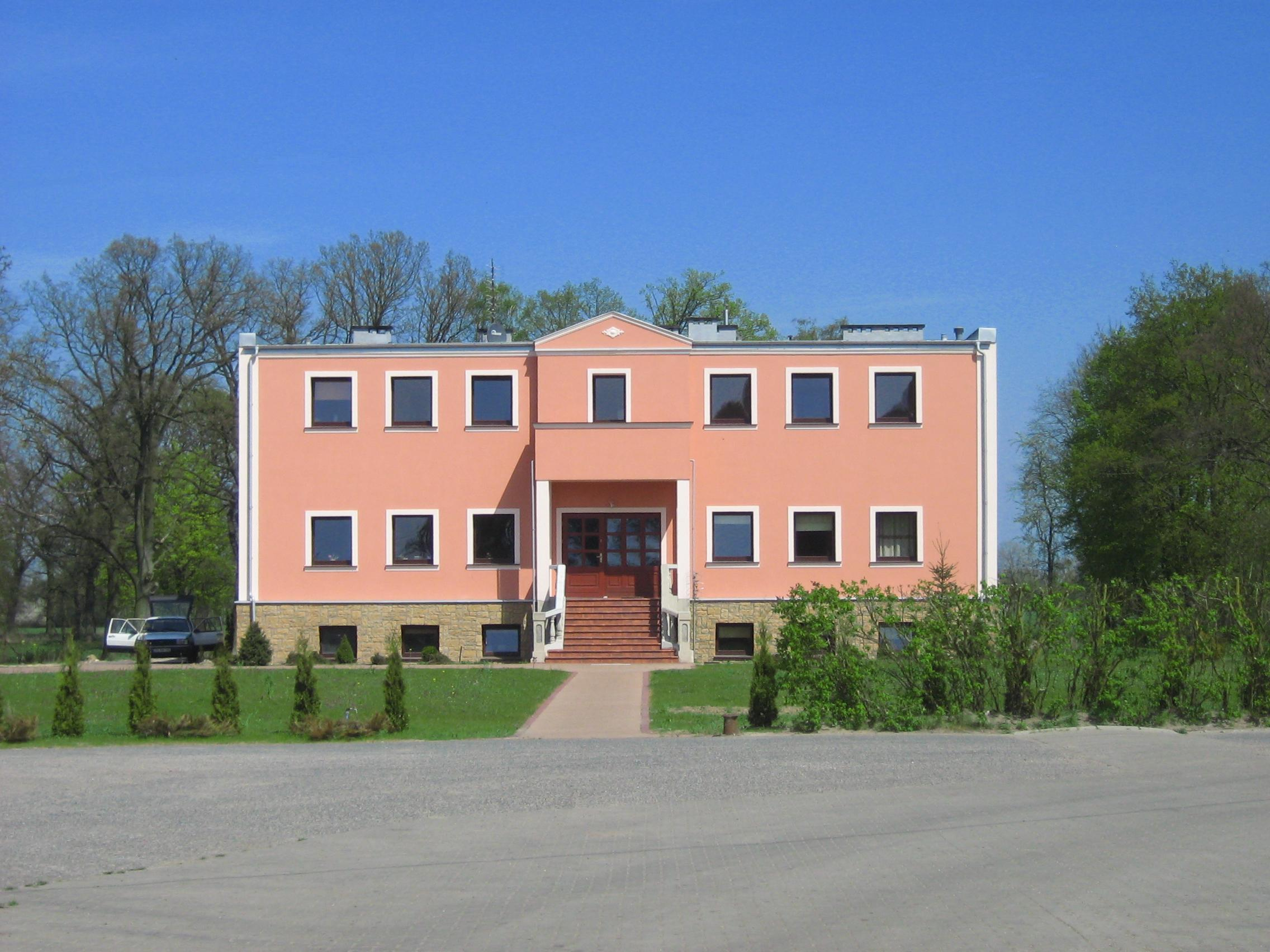

- Location within Poland
- Coordinates: 53°55′N 14°40′E
- Country: Poland
- Voivodeship: West Pomeranian
- County: Kamień
- Gmina: Wolin

Population
  - Total: 200
- Time zone: UTC+1 (CET)
  - Summer (DST): UTC+2 (CEST)
- Vehicle registration: ZKA

Łuskowo [wusˈkɔvɔ] is a village in the administrative district of Gmina Wolin, within Kamień County, West Pomeranian Voivodeship, in north-western Poland. It lies approximately 10 km (6 mi) north-east of Wolin, 10 km (6 mi) south-west of Kamień Pomorski, and 56 km (35 mi) north of the regional capital Szczecin.

The village has a population of 200.

Two Polish citizens were murdered by Nazi Germany in the village during World War II.
