= Troszyn, Kamień County =

Troszyn
- Village
- Location within Poland
- Coordinates: 53°50′N 14°42′E
- Country: Poland
- Voivodeship: West Pomeranian
- County: Kamień
- Gmina: Wolin
- Population: 200

Troszyn [ˈtrɔʂɨn] (German: Alt Tessin) is a village in the administrative district of Gmina Wolin, within Kamień County, West Pomeranian Voivodeship, in north-western Poland. It lies approximately 6 km (4 mi) east of Wolin, 17 km (11 mi) south of Kamień Pomorski, and 47 km (29 mi) north of the regional capital Szczecin.

The village has a population of 200.
