= Wiejkówko =

- Village
- Location within Poland
- Coordinates: 53°48′N 14°40′E
- Country: Poland
- Voivodeship: West Pomeranian
- County: Kamień
- Gmina: Wolin

Wiejkówko [vjɛi̯ˈkufkɔ] (German Klein Weckow) is a village in the administrative district of Gmina Wolin, within Kamień County, West Pomeranian Voivodeship, in northwestern Poland. It lies approximately 6 km (4 mi) southeast of Wolin, 21 km (13 mi) southwest of Kamień Pomorski, and 43 km (27 mi) north of the regional capital Szczecin.
