= Chynowo =

- Village
- Location within Poland
- Coordinates: 53°57′N 14°39′E
- Country: Poland
- Voivodeship: West Pomeranian
- County: Kamień
- Gmina: Wolin
- Population: 120

Chynowo [xɨˈnɔvɔ] (German Chinnow) is a village in the administrative district of Gmina Wolin, within Kamień County, West Pomeranian Voivodeship, in north-western Poland. It lies approximately 13 km (8 mi) north of Wolin, 10 km (6 mi) west of Kamień Pomorski, and 60 km (37 mi) north of the regional capital Szczecin.

The village has a population of 120.
