= Dobropole, Kamień County =

Dobropole
- Village
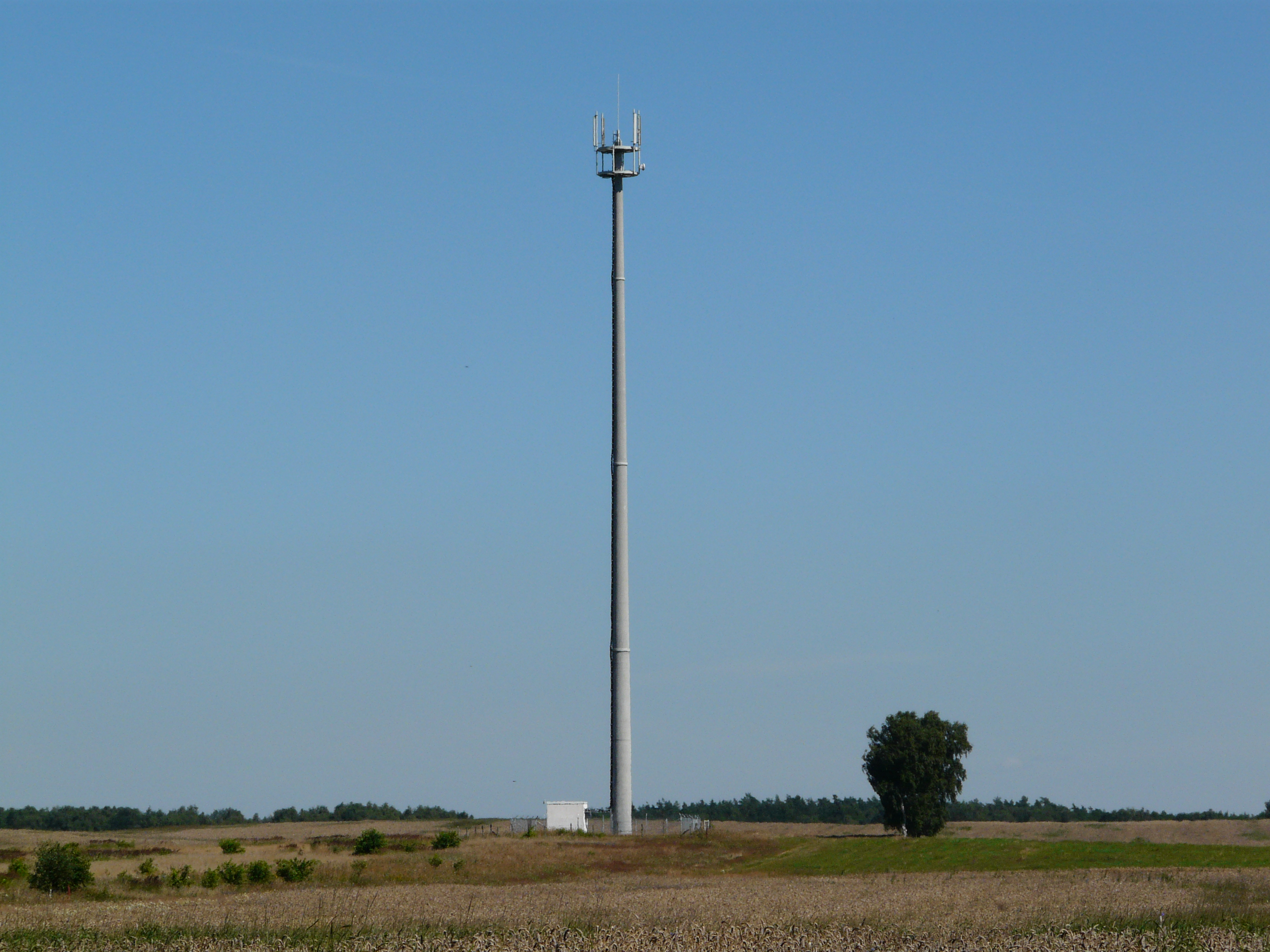

- Location within Poland
- Coordinates: 53°51′N 14°45′E
- Country: Poland
- Voivodeship: West Pomeranian
- County: Kamień
- Gmina: Wolin

Population
  - Total: 160
- Time zone: UTC+1 (CET)
  - Summer (DST): UTC+2 (CEST)
- Vehicle registration: ZKA

Dobropole [dɔbrɔˈpɔlɛ] is a village in the administrative district of Gmina Wolin, within Kamień County, West Pomeranian Voivodeship, in north-western Poland. It lies approximately 10 km (6 mi) east of Wolin, 14 km (9 mi) south of Kamień Pomorski, and 50 km (31 mi) north of the regional capital Szczecin.

The village has a population of 160.

During World War II, in February 1945, a German-perpetrated death march of Allied prisoners-of-war from the Stalag XX-B POW camp passed through the village.
