= Troszynek =

- Village
- Location within Poland
- Coordinates: 53°50′N 14°43′E
- Country: Poland
- Voivodeship: West Pomeranian
- County: Kamień
- Gmina: Wolin
- Population: 60

Troszynek [trɔˈʂɨnɛk] is a village in the administrative district of Gmina Wolin, within Kamień County, West Pomeranian Voivodeship, in north-western Poland. It lies approximately 7 km (4 mi) east of Wolin, 16 km (10 mi) south of Kamień Pomorski, and 48 km (30 mi) north of the regional capital Szczecin.

The village has a population of 60.
