= Darzowice =

- Village
- Location within Poland
- Coordinates: 53°52′N 14°37′E
- Country: Poland
- Voivodeship: West Pomeranian
- County: Kamień
- Gmina: Wolin
- Population: 40

Darzowice [daʐɔˈvit͡sɛ] (German Darsewitz) is a village in the administrative district of Gmina Wolin, within Kamień County, West Pomeranian Voivodeship, in north-western Poland. It lies approximately 3 km (2 mi) north of Wolin, 16 km (10 mi) south-west of Kamień Pomorski, and 50 km (31 mi) north of the regional capital Szczecin.

The village has a population of 40.
