= Rekowo, Gmina Wolin =

Rekowo
- Village
- Location within Poland
- Coordinates: 53°58′N 14°39′E
- Country: Poland
- Voivodeship: West Pomeranian
- County: Kamień
- Gmina: Wolin
- Population: 30

Rekowo [rɛˈkɔvɔ] (German Reckow) is a village in the administrative district of Gmina Wolin, within Kamień County, West Pomeranian Voivodeship, in north-western Poland. It lies approximately 15 km (9 mi) north of Wolin, 9 km (6 mi) west of Kamień Pomorski, and 62 km (39 mi) north of the regional capital Szczecin.

The village has a population of 30.
