= Siniechowo =

- Village
- Location within Poland
- Coordinates: 53°47′N 14°39′E
- Country: Poland
- Voivodeship: West Pomeranian
- County: Kamień
- Gmina: Wolin
- Population: 70

Siniechowo [ɕiɲɛˈxɔvɔ] (German Schinchow) is a village in the administrative district of Gmina Wolin, within Kamień County, West Pomeranian Voivodeship, in north-western Poland. It lies approximately 7 km (4 mi) south of Wolin, 23 km (14 mi) south-west of Kamień Pomorski, and 41 km (25 mi) north of the regional capital Szczecin.

The village has a population of 70.
