= Domysłów =

- Village
- Location within Poland
- Coordinates: 53°56′N 14°35′E
- Country: Poland
- Voivodeship: West Pomeranian
- County: Kamień
- Gmina: Wolin
- Population: 200

Domysłów [dɔˈmɨswuf] (German: Dannenberg) is a village in the administrative district of Gmina Wolin, within Kamień County, West Pomeranian Voivodeship, in north-western Poland. It lies approximately 11 km (7 mi) north of Wolin, 14 km (9 mi) west of Kamień Pomorski, and 58 km (36 mi) north of the regional capital Szczecin.

The village has a population of 200.
