= Dramino =

- Village
- Location within Poland
- Coordinates: 53°52′N 14°41′E
- Country: Poland
- Voivodeship: West Pomeranian
- County: Kamień
- Gmina: Wolin

Dramino [draˈminɔ] (German Drammin) is a village in the administrative district of Gmina Wolin, within Kamień County, West Pomeranian Voivodeship, in north-western Poland. It lies approximately 6 km (4 mi) north-east of Wolin, 14 km (9 mi) south-west of Kamień Pomorski, and 51 km (32 mi) north of the regional capital Szczecin.
