= Łojszyno =

- Village
- Location within Poland
- Coordinates: 53°57′N 14°41′E
- Country: Poland
- Voivodeship: West Pomeranian
- County: Kamień
- Gmina: Wolin

Łojszyno [wɔi̯ˈʂɨnɔ] (German Leussin) is a village in the administrative district of Gmina Wolin, within Kamień County, West Pomeranian Voivodeship, in north-western Poland. It lies approximately 13 km (8 mi) north of Wolin, 8 km (5 mi) west of Kamień Pomorski, and 60 km (37 mi) north of the regional capital Szczecin.
