= Jagniątkowo =

- Settlement
- Location within Poland
- Coordinates: 53°49′44″N 14°39′29″E
- Country: Poland
- Voivodeship: West Pomeranian
- County: Kamień
- Gmina: Wolin

Jagniątkowo [jaɡɲɔntˈkɔvɔ] is a settlement in the administrative district of Gmina Wolin, within Kamień County, West Pomeranian Voivodeship, in north-western Poland. It lies approximately 4 km (2 mi) south-east of Wolin, 18 km (11 mi) south-west of Kamień Pomorski, and 46 km (29 mi) north of the regional capital Szczecin.
