= Wisełka =

- Village
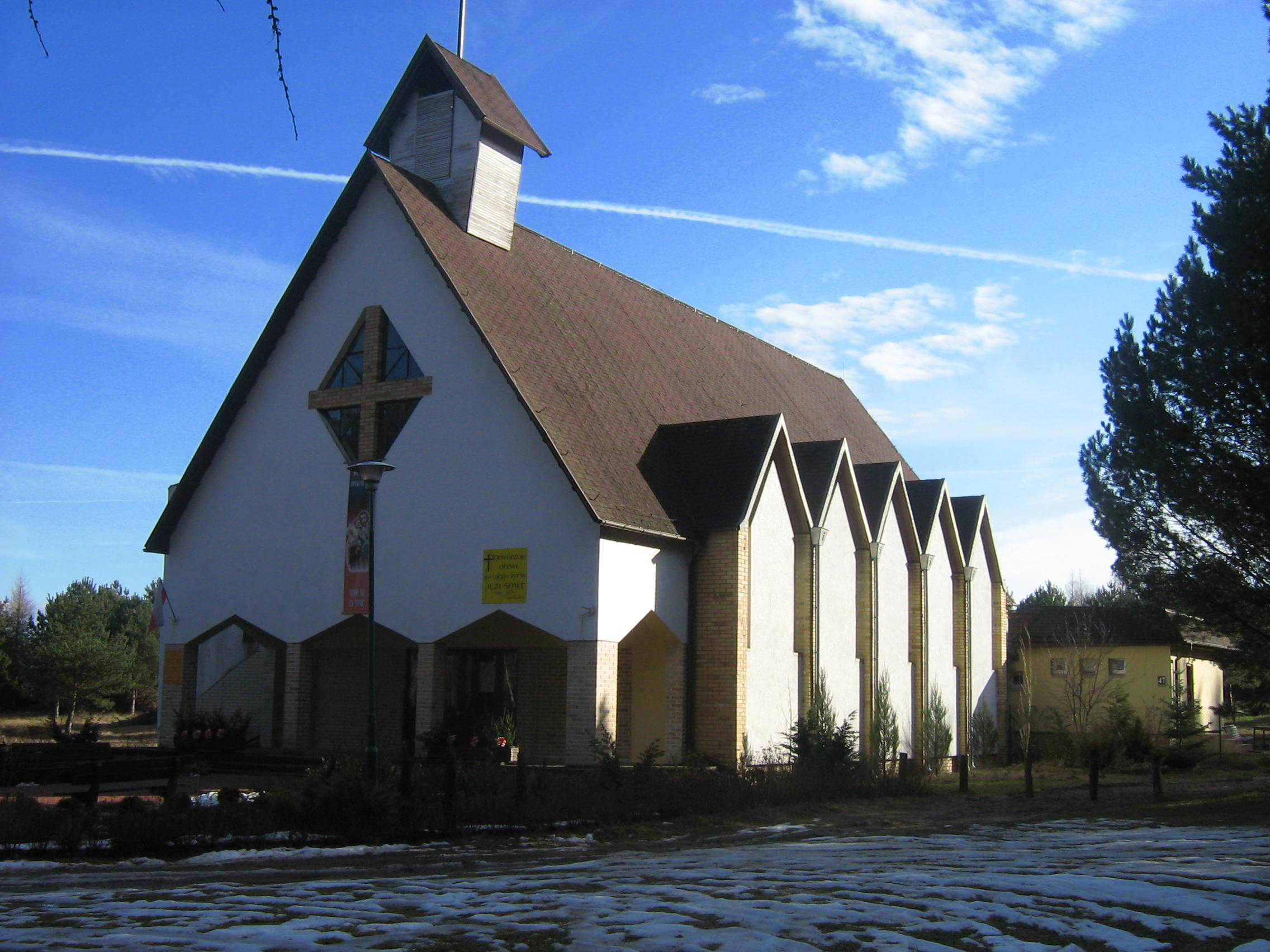
- Local church

- Location within Poland
- Coordinates: 53°57′N 14°34′E
- Country: Poland
- Voivodeship: West Pomeranian
- County: Kamień
- Gmina: Wolin
- Population (2006): 480
- Postal code: 72-514 Kołczewo
- Area code: +48 91
- Website: www.wiselka.info.pl

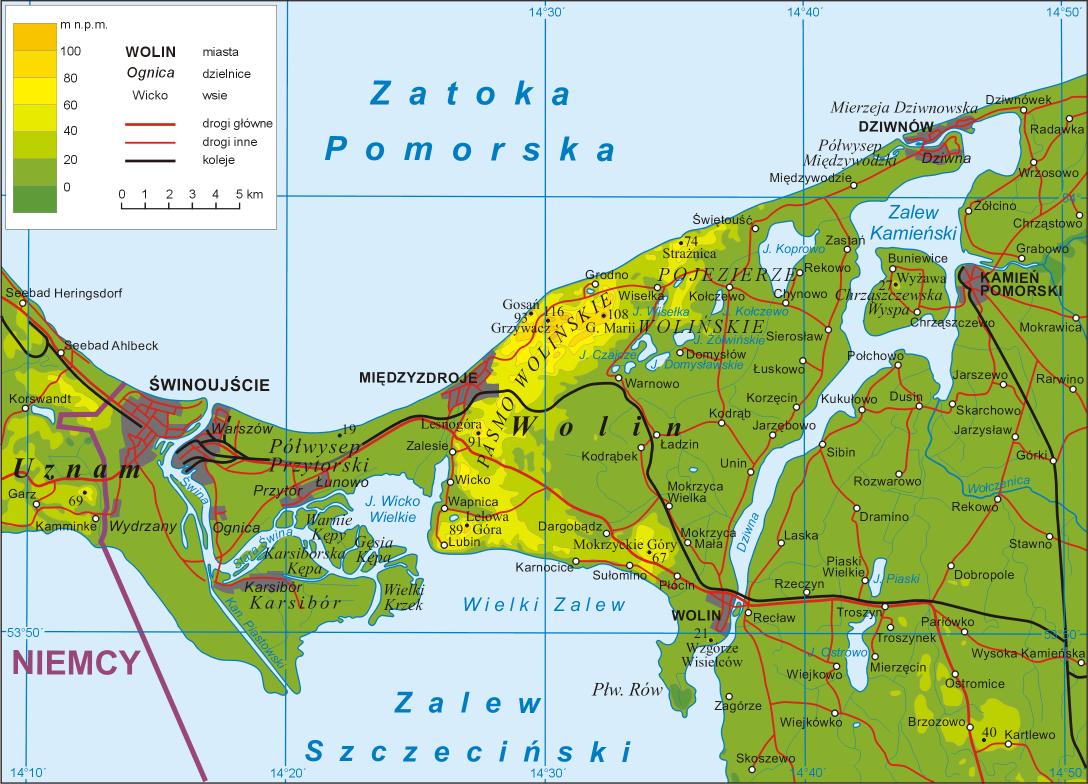
Map of the island of Wolin

Wisełka [viˈsɛu̯ka] (German Neuendorf) is a village in the administrative district of Gmina Wolin, within Kamień County, West Pomeranian Voivodeship, in north-western Poland. It lies on Wolin Island, approximately 13 km (8 mi) north of the town of Wolin, 15 km (9 mi) west of Kamień Pomorski, and 60 km (37 mi) north of the regional capital Szczecin.

As of 2006 the village has a population of 480.
