= Rzeczyn, West Pomeranian Voivodeship =

Rzeczyn
- Village
- Location within Poland
- Coordinates: 53°50′N 14°39′E
- Country: Poland
- Voivodeship: West Pomeranian
- County: Kamień
- Gmina: Wolin
- Population: 180

Rzeczyn [ˈʐɛt͡ʂɨn] (German: Reetzenhagen) is a village in the administrative district of Gmina Wolin, within Kamień County, West Pomeranian Voivodeship, in north-western Poland. It lies approximately 3 km (2 mi) east of Wolin, 18 km (11 mi) south-west of Kamień Pomorski, and 47 km (29 mi) north of the regional capital Szczecin.

The village has a population of 180.
