= Korzęcin =

- Village
- Location within Poland
- Coordinates: 53°55′N 14°39′E
- Country: Poland
- Voivodeship: West Pomeranian
- County: Kamień
- Gmina: Wolin
- Population: 60

Korzęcin (Polish pronunciation: [kɔˈʐɛnt͡ɕin]; German: Körtenthin; until 1937: Cörtenthin) is a village in the administrative district of Gmina Wolin, within Kamień County, West Pomeranian Voivodeship, in north-western Poland. It lies approximately 9 km (6 mi) north of Wolin, 11 km (7 mi) south-west of Kamień Pomorski, and 56 km (35 mi) north of the regional capital Szczecin.

The village has a population of 60.
