= Kodrąb, West Pomeranian Voivodeship =

Kodrąb
- Village
- Location within Poland
- Coordinates: 53°54′N 14°36′E
- Country: Poland
- Voivodeship: West Pomeranian
- County: Kamień
- Gmina: Wolin
- Population: 130

Kodrąb [ˈkɔdrɔmp] (formerly German: Codram, 1937-45: Kodram) is a village in the administrative district of Gmina Wolin, within Kamień County, West Pomeranian Voivodeship, in north-western Poland. It lies approximately 7 km (4 mi) north of Wolin, 15 km (9 mi) south-west of Kamień Pomorski, and 54 km (34 mi) north of the regional capital Szczecin.

The village has a population of 130.
