= Skoszewo, West Pomeranian Voivodeship =

Skoszewo
- Village
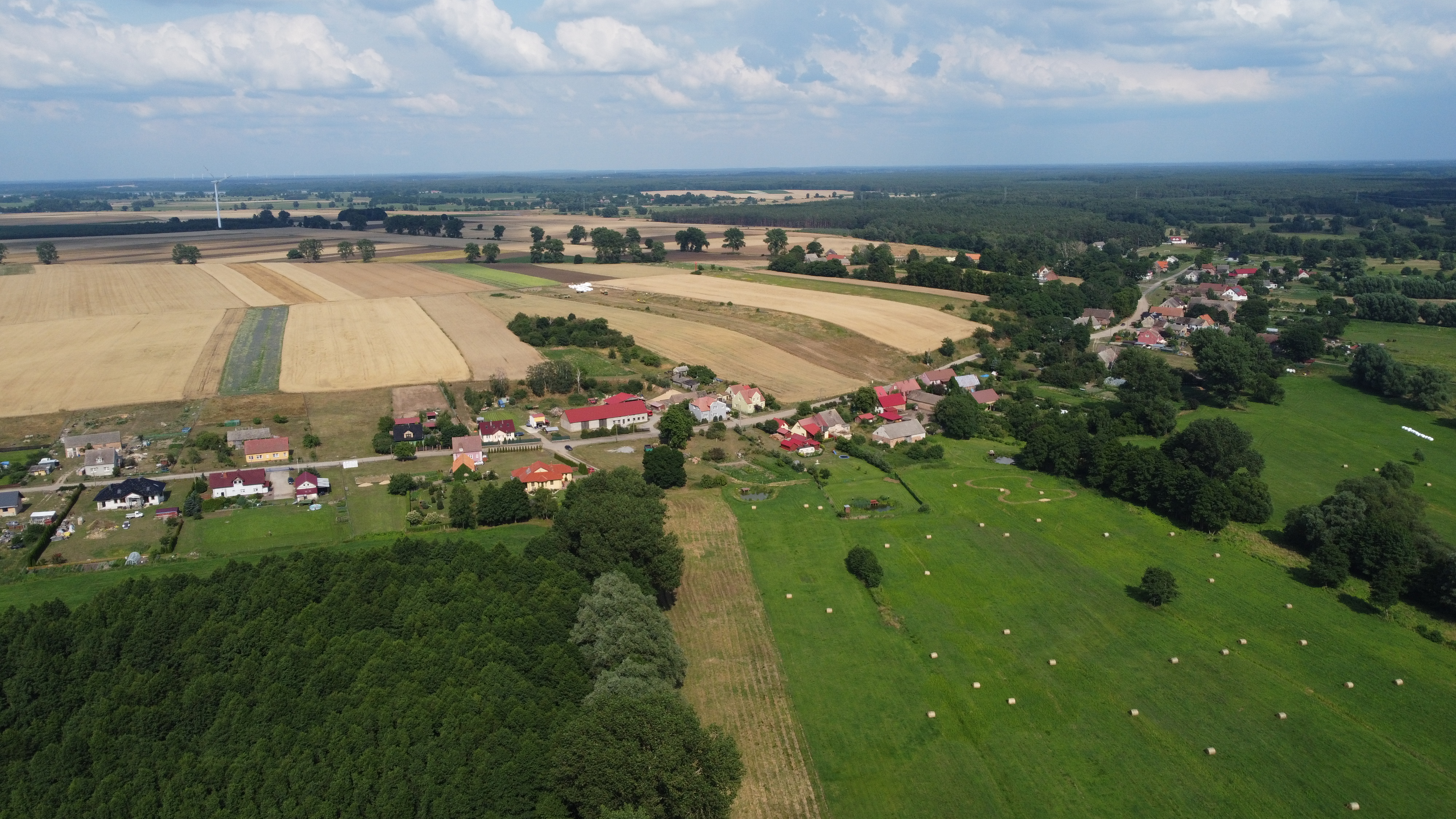

- Location within Poland
- Coordinates: 53°46′N 14°37′E
- Country: Poland
- Voivodeship: West Pomeranian
- County: Kamień
- Gmina: Wolin

Population
  - Total: 170
- Time zone: UTC+1 (CET)
  - Summer (DST): UTC+2 (CEST)
- Vehicle registration: ZKA

Skoszewo [skɔˈʂɛvɔ] is a village in the administrative district of Gmina Wolin, within Kamień County, West Pomeranian Voivodeship, in north-western Poland. It is approximately 9 km (6 mi) south of Wolin, 26 km (16 mi) south-west of Kamień Pomorski, and 39 km (24 mi) north of the regional capital Szczecin.

The village has a population of 170.
