= Laska, West Pomeranian Voivodeship =

Village in Poland

Laska
- Village
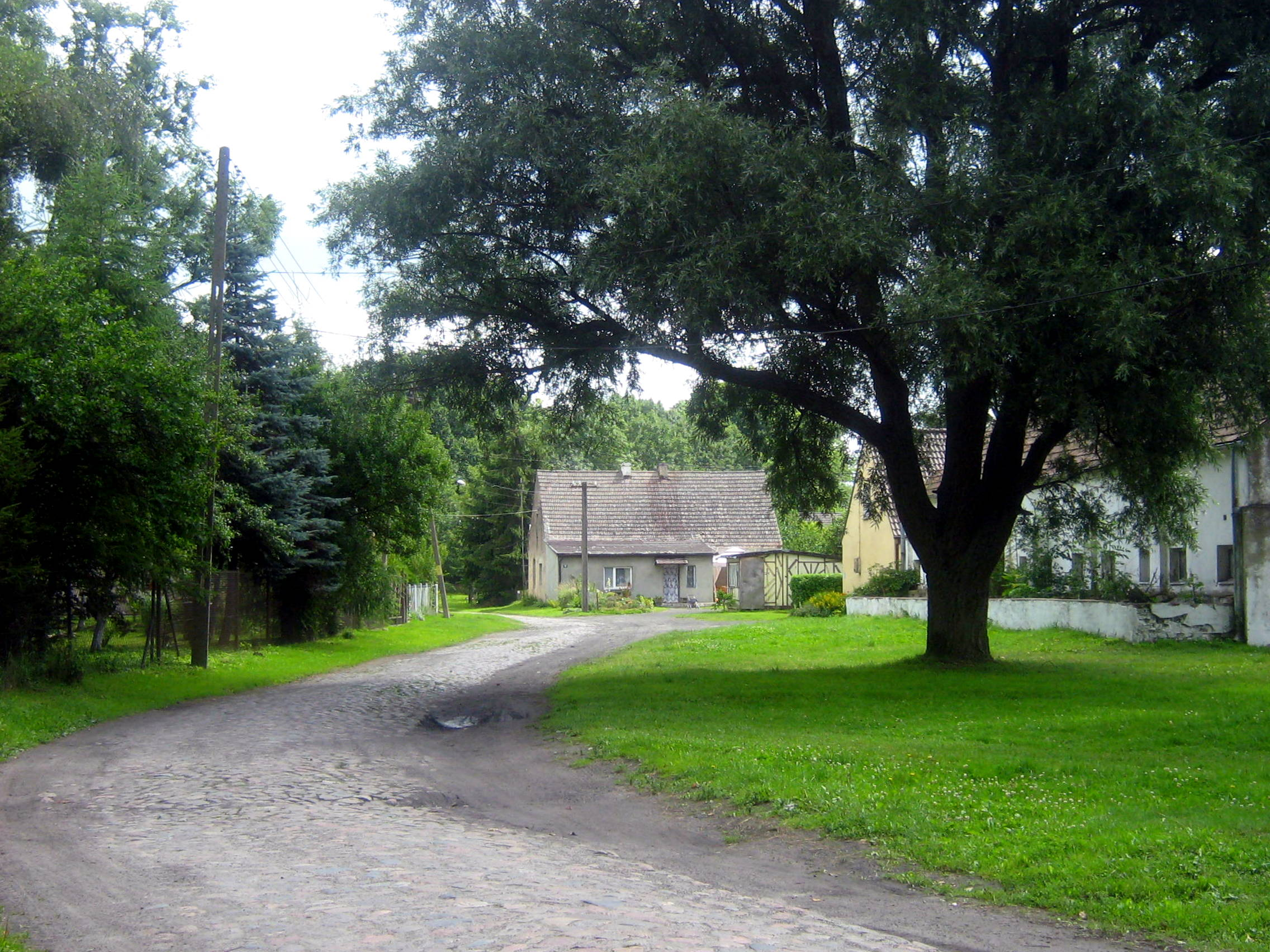

- Location within Poland
- Coordinates: 53°52′N 14°39′E
- Country: Poland
- Voivodeship: West Pomeranian
- County: Kamień
- Gmina: Wolin
- Population: 180

Laska [ˈlaska] (German Laatzig) is a village in the administrative district of Gmina Wolin, within Kamień County, West Pomeranian Voivodeship, in north-western Poland. It lies approximately 4 km (2 mi) north-east of Wolin, 15 km (9 mi) south-west of Kamień Pomorski, and 51 km (32 mi) north of the regional capital Szczecin.

The village has a population of 180.
