= Gogolice, Kamień County =

Gogolice
- Village
- Location within Poland
- Coordinates: 53°49′N 14°37′E
- Country: Poland
- Voivodeship: West Pomeranian
- County: Kamień
- Gmina: Wolin
- Population: 60

Gogolice [ɡɔɡɔˈlit͡sɛ] (German Gaulitz) is a village in the administrative district of Gmina Wolin, within Kamień County, West Pomeranian Voivodeship, in north-western Poland. It lies approximately 3 km (2 mi) south of Wolin, 21 km (13 mi) south-west of Kamień Pomorski, and 45 km (28 mi) north of the regional capital Szczecin.

For the history of the region, see History of Pomerania.

The village has a population of 60.
