= Koniewo, West Pomeranian Voivodeship =

Koniewo
- Village
- Location within Poland
- Coordinates: 53°48′N 14°39′E
- Country: Poland
- Voivodeship: West Pomeranian
- County: Kamień
- Gmina: Wolin
- Population: 380

Koniewo [kɔˈɲɛvɔ] (German Kunow) is a village in the administrative district of Gmina Wolin, within Kamień County, West Pomeranian Voivodeship, in north-western Poland. It lies approximately 6 km (4 mi) south-east of Wolin, 21 km (13 mi) south-west of Kamień Pomorski, and 43 km (27 mi) north of the regional capital Szczecin.

The village has a population of 380.
