= Mokrzyca Mała =

- Village
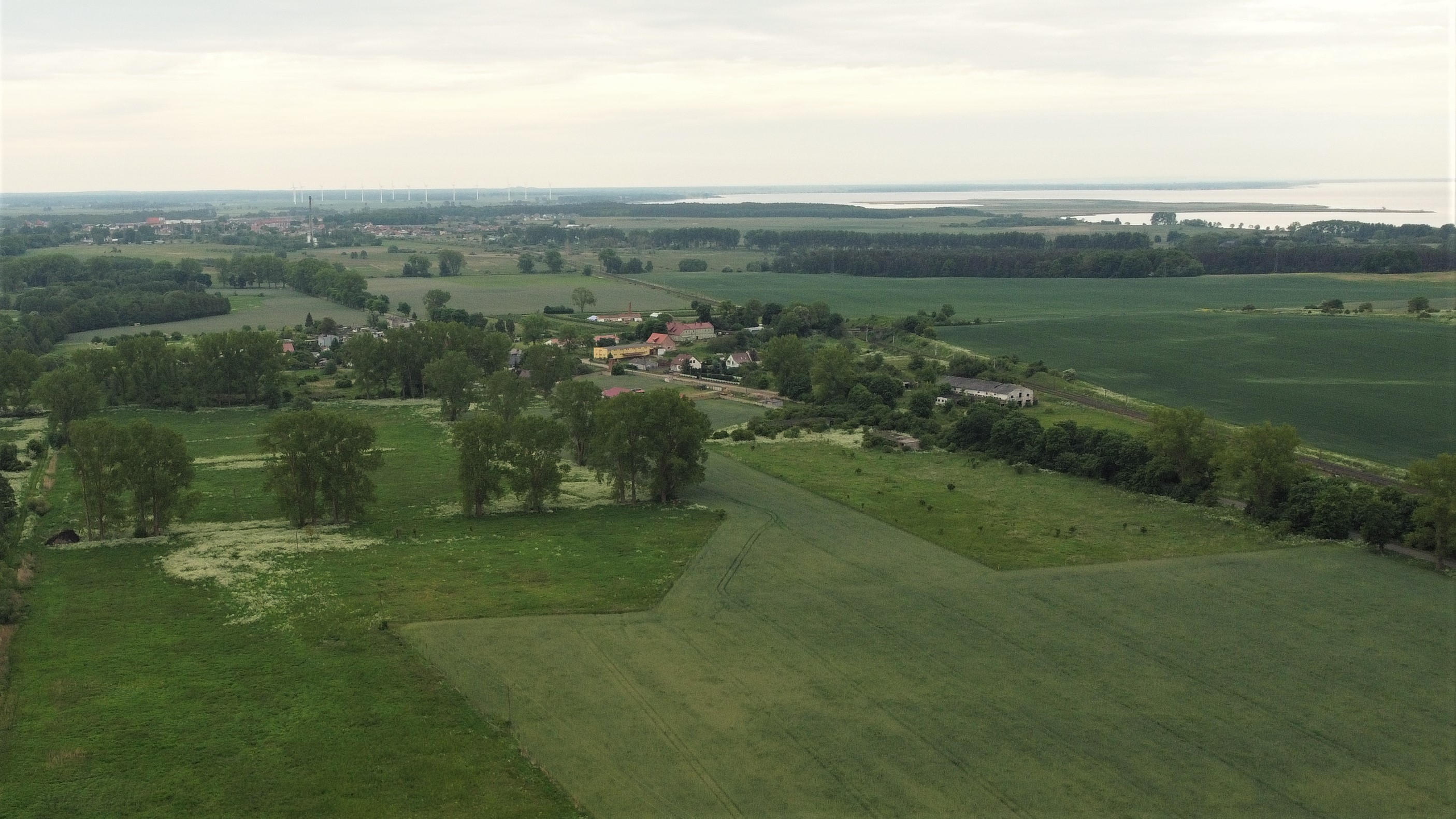

- Location within Poland
- Coordinates: 53°51′N 14°35′E
- Country: Poland
- Voivodeship: West Pomeranian
- County: Kamień
- Gmina: Wolin

Population
  - Total: 200
- Time zone: UTC+1 (CET)
  - Summer (DST): UTC+2 (CEST)
- Vehicle registration: ZKA

Mokrzyca Mała [mɔˈkʂɨt͡sa ˈmawa] is a village in the administrative district of Gmina Wolin, within Kamień County, West Pomeranian Voivodeship, in north-western Poland. It lies approximately 3 km (2 mi) north-west of Wolin, 19 km (12 mi) south-west of Kamień Pomorski, and 49 km (30 mi) north of the regional capital Szczecin.

The village has a population of 200.
