= Mierzęcin, West Pomeranian Voivodeship =

Mierzęcin
- Village
- Location within Poland
- Coordinates: 53°49′28″N 14°42′37″E
- Country: Poland
- Voivodeship: West Pomeranian
- County: Kamień
- Gmina: Wolin

Mierzęcin [mjɛˈʐɛnt͡ɕin] (German: Martenthin) is a village in the administrative district of Gmina Wolin, within Kamień County, West Pomeranian Voivodeship, in north-western Poland. It lies approximately 7 km (4 mi) east of Wolin, 17 km (11 mi) south of Kamień Pomorski, and 47 km (29 mi) north of the regional capital Szczecin.

== Notable residents ==
- Heino Heinrich Graf von Flemming (1632–1706), Field Marshal
