= Piaski Wielkie, West Pomeranian Voivodeship =

Piaski Wielkie
- Village
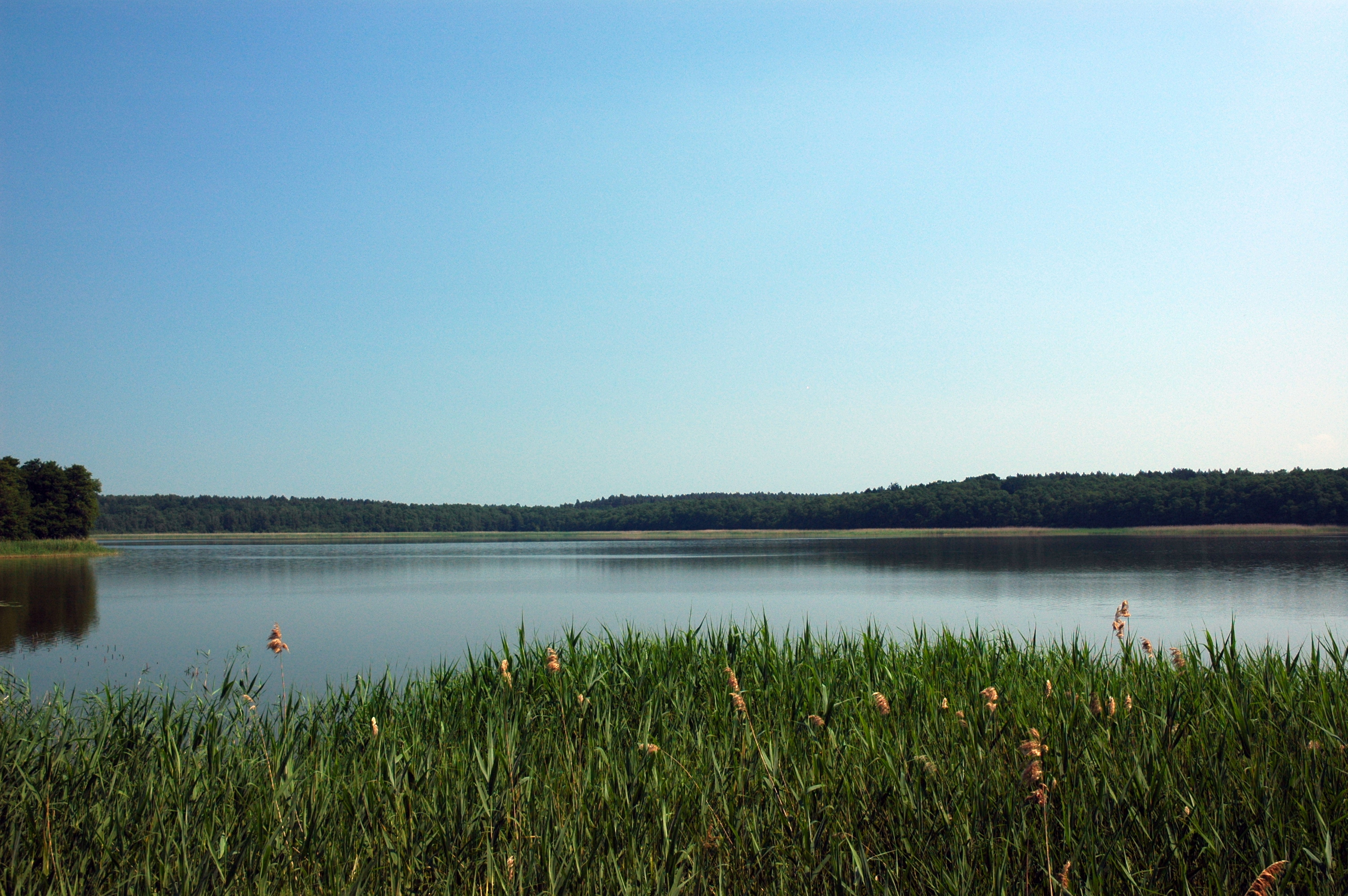
- Piaski Lake in Piaski Wielkie

- Location within Poland
- Coordinates: 53°51′N 14°42′E
- Country: Poland
- Voivodeship: West Pomeranian
- County: Kamień
- Gmina: Wolin

Population
  - Total: 290
- Time zone: UTC+1 (CET)
  - Summer (DST): UTC+2 (CEST)
- Vehicle registration: ZKA

Piaski Wielkie (Polish pronunciation: [ˈpjaskʲi ˈvjɛlkʲɛ]) is a village in the administrative district of Gmina Wolin, within Kamień County, West Pomeranian Voivodeship, in north-western Poland. It lies approximately 6 km (4 mi) east of Wolin, 15 km (9 mi) south-west of Kamień Pomorski, and 49 km (30 mi) north of the regional capital Szczecin.

It is situated on the western shore of Piaski Lake.

The village has a population of 290.
