= Warnow (disambiguation) =

Warnow may refer to:

- Warnow, a river in Mecklenburg-Vorpommern, Germany
- Warnow (Güstrow), a municipality in the district of Güstrow, Mecklenburg-Vorpommern, Germany
- Warnow, Pommern, German name of Warnowo, West Pomeranian Voivodeship, modern Poland
- Warnow, Nordwestmecklenburg, a municipality in the district Nordwestmecklenburg, Mecklenburg-Vorpommern, Germany
- SS Warnow, a German merchant ship requisitioned by the Kriegsmarine during the Second World War
- Harry Warnow (1908–1994), birth name of Raymond Scott, American composer, band leader, pianist, record producer, and inventor of electronic instruments
- Mark Warnow (1900–1949), American big band leader and violinist
- Tandy Warnow, American computer scientist
