= Warnowo, West Pomeranian Voivodeship =

Warnowo
- Village
- Location within Poland
- Coordinates: 53°55′54″N 14°32′47″E
- Country: Poland
- Voivodeship: West Pomeranian
- County: Kamień
- Gmina: Wolin
- Population: 340
- Website: http://warnowo.tnb.pl/

Warnowo [varˈnɔvɔ] (German: Warnow) is a village in the administrative district of Gmina Wolin, within Kamień County, West Pomeranian Voivodeship, in north-western Poland. It lies approximately 11 km (7 mi) north-west of Wolin, 17 km (11 mi) west of Kamień Pomorski, and 58 km (36 mi) north of the regional capital Szczecin.

The village has a population of 340.
