= Coat of arms of Wolin =

- Adopted: 29 April 1996 (current version)
- Shield: French-style escutcheon
- Compartment: Red griffin holding golden (yellow) flower of the plumeless thistle in his left arm, and the golden (yellow) hexagram
- Use: Wolin, Gmina Wolin

The coat of arms of Wolin serves as a symbol of the town of Wolin, and the municipality of Wolin in West Pomeranian Voivodeship, Poland.

== Design ==
The coat of arms has a silver (white) French-style escutcheon, with the red griffin faced to the right, that holds the golden (yellow) flower of the plumeless thistle in his left arm. On the right, under his arm is located the golden (yellow) hexagram (six-pointed star).

== History ==
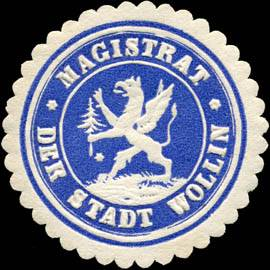
The seal of the town council of Wolin, used between 1850 and 1945.

The first known appearance of the coat of arms of Wolin comes from 1301 seal, which depicted a griffin standing below an arch of the city gate, with the gata doors located on its left and right. The seals from 15th century depicted the coat of arms, as a griffin holding a plumeless thistles, with a star below it.

The current coat of arms has been established by the Town Council of Wolin on 29 April 1996.

== Flag of Wolin ==
The flag of Wolin.

The flag of the town of Wolin, and the municipality of Wolin, is a rectangle and consist of the coat of arms on the white background. The flag proportions are not specified, though in the establishing resolution, it was depicted with the proportions of 1:2. It was established together with the town coat of arms on 29 April 1996.

== Gallery ==
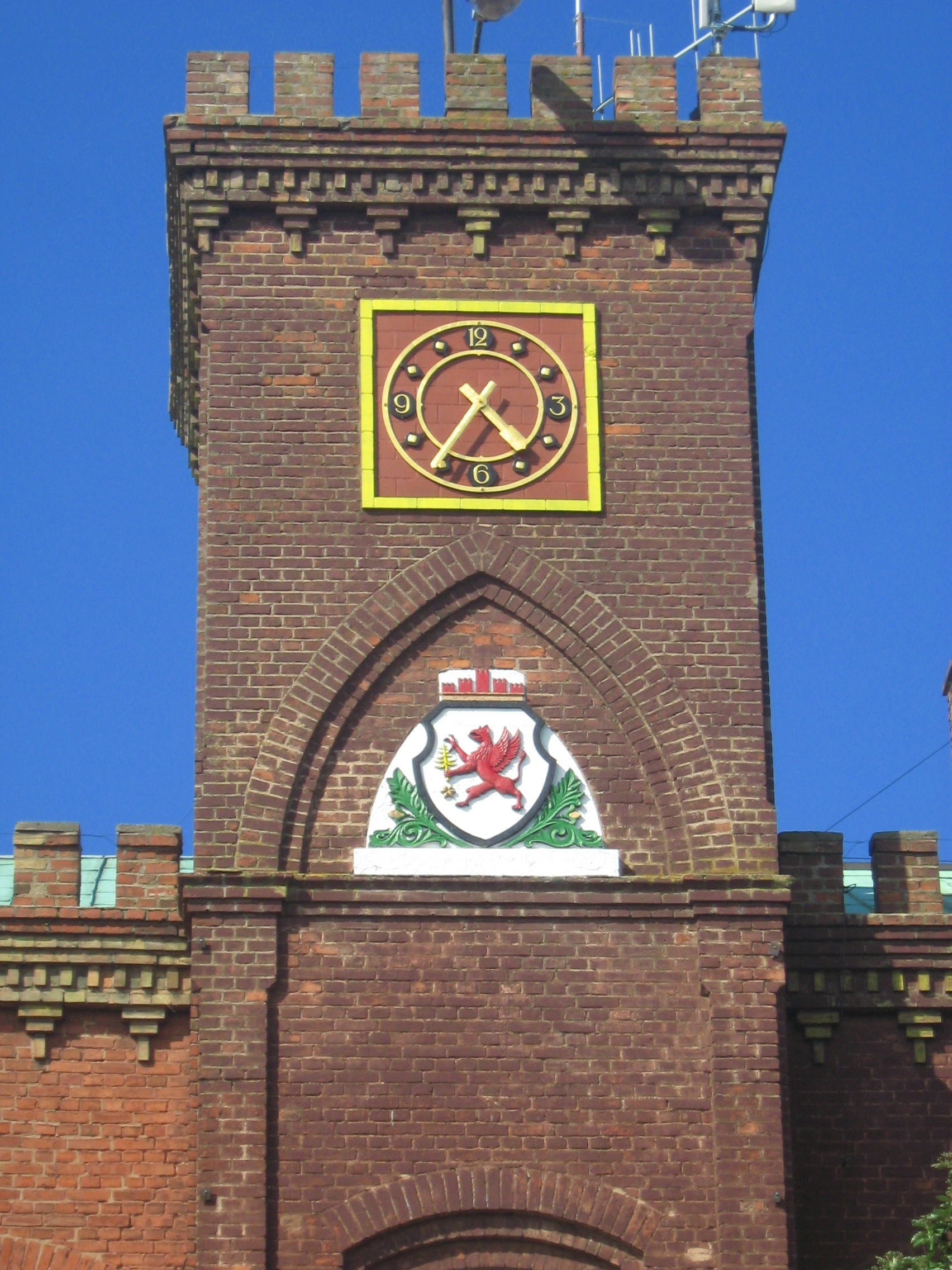
The coat of arms on the Wolin Town Hall.

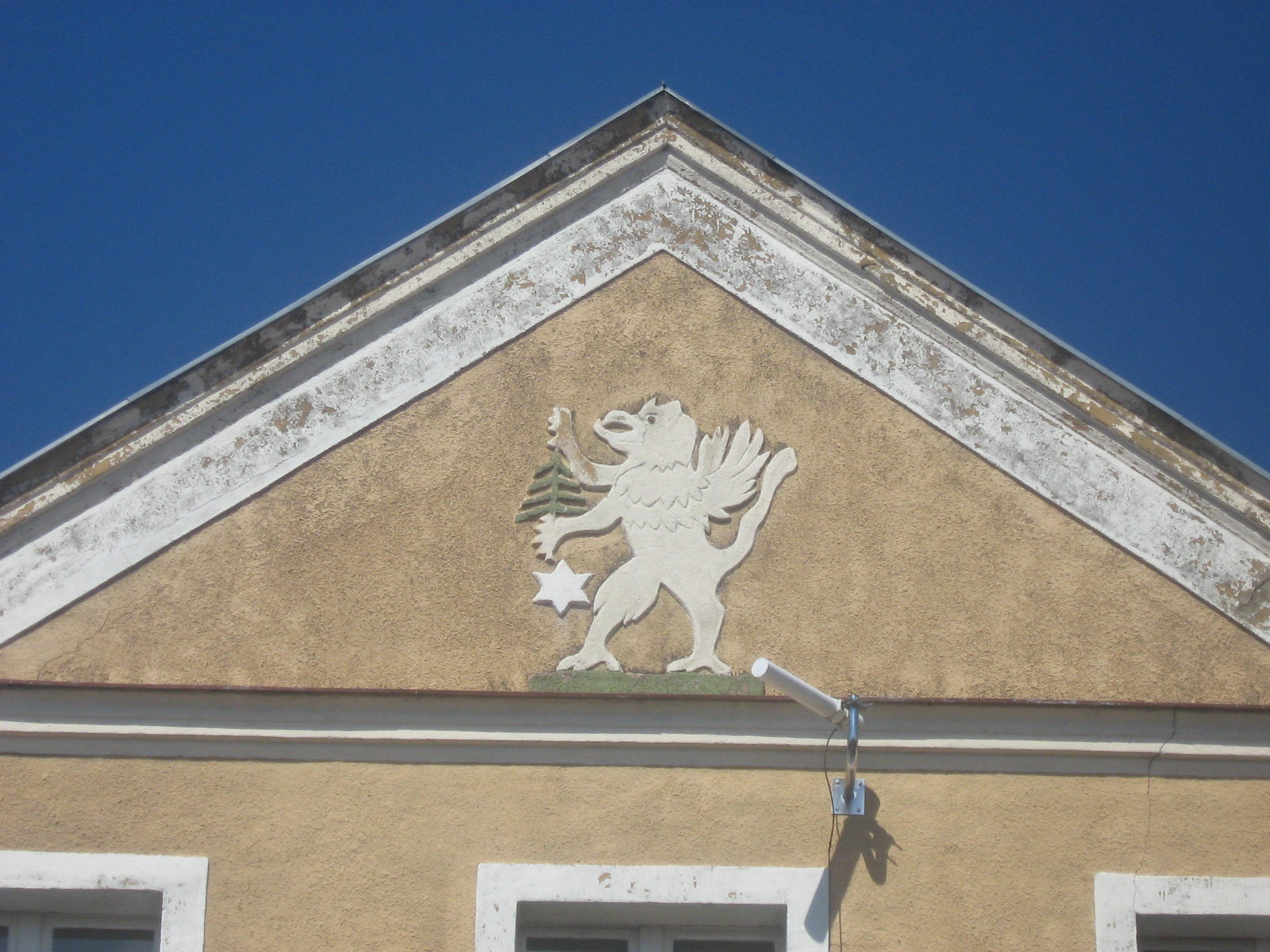
The coat of arms on the Wolin Post Office.
