= Gmina Wolin =

Gmina Wolin Wolin Commune
- Gmina
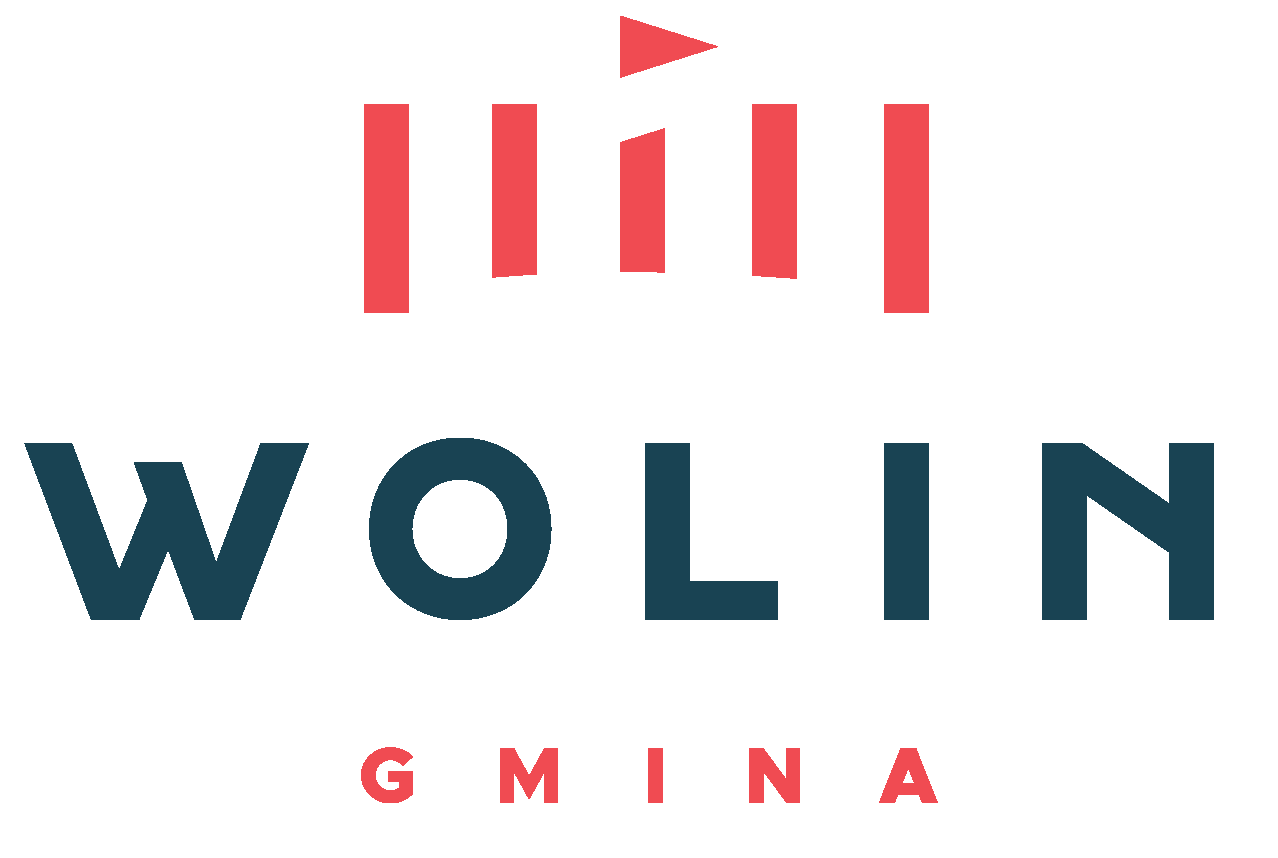
- Flag Coat of arms Brandmark
- Interactive map of Gmina Wolin
- Coordinates (Wolin): 53°50′29″N 14°36′41″E
- Country: Poland
- Voivodeship: West Pomeranian
- County: Kamień
- Seat: Wolin

Area
  - Total: 327.41 km^{2} (126.41 sq mi)

Population (2006)
  - Total: 12,351
  - Density: 37.723/km^{2} (97.703/sq mi)
  - Urban: 4,878
  - Rural: 7,473
- Website: http://www.wolin.pl/

Gmina Wolin is an urban-rural gmina (administrative district) in Kamień County, West Pomeranian Voivodeship, in north-western Poland. Its seat is the town of Wolin, which lies approximately 19 kilometres (12 mi) south-west of Kamień Pomorski and 48 km (30 mi) north of the regional capital Szczecin.

The gmina covers an area of 327.41 square kilometres (126.4 sq mi), and as of 2006 its total population is 12,351 (out of which the population of Wolin amounts to 4,878, and the population of the rural part of the gmina is 7,473).

== Villages ==
Apart from the town of Wolin, Gmina Wolin contains the villages and settlements of Chynowo, Dargobądz, Darzowice, Dobropole, Domysłów, Dramino, Gogolice, Jagienki, Jagniątkowo, Jarzębowo, Karnocice, Kodrąb, Kodrąbek, Kołczewo, Koniewo, Korzęcin, Ładzin, Laska, Łojszyno, Łuskowo, Mierzęcin, Mokrzyca Mała, Mokrzyca Wielka, Ostromice, Parłowo, Piaski Wielkie, Płocin, Rabiąż, Recław, Rekowo, Rzeczyn, Sierosław, Siniechowo, Skoszewo, Strzegowo, Sułomino, Świętouść, Troszyn, Troszynek, Unin, Warnowo, Wartowo, Wiejkówko, Wiejkowo, Wisełka, Zagórze, Zastań and Żółwino.

== Neighbouring gminas ==
Gmina Wolin is bordered by the gminas of Dziwnów, Golczewo, Kamień Pomorski, Międzyzdroje, Przybiernów and Stepnica.
