= Symbols of Kamień County =

Coat of arms and flag of Kamień County, West Pomeranian Voivodeship, Poland

The coat of arms of Kamień County.

The flag of the Kamień County.

The coat of arms of Kamień County, West Pomeranian Voivodeship located in Poland, is divided horizontally into blue and white stripes, with 2 golden (yellow) crosiers and 2 red roses within blue stripe, and red Griffin with yellow claws and beak, within the white stripe. The flag of the county is a rectangle divided horizontally into white and blue stripes, with the coat of arms in the middle.

== Design ==
The coat of arms is an Iberian style escutcheon, that is divided horizontally onto two stripes: blue on the left, and silver (white) on the right. Within the blue stripe, are located two golden (yellow) crosiers, and two roses with red petals and golden (yellow) inside. Within the white stripe, is located a left-facing red Griffin with yellow claws and beak, with red tongue.

The elements within the blue stripe are a reference to the coat of arms of Kamień Pomorski, which is the seat of the county. Its coat of arms include John the Baptist with two golden (yellow) crosiers with roses. The red griffin on the white background, is a design that had been used by the House of Griffin, that ruled over Pomeralia in the Middle Ages.

The flag is a rectangle, that is divided horizontally into two stripes, white on the left, and blue, on the right, with the coat of arms placed in the middle. Its aspect ratio of height to width is 5:8.

== History ==
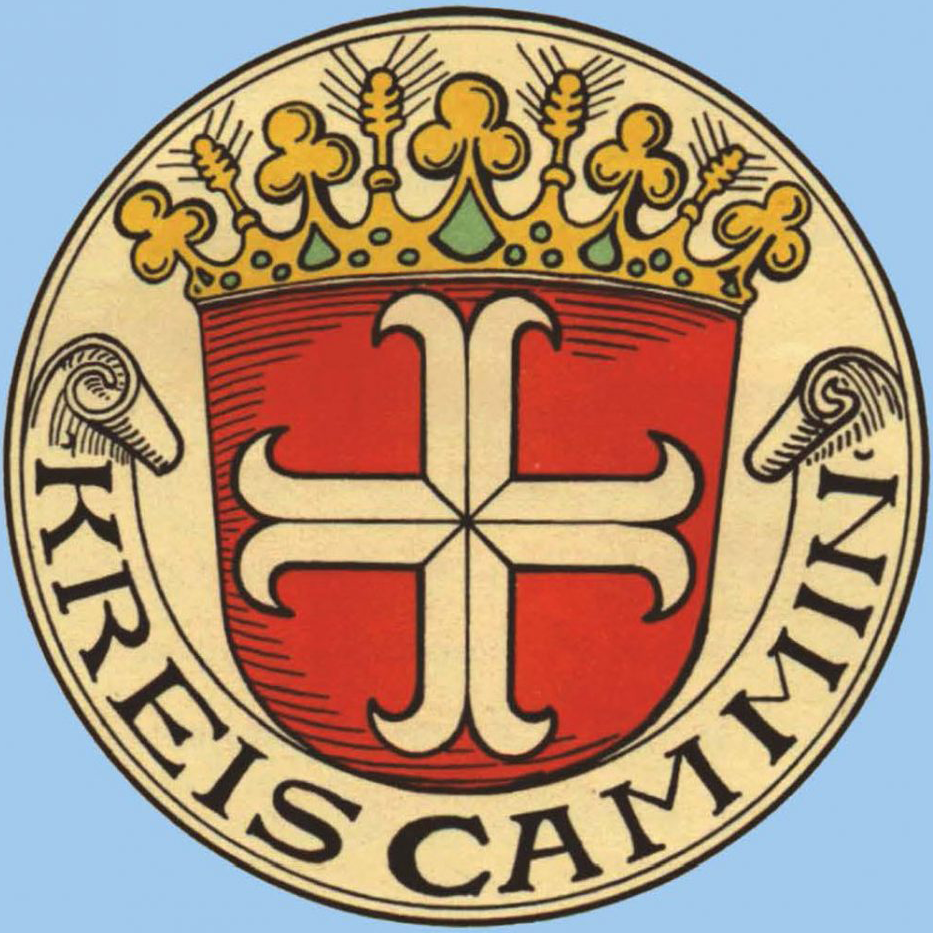
The seal of the Cammin in Pommmern District, which functioned from 1818 to 1945.

Historically, within the current boundaries of Kamień County was located the Cammin in Pommmern District, which functioned from 1818 to 1945. Its seal depicted a white (silver) cross cercelée, formed of four arms of identical length, each divided into two symmetrical elements, with forked tips curving around both ways. It was placed within a red Iberian-style escutcheon (shield) with square top and rounded base, with a yellow (golden) open crown on the top. Below the shield was a riband curved around it, with words Kreis Cammin written in capitalized black letters. It translates from German to Cammin District or Kamień District. The entire design was placed within a white circle.

Kamień County was established on 1 January 1999. Its coat of arms and flag were adopted by the Kamień County Council on 3 February 2006.
