= Rachel Zuntz =

German businesswoman

Rachel Zuntz (1787–1874), was a German businessperson. She founded the famous coffee company A. Zuntz sel. Wwe. in Bonn in 1837, which expanded all over Germany and Belgium and provided coffee for the Imperial German court.
