= Alexander Zuntz =

Alexander Zuntz (May 15, 1742 – October 15, 1819) was a Hessian Jew who was a noted figure in the early American Jewish community and was one of the founders of the Bank of New York in 1784 and the New York Stock Exchange.

== Early life ==
He was born May 15, 1742, in Westphalia, Germany.

Zuntz came to America in 1779 during the Revolutionary War with the British army. He was a civilian commissary, army supplier, and adjutant of the Hessian mercenary forces, that were employed by England's King George III to fight the revolutionaries.

== Jewish community ==
Zuntz played an important role in saving the Congregation Shearith Israel, founded in 1654 as the first Jewish congregation in America, by persuading the military leaders to not use the sanctuary as a hospital. During the time the British controlled New York, Zuntz replaced Gershon Mendes Seixas as hazzan in the Shearith Israel Congregation, because like many Hessian and British Jews, Zuntz, in contrast to Seixas, preferred to stay in America and not go back to Europe.

Zuntz remained involved in the Jewish community and after he became treasurer, he took over the presidency of the Shearith Israel Congregation from Lyon Jonas.

== Career ==
Zuntz worked as a merchant and was one of the founders of the Bank of New York in 1784 and the New York Stock Exchange. In 1785, he had to post his insolvency because of the economic crisis in the United States, caused by the British by flooding New York with manufacturers. However, in 1797, he finally became successful as a broker and money lender.

== Death ==
He died October 15, 1819, in New York.
