= Wolin (town) =

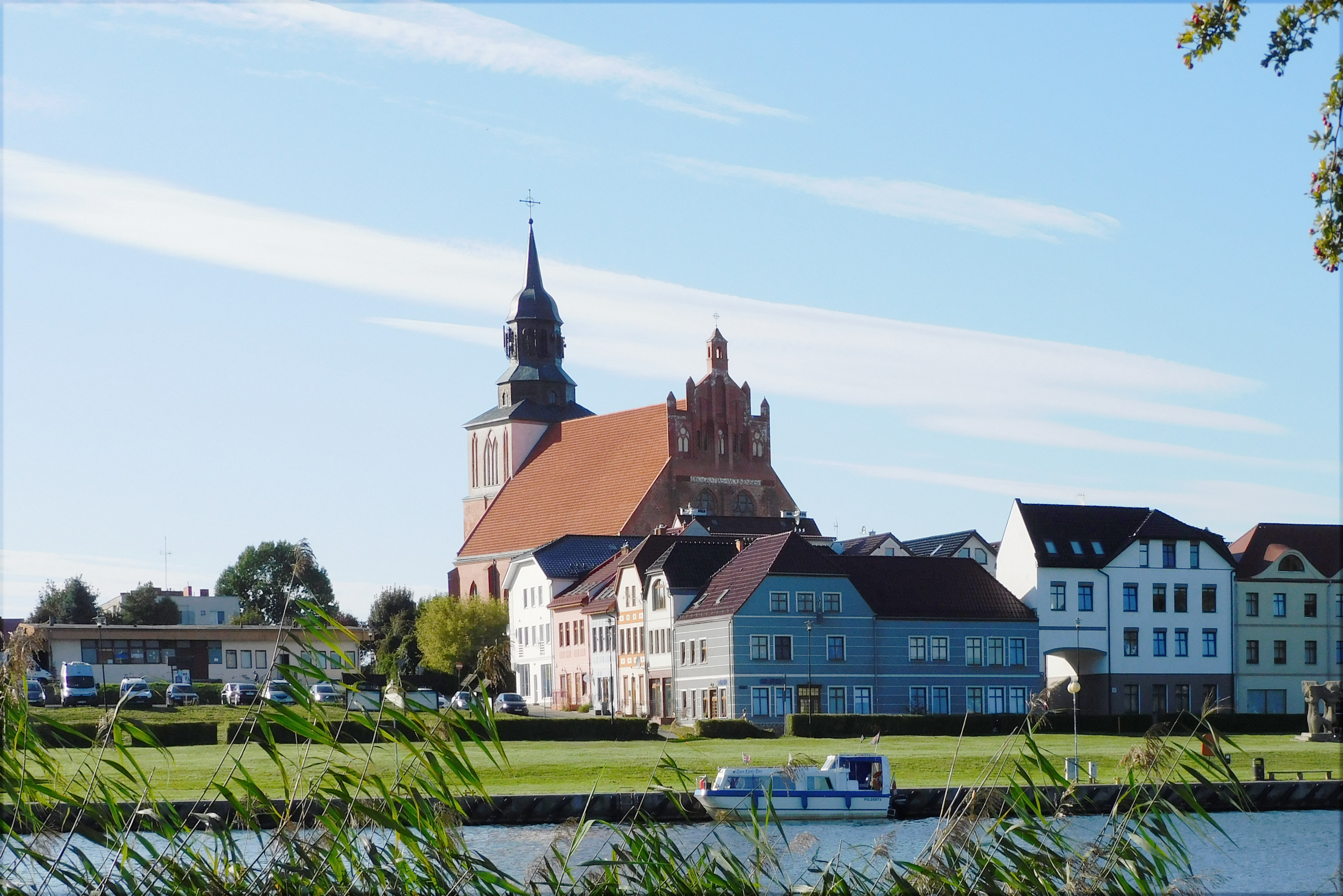

- Flag Coat of arms

- Location within Poland
- Coordinates: 53°50′35″N 14°36′45″E
- Country: Poland
- Voivodeship: West Pomeranian
- County: Kamień
- Gmina: Wolin

Area
  - Total: 14.41 km^{2} (5.56 sq mi)

Population (2006)
  - Total: 4,878
  - Density: 338.5/km^{2} (876.7/sq mi)
- Time zone: UTC+1 (CET)
  - Summer (DST): UTC+2 (CEST)
- Postal code: 72-510
- Vehicle registration: ZKA
- Climate: Cfb

Wolin ([ˈvɔlin]; German: Wollin) is a town in Kamień County, West Pomeranian Voivodeship in northwestern Poland. It is the seat of Gmina Wolin. It is situated on the southern tip of Wolin island off the Baltic coast of the historic region of Western Pomerania. The island lies at the edge of the strait of Dziwna.

The town, now a fishing port and gateway to the island's bathing resorts, has a population of approximately 4,900. Dating from the 9th century, it has been associated with the semi-legendary settlements of Jomsburg, Jumne, Julin and Vineta. It played an important role in the conversion of Pomerania and in 1140 became the first see of the Pomeranian diocese. Several ruins from the Slavic period occupy the area. The early medieval town fell victim to the late 12th century Danish raids, and was refounded in 1260.

== Transport ==
The town of Wolin is located beside the S3 expressway, which is, in turn, part of the European route E65 running across Europe from Sweden to Greece.

There is also a railway station.

== History ==
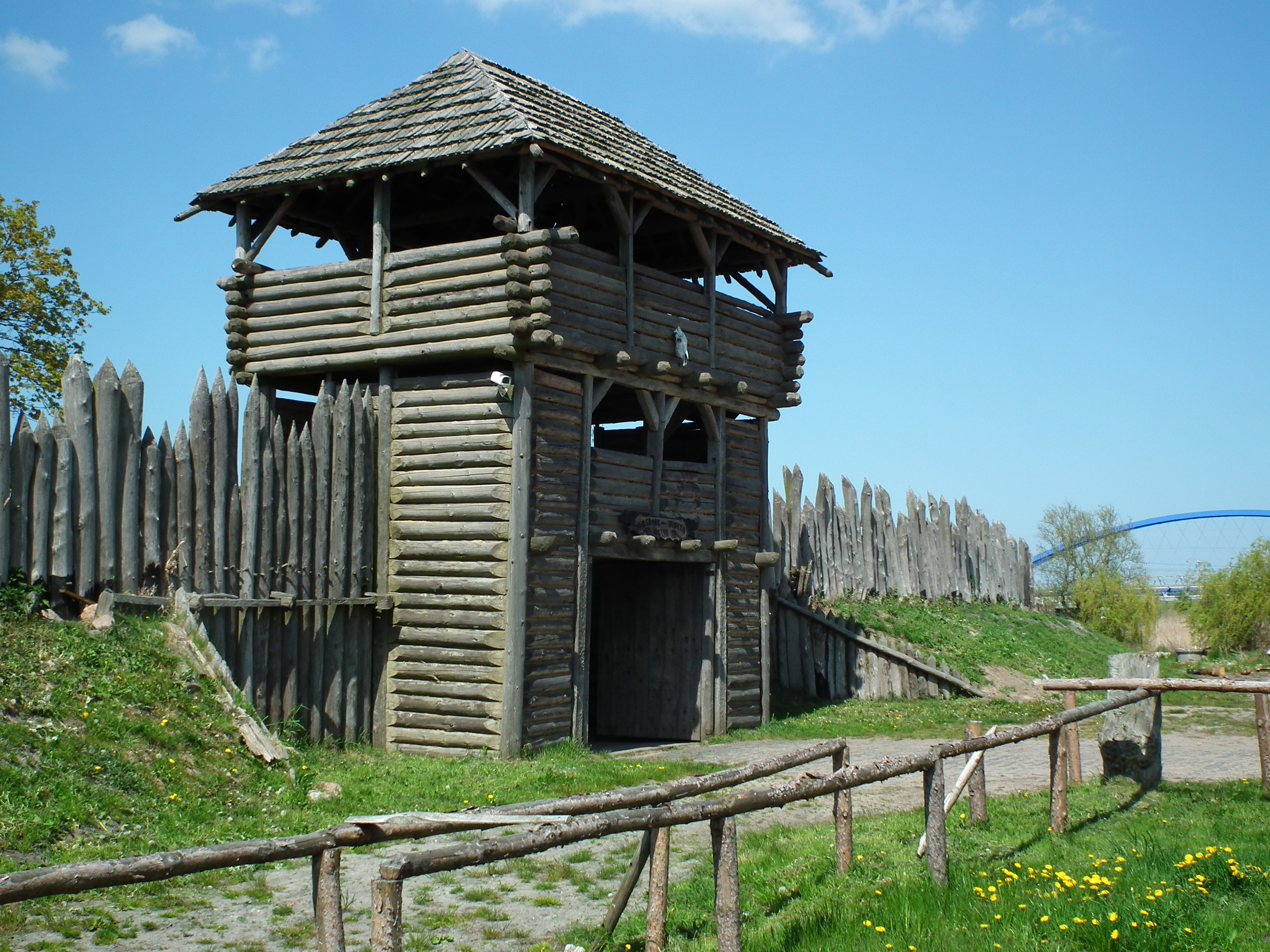
Medieval open-air museum in Wolin

The ford across the river Dziwna on which Wolin is located has been used as far back as the Stone Age. Archaeological excavations of soil layers indicate that there was a settlement in the area during the Migration period, at the turn of the 5th and 6th centuries. The place was then abandoned for approximately hundred years. At the end of the 8th or the beginning of the 9th century the area was leveled and a new settlement constructed. The earliest evidence of fortifications dates to the first half of the 9th century. In the second half of the 9th century there was a central fortified area and two suburbs, to the north and south of the center. These became enclosed and fortified between the end of the 9th and the 10th centuries.

In the 8th century there was a West Slavic settlement on the island. The name of the local tribe was recorded as "Velunzani" (Wolinians) in the 9th century by the Bavarian Geographer, and is considered a sub-tribe of both the Slavic Pomeranians and the Veleti (later Lutizians). The Wolinians are described by Jan Maria Piskorski as the most powerful Pomeranian tribe, due to their control of a multi-ethnic emporium at the site of the present-day town. Similar emporia were also set up elsewhere along the southern coastline of the Baltic Sea since the 8th century.

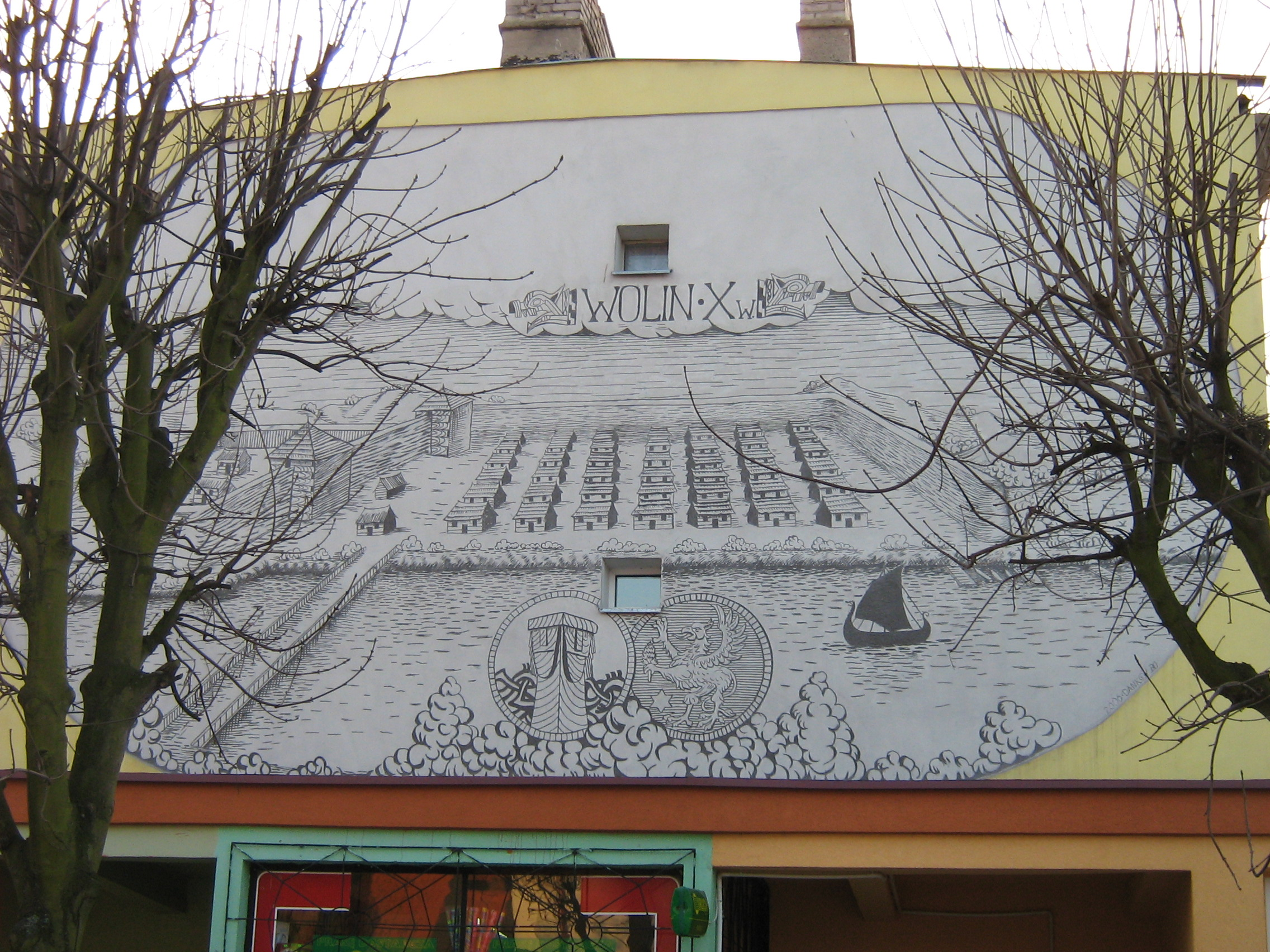
10th-century view of Wolin on a mural in the town center

This emporium, by contemporary chronicles referred to as Jumne or Julin, began to prosper in the 9th century. Archaeological research has revealed seaside fortifications that have been dated back to the beginning 10th century, and also remnants of older fortifications, probably pointing to an earlier burgh with an adjacent open settlement. In the 960s, the Jewish merchant Ibrahim ibn Jakub described the settlement as a town with several thousand inhabitants and twelve gates. Besides the Wolinians, there were Scandinavian, Saxons and Rus' (people). Later, the town was mentioned in the chronicles of Adam of Bremen. Adam mentioned a lighthouse, which he described as "the lamp of Vulcan". All these descriptions contributed to the Vineta legend. Though other towns are also considered possible locations of Vineta, it is believed today to be identical with Wolin. The same is true for Jomsborg, a stronghold set up by Danish king Harald Bluetooth and Swedish prince Styrbjörn in the course of Harald's internal struggles with his son, Sweyn Forkbeard, in the 970s or 980s, which housed a garrison of soldiers known as Jomsvikings.

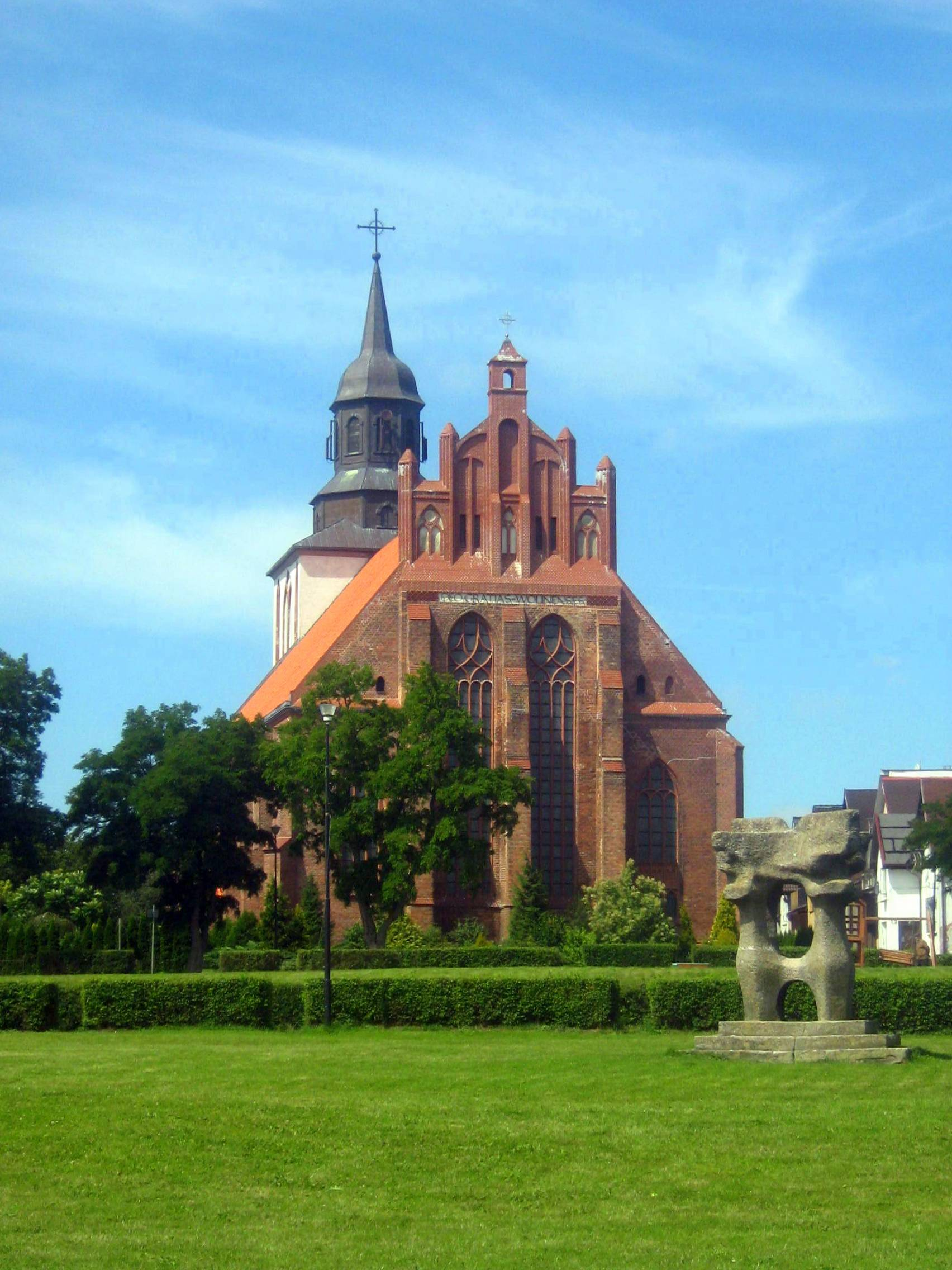
St. Nicholas church

In the late 10th century, the Polish dukes Mieszko I and Bolesław I Chrobry subdued most of Pomerania and also fought the Wolinians. Despite a victory of Mieszko in a 967 battle, the Polish dukes, according to Jan Maria Piskorski, did not succeed to subdue the area. Władysław Filipowiak however says that the battle "probably led to the establishment of the rule of the winner over the town." In 1982, Joachim Herrmann suggested that Bolesław had established a Viking colony under Palnatoki there to defend his realm, a thesis that in 2000 had been revisited by Leszek Słupecki who like Władysław Duczko (2000) called for further research on resident Vikings in Jomsborg/Wolin. Wolin was one of five largest cities of Poland, and the largest port city on the Baltic Sea. Filipowiak says that, based on the archaeological evidence, "there might actually have existed in Wolin a mercenary company placed by the Piast rulers in the unruly town, which in 1007 informed the German Emperor that Bolesław the Brave had been weaving a dangerous plot," but also points out the need for further research on this subject. The meeting with Henry II, Holy Roman Emperor in Regensburg on 6 April 1007 resulted in the latter declaring war on Bolesław, after Wolinian and other delegates had reported that Bolesław was preparing for war and had sought their support by offering money and making promises. Oskar Eggert and Filipowiak say that suggests that the town was independent in its policies by that time. Filipowiak further says that in the 11th century, Wolin became a "save haven for Danish refugees, which in that period led to inner unrest and conflicts as well as pirate activities." Much of Wolin was destroyed in 1043 by Dano-Norwegian King Magnus the Good, who however failed to conquer its center. Also in the mid-11th century, export and wealth were greatly reduced, in part due to the breakdown of the Polish market. Yet the Wolinians retained their independence and continued to house refugees from the Danish opposition, causing Danish king Erik I Evergood to mount another campaign in 1098.

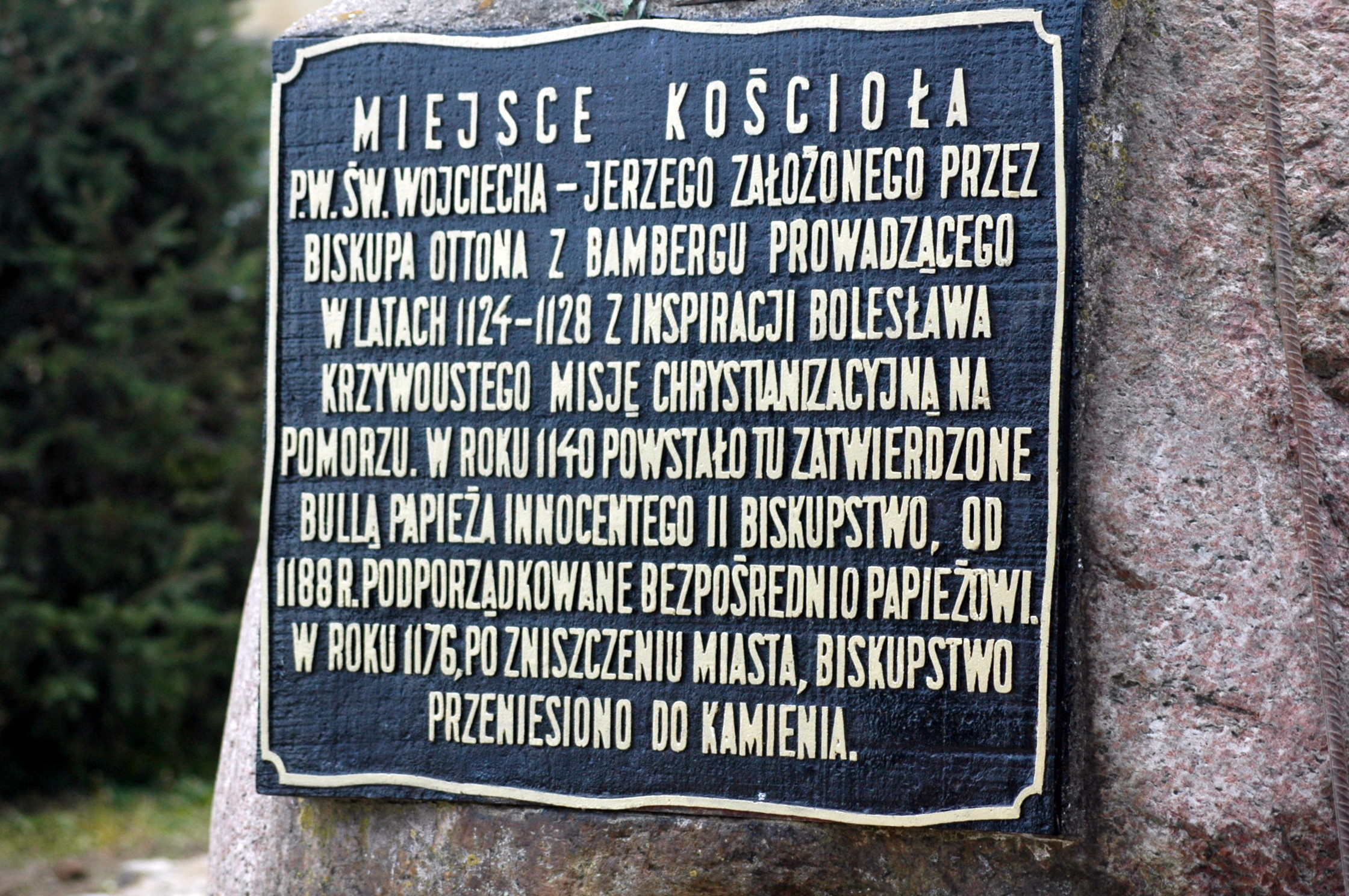
Memorial plaque at the site of the former Saint Adalbert church

In 1121/22, the Polish duke Bolesław III Wrymouth conquered the area along with the Duchy of Pomerania under Wartislaw I. Bolesław aimed at Christianizing the area and in 1122 sent the Spanish eremite Bernard on a mission to Wolin. The inhabitants, reluctant to convert to a religion of a man who did not even wear shoes, beat him up badly and expelled him. With the approval of both Lothair III, Holy Roman Emperor, and Pope Callixtus II, Bolesław initiated another mission of Saint Otto of Bamberg in 1124. When Otto, a respected and wealthy man accompanied by German and Polish clergymen and military units, arrived in Wolin, he had already successfully converted the Pyrzyce and Kamień areas. Yet, he was met with distrust, and the town's inhabitants finally gave in to convert to Christianity only if Otto managed to convert Szczecin, which the Wolinians assumed was unachievable. Yet, when Otto after two months of work and threatening with another military intervention managed to convert Szczecin, he returned to Wolin and the Wolinians accepted conversion.

Otto's second mission in 1128 was initiated by Holy Roman Emperor Lothair in 1128 after a pagan reaction. While this second mission was oriented more towards the more western portion of Pomerania, Otto also visited Wolin again. Wartislaw I, Duke of Pomerania supported and aided both missions. In 1140, Wolin was made the first episcopal see in Pomerania: Pope Innocent II founded the diocese by a papal bull of 14 October, and made Wolin's church of St. Adalbert its see. However, the see was moved to Grobe Abbey on the island of Usedom after 1150.

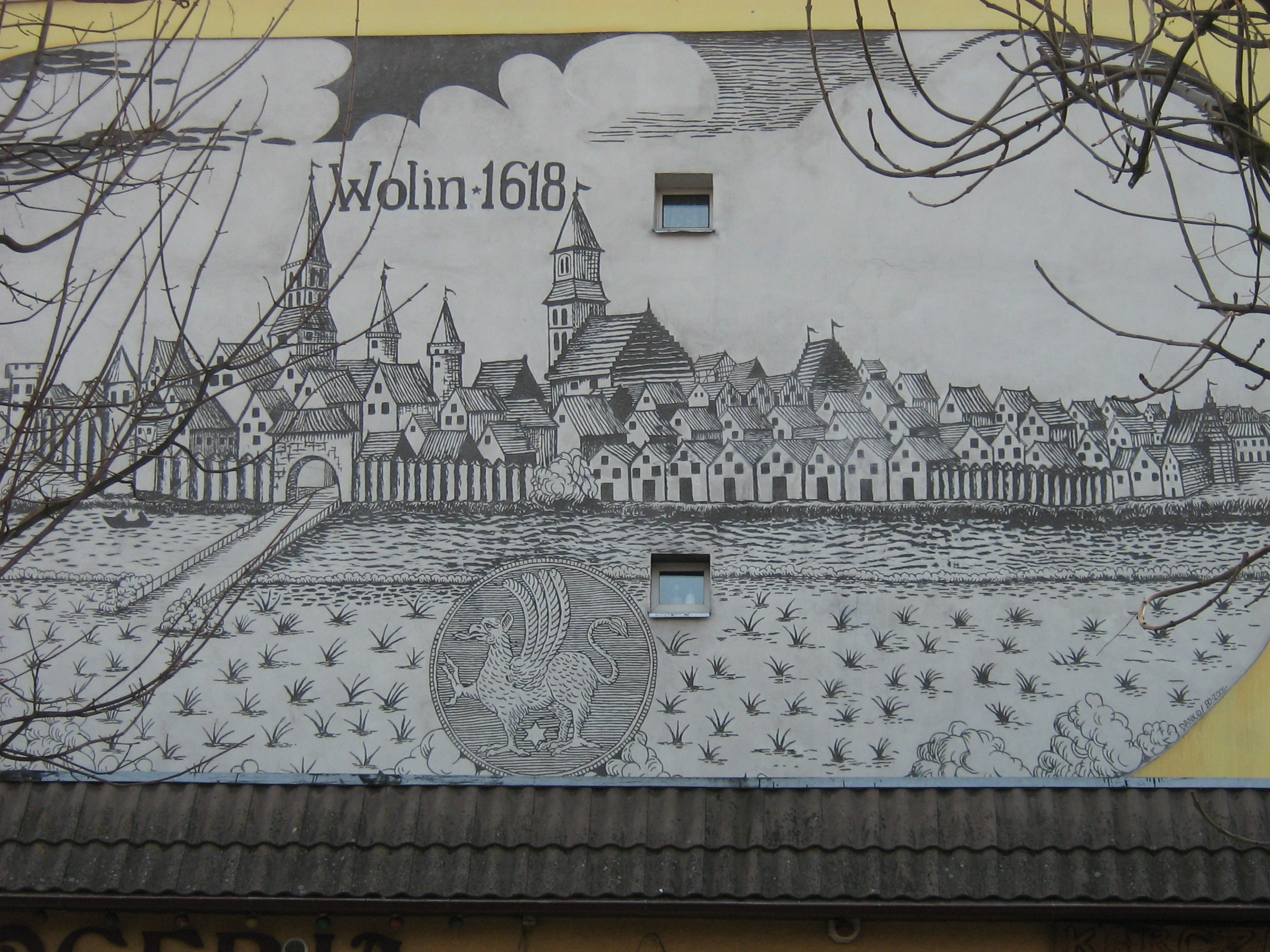
Wolin in 1618

At the same time Wolin economically decayed and was devastated by Danish expeditions, which contributed to the move of the episcopal see to Grobe. The Danish campaigns completely wiped out the town in the late 12th century.

On the ruins of the early medieval town, a new town was founded and granted Lübeck Law. The town remained in the Duchy of Pomerania (which was a vassal of Denmark from 1185, and afterwards was within the Holy Roman Empire since 1227), passing with the duchy to the Swedish Crown following the Treaty of Stettin (1630), the Peace of Westphalia (1648) and the Treaty of Stettin (1653). In August 1659, it was occupied by Austria after the city's siege. Since the Treaty of Stockholm (Great Northern War) of 1720, it was incorporated into the Prussian Province of Pomerania.

The town subsequently became part of the German Empire in 1871, then its successor states the Weimar Republic and the Third Reich. During World War II, the German Nazi government operated a forced labour camp for French and Belgian prisoners of war from the Stalag II-B POW camp. During the final stages of the war, in February 1945, the German-perpetrated death march of Allied prisoners-of-war from the Stalag XX-B POW camp passed through the town. In 1945, with the conclusion of the Second World War, Wollin was conquered by the Red Army and handed over to Poland and the German population was expelled in accordance to the Potsdam Agreement. The town was once again named Wolin and resettled by Poles.

== Gallery ==
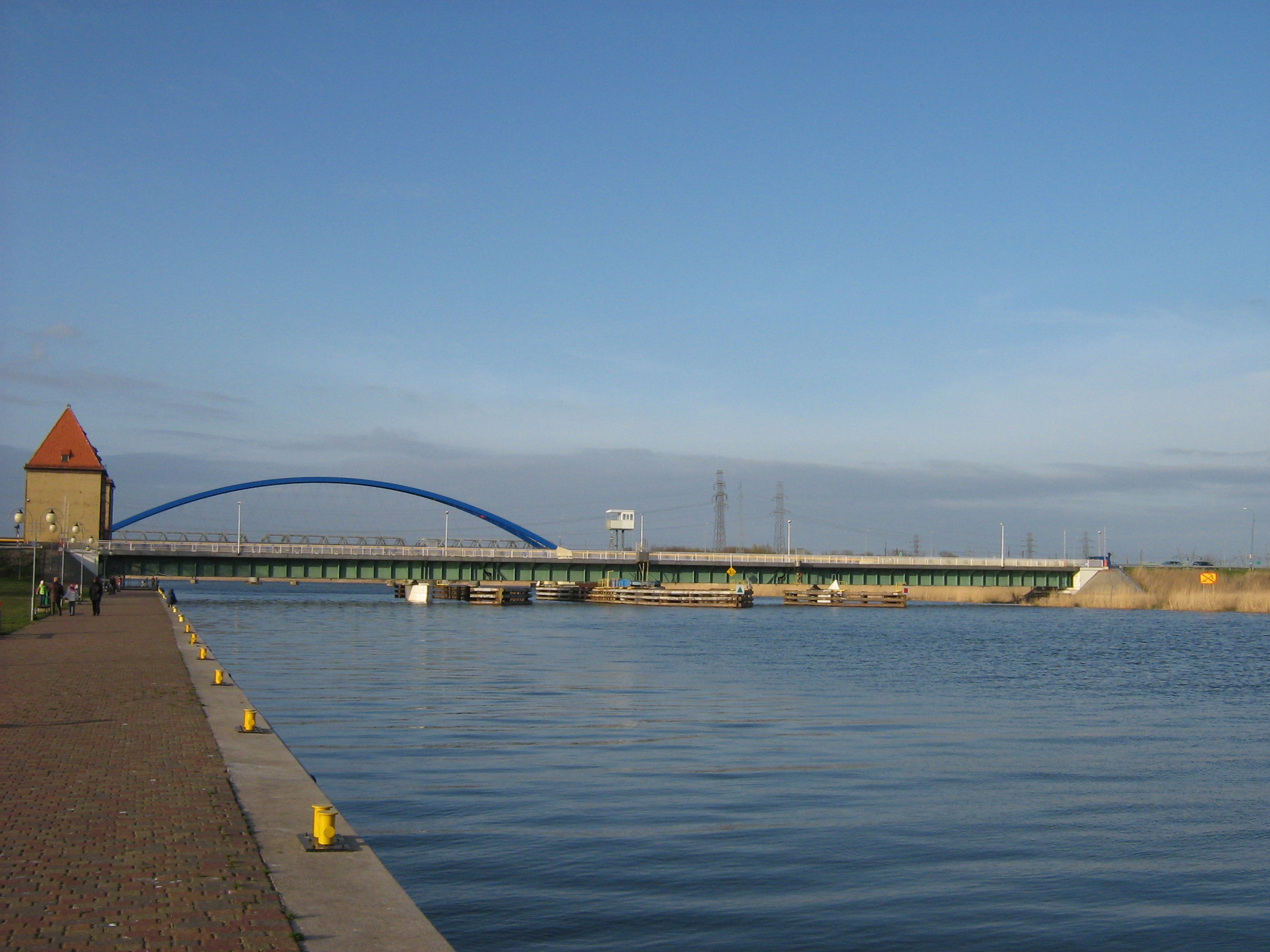
Dziwna strait in Wolin

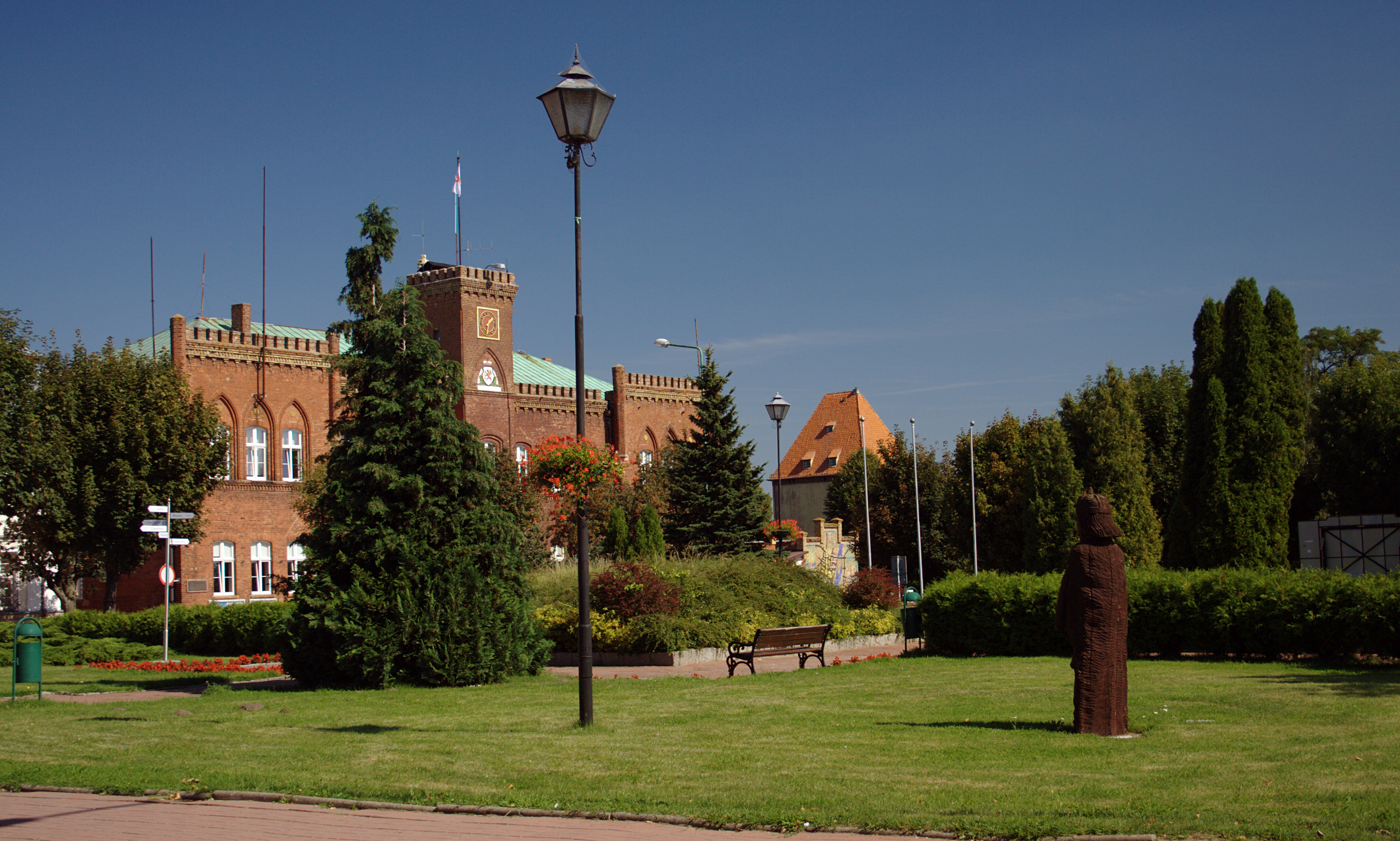
Town centre with the town hall

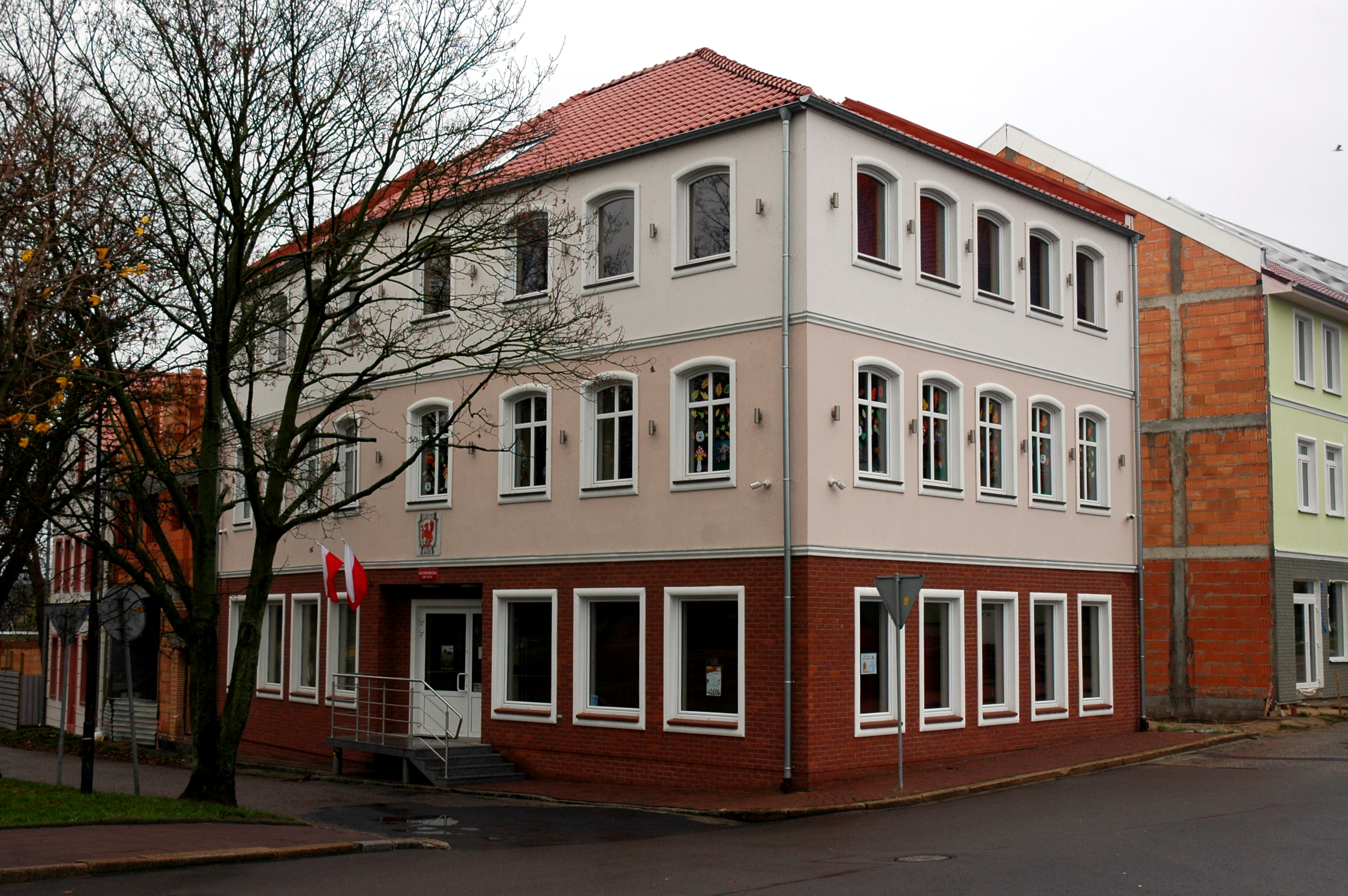
Library

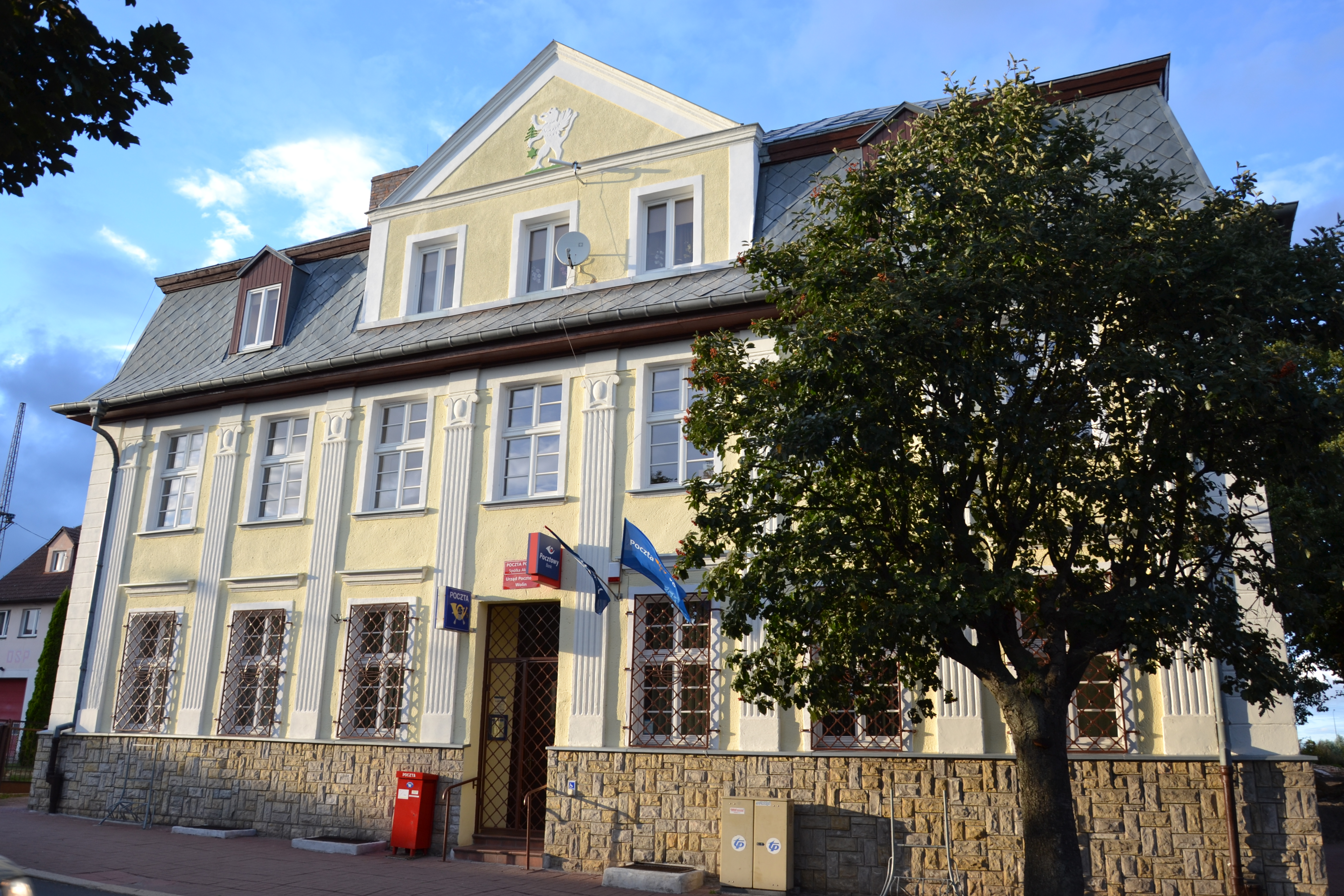
Post office

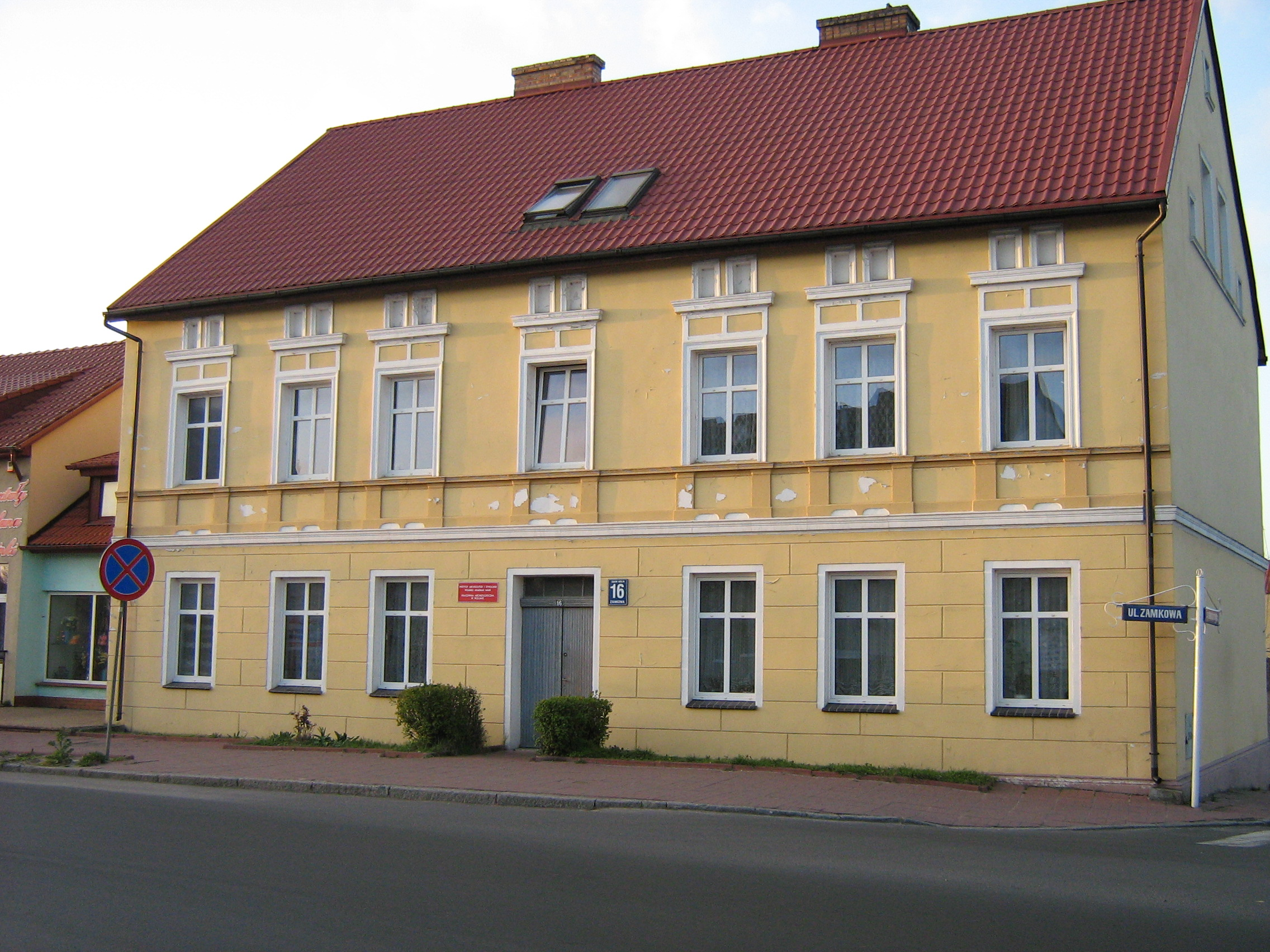
Institute of Archeology and Ethnology of the Polish Academy of Sciences

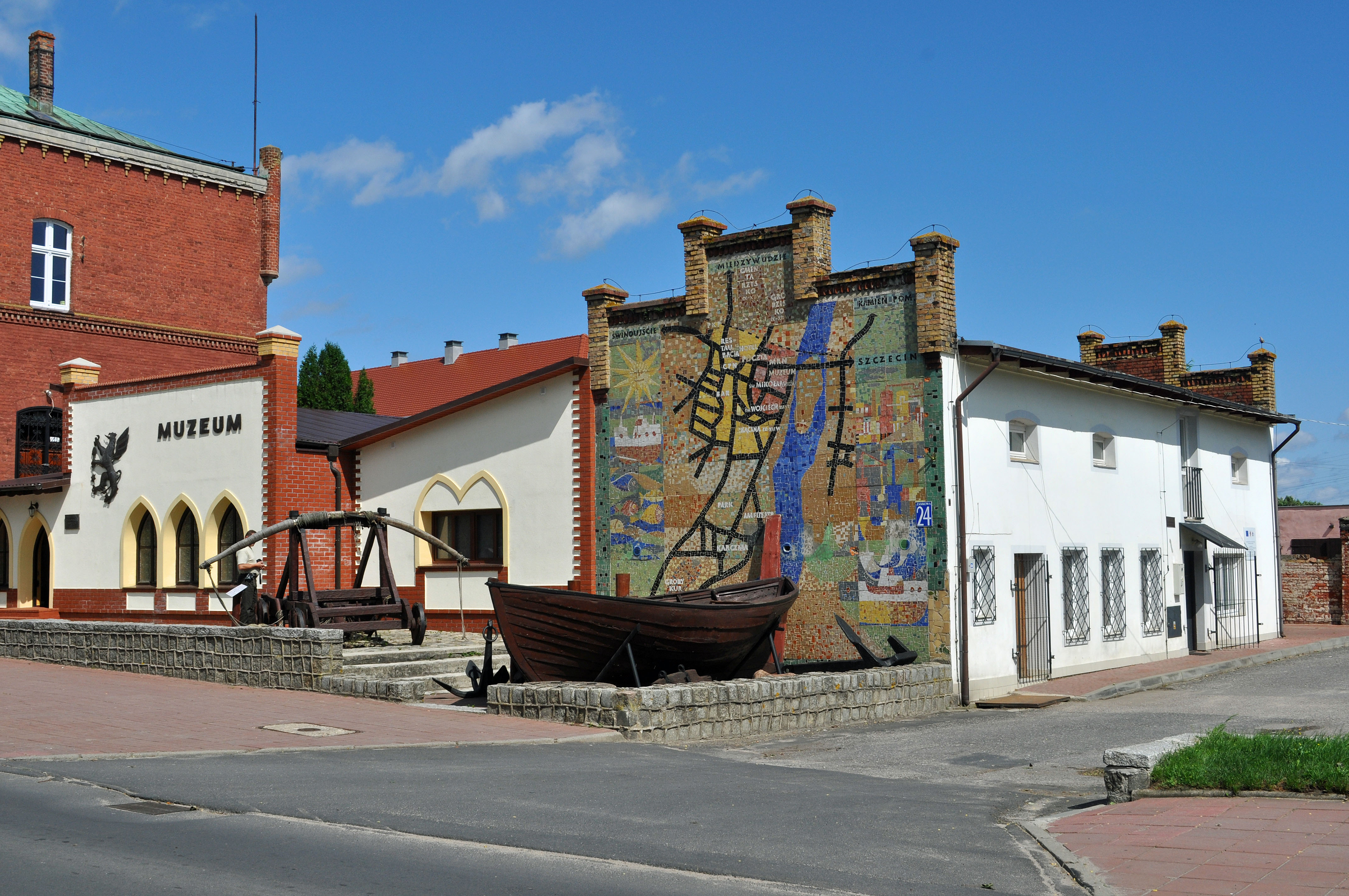
Regional Museum

== Notable people ==
Historical population
Year	Pop.	±%
1871	4,978	—
1880	5,506	+10.6%
1890	4,965	−9.8%
1900	4,679	−5.8%
1910	4,537	−3.0%
1925	4,723	+4.1%
1939	4,800	+1.6%
1950	1,361	−71.6%
1960	2,435	+78.9%
2010	4,842	+98.9%

- Johannes Bugenhagen (1485–1558) introduced the Protestant Reformation in the Duchy of Pomerania and Denmark
- Anna Maria of Brandenburg (1567–1618 in Wollin) Princess of Brandenburg by birth and marriage Duchess of Pomerania.
- Ferdinand Wittmann (1836–1868), German six-fold poisoner who used arsenic, ran a bookbindery in Wollin
- Ernst Georg Ferdinand Küster (1839–1930), German surgeon, developed modern radical mastoidectomy for treatment of chronic ear disease
- Gertrud Meissner (1895–1985), German medical doctor, she worked on medical bacteriology, serology and the chemotherapy of tuberculosis
- Robert Rozanski (born 1961), Norwegian sprint canoer who competed 1984 Summer Olympics
- Marzena Cieślik (born 1981), Polish model
- Ania Malinowska (born 1979), cultural theorist, poet and author

== Twin towns ==
Staffanstorp, Sweden	Usedom, Germany	Venansault, France

== Works cited ==
- Bonnesen, Sten (1924). Karl X Gustav [Charles X Gustav] (in Swedish). Gleerups.
