= Kamień County =

Kamień County Powiat kamieński
- County
- Flag Coat of arms

- Location within the voivodeship

- Division into gminas
- Coordinates (Kamień Pomorski): 53°58′11″N 14°47′9″E
- Country: Poland
- Voivodeship: West Pomeranian
- Seat: Kamień Pomorski
- Gminas: Total 6: Gmina Dziwnów; Gmina Golczewo; Gmina Kamień Pomorski; Gmina Misdroy; Gmina Świerzno; Gmina Wolin

Area
  - Total: 1,006.65 km^{2} (388.67 sq mi)

Population (2006)
  - Total: 47,604
  - Density: 47.290/km^{2} (122.48/sq mi)
  - Urban: 25,121
  - Rural: 22,483
- Car plates: ZKA
- Website: www.powiatkamienski.pl

Kamień County (Polish: powiat kamieński) is a unit of territorial administration and local government (powiat) in West Pomeranian Voivodeship, north-western Poland, on the Baltic coast. It existed from 1945 to 1975 and was re-established in its current form on January 1, 1999, as a result of the Polish local government reforms passed in 1998. Its administrative seat and largest town is Kamień Pomorski, which lies 63 kilometres (39 mi) north of the regional capital Szczecin. The county contains four other towns: Międzyzdroje, 23 km (14 mi) west of Kamień Pomorski, Wolin, 19 km (12 mi) south-west of Kamień Pomorski, Dziwnów, 6 km (4 mi) north-west of Kamień Pomorski, and Golczewo, 21 km (13 mi) south-east of Kamień Pomorski.

The county covers an area of 1,006.65 square kilometres (388.7 sq mi). As of 2006, its total population is 47,604, out of which the population of Kamień Pomorski is 9,134, that of Misdroy is 5,436, that of Wolin is 4,878, that of Dziwnów is 2,949, that of Golczewo is 2,724, and the rural population is 22,483.

== Neighbouring counties ==
Kamień County is bordered by Gryfice County to the east, Goleniów County to the south and the city of Świnoujście to the west. It also borders the Baltic Sea to the north.

== Administrative divisions ==
The county is subdivided into six gminas (five urban-rural and one rural). These are listed in the following table, in descending order of population.

Gmina	Type	Area (km^{2})	Population (2006)	Seat
Gmina Kamień Pomorski	urban-rural	208.6	14,389	Kamień Pomorski
Gmina Wolin	urban-rural	327.4	12,351	Wolin
Gmina Międzyzdroje	urban-rural	117.2	6,477	Międzyzdroje
Gmina Golczewo	urban-rural	175.4	6,065	Golczewo
Gmina Świerzno	rural	140.2	4,174	Świerzno
Gmina Dziwnów	urban-rural	37.9	4,148	Dziwnów
