= EV10 Baltic Sea Cycle Route =

Long-distance cycling route in Europe

EuroVelo 10
- EV10 in Kołobrzeg, Poland
- Length: 9,100 km (5,700 mi)
- Location: Poland, Germany, Denmark, Sweden, Finland, Russia, Estonia, Latvia, Lithuania
- Designation: EuroVelo 10 (EV10)
- Use: Cycling
- Website: en.eurovelo.com/ev10

Outline of EuroVelo 10 around the Baltic Sea (historical version from May 2009)

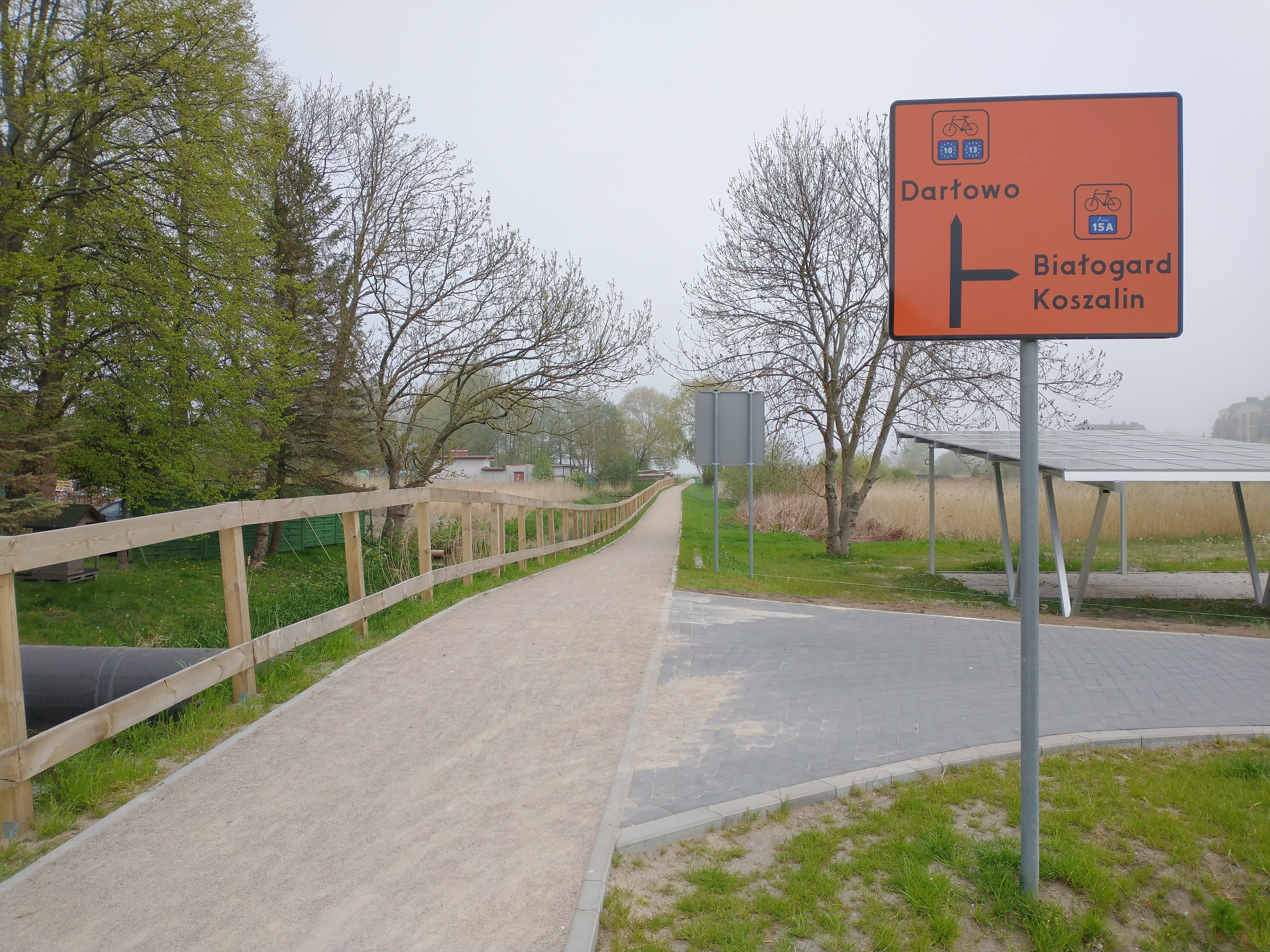
EV10 and EV13 in Mielno, Poland

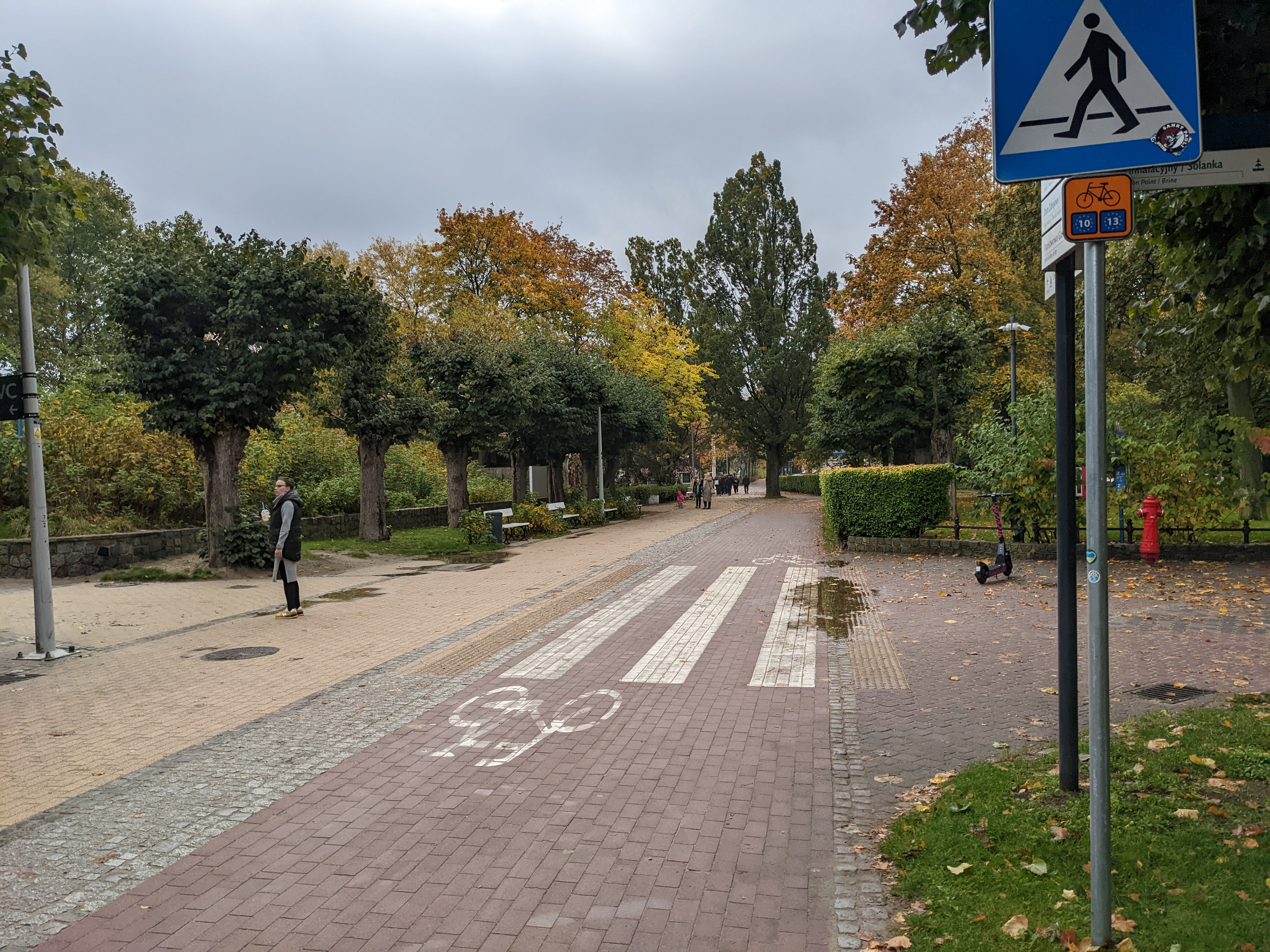
EV10 and EV13 in Sopot, Poland

EuroVelo 10 (EV10), the Baltic Sea Cycle Route (historically also the Hansa Circuit), is an international circular long-distance cycling route in the EuroVelo network, running around the Baltic Sea basin. The route is approximately 9,100 km long and passes through nine countries. In Poland, EV10 passes through the West Pomeranian, Pomeranian and Warmian–Masurian voivodeships. An international assessment conducted in 2024–2025 surveyed 585 km of the Polish section.

== History and development ==
EuroVelo 10 was among the first twelve routes proposed for the EuroVelo network in 1995; the EuroVelo initiative itself was officially launched on 21 November 1997 in Logroño. In Poland, the route was first waymarked as R10 in the early 21st century, largely along existing roads and forest tracks. Coordinated upgrading of the Polish section began in 2017.

The historical name Hansa Circuit refers to the historical ties between towns around the Baltic, including Hanseatic cities such as Lübeck and Gdańsk. EuroVelo organisers used this name alongside Baltic Sea Cycle Route; the route also passes through five Baltic capitals: Copenhagen, Stockholm, Helsinki, Tallinn and Riga.

Development of the southern section of EV10 was supported by the Interreg project Biking South Baltic, implemented in 2017–2019. Its activities included surveying the route in Poland, Germany and Denmark, user research, traffic counts and preparing a route development strategy for 2020–2030.

In 2019, a 105 km section on the Danish island of Bornholm was incorporated into the official EV10 alignment.

The Baltic Biking UPGRADE project began on 1 September 2023 and ran until 31 August 2026. It was undertaken by partners from countries along the route and the European Cyclists' Federation. The lead partner was the Pomeranian Regional Tourist Organisation. Its objectives included harmonising route management and developing tourism services provided by small and medium-sized enterprises.

In June 2026, as one of the project's outcomes, a one-way bicycle rental service between Copenhagen and Gdańsk was launched, allowing riders to return a bicycle in a different country. The service was developed by OneWayBikeTours and Poland by Locals.

== Route ==
=== Poland ===
The principal EV10 alignment in Poland passes through the following towns and landmarks:

Świnoujście – Łunowo – Międzyzdroje – Warnowo – Wisełka – Kołczewo – Dziwnów – Dziwnówek – Łukęcin – Pobierowo – Rewal – Niechorze – Pogorzelica – Mrzeżyno – Rogowo – Dźwirzyno – Kołobrzeg – Ustronie Morskie – Gąski – Sarbinowo – Mielno – Łazy – Dąbki – Darłowo – Wicie – Jarosławiec – Ustka – Poddąbie – Rowy – Smołdzino – Główczyce – Łeba – Sasino – Białogóra – Dębki – Sławoszyno – Puck – Rzucewo – Gdynia – Sopot – Gdańsk – Przejazdowo – Wiślinka – Świbno – Świbno–Mikoszewo ferry – Mikoszewo – Jantar – Nowy Dwór Gdański – Elbląg – Tolkmicko – Frombork – Braniewo – Gronowo.

At the easternmost part of the Polish route, near the border with Kaliningrad Oblast, EV10 partly shares its alignment with the Green Velo Eastern Poland Cycling Trail.

In Pomerania, the main route bypasses Władysławowo and the Hel Peninsula, running from Puck via Swarzewo, Gnieżdżewo, Łebcz and Sławoszyno. A connecting route waymarked R10 serves the Hel Peninsula, running from Karwieńskie Błota via Władysławowo and Jastarnia to Hel. A separate R10 connecting route crosses the Vistula Spit from Jantar via Stegna, Sztutowo and Krynica Morska.

=== Other countries ===
Outside Poland, EV10 includes sections directly along the Baltic Sea as well as stretches through inland towns, islands and peninsulas. It passes through the following regions and settlements.

==== Kaliningrad Oblast (Russia) ====
From the border crossing at Gronowo and Mamonovo, the described alignment follows the A194 road towards Kaliningrad, then towards the coast via Svetlogorsk and Zelenogradsk. It continues across the Curonian Spit, via Morskoye, to the Lithuanian border near Nida.

==== Lithuania ====
EV10 on the Lithuanian side of the Curonian Spit

The route runs from the Russian border via Nida, Juodkrantė and Smiltynė on the Curonian Spit, crosses the Klaipėda Strait, and then passes through Klaipėda, Palanga and Būtingė to the Latvian border. The Lithuanian section is linked to the coastal cycle route (Lithuanian: Pajūrio dviračių trasa); on the Curonian Spit, EV10 overlaps with EuroVelo 13.

==== Latvia ====
After crossing the Lithuanian border, EV10 passes through Liepāja. In Courland, the alignment includes coastal areas and the settlements of Pāvilosta and Jūrkalne, as well as inland Kuldīga, the vicinity of Ventspils and Talsi, Sabile, Kandava and Tukums. The route then passes through Jūrmala and Riga, before turning through areas near Ropaži, Sigulda and Limbaži towards the coast of the Gulf of Riga. It reaches the Estonian border near Salacgrīva and Ainaži.

==== Estonia ====
After crossing the Latvian border, the route travels via Pärnu to the port of Virtsu, from which a ferry serves the island of Muhu. It then passes through Saaremaa, including Kuressaare, and Hiiumaa. After returning to the mainland, it continues to Haapsalu, via Nõva, Padise and Laulasmaa to Tallinn. East of the capital, the alignment runs near Lahemaa National Park and then passes the area of Kohtla-Järve and Sillamäe before reaching Narva on the Russian border. In Estonia, EV10 uses National Cycle Route 1, which extends for approximately 981 km along this part of the route.

==== Leningrad Oblast (Russia) ====
East of Narva, the route enters Russia through Ivangorod, and its proposed alignment passes via Kingisepp towards Saint Petersburg. Route descriptions noted that a single, fully defined EV10 alignment had not been established in Leningrad Oblast. A coastal route along the Gulf of Finland is complicated by restricted access to military areas and sites near Sosnovy Bor and the Leningrad Nuclear Power Plant. Historical proposals to avoid these restrictions included following the European R1 cycle route and returning to the Gulf of Finland coast near Petergof. The route then proceeds through Saint Petersburg towards Vyborg and the Finnish border.

==== Finland ====
From the Russian border near Vaalimaa and Virolahti, EV10 passes through Hamina, Kotka, Ruotsinpyhtää and Porvoo to Helsinki, using parts of Finnish National Cycle Route 7. Between Helsinki and Turku, it follows National Cycle Route 1 via Kirkkonummi, Pohja and Salo. It then passes through Naantali, Merimasku, Taivassalo, Uusikaupunki, Rauma, Eurajoki and Luvia to Pori. Continuing north along Finland's western coast, it runs through Vaasa, Oulu and Keminmaa to Tornio near the Swedish border. Descriptions of the national cycling network also mention the use of Routes 8, 4 and 21 north of Pori.

==== Sweden ====
After crossing the border at Haparanda, EV10 follows the western shore of the Gulf of Bothnia and Sweden's eastern coast via Kalix, Luleå, Piteå, Skellefteå, Umeå, Örnsköldsvik, Sundsvall, Hudiksvall, Söderhamn, Gävle, Österbybruk, Norrtälje and Täby to Stockholm. It then continues via Tumba, Trosa, Nyköping, Söderköping, Valdemarsvik, Loftahammar, Västervik, Figeholm, Oskarshamn, Mönsterås, Timmernabben, the vicinity of Kalmar, Torsås, Jämjö and Nättraby to Karlskrona and Karlshamn. The southern section passes through Pukavik, Sölvesborg, Åhus, Simrishamn, Ystad, Trelleborg and Malmö. The route uses sections of the traditional Cykelspåret längs ostkusten cycle route, and in southern Sweden it also follows the national Sydostleden and Sydkustleden routes.

==== Denmark ====
From Sweden, EV10 reaches Copenhagen on the island of Zealand, then heads south via Køge, Faxe Ladeplads and Præstø to Kalvehave. It continues across the islands of Møn (including Stege), Bogø, Falster (Marielyst and Nykøbing Falster) and Lolland (Maribo and Nakskov). The western alignment passes through Langeland, Tåsinge, Funen with Svendborg, Fåborg, Assens and Middelfart, as well as the islands of Ærø and Als, on which the centre of Sønderborg is located. On Jutland, the route passes through Kolding, Christiansfeld, Haderslev, Aabenraa and Gråsten before reaching the German border near Kruså and Padborg. It follows Danish National Cycle Route 8 (Østersøruten) and, on Zealand, also Route 9.

A separate part of EV10 is the loop around Bornholm, corresponding to Danish National Cycle Route 10 (Bornholm Rundt). It passes through Rønne, Hasle, Allinge, Gudhjem, Svaneke, Nexø and Dueodde.

==== Germany ====
From the Danish border near Flensburg, EV10 follows the Flensburg Fjord via Glücksburg, Kappeln and Eckernförde to Kiel. It continues via Hohwacht and Heiligenhafen to the island of Fehmarn; after circling the island, it proceeds via Dahme, Kellenhusen, Grömitz, Neustadt in Holstein and Travemünde to Lübeck. In Mecklenburg-Vorpommern, it runs via Wismar, Kühlungsborn, Warnemünde and the Fischland-Darß-Zingst peninsula to Stralsund, from where it continues across the island of Rügen. The route then reaches Greifswald, Usedom and Ahlbeck, linking to the Polish section at Świnoujście. The German EV10 section coincides with national D-Route 2, known as the Ostseeküstenroute or Ostseeküsten-Radweg, part of the German Cycling Network (Radnetz Deutschland).

=== Route restrictions and alternatives to the Russian sections ===
The full GPX file published by EuroVelo includes both completed sections and sections still under construction or in planning. A separate track is made available for sections classified as developed.

According to the official EuroVelo website, as of July 2026 the Finnish–Russian border remained closed and crossings of the Estonian–Russian border were subject to restrictions. Cyclists were advised to bypass the Russian section around the Gulf of Finland by taking the ferry between Helsinki and Tallinn.

Due to travel restrictions affecting Kaliningrad Oblast, EuroVelo also presents an alternative 527 km connection from Neringa in Lithuania to Braniewo in Poland. This alignment bypasses Russia and is provided with its own GPX track, but does not form part of the official EV10 route.

== Ferry and inter-island connections ==
EV10 relies not only on cycling infrastructure but also on ferries and crossings of straits. These links are particularly important on the Danish islands, western Estonia and the Gulf of Finland area.

- Denmark – the route across Als, Ærø, Funen, Tåsinge, Langeland, Lolland, Falster, Bogø, Møn and Zealand uses both bridges and ferries. Crossings described along the route include Fynshav–Søby, Ærøskøbing–Svendborg and Spodsbjerg–Tårs. The official Danish cycle-route service identifies three ferry crossings along the island route.
- Bornholm – the island's National Cycle Route 10 loop is a separate section of EV10, accessible via ferry connections including those to Rønne.
- Estonia – the main route uses ferries from Virtsu to Muhu, between Saaremaa and Hiiumaa, and from Hiiumaa to the mainland. These make it possible to cycle across Estonia's largest western islands.
- Lithuania – the link between Smiltynė on the Curonian Spit and Klaipėda crosses the Klaipėda Strait by ferry.
- Poland – the route uses, among others, the Świbno–Mikoszewo ferry across the Vistula.
- Finland and Estonia – ferries between Helsinki and Tallinn offer an alternative to the Russian route around the Gulf of Finland.
- Denmark and Sweden – bicycles may be taken on trains between Copenhagen and Malmö using the Øresund Bridge; this connection replaces the need to cycle across the strait.

== Connections to other cycle routes ==
=== National route networks and waymarking ===
Sign for international EuroVelo route 10

EV10 is not a separately constructed cycle path throughout its entire length. In individual countries, it uses national or regional cycle routes, public roads and dedicated cycling infrastructure. Accordingly, route numbers, colours and signs vary by country, and local waymarking may appear independently of the EuroVelo symbol.

| Country | National or regional routes and designations used by EV10 | Characteristics |
|---|---|---|
| Germany | D-Route 2 – Ostseeküstenroute (Ostseeküsten-Radweg) | Part of the German Cycling Network (Radnetz Deutschland); uses German Baltic coast cycle route waymarking. |
| Denmark | National Route 8 – Østersøruten; No. 9 – Gedser–Helsingør; No. 10 – Bornholm Rundt | Route 8 crosses the Danish islands; Route 9 connects the route with Copenhagen, and Route 10 forms a loop around Bornholm. Waymarking follows the Danish national cycle-route system. |
| Sweden | Cykelspåret längs ostkusten; Sydostleden (No. 2) and Sydkustleden (No. 3) | Parts of Sweden's touring network are used; Sydostleden and Sydkustleden are signed with red-and-white national-route signs and numbers. |
| Finland | National Routes 7, 1, 8, 4 and 21 | Route descriptions identify No. 7 east of Helsinki, No. 1 between Helsinki and Turku, and Nos. 8, 4 and 21 near the Gulf of Bothnia coast. |
| Estonia | National Cycle Route 1 | EV10 coincides with Estonia's Route 1, including sections across the western islands. |
| Latvia | EV10, locally also EV13 and local cycle-route signs | The alignment combines coastal stretches with inland sections of Courland and the Riga area. |
| Lithuania | EV10, EV13 and Pajūrio dviračių trasa | The coastal cycle route is used on the Curonian Spit and the Lithuanian coast; EV10 partly overlaps EV13. |
| Russia | EV10 and planned or partially described sections; R1 has also been mentioned in Leningrad Oblast | There is no unified description of waymarking for both Russian sections, and travel is restricted. |
| Poland | EV10/EV13; historical R10; regional Velo Baltica; also Green Velo in the east | EV10 and EV13 markings, older R10 signs and connecting routes, including those near the Hel Peninsula and Vistula Spit. Near Kaliningrad Oblast, EV10 partly shares the Green Velo alignment. |

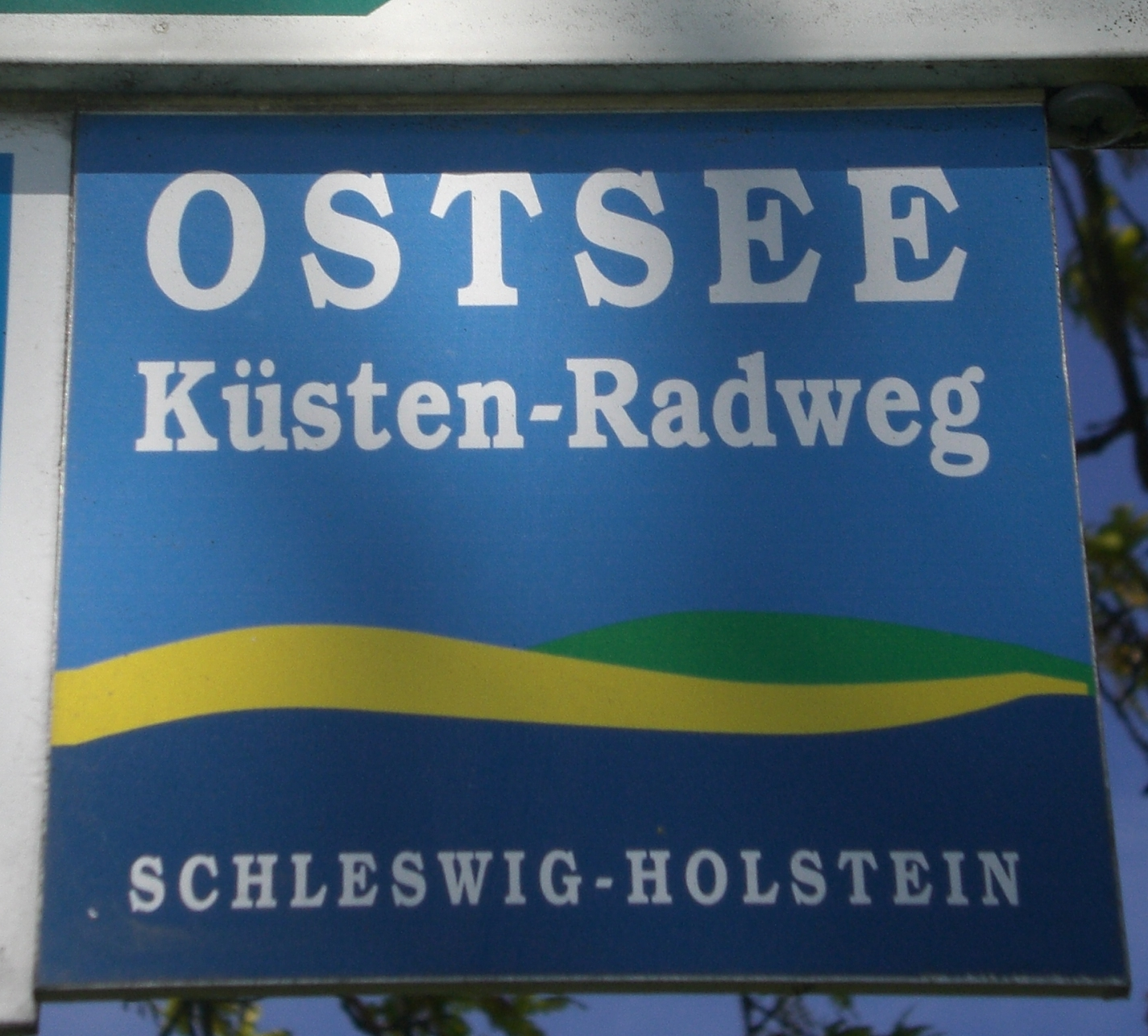
An example of German Baltic coast cycle-route waymarking

EV10 waymarking in Neuvoton near Hamina, Finland

In Sweden, Sydostleden is National Route 2 and Sydkustleden is National Route 3; these numbers are distinct from the international EV10 number. On Bornholm, National Route 10 is marked by green Cykelvej direction signs. Both international and national cycle-route signs are used in Finland and Estonia.

=== Connections with other EuroVelo routes ===
EV10 connects with other routes in the EuroVelo network, sometimes sharing the same alignment. Notable connections include:

- EuroVelo 3 – in the Flensburg area and near Kruså at the German–Danish border.
- EuroVelo 7 – near Copenhagen and Nykøbing Falster, as well as at Warnemünde in Germany; network diagrams also show northern junctions in Sweden.
- EuroVelo 9 – in Gdańsk, the northern terminus of the route leading towards the Adriatic Sea.
- EuroVelo 11 – in Tallinn and near Helsinki, where EV10 meets the north–south cycle route network in eastern Europe.
- EuroVelo 13 – numerous overlapping or neighbouring sections along the southern and eastern shores of the Baltic Sea, including in Poland and Lithuania.

== Development status and infrastructure ==
In the 2025 EuroVelo Route Development Status Report, 18% of EV10 was classified as developed, with a further 35% classified as developed and signed as EuroVelo. Sections under development or requiring further development accounted for 45%, while planned sections accounted for 2%. No section of EV10 was listed as certified under the European Certification Standard.

Between July 2024 and June 2025, 2,637 km of EV10 were audited in Sweden, Lithuania, Poland, Germany and Denmark. On the surveyed sections, 53% of the route was completely separated from motor traffic, and 82% of surfaces were rated good or very good. However, the entire surveyed alignment failed to meet certification requirements because of missing signs, dangerous or impassable stretches and gaps in infrastructure continuity.

=== Poland ===
- West Pomeranian Voivodeship – the regional section known as Velo Baltica is approximately 235 km long and largely overlaps with EuroVelo 13. The audit covered 233 km. Approximately 73% of the route was free of motor traffic, 84% had a hard surface, including 59% asphalt. The route has EuroVelo waymarking. Problematic stretches included forest paths between Świnoujście and Międzyzdroje and in Wolin National Park. On 30 July 2026, a pedestrian and bicycle footbridge across the channel at Lake Kopań was opened, eliminating one of the gaps on the Darłowo–Ustka section.
- Pomeranian Voivodeship – the audit covered approximately 305 km. Asphalt surfaces accounted for about 61% of the route, stabilised gravel for 18%, and concrete paving blocks and slabs for 15%. Approximately 78% of the surfaces were rated good or very good. The route is marked with EV10 and EV13 signs, and there were 32 cyclist service areas along the Pomeranian section. Poorer stretches included sandy tracks near Ulinia and worn concrete slabs in Słowiński National Park.
- Warmian–Masurian Voivodeship – the audit identified this as the least coherent section of the Polish EV10 in terms of infrastructure. Gravel roads and locally damaged surfaces occurred, and the route lacked continuous EuroVelo waymarking.

== Bicycle traffic ==
Automatic bicycle counters record passages along the route. The following table includes ten measurement points on EV10 and EV13 in the West Pomeranian and Pomeranian voivodeships. Figures represent passages past a counter, not unique cyclists, and are rounded to the nearest thousand.

The counter in Kmiecin, in Gmina Nowy Dwór Gdański, is located on a section signed EV10/EV13; it was installed in 2018.

Recorded bicycle passages
| Counting location | 2022 | 2023 | 2024 | 2025 |
|---|---|---|---|---|
| Świnoujście | 795,000 | 765,000 | 783,000 | 751,000 |
| Kołczewo | 54,000 | 63,000 | 70,000 | 67,000 |
| Rogowo | 187,000 | 186,000 | 208,000 | 208,000 |
| Sarbinowo | 200,000 | 203,000 | 215,000 | 210,000 |
| Mielno | — | 81,000 (Note: Data cover 31 May to 31 December 2023.) | 112,000 | 100,000 |
| Darłowo | 95,000 | 96,000 | 104,000 | 95,000 |
| Poddąbie | 45,000 | 38,000 | 55,000 | 52,000 |
| Puck | 101,000 | 117,000 | 129,000 | 114,000 |
| Przejazdowo | 92,000 | 111,000 | 126,000 | 87,000 |
| Kmiecin | 35,000 | 34,000 | 34,000 | 28,000 |

== Gallery ==
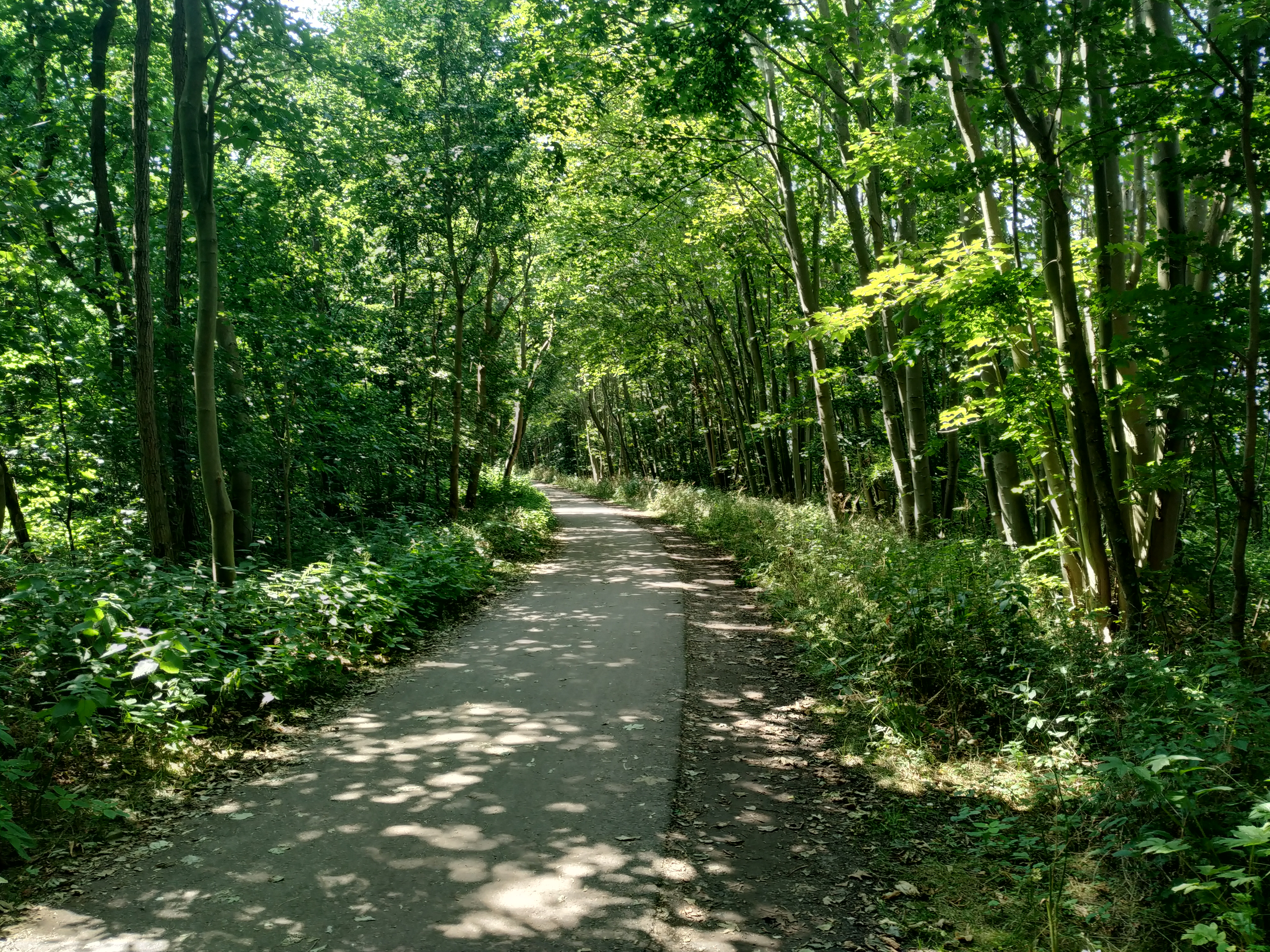
Cycle route in a coastal forest near Rostock, Germany

Cycle path near Barendorf, Germany

Cycle-route waymarking on Usedom in Świnoujście, Poland

Estonian cycle-route sign design

== See also ==
- EuroVelo
- EuroVelo 13
- Green Velo
