= Green Velo =

Long-distance cycling route in eastern Poland

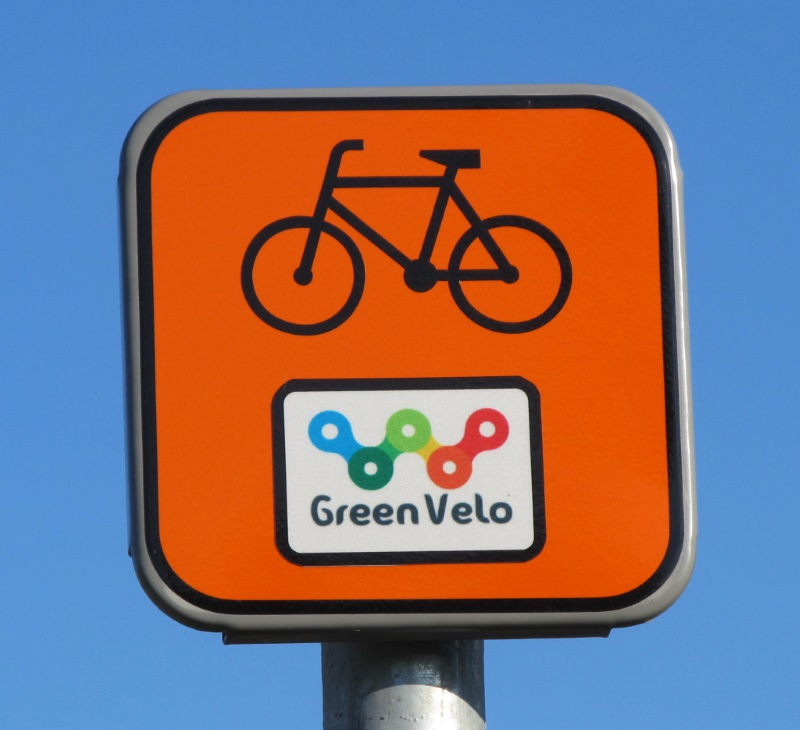
- Green Velo route signage
- Length: 2,079.5 km (1,292.1 mi)
- Location: Warmian–Masurian Voivodeship, Podlaskie Voivodeship, Lublin Voivodeship, Subcarpathian Voivodeship, Świętokrzyskie Voivodeship, Poland
- Trailheads: Elbląg – Końskie
- Use: Cycling
- Surface: Paved roads, cycleways, gravel and unpaved roads
- Website: greenvelo.pl/en

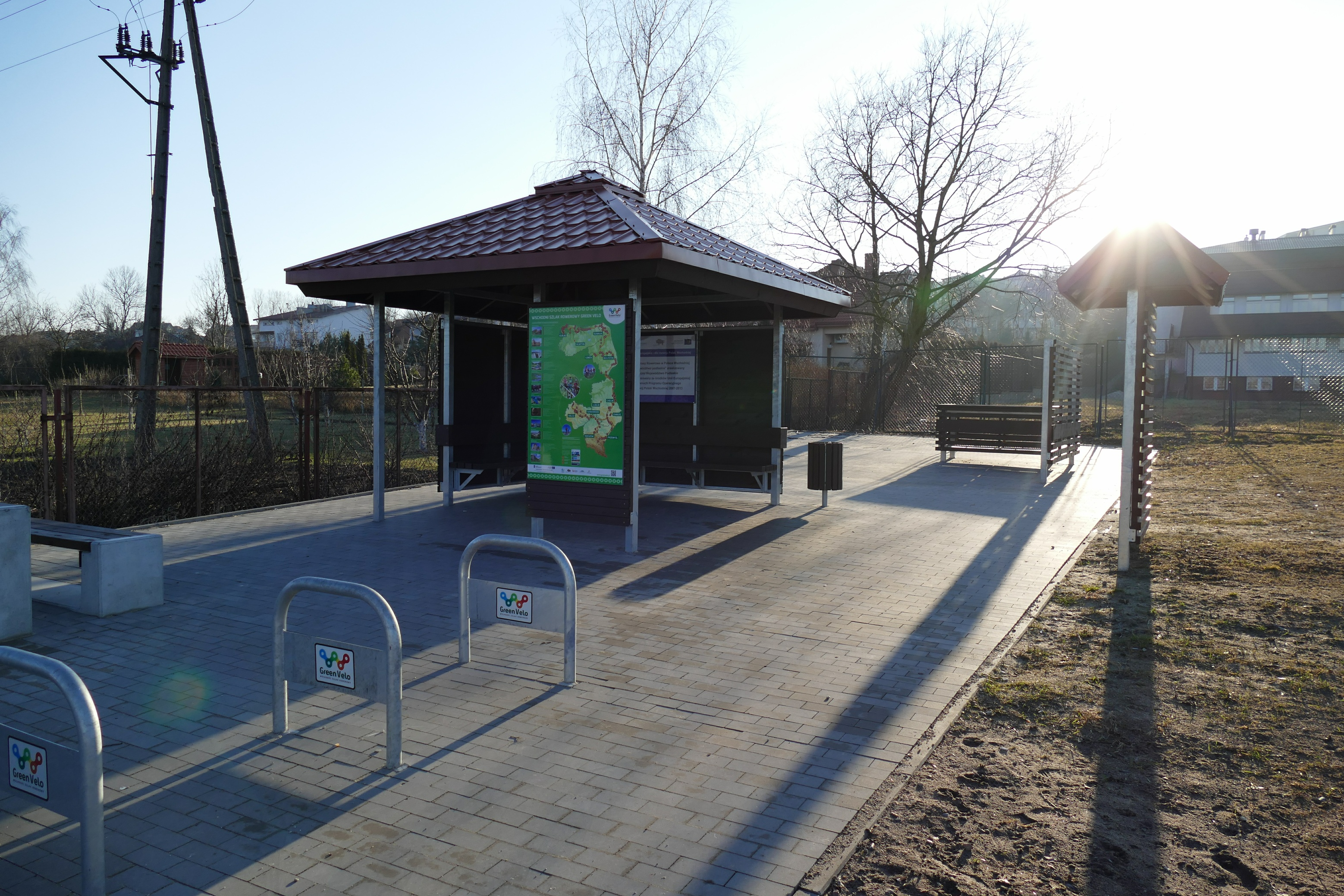
A cyclist service area on the Green Velo route in Łomża

Green Velo (Wschodni Szlak Rowerowy Green Velo, literally "Eastern Cycle Route Green Velo") is a long-distance cycle route running from Elbląg to Końskie through five voivodeships in eastern Poland: Warmian–Masurian, Podlaskie, Lublin, Subcarpathian and Świętokrzyskie. It has been described as the longest continuously signposted cycle route in Poland.

The main route is 1,887.5 km (1,172.8 mi) long, while branch and connecting routes account for another 192 km (119 mi), giving a total of 2,079.5 km (1,292.1 mi) of routes signposted as part of the project. Published figures vary slightly; earlier Green Velo materials gave a total length of 2,071 km (1,287 mi).

== History ==
Green Velo was created as part of the Trasy rowerowe w Polsce Wschodniej ("Cycle Routes in Eastern Poland") project, implemented as an infrastructure and promotional programme under the Operational Programme Development of Eastern Poland 2007–2013. Preparatory work included a study of the proposed main route corridor, an inventory of existing cycle routes and tourist attractions, and analysis of planning conditions. The route alignment was developed in 2008–2009, while the feasibility study was completed in 2012.

The infrastructure component was implemented between 2012 and 2015. It included the designation and signposting of more than 2,000 km (1,200 mi) of routes, construction and reconstruction of cycling infrastructure, and provision of associated facilities. The project involved all five voivodeships and more than 200 partners.

=== Development status ===
By October 2015, approximately 700 km (430 mi) of the route had been completed and opened. At the beginning of December 2015, construction of the Warmian–Masurian section had been completed and technical acceptance procedures were under way, while final acceptance, signposting and finishing works were being carried out in the other voivodeships.

The main investment phase was completed in December 2015. Since then, the route has been in an operational, maintenance and development phase. An audit conducted several years after completion by Poland's Supreme Audit Office (NIK) found that the route remained passable, although deficiencies were identified in the maintenance of some infrastructure and signage.

Local road repairs and upgrades have continued after completion of the original project. One example is the reconstruction, begun in 2025, of the Tereszpol-Zaorenda–Bukownica county road carrying part of the Green Velo route.

== Funding ==
The route was constructed under the Operational Programme Development of Eastern Poland 2007–2013, Priority Axis V "Sustainable development of tourism potential based on natural conditions", Measure V.2 "Cycle Routes".

The total value of the investment component was approximately 274 million złoty. About 85% was funded by the European Regional Development Fund, 10% by the Polish state budget, and 5% by the beneficiaries' own contributions. Expenditure included documentation, project management, fees, supervision, land acquisition and construction works.

Promotion of Green Velo was implemented as a separate project component. According to Wilczyński, more than 23 million złoty was allocated to marketing communications, with the main campaign continuing until the end of 2015.

== Route ==
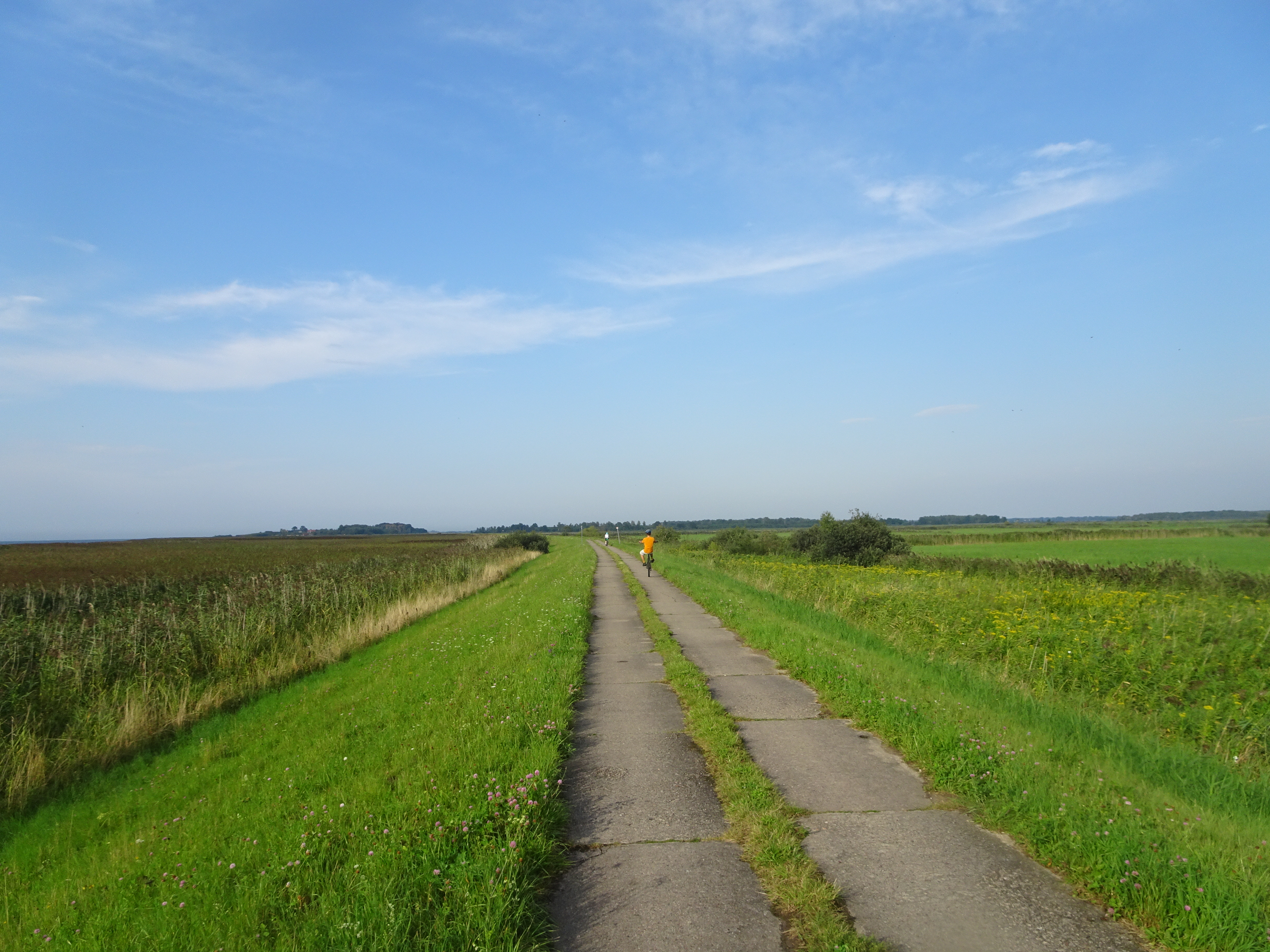
Green Velo between Frombork and Różaniec

The main route runs from Elbląg to Końskie. It is supplemented by branch and connecting routes providing access to transport hubs and major tourist attractions close to the main route.

From Elbląg, the route follows the Vistula Lagoon through Frombork and Braniewo, then continues through Warmia, northern Masuria and the Suwałki Region. It then crosses Podlachia, areas close to Poland's borders with Belarus and Ukraine, the Lublin region and Roztocze. Farther south it passes through Przemyśl, the Przemyśl Foothills, Dynów Foothills, Rzeszów, Łańcut and Leżajsk towards Sandomierz. The final section crosses the Świętokrzyskie Mountains, Kielce and the vicinity of Sielpia Wielka before reaching Końskie.

Voivodeship	Length	Selected towns and cities on or near the route
Warmian–Masurian	397 km (247 mi)	Elbląg – Frombork – Braniewo – Pieniężno – Lidzbark Warmiński – Bartoszyce – Węgorzewo – Gołdap
Podlaskie	598 km (372 mi)	Suwałki – Augustów – Osowiec-Twierdza – Łomża – Tykocin – Białystok – Supraśl – Hajnówka – Białowieża
Lublin	414 km (257 mi)	Włodawa – Chełm – Krasnystaw – Zwierzyniec
Subcarpathian	459 km (285 mi)	Horyniec-Zdrój – Przemyśl – Dynów – Rzeszów – Łańcut – Leżajsk
Świętokrzyskie	210 km (130 mi)	Sandomierz – Klimontów – Kielce – Oblęgorek – Sielpia Wielka – Końskie

The route passes through five national parks: Wigry National Park, Biebrza National Park, Narew National Park, Białowieża National Park and Roztocze National Park. It also passes through 15 landscape parks and 26 Special Protection Areas.

Most of the route crosses lowland terrain. More demanding sections occur in the Subcarpathian region, particularly between Rzeszów and Przemyśl, where the route crosses the Dynów and Przemyśl foothills. The Supreme Audit Office likewise described most of the route as not requiring exceptional skill or physical effort, apart from the more mountainous sections in Subcarpathia.

=== Cycling Kingdoms ===
For tourism development purposes, the areas surrounding Green Velo were divided into 12 so-called "Cycling Kingdoms" (Polish: Królestwa Rowerowe): Vistula Lagoon, Warmia and surroundings, Northern Masuria, Suwałki Region and Augustów Forest, Biebrza and Narew Valley, Białowieża and Knyszyn Forests, Bug Valley, Polesie, Roztocze, Carpathian Foothills, Sandomierz Land and Lower San Valley, and the Świętokrzyskie Mountains and surroundings.

=== Connections with other cycling routes ===
Green Velo connects with or shares sections with several international and regional cycle routes. Some of these connections involve corridors that are still planned or under development.

Voivodeship	Region	Connection or shared section	Route	Nature of connection
Warmian–Masurian	Żuławy Wiślane, Elbląg Upland, Vistula Lagoon	Elbląg – Frombork – Braniewo	EuroVelo 10 / EuroVelo 13	The routes use the same broad corridor as the initial section of Green Velo; EV10 and EV13 share a route in this part of Poland.
Warmian–Masurian	Żuławy Wiślane, Elbląg Upland, Warmia	Elbląg – Frombork – Braniewo	Euro-Route R1	R1 passes through Elbląg, Frombork and Braniewo, connecting with Green Velo and in places using the same corridor.
Warmian–Masurian	Vistula Lagoon area	Frombork – Braniewo	R64 Vistula Lagoon Cycle Route	A former connection with a route around the Vistula Lagoon. R64 was formally abolished by the Elbląg branch of the Polish Tourist and Sightseeing Society on 28 December 2018.
Warmian–Masurian	Żuławy Wiślane, Elbląg Canal region	Elbląg	Elbląg Canal Cycle Route	The route from Ostróda to Elbląg connects with Green Velo in Elbląg.
Warmian–Masurian	Warmia	Lidzbark Warmiński	Orneta–Lidzbark Warmiński Railway Cycle Route	A cycle route following a former railway line between Orneta and Lidzbark Warmiński connects with Green Velo near Lidzbark Warmiński.
Warmian–Masurian	Warmia	Lidzbark Warmiński–Wielochowo and Smolanka–Sępopol	Łynostrada	Łynostrada connects with Green Velo, with shared sections between Lidzbark Warmiński and Wielochowo and between Smolanka and Sępopol.
Warmian–Masurian	Great Masurian Lakes	Węgorzewo	Masurian Cycle Loop	The Masurian Cycle Loop meets Green Velo in Węgorzewo.
Podlaskie	Suwałki Region, Augustów Primeval Forest	around Augustów and the Augustów Forest	EuroVelo 11	Green Velo intersects and in places uses the same corridor as the R11/EuroVelo 11 route in the Augustów–Suwałki area.
Lublin	Roztocze	Zwierzyniec, Józefów–Hamernia and Oseredek–Podlesina	Central Roztocze Cycle Route	The routes intersect in Zwierzyniec and share sections between Józefów and Hamernia and between Oseredek and Podlesina.
Subcarpathian	Dynów Foothills, Przemyśl Foothills, Rzeszów	Rzeszów, Krzywcza, Przemyśl; shared corridors Rzeszów–Budziwój and Wola Węgierska–Przemyśl	EuroVelo 4	The regional cycling network concept provides for intersections with Green Velo in Rzeszów, Krzywcza and Przemyśl and shared sections of about 6 km (3.7 mi) between Rzeszów and Budziwój and 35 km (22 mi) between Wola Węgierska and Przemyśl. These connections concern a route corridor that is still being developed.
Subcarpathian	Wisłok valley, Rzeszów	Rzeszów, Białobrzegi; shared Budziwój–Rzeszów section	Velo Wisłok	The regional concept provides for intersections with Green Velo in Rzeszów and Białobrzegi and approximately 6 km (3.7 mi) of shared route between Budziwój and Rzeszów. Velo Wisłok is being developed as part of the regional cycling network.
Subcarpathian	San valley, Dynów Foothills, Przemyśl Foothills	Jabłonica Ruska, Dynów, Iskań, Krzywcza, Przemyśl, Niziny, Leżajsk, Radomyśl nad Sanem	Velo San	The planned Velo San corridor has numerous connections with Green Velo, with shared sections proposed between Jabłonica Ruska and Dynów, Iskań and Bachów, Krzywcza and Olszany, Ostrów and Niziny, and Leżajsk and Radomyśl nad Sanem. Velo San is being developed in stages.
Świętokrzyskie	Świętokrzyskie Mountains and surrounding area	Raków, Górki Szczukowskie, Porzecze	EuroVelo 11	The regional cycling-route concept provides for intersections between the future EuroVelo 11 corridor and Green Velo in Raków, Górki Szczukowskie and Porzecze. These links concern a planned section of EV11.
Świętokrzyskie	Vistula valley, Sandomierz	Zawisełcze–Sandomierz	Vistula Cycling Route	The Świętokrzyskie cycling-network concept provides for about 3 km (1.9 mi) of shared route between Green Velo and the Vistula Cycling Route from Zawisełcze to Sandomierz.

== Infrastructure ==
=== Roads and engineering structures ===
Approximately 300 km (190 mi) of Green Velo consists of newly built or reconstructed cycleways and shared pedestrian–cycle paths, while nearly 150 km (93 mi) consists of upgraded unpaved roads. More than 30 bridges and footbridges were constructed or renovated and more than 20 major junctions were reconstructed as part of the project.

Most of the route, however, uses existing roads of varying classifications and surfaces, including public roads, unpaved roads, shared pedestrian–cycle paths and segregated cycleways.

=== Cyclist Service Areas ===
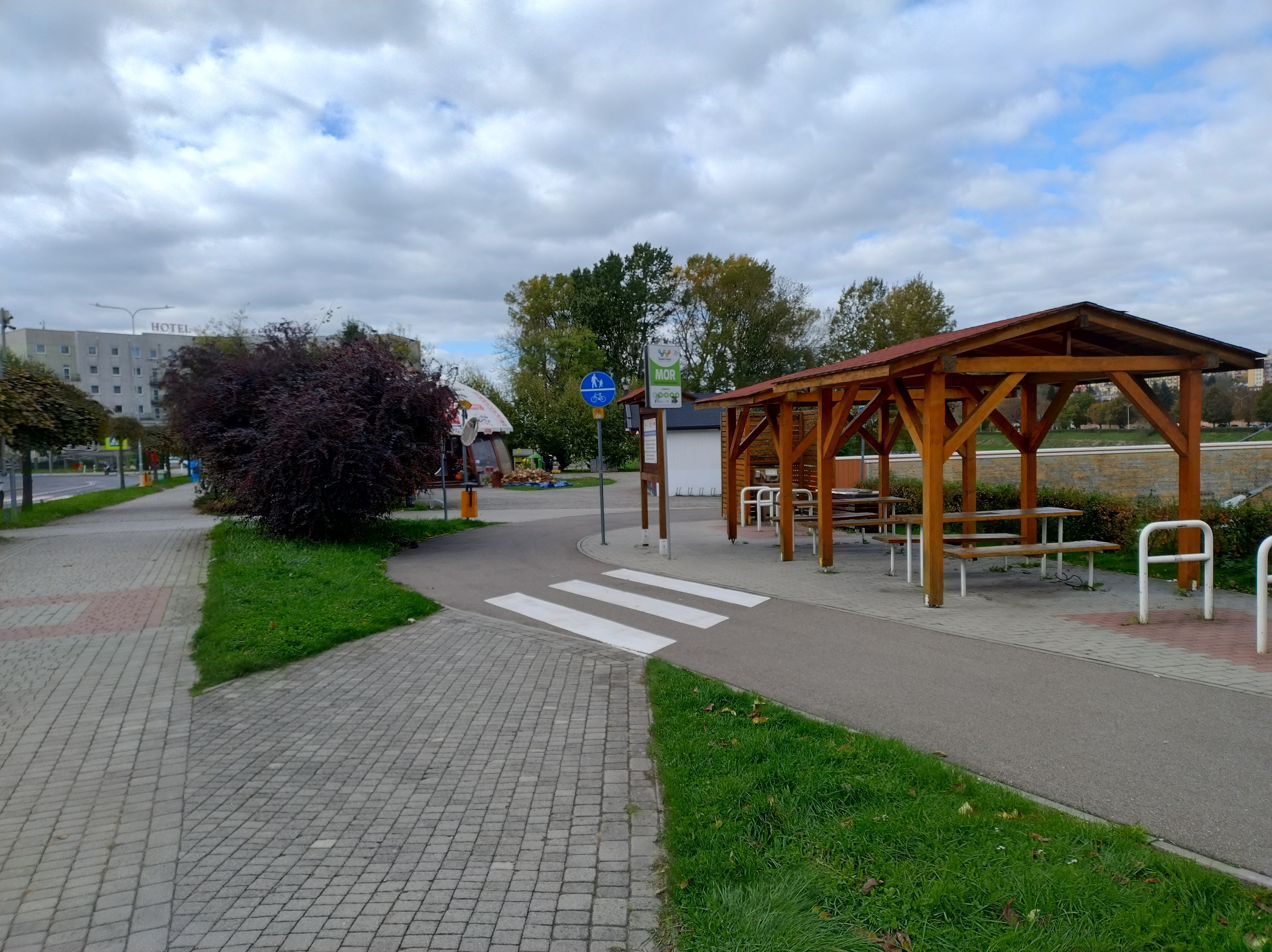
A Cyclist Service Area in Przemyśl

A total of 228 Miejsca Obsługi Rowerzystów (MOR; "Cyclist Service Areas") were built along the route. Facilities include shelters, benches, bicycle racks, information boards and waste bins; some were also equipped with portable toilets and water tanks.

=== Cyclist-Friendly Places ===
The route is supplemented by a system of Miejsca Przyjazne Rowerzystom (MPR; "Cyclist-Friendly Places"), including accommodation and catering establishments, tourist attractions, tourist information centres and other facilities providing services useful to cycle tourists. In 2018, the system included more than 900 registered Cyclist-Friendly Places.

=== Signage ===
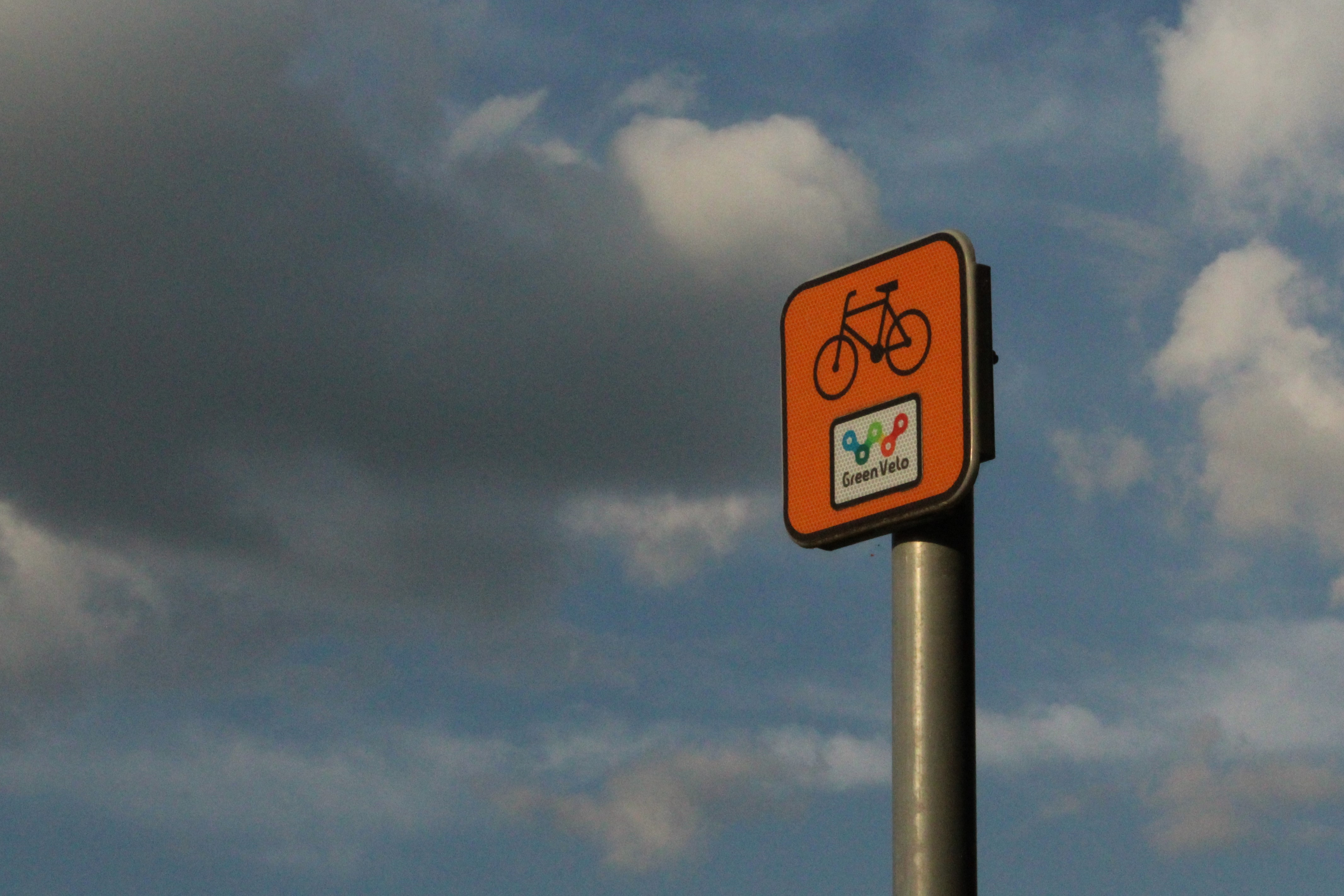
Green Velo signage in Korzenno

Green Velo uses distinctive orange route signs. The system is based on the Polish R-4 family of cycle-route signs. R-4 confirms the course of the route, R-4b indicates a change of direction, while R-4c and R-4d may provide directions and distances to towns and other destinations.

Branch and connecting routes provide access from the main route to transport hubs and major tourist attractions near Green Velo.

== Operation and maintenance ==
After completion of the project, responsibility for maintaining individual sections remained divided among the five voivodeships, road authorities and local-government units. By 2018, the absence of a single organisation responsible for managing Green Velo as a whole was identified as one of the principal obstacles to its further development.

In 2021, the Supreme Audit Office published the results of an audit of Green Velo's maintenance and use. The audit covered 39 entities, including 23 local-government bodies responsible for a combined 416 km (258 mi) of the route and 35 Cyclist Service Areas.

The audit found that Green Velo remained passable, but identified shortcomings in the technical maintenance of some roads and bridges and in route signage. Signage was incomplete in two-thirds of the audited municipalities and counties, and in four of them the missing signs could make it difficult for cyclists to determine the correct direction.

Minor deficiencies in equipment or maintenance were identified at one-third of the audited Cyclist Service Areas. One in five of the 23 audited local authorities had failed to perform required warranty inspections or periodic inspections of some roads and bridges carrying the route.

One of the most serious cases identified by NIK concerned a pedestrian and cycle bridge across the San at Bachów, which was being used by cars despite its intended purpose. Technical inspections indicated a risk to users, and in 2020 the building-control authority prohibited use of the bridge until barriers preventing motor-vehicle access were installed and a structural assessment had been carried out.

Between 2016 and 2020, 288 incidents involving cyclists were recorded on Green Velo sections in the five voivodeships. Three people were killed and 59 injured.

NIK concluded that the fragmented responsibility for individual sections did not favour consistent maintenance and promotion of the route and recommended the appointment or establishment of a single body responsible for managing Green Velo as a whole.

=== Cycle tourism and project effects ===
During the project's sustainability period, a comprehensive survey of use of the entire route was carried out once. A traffic survey conducted between May and September 2018 estimated that Green Velo was used by approximately 415,500 people, of whom 99.5% were domestic tourists.

Residents of the Subcarpathian Voivodeship constituted the largest group of Polish users, at 22.4%. Among the foreign tourists included in the survey, 60.5% were citizens of Belarus, followed by Ukraine (15.9%), Germany (13.4%) and Russia (10.2%).

An evaluation conducted five years after completion of the Subcarpathian component found that the project's planned output and result indicators had been achieved. Site inspections assessed most of the examined route sections and associated cycling infrastructure as being in good condition, while also identifying local problems including surface quality, signage and routing along roads with heavier motor traffic.

Research concerning border areas has also identified Green Velo as a factor in the development of cycle tourism and increased tourist activity in settlements along the Polish–Belarusian–Ukrainian border region.

== Promotion and awards ==
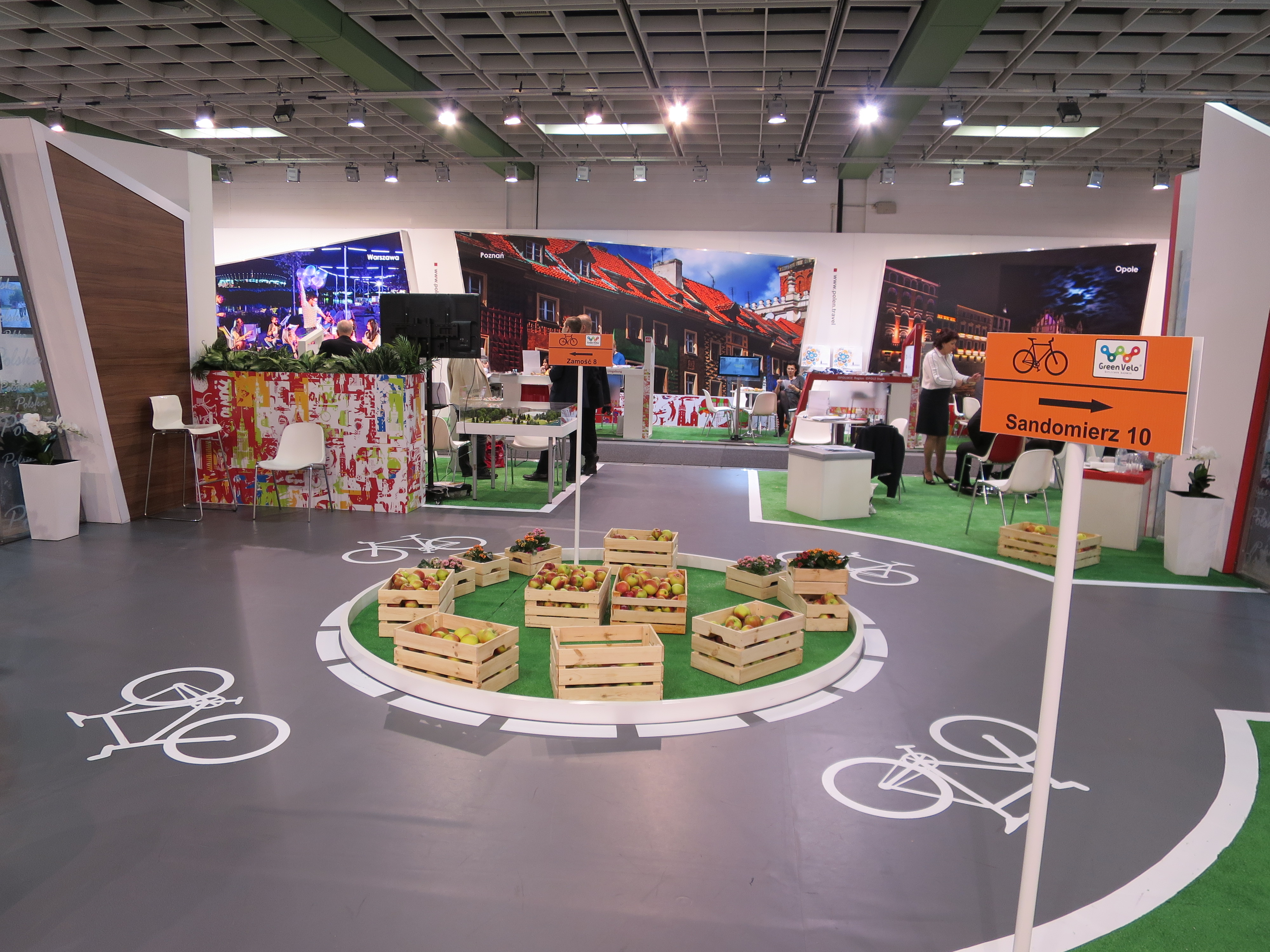
Green Velo stand at ITB Berlin in 2017

In 2014, Green Velo took second place in the journalists' and MT Polska Homo Turisticus competition for the most original and professional exhibition stand at the 12th TT Warsaw International Tourism Fair. In 2015, its stand received a distinction for the most interesting arrangement at the 20th LATO Tourism and Leisure Fair. The same year, the Green Velo stand won first prize for the most active stand at the GLOBalnie fair in Katowice.

A promotional film was also produced for Green Velo. The advertising spot received two awards at the FilmAT – Film, Art & Tourism Festival in Warsaw in 2015.

The Green Velo promotional campaign, with expenditure of approximately 25 million złoty, was awarded a Mercurius Gedanensis medal and diploma by the jury of the Tourism and Leisure Festival in Gdańsk.

== Gallery ==
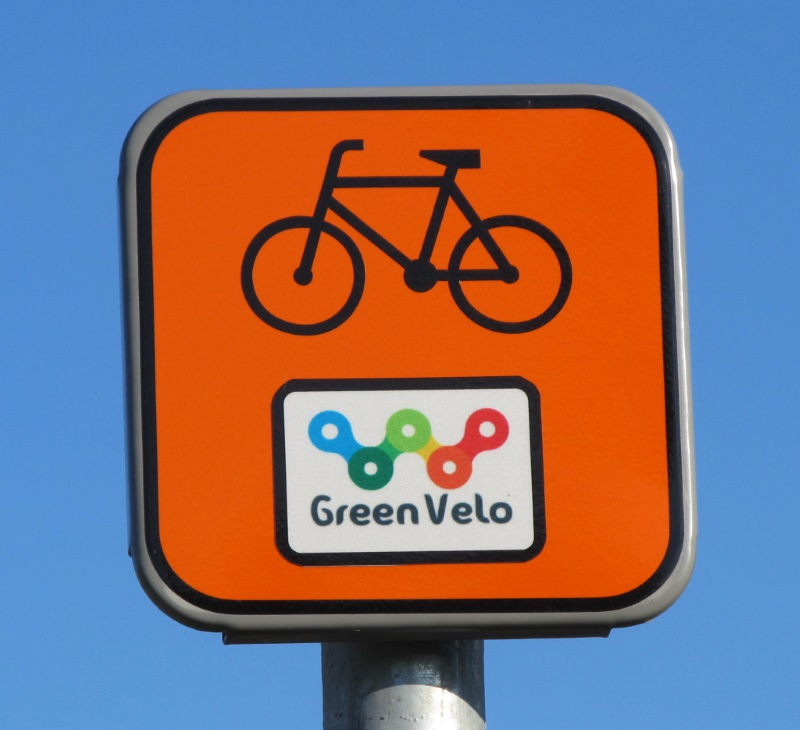
Green Velo road sign

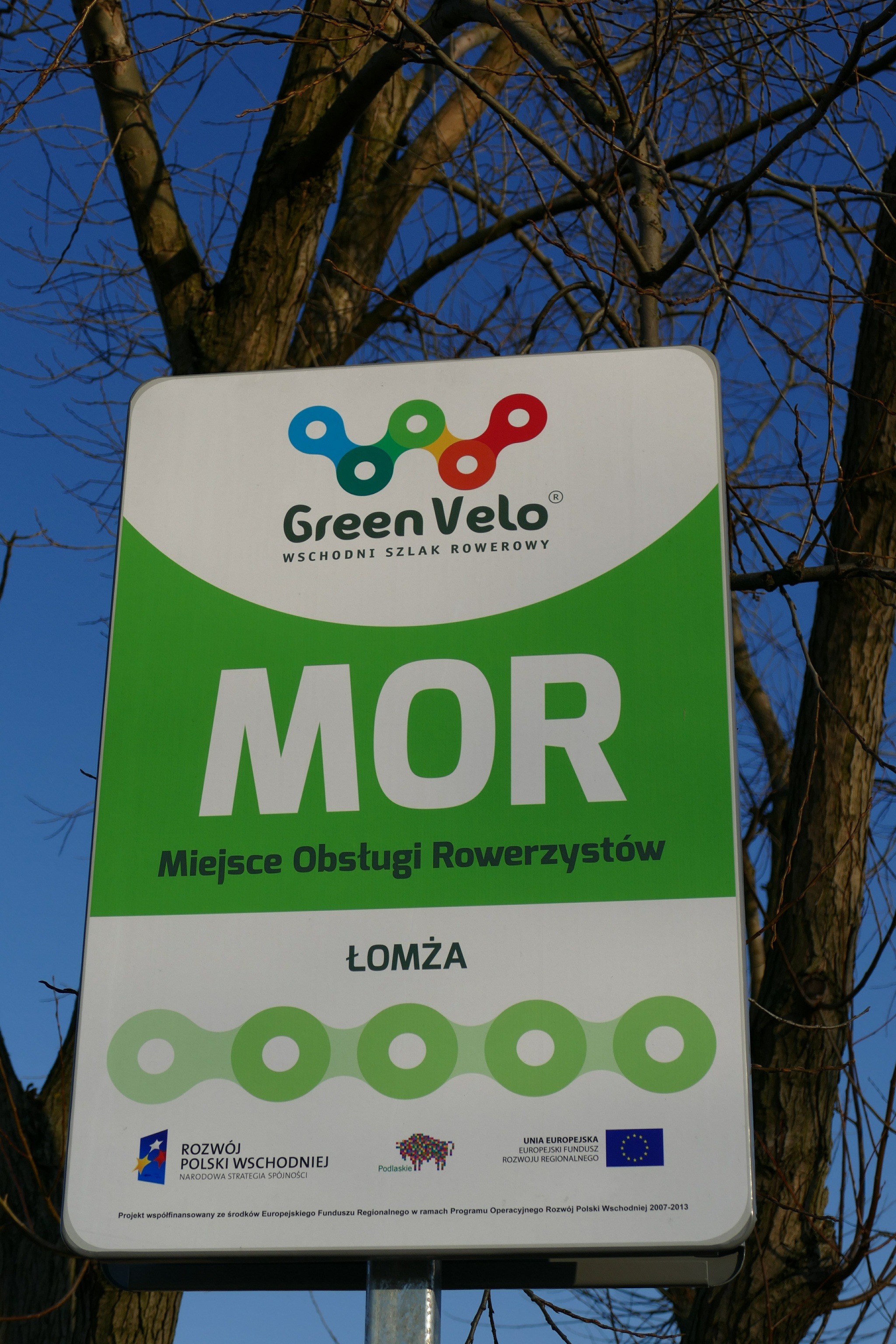
Signage at a Cyclist Service Area in Łomża

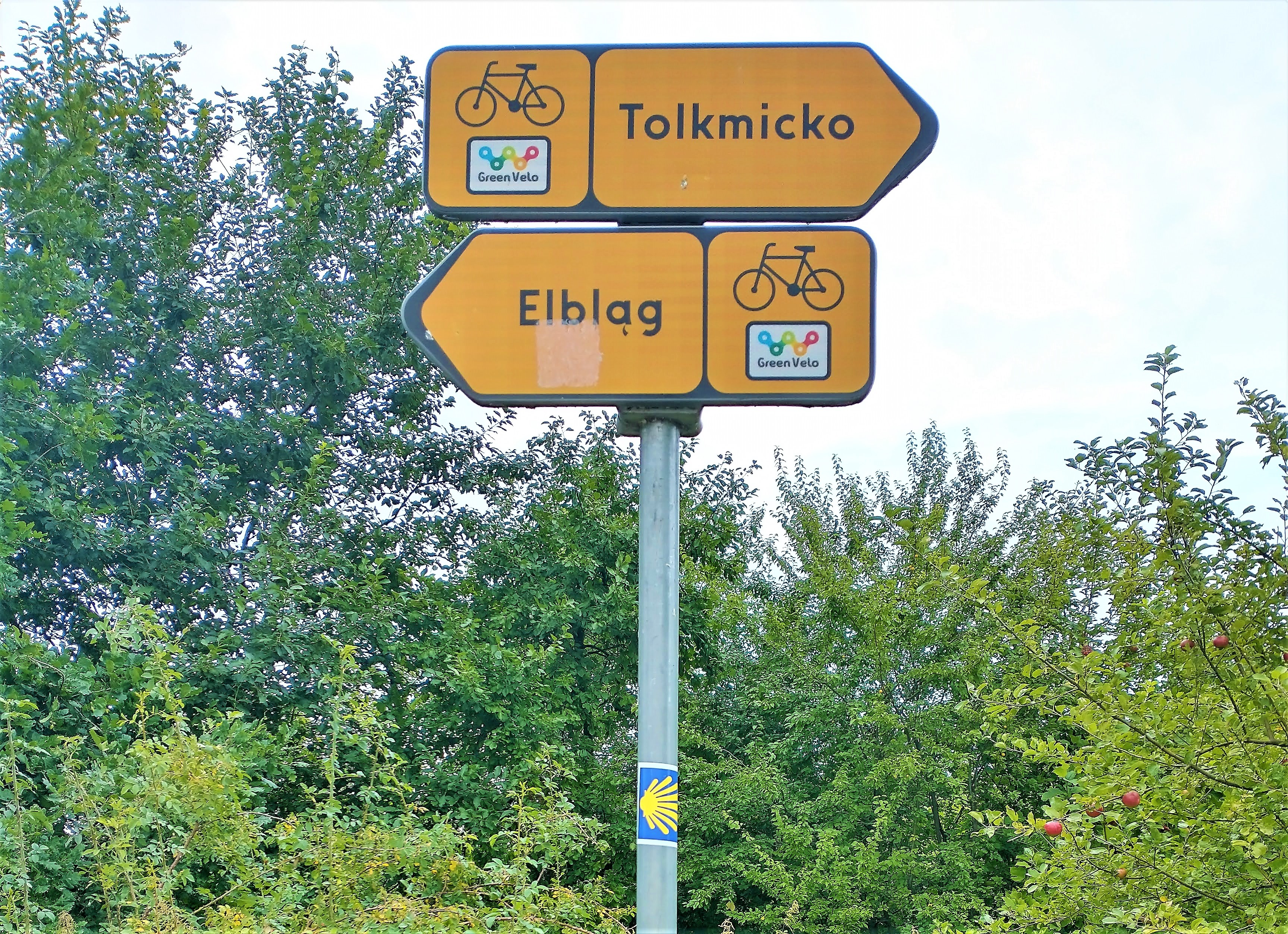
A section of Green Velo in Pęklewo

== See also ==
- EuroVelo
- Cycling in Poland
