= Kołczewko =

- Village part
- Location within Poland
- Coordinates: 53°56′43″N 14°36′49″E
- Country: Poland
- Voivodeship: West Pomeranian
- County: Kamień
- Gmina: Wolin
- Village: Kołczewo
- Time zone: UTC+1 (CET)
  - Summer (DST): UTC+2 (CEST)
- Postal code: 72-514
- Area code: +48 91

Kołczewko (Polish: [kɔwˈt͡ʂɛf.kɔ]) is a part of the village of Kołczewo, located in the West Pomeranian Voivodeship, Poland, within the Gmina Wolin, Kamień County.

== History ==
Kołczewko was an independent settlement until 2007, when it was incorporated into the nearby village of Kołczewo.
