= Międzywodzie =

- Village
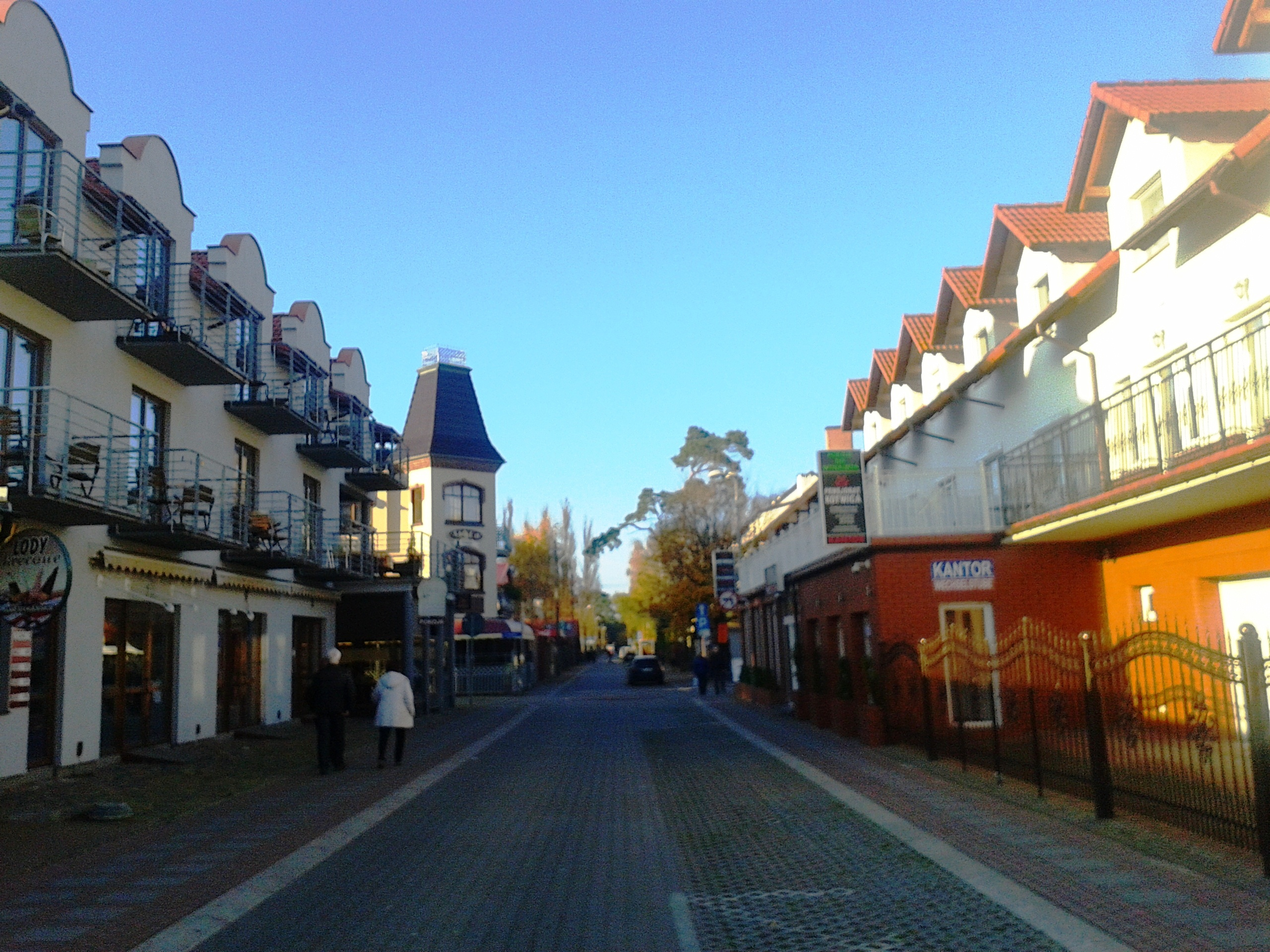

- Location within Poland
- Coordinates: 54°0′20″N 14°41′49″E
- Country: Poland
- Voivodeship: West Pomeranian
- County: Kamień
- Gmina: Dziwnów
- Elevation: 0–10 m (0–33 ft)
- Population (2014): 681
- Time zone: UTC+1 (CET)
  - Summer (DST): UTC+2 (CEST)
- Area code: +48 91
- Vehicle registration: ZKA

Międzywodzie [mjɛnd͡zɨˈvɔd͡ʑɛ] (German: Heidebrink) is a village in the administrative district of Gmina Dziwnów, within Kamień County, West Pomeranian Voivodeship, in north-western Poland. It lies approximately 4 km (2 mi) west of Dziwnów, 8 km (5 mi) north-west of Kamień Pomorski, and 66 km (41 mi) north of the regional capital Szczecin.

For the history of the region, see History of Pomerania.

The village has a population of 681 (2014).

== Gallery ==
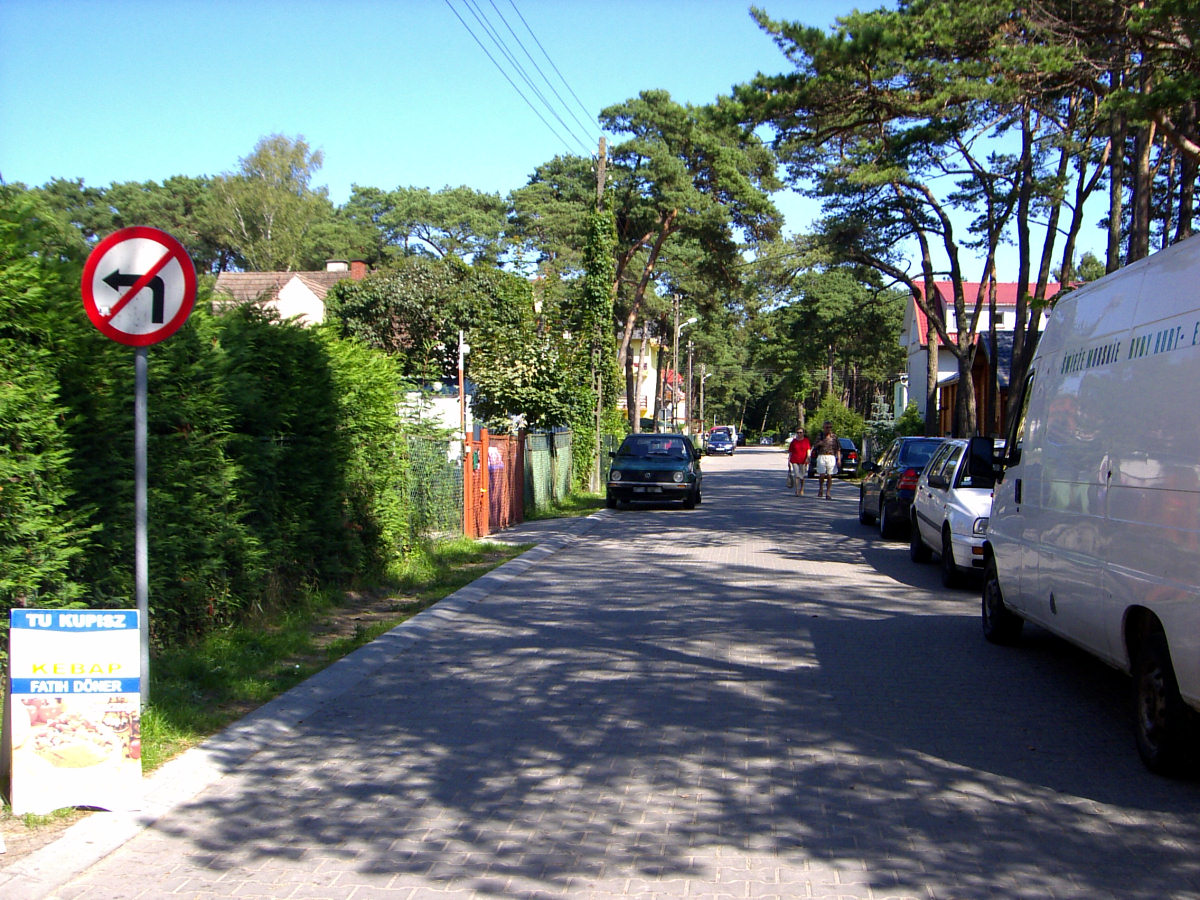
Rybacka street

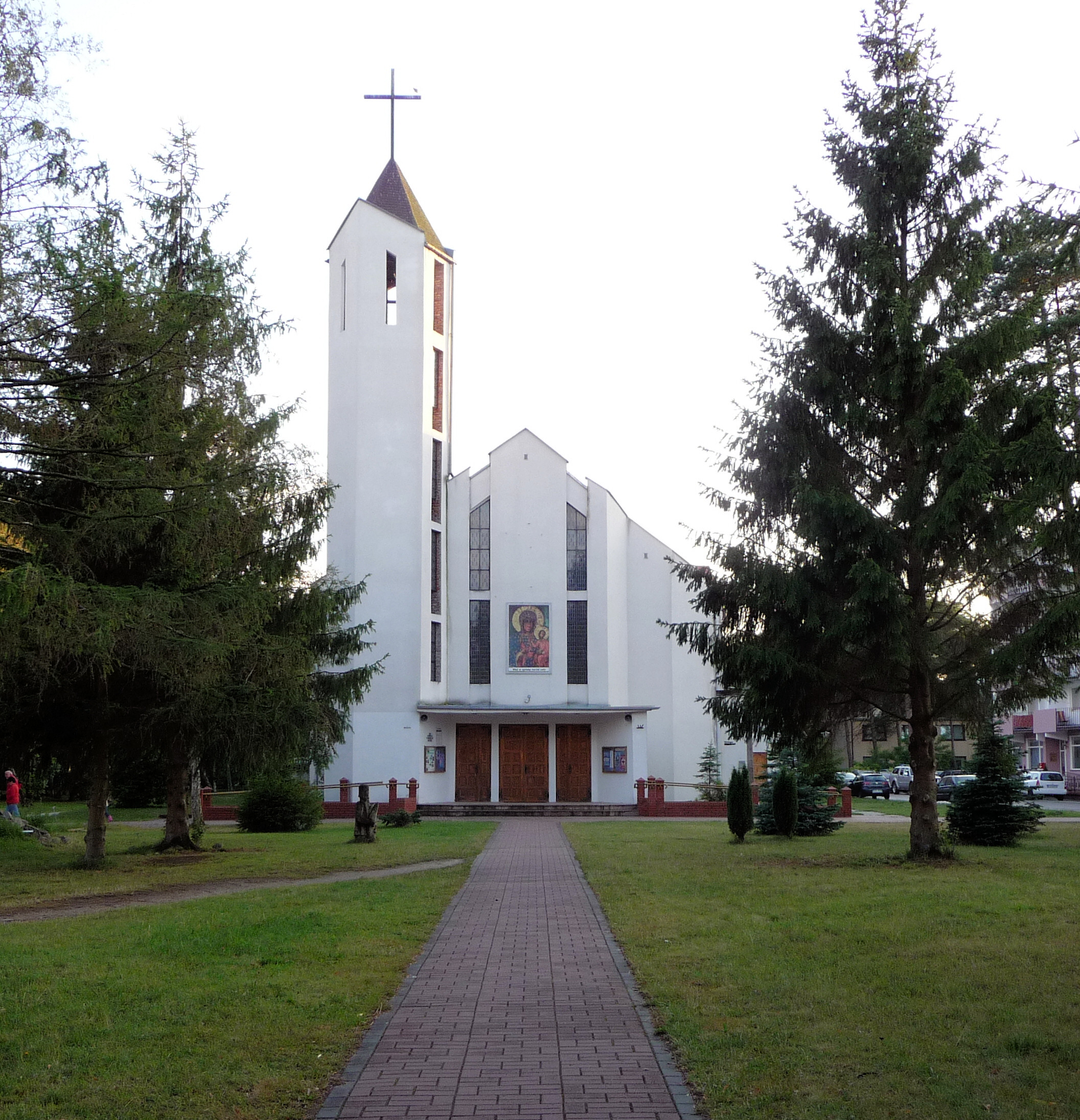
Catholic Church of the Assumption

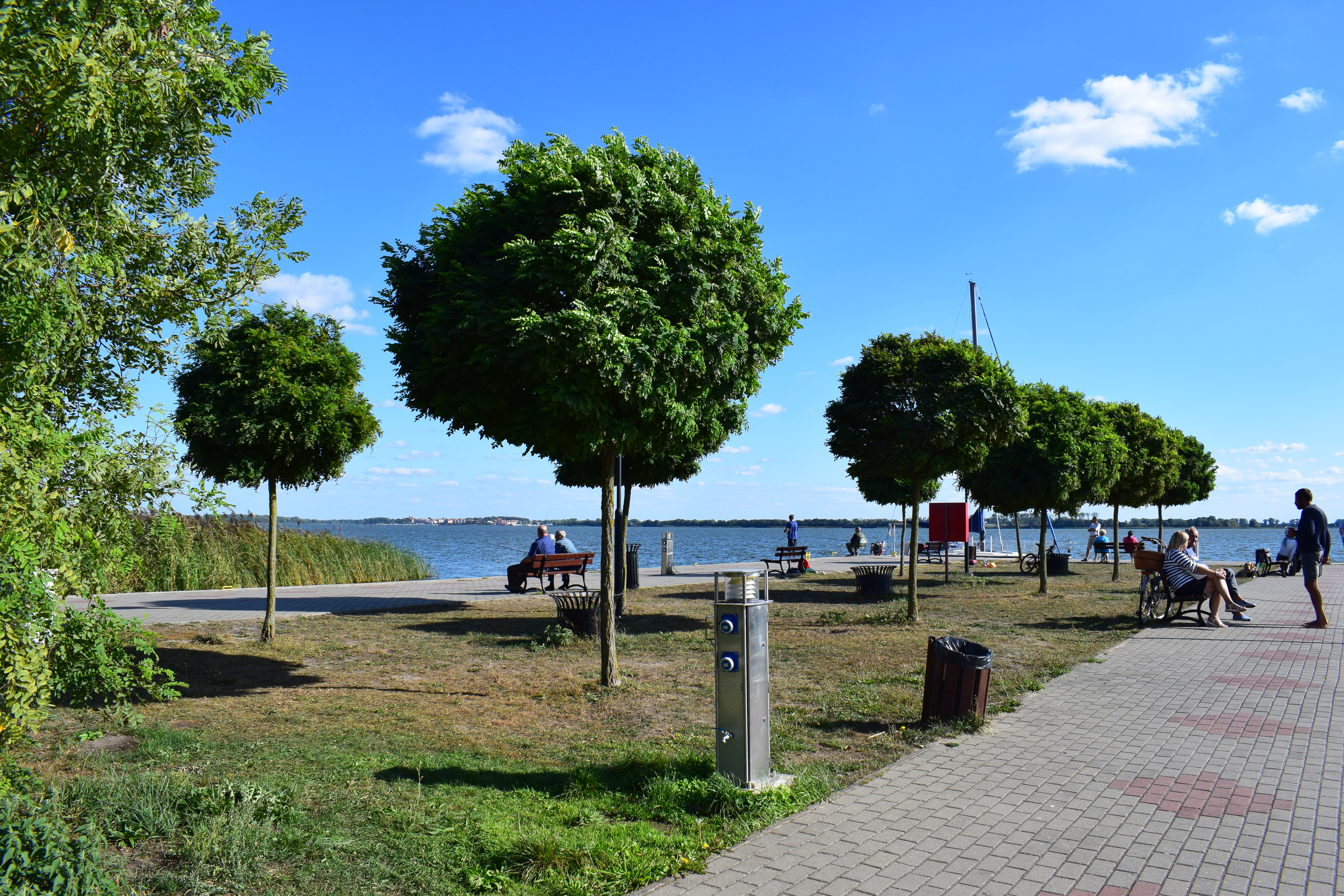
Pier in Międzywodzie

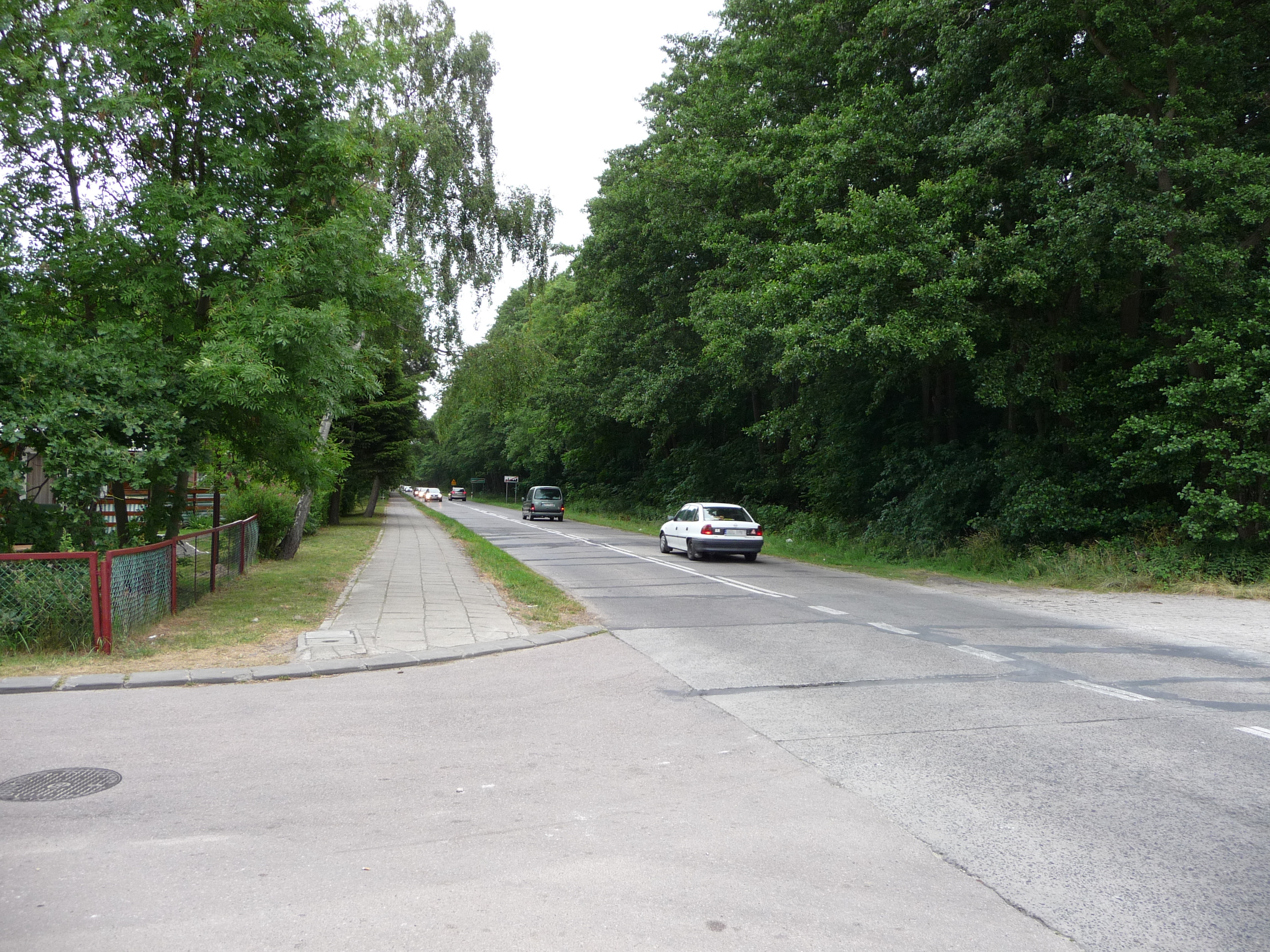
Part of Voivodeship Road no. 102. Crossing with Westerplatte street.
