= Gmina Dziwnów =

Gmina Dziwnów Dziwnów Commune
- Gmina
- Flag Coat of arms
- Interactive map of Gmina Dziwnów
- Coordinates (Dziwnów): 54°1′N 14°45′E
- Country: Poland
- Voivodeship: West Pomeranian
- County: Kamień
- Seat: Dziwnów

Area
  - Total: 37.91 km^{2} (14.64 sq mi)

Population (2006)
  - Total: 4,148
  - Density: 109.4/km^{2} (283.4/sq mi)
  - Urban: 2,949
  - Rural: 1,199
- Website: http://www.dziwnow.pl/

Gmina Dziwnów is an urban-rural gmina (administrative district) in Kamień County, West Pomeranian Voivodeship, in north-western Poland. Its seat is the town of Dziwnów, which lies approximately 6 kilometres (4 mi) north-west of Kamień Pomorski and 68 km (42 mi) north of the regional capital Szczecin.

The gmina covers an area of 37.91 square kilometres (14.6 sq mi), and as of 2006 its total population is 4,148 (out of which the population of Dziwnów amounts to 2,949, and the population of the rural part of the gmina is 1,199).

== Villages ==
Apart from the town of Dziwnów, the gmina also contains the villages of Dziwnówek, Łukęcin and Międzywodzie.

== Neighbouring gminas ==
Gmina Dziwnów is bordered by the gminas of Kamień Pomorski, Rewal, Świerzno and Wolin.
