= Georg Heinrich Ferdinand Nesselmann =

German orientalist, philologist and mathematics historian

Georg Heinrich Ferdinand Nesselmann (February 14, 1811 in Fürstenau, near Tiegenhof, West Prussia (now Kmiecin, within Nowy Dwór Gdański) – January 7, 1881 in Königsberg) was a German orientalist, a philologist with interests in Baltic languages, and a mathematics historian.

At the University of Königsberg he studied mathematics under Carl Gustav Jacob Jacobi and Friedrich Julius Richelot, and oriental philology under Peter von Bohlen. In 1837 he received his PhD at Königsberg, where in 1859 he became a full professor of Arabic and Sanskrit.

In his book "Die Sprache der alten Preußen" (The language of the Old Prussians, 1845), he suggested the term "Baltic languages".

== Works ==
- Versuch einer kritischen Geschichte der Algebra, G. Reimer, Berlin 1842
- Wörterbuch der littauischen Sprache, Gebrüder Bornträger, Königsberg 1851
- Littauische Volkslieder, gesammelt, kritisch bearbeitet und metrisch übersetzt, Dümmler, Berlin 1853
- Thesaurus linguae prussicae, 1873, Reprint 1969
- Die Sprache der alten Preußen an ihren Überresten erläutert, 1845 Berlin: Reimer
- Ein deutsch-preußisches Vocabularium aus dem Anfange des 15. Jahrhunderts. In: Altpreußische Monatsschrift Bd. 4, Heft 5, Königsberg 1868
