= Łukęcin =

- Village
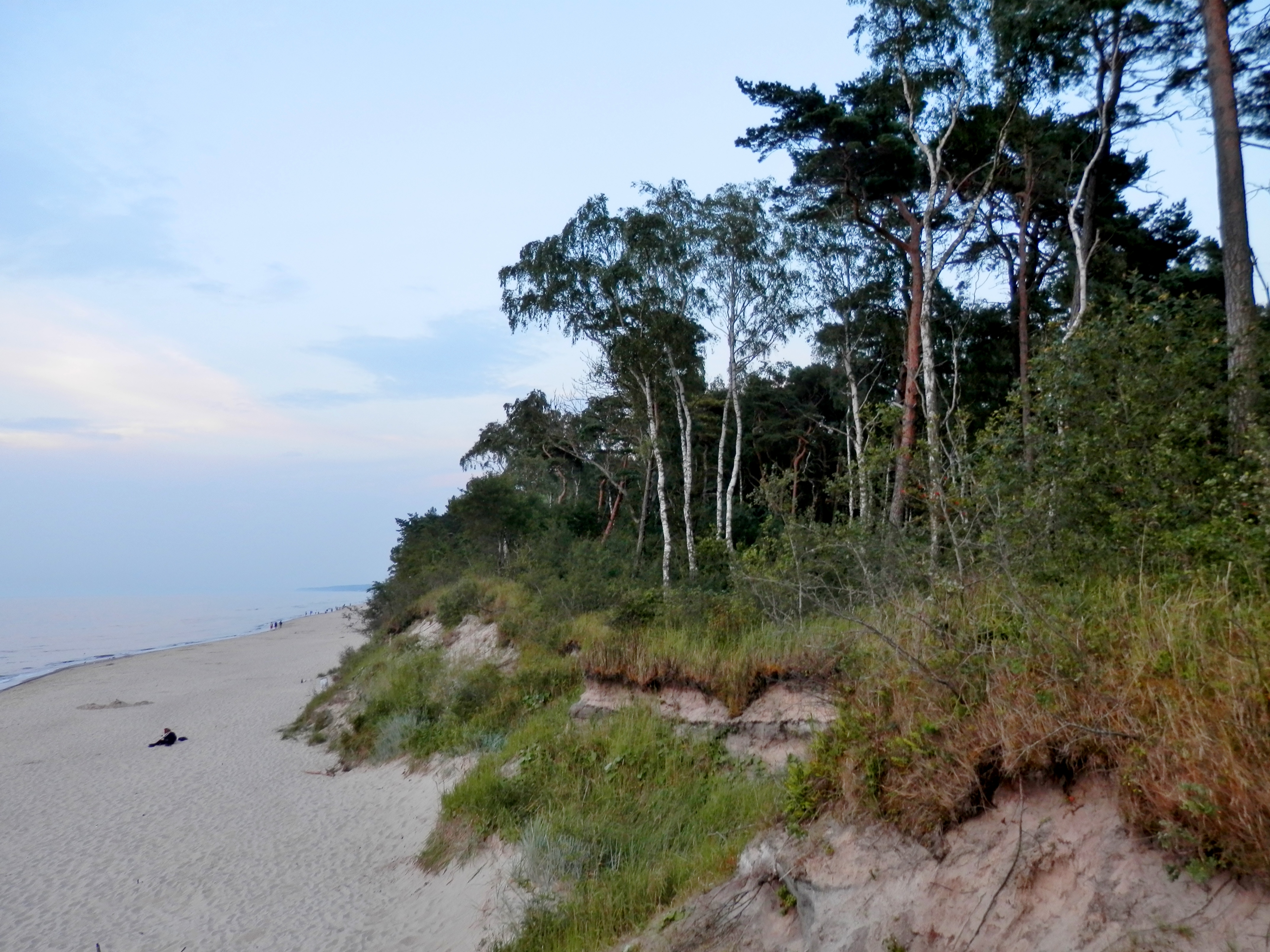
- Beach in Łukęcin

- Location within Poland
- Coordinates: 54°2′N 14°53′E
- Country: Poland
- Voivodeship: West Pomeranian
- County: Kamień
- Gmina: Dziwnów
- Population: 130
- Time zone: UTC+1 (CET)
  - Summer (DST): UTC+2 (CEST)
- Area code: +48 91
- Vehicle registration: ZKA

Łukęcin [wuˈkɛnt͡ɕin] (German: Lüchenthin) is a village in the administrative district of Gmina Dziwnów, within Kamień County, West Pomeranian Voivodeship, in north-western Poland. It lies approximately 9 km (6 mi) east of Dziwnów, 10 km (6 mi) north-east of Kamień Pomorski, and 72 km (45 mi) north of the regional capital Szczecin.

For the history of the region, see History of Pomerania.

The village has a population of 130.
