= Kmiecin =

- Village
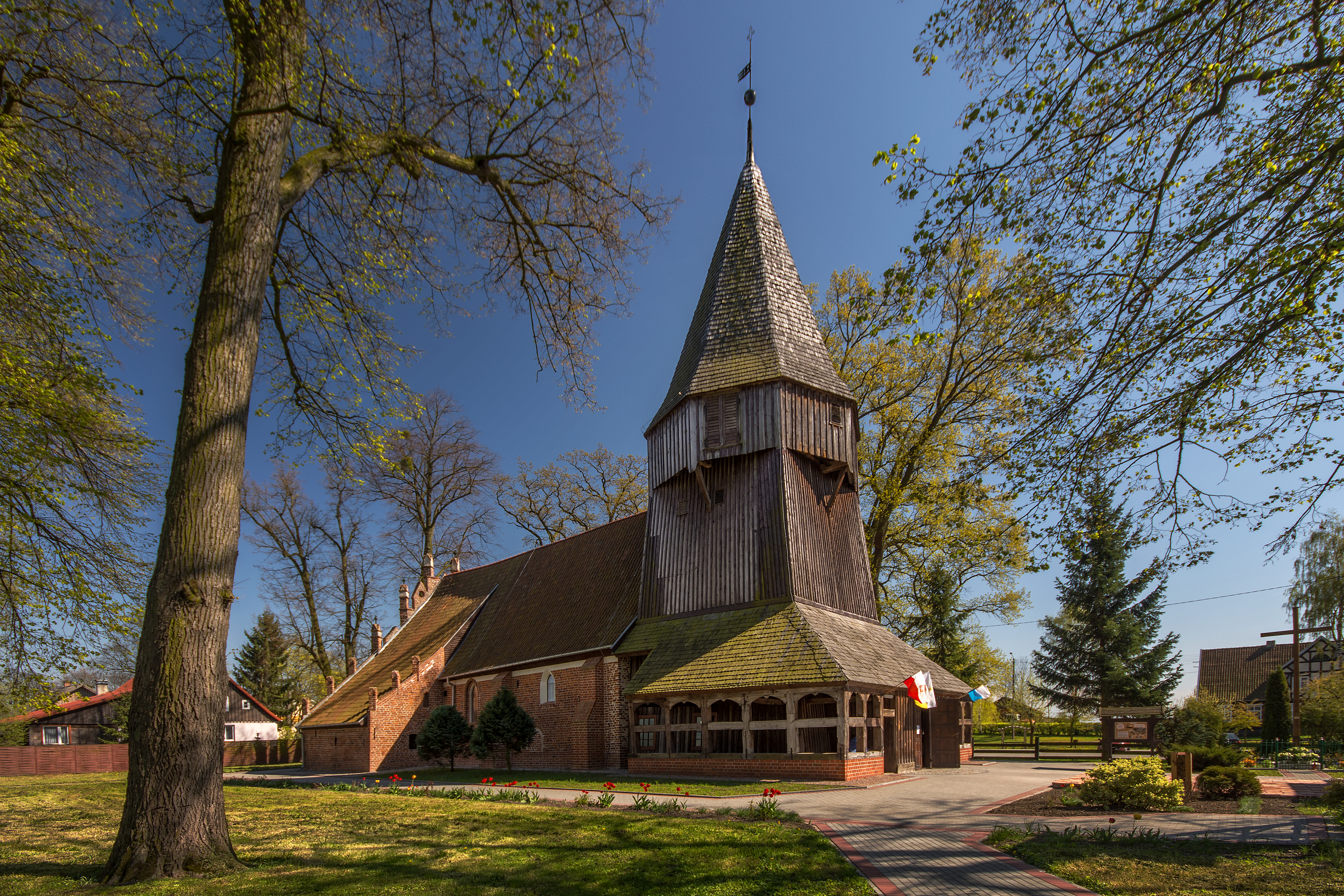
- Church of Saint Hedwig Queen of Poland

- Location within Poland
- Coordinates: 54°11′18″N 19°8′36″E
- Country: Poland
- Voivodeship: Pomeranian
- County: Nowy Dwór
- Gmina: Nowy Dwór Gdański

Population
  - Total: 970

Kmiecin ([ˈkmjɛt͡ɕin]; German: Fürstenau) is a village in the administrative district of Gmina Nowy Dwór Gdański, within Nowy Dwór County, Pomeranian Voivodeship, in northern Poland.

== Notable people ==
- Georg Heinrich Ferdinand Nesselmann (1811 in Fürstenau – 1881) a German orientalist, a philologist with interests in Baltic languages, and a mathematics historian
