= Sielpia Wielka =

- Village
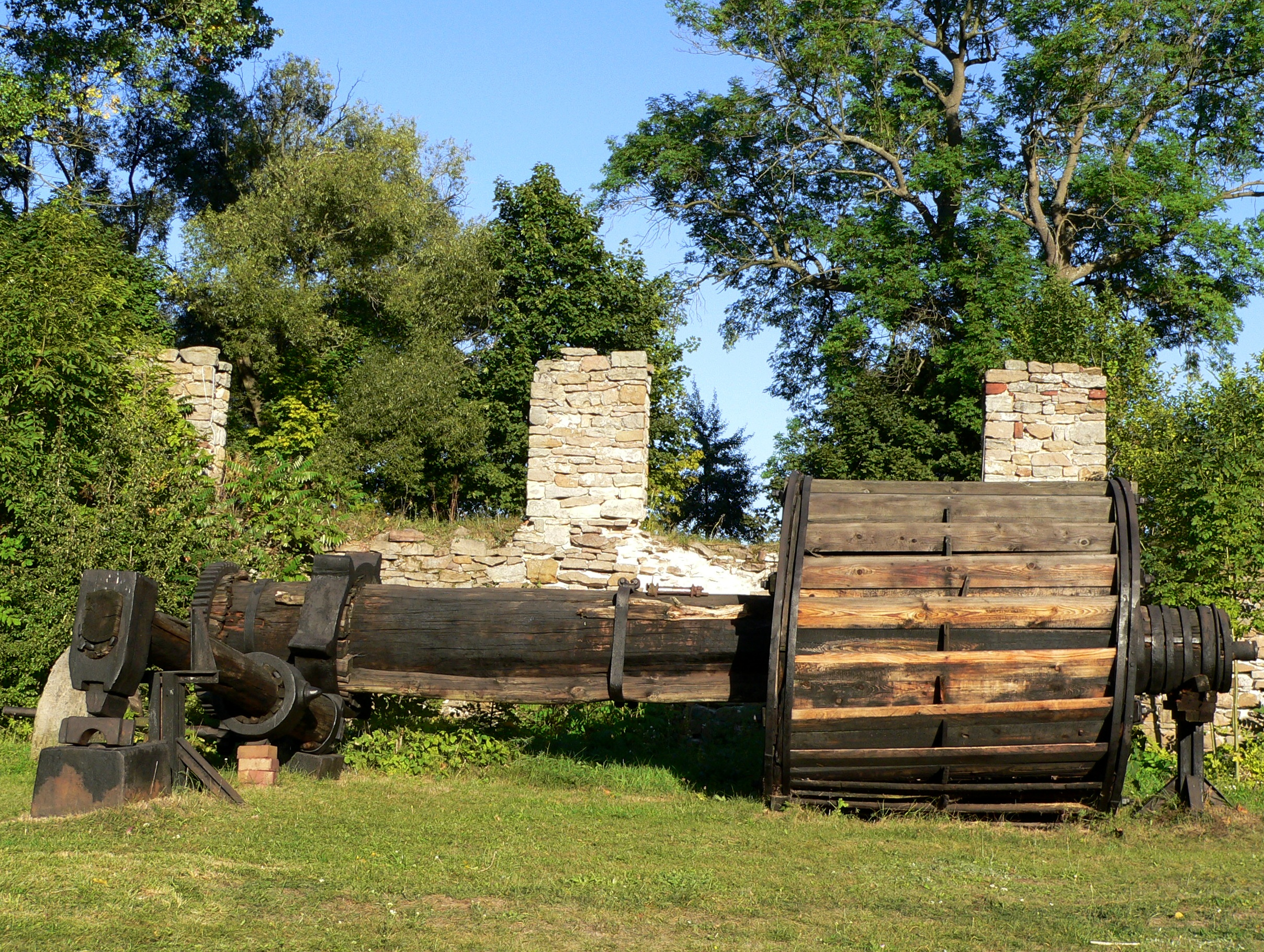

- Location within Poland
- Coordinates: 51°6′50″N 20°20′37″E
- Country: Poland
- Voivodeship: Świętokrzyskie
- County: Końskie
- Gmina: Końskie
- Population: 220

Sielpia Wielka [ˈɕɛlpja ˈvjɛlka] is a village in the administrative district of Gmina Końskie, within Końskie County, Świętokrzyskie Voivodeship, in south-central Poland. It lies approximately 11 km (7 mi) south-west of Końskie and 32 km (20 mi) north-west of the regional capital Kielce.
