= Poddąbie =

- Village
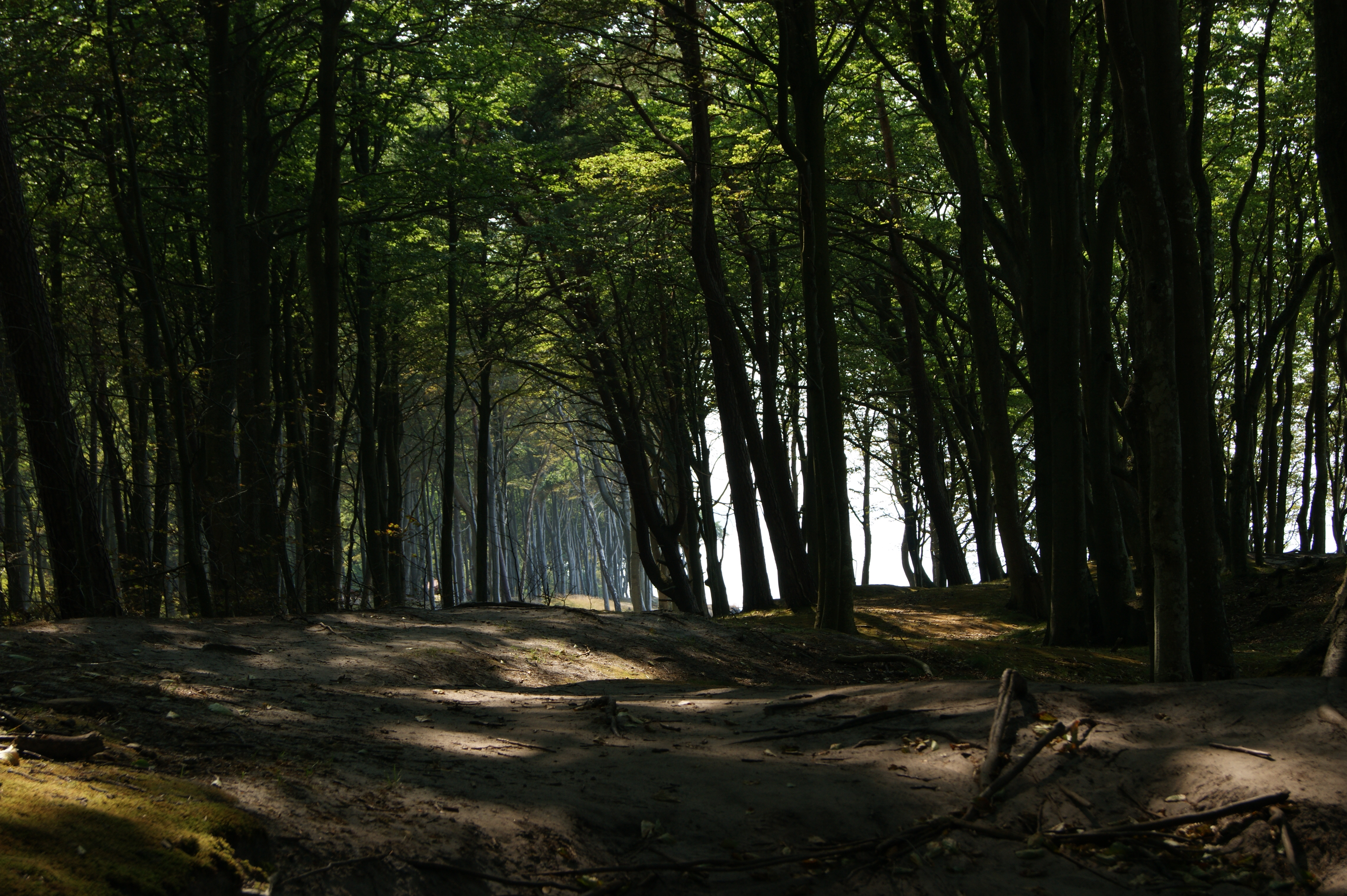
- Forest in Poddąbie

- Location within Poland
- Coordinates: 54°37′21″N 16°59′14″E
- Country: Poland
- Voivodeship: Pomeranian
- County: Słupsk
- Gmina: Ustka
- Population: 39
- Time zone: UTC+1 (CET)
  - Summer (DST): UTC+2 (CEST)
- Vehicle registration: GSL

Poddąbie [pɔdˈdɔmbjɛ] is a village in the administrative district of Gmina Ustka within Słupsk County, Pomeranian Voivodeship, in northwestern Poland. It is located on the Slovincian Coast in the historic region of Pomerania.
