= Kołczewo =

- Village
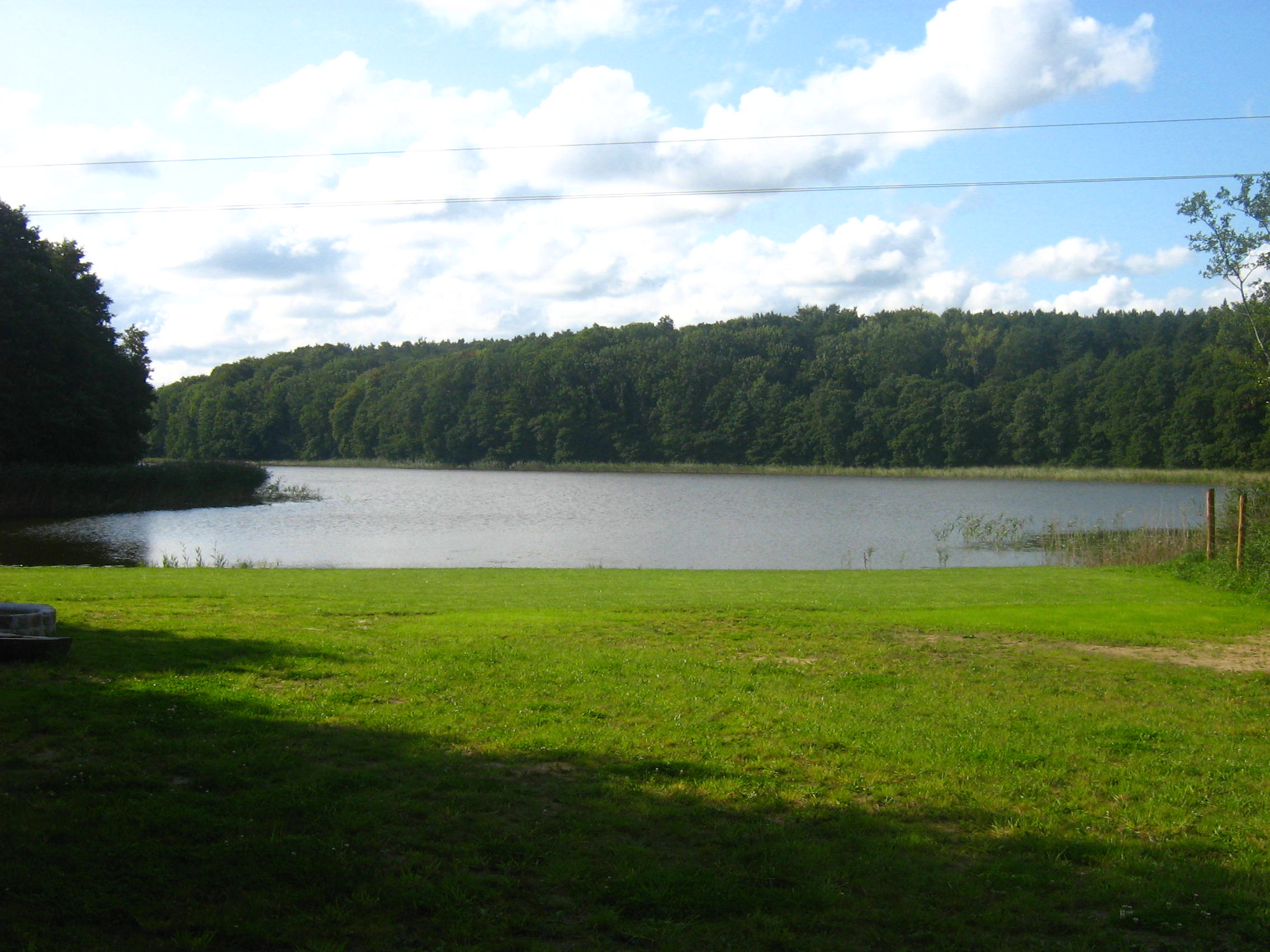
- Kołczewo Lake

- Location within Poland
- Coordinates: 53°57′N 14°36′E
- Country: Poland
- Voivodeship: West Pomeranian
- County: Kamień
- Gmina: Wolin
- Population: 770

Kołczewo [kɔu̯ˈt͡ʂɛvɔ] (German Kolzow) is a village in the administrative district of Gmina Wolin, within Kamień County, West Pomeranian Voivodeship, in north-western Poland. It lies approximately 13 km (8 mi) north of Wolin, 13 km (8 mi) west of Kamień Pomorski, and 60 km (37 mi) north of the regional capital Szczecin.
