= Dziwnów =

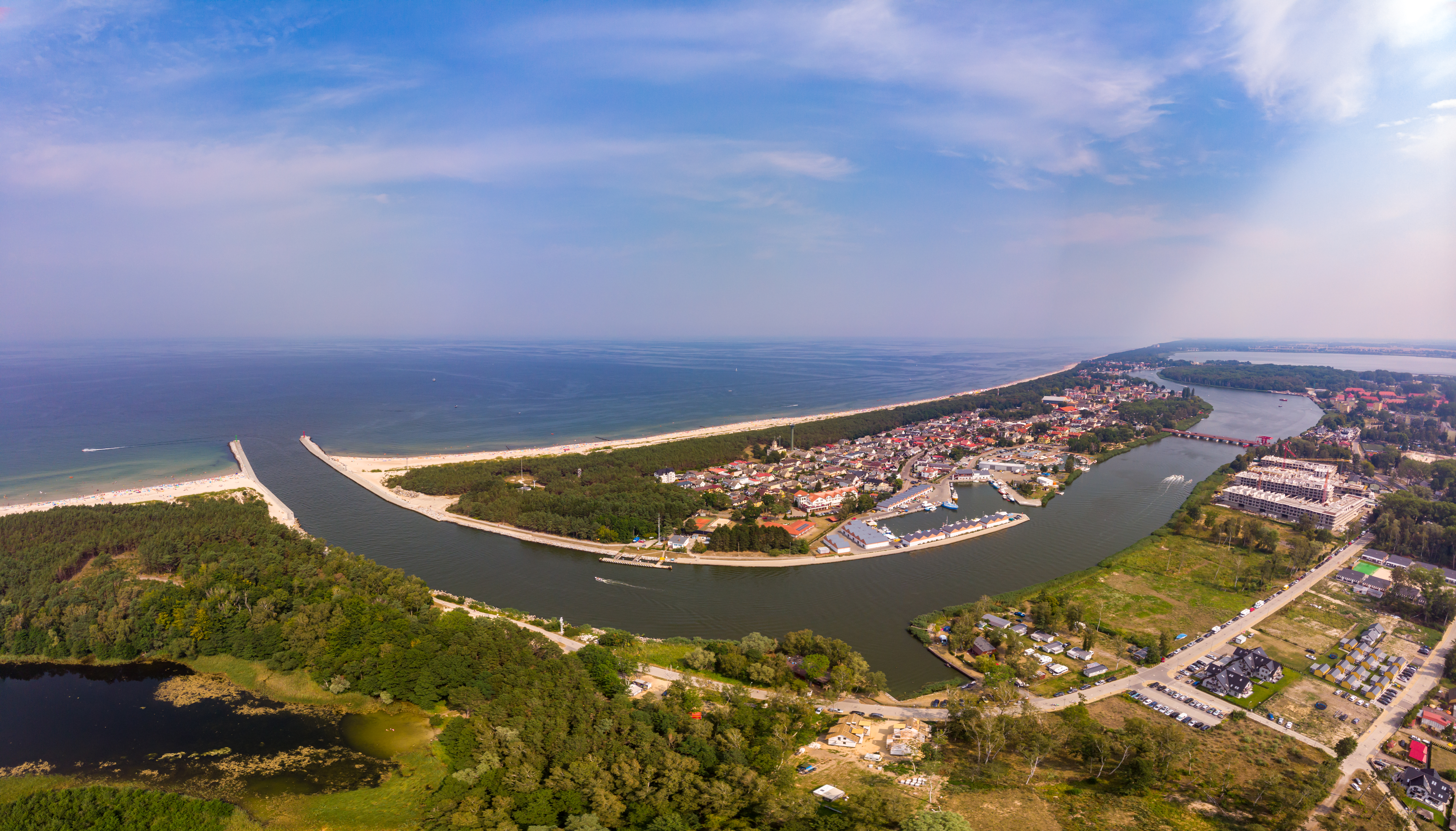
- Aerial view of Dziwnów along the Baltic Sea

- Flag Coat of arms

- Location within Poland
- Coordinates: 54°1′N 14°45′E
- Country: Poland
- Voivodeship: West Pomeranian
- County: Kamień
- Gmina: Dziwnów
- First mentioned: 1243
- Town rights: 2004

Government
  - Mayor: Łukasz Dzioch

Area
  - Total: 4.93 km^{2} (1.90 sq mi)

Population (31 December 2021)
  - Total: 2,595
  - Density: 526/km^{2} (1,360/sq mi)
- Time zone: UTC+1 (CET)
  - Summer (DST): UTC+2 (CEST)
- Postal code: 72-420
- Area code: +48 91
- Car plates: ZKA
- Website: https://www.dziwnow.pl

Dziwnów [ˈd͡ʑivnuf] (German: Dievenow) is a town in north-western Poland situated on the Baltic Sea at the mouth of the river Dziwna which divides it into the right-bank part containing the center of the town, belonging to historical Farther Pomerania, while the left-bank part is located in Western Pomerania, with both parts connected through a bascule bridge. It is the seat of Dziwnów municipality within Kamień County, West Pomeranian Voivodeship. As of December 2021, the town has a population of 2,595.

== History ==
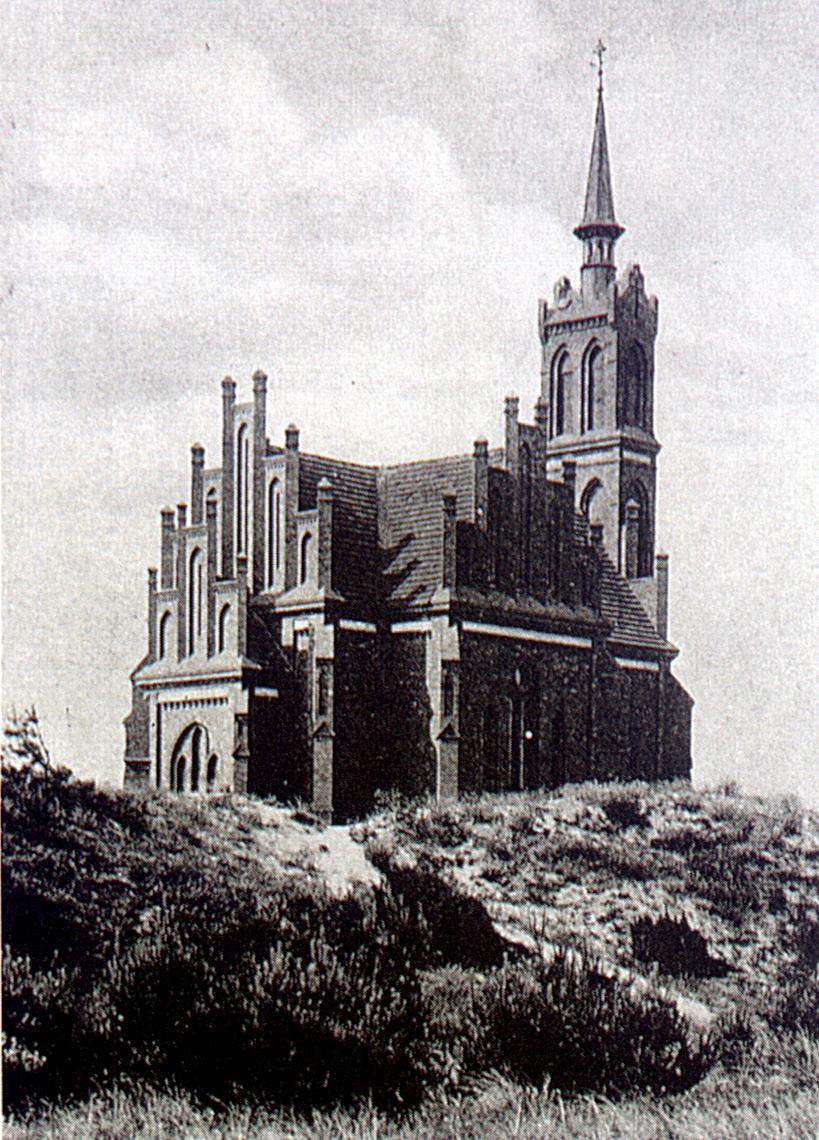
Old church before being destroyed during World War II

The territory became part of the emerging Polish state under its first ruler Mieszko I around 967 and the battle at Julin Bridge took place nearby in 1170. The first mentioning of the village in chronicles dates back to 1243. It remained a small fishing village.

The area gained importance in the early 17th century, when Swedish troops built an earthen fort at the mouth of the Dziwna River. After the Swedish withdrawal, the fort gradually fell into decay, with no trace remaining. Due to its seaside location the village slowly transformed from a fishing village into a holiday resort. At the end of the 19th century, salt springs were discovered, and the first sanatorium was established. As a result the town became a popular spa town in the German Empire. In the 1930s, military barracks were built. During World War II, in June 1944, American army conducted air raids on the German garrison in the village. The historic church was destroyed in the final stages of the war. Polish troops entered in May 1945. In accordance with the Potsdam Agreement the city became part of the Polish People's Republic.

In 1949 and 1950 in the local garrison there was a military hospital for Greeks and Macedonians wounded in the Greek Civil War. In total, around 2,000 people were treated there. Later on, in the 1950s, the hospital staff co-created the Military Medical Academy in Łódź. In 1958 Dziwnów was granted urban-type settlement status and afterwards a port was built. The development of the settlement in the following decades led to the granting of municipal rights in 2004. From 1964 to 1986, the 1st Assault Battalion, which was considered one of the best trained units in the history of the Polish Army, was stationed in Dziwnów.

In 2004, Dziwnów received town privileges

== International relations ==
Dziwnów is twinned with:

- Gorzów Wielkopolski, Poland (2014)
- Sosnowiec, Poland (2013)
- Werneuchen, Germany (1993)

== Gallery ==
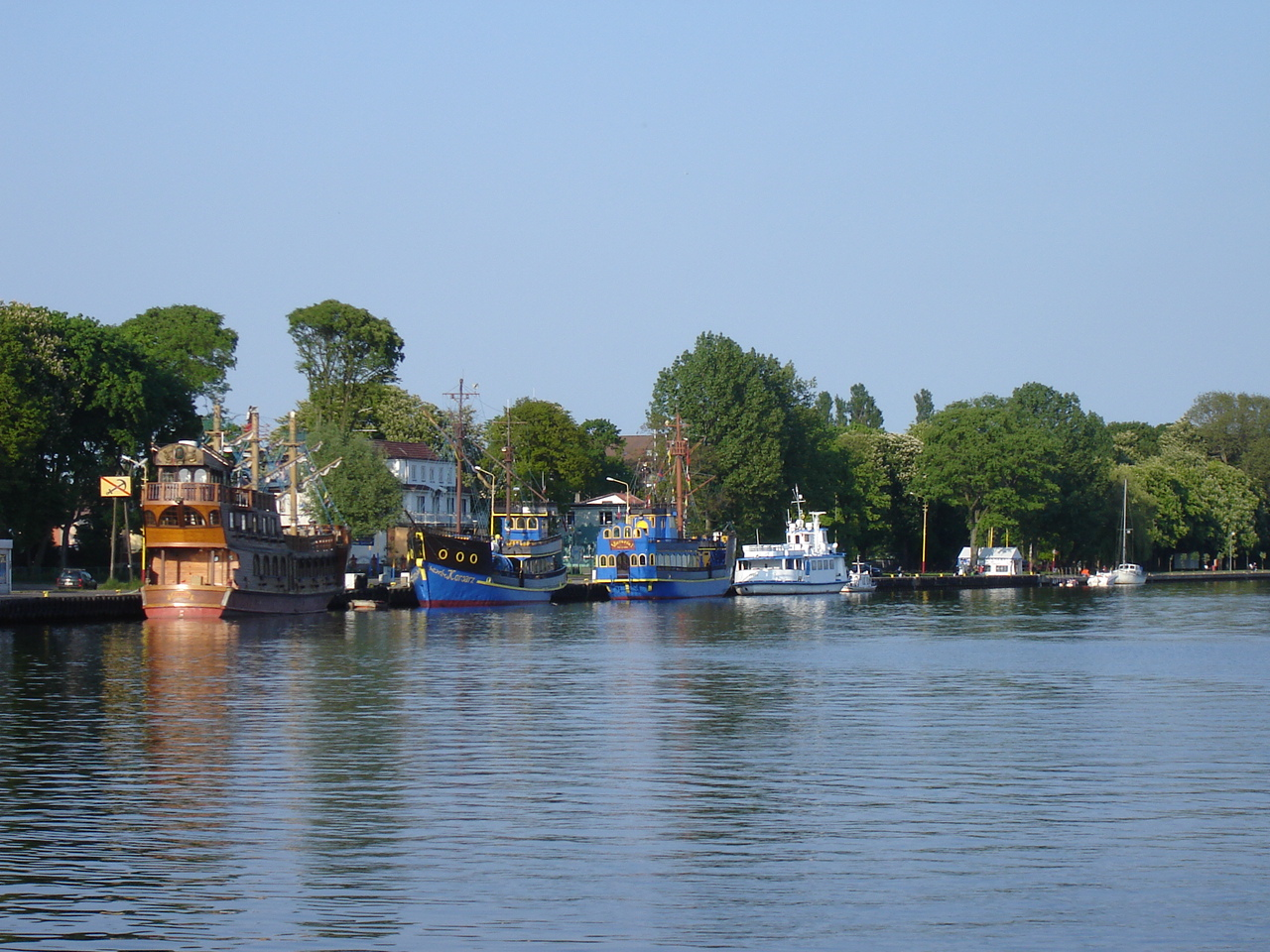
Fishing Port

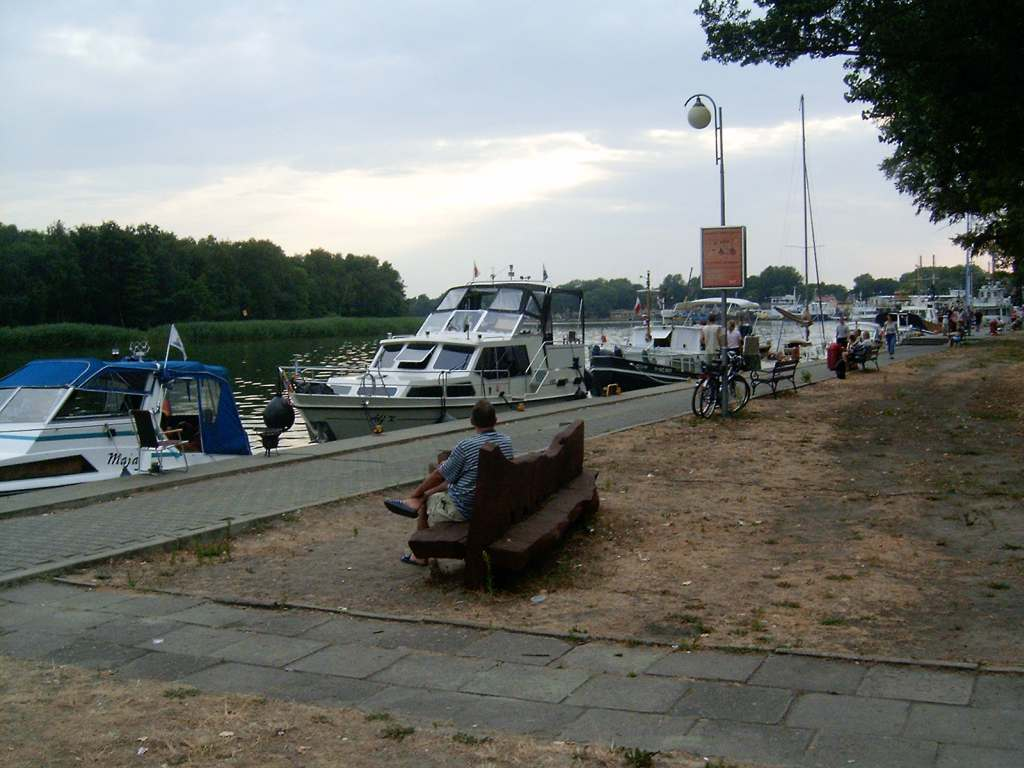
Yacht Quay

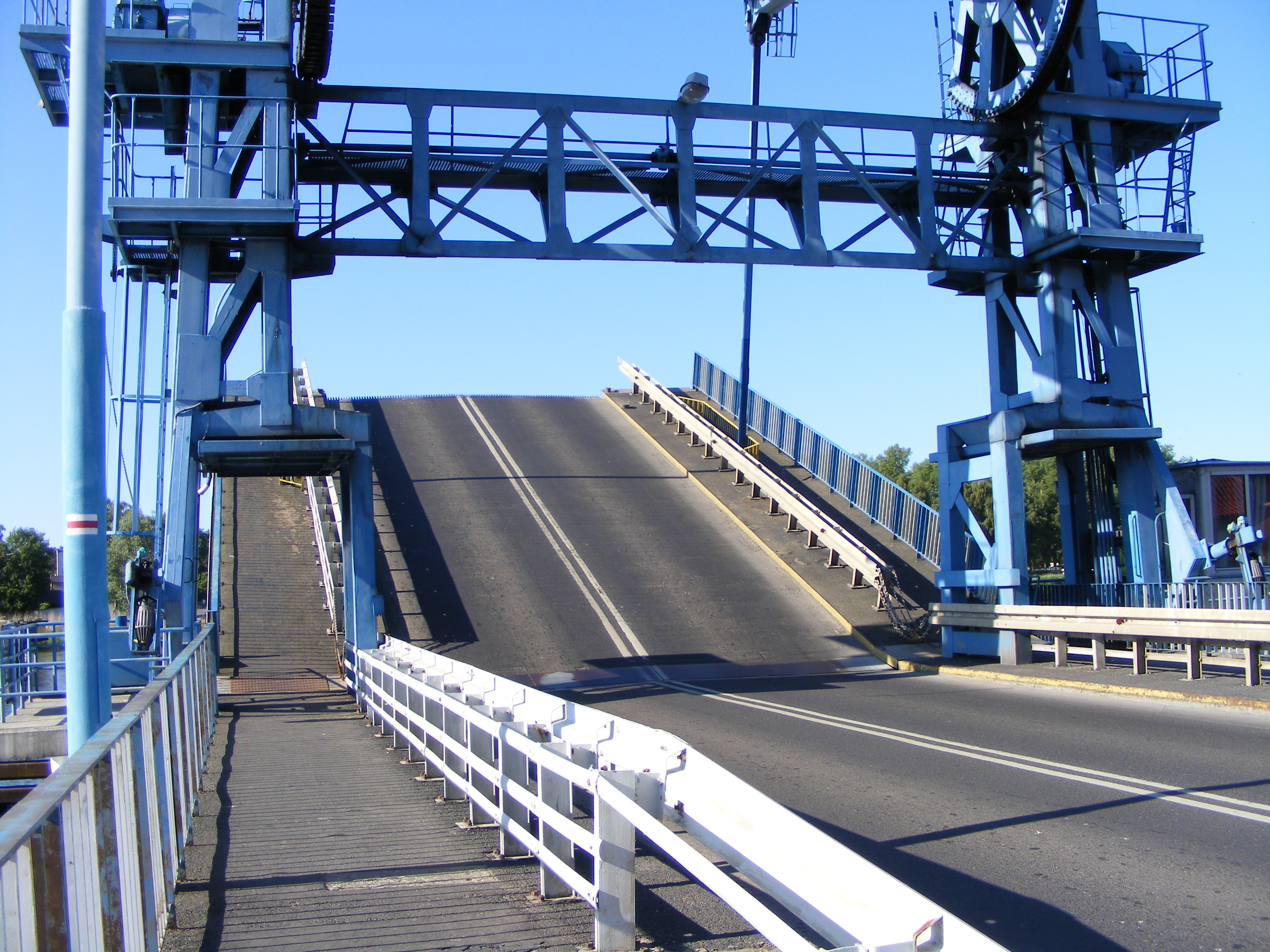
Bascule bridge

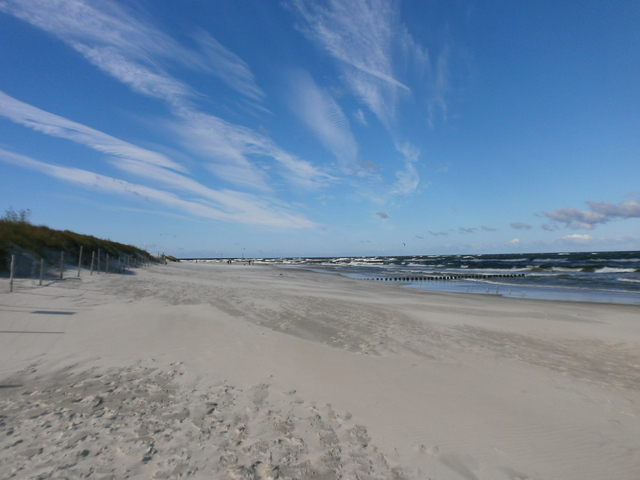
Beach
