= List of shipwrecks in September 1849 =

The list of shipwrecks in September 1849 includes ships sunk, foundered, wrecked, grounded, or otherwise lost during September 1849.

== 1 September ==
List of shipwrecks: 1 September 1849
Ship	State	Description
Emily	United Kingdom	The East Indiaman was wrecked in the Andaman Islands with the loss of five of her crew. She was on a voyage from Calcutta, India to Mauritius.
Estafette	France	The steamship was driven ashore in the Rhine. She was on a voyage from Rotterdam, South Holland, Netherlands to Dunkirk, Nord.
Star	United Kingdom	The brigantine ran aground on Key Lorrain, off Cape Breton Island, Nova Scotia, British North America. She was on a voyage from Liverpool, Lancashire to Halifax, Nova Scotia. She was refloated on 15 September and taken in to Louisbourg, Nova Scotia.

== 2 September ==
List of shipwrecks: 2 September 1849
Ship	State	Description
George Skolfield	United States	The ship was abandoned in the Atlantic Ocean. Her crew were rescued. She was on a voyage from Newport, Monmouthshire, United Kingdom to Boston, Massachusetts.
John and Isabella	United Kingdom	The ship ran aground on the Pennington Spit, in the Solent. She was refloated and taken in to Portsmouth, Hampshire in a leaky condition.
Ocean Hero	United Kingdom	The ship was driven ashore at "Flat River", Prince Edward Island, British North America. She was on a voyage from Charlottetown, Prince Edward Island to Liverpool, Lancashire. She was refloated and taken in to Georgetown, Prince Edward Island.
Orator	United Kingdom	The ship ran aground off Skagen, Denmark. She was on a voyage from Saint Petersburg, Russia to London. She was refloated on 9 September and resumed her voyage.
Simon Glover	United Kingdom	The brig sailed from Aux Cayes, Haiti for Falmouth, Cornwall, with mahogany and was not seen again.
Telegraph	Hamburg	The ship departed from La Guaira, Venezuela for Hamburg. No further trace, presumed foundered with the loss of all hands.

== 3 September ==
List of shipwrecks: 3 September 1849
Ship	State	Description
Arabella	United Kingdom	The ship ran aground on the Gunfleet Sand, in the North Sea off the coast of Essex. She was on a voyage from Saint Petersburg, Russia to London. She was refloated and resumed her voyage.
Lord Exmouth	United Kingdom	The ship was driven ashore near Blyth, Northumberland. She was on a voyage from South Shields, County Durham to Dublin. She was refloated and put back to South Shields.

== 4 September ==
List of shipwrecks: 4 September 1849
Ship	State	Description
Anne Marie	France	The ship foundered at the mouth of the Loire. She was on a voyage from Livorno, Grand Duchy of Tuscany to Nantes, Loire-Inférieure.
Camilla	United Kingdom	The paddle steamer was driven ashore at Larne, County Antrim. She was on a voyage from the Clyde to Belfast, County Antrim. She was refloated and put in to Belfast.
Deux Frères Unis	France	The ship ran aground at Savanilla, Republic of New Granada. She was on a voyage from Cartagena, Spain to Savanilla.
Jeune Nelly	France	The ship ran aground and sprang a leak at Pernambuco, Brazil. She was on a voyage from Bahia to Pernambuco.
Ocean	United Kingdom	The ship ran aground on the Pennington Spit, in the Solent. She was on a voyage from Southampton, Hampshire to Bristol, Gloucestershire. She was refloated and resumed her voyage.
Undaunted	United Kingdom	The ship ran aground at Bridlington, Yorkshire. She was on a voyage from London to Newcastle upon Tyne, Northumberland. She was refloated and taken in to Bridlington.
Vine	United Kingdom	The ship was driven ashore at the Holm of Copinsay, Orkney Islands. She was on a voyage from Riga, Russia to the Clyde. She was refloated and resumed her voyage.

== 5 September ==
List of shipwrecks: 5 September 1849
Ship	State	Description
Brant	Danzig	The ship ran aground on the Isola Rock, in the Orkney Islands, United Kingdom.
Challenge	United Kingdom	The ship was wrecked on Entry Island, Province of Quebec, British North America. She was on a voyage from "Cecaigne" to Liverpool, Lancashire.
Harriet	(United Kingdom of Great Britain and Ireland) Van Diemen's Land	The schooner was driven ashore at Little Swanport.
Henry Clay	United States	The ship was destroyed by fire at New York.
Jeune Ernest	France	The ship was wrecked near Vendres, Hérault.
Seaflower	United Kingdom	The ship sprang a leak and was beached at Eastbourne, Sussex. She was on a voyage from Guernsey, Channel Islands to London.

== 6 September ==
List of shipwrecks: 6 September 1849
Ship	State	Description
Almira	United States	The 84-foot-3-inch (25.68 m), 80.35-gross register ton scow schooner came ashore at Ashtabula, Ohio. She was refloated, repaired, and returned to service.
Catherine Ann	(United Kingdom of Great Britain and Ireland) New Zealand	The cutter was wrecked after it was driven onto rocks near Port Gore, in the Marlborough Sounds.
Gipsey	(United Kingdom of Great Britain and Ireland) New Zealand	The schooner was wrecked at Cape Turnagain. Her crew were rescued.
Istvan Yn Hertzeg	Flag unknown	The ship ran aground on the Muscle Bank, in the Irish Sea off the coast of County Waterford, United Kingdom. She was refloated.
Lamb	United Kingdom	The sloop collided with HMS Salamander (Royal Navy) and sank south east by south of Land's End, Cornwall. Her crew were rescued. She was on a voyage from Caernarfon to Portsmouth, Hampshire.
Ontario	United Kingdom	The ship ran aground at New Orleans, Louisiana, United States. She was on a voyage from New Orleans to London. She had been refloated by 17 September.

== 7 September ==
List of shipwrecks: 7 September 1849
Ship	State	Description
Demetrius	United Kingdom	The ship struck the Valler Rock and was damaged. She consequently put in to Appledore, Devon.

== 8 September ==
List of shipwrecks: 8 September 1849
Ship	State	Description
Admiral Hood	United Kingdom	The ship ran aground on the Whiting Sand, in the North Sea off the coast of Suffolk. She was on a voyage from Stockton-on-Tees, County Durham to Ipswich, Suffolk. She was refloated and assisted in to Harwich, Essex by Active and John and Mary (both United Kingdom). Being leaky, she took on extra hands and proceeded to Ipswich.
Anna Maria	Hamburg	The ship sank 4 nautical miles (7.4 km) south west of the Vlie. She was on a voyage from Antwerp, Belgium to Hamburgh.
Fortuna	Netherlands	The ship departed from Matanzas, Cuba for Rotterdam, South Holland. No further trace, presumed foundered with the loss of all hands.
Jane	United Kingdom	The brig sprang a leak and was abandoned in the Atlantic Ocean. Her crew were rescued by the barque Roderick Dhu (United States). Jane was on a voyage from Liverpool, Lancashire to a port in Alta California.

== 9 September ==
List of shipwrecks: 9 September 1849
Ship	State	Description
Actif	France	The ship was driven ashore. She was on a voyage from Cette, Hérault to Hamburg. She was refloated and put in to "Christinestad", where she arrived on 15 September.
Intrepid	(United Kingdom of Great Britain and Ireland) British North America	The schooner capsized in Griffin Cove, Province of Canada with the loss of a crew member. She was righted and put in to Gaspé.
Lavinia	United Kingdom	The ship was driven ashore in the Grand Pabos River. Her crew were rescued. She was refloated on 13 October.
Wasp	United Kingdom	The schooner was driven ashore and Newport, Province of Canada.

== 10 September ==
List of shipwrecks: 10 September 1849
Ship	State	Description
General Rosas	Argentina	The ship was wrecked on the Las Pipas Rocks. All on board were rescued. She was on a voyage from Patagonia to Buenos Aires.
Havre	France	The steamship ran aground in the Eider near "Eitzenloch".
Mary Ann	United Kingdom	The ship sank in the English Channel 6 nautical miles (11 km) off St. Catherine's Point, Isle of Wight. Her crew were rescued. She was on a voyage from Newcastle upon Tyne, Northumberland to Barcelona, Spain.

== 11 September ==
List of shipwrecks: 11 September 1849
Ship	State	Description
Gipsey	United Kingdom	The brig was wrecked at St. Margaret's Bay, Kent. Her crew were rescued. She was on a voyage from Hartlepool, County Durham to St. Margaret's Bay.
Robert Stride	United Kingdom	The ship was driven ashore on the coast of Yorkshire. She was refloated and put in to Hartlepool in a leaky condition.

== 12 September ==
List of shipwrecks: 12 September 1849
Ship	State	Description
Ashley	United Kingdom	The ship ran aground on the Tongue Sand, in the North Sea off the coast of Kent. She was on a voyage from Saint John, New Brunswick, British North America to London. She was refloated the next day.
Diana	United Kingdom	The schooner ran aground on Scroby Sands, Norfolk. She was refloated, and taken in tow for Great Yarmouth, Norfolk but subsequently drove ashore and was severely damaged when the tow rope broke. She was refloated again on 13 September and taken in to Great Yarmouth.
Elizabeth	United Kingdom	The sloop was in collision with Susquehanna (United States) and sank in Liverpool Bay. Her crew were rescued by a pilot boat. She was on a voyage from Carmarthen to Liverpool, Lancashire.
Fleuras	France	The lugger was lost 5 leagues (15 nautical miles (28 km)) north of the mouth of the Adour.
Hannah Grayson	United Kingdom	The ship was driven ashore and wrecked on the Long Rocks of Ballywalter, County Antrim. Her crew were rescued. She was on a voyage from Arkhangelsk, Russia to Bideford, Devon. She was refloated on 15 September and taken in to Belfast, County Antrim for repairs.
Madagascar	United Kingdom	The ship sprang a leak and was beached at Havana, Cuba. She was on a voyage from Liverpool to Havana. Madagascar was refloated on 25 September and taken in to Havana.
Normandie de la Hongre	France	The ship was driven ashore at "Knevel". She was on a voyage from Bordeaux, Gironde to Hamburg. She was refloated and taken in to L'Orient, Morbihan, where she arrived on 14 September.
Orion	Grand Duchy of Oldenburg	The ship was abandoned in the Atlantic Ocean. Her five crew were rescued by Pacha (United Kingdom). Orion was on a voyage from Wilmington, Delaware, United States to Amsterdam, North Holland, Netherlands.
Sincerity	United Kingdom	The schooner sank at Donaghadee, County Antrim. She was on a voyage from Dublin to the Clyde.
Tiber	Kingdom of Sardinia	The brig was driven ashore near the Casa Fuerte de la Cruceta, Almería, Spain. She was on a voyage from Cuba to Marseille, Bouches-du-Rhône. She was refloated and taken in to Almería.
Wreath	United Kingdom	The ship was driven ashore at Harwich, Essex. She was refloated.
Zodiaque	France	The ship was wrecked at the mouth of the Gironde. Her crew were rescued. She was on a voyage from Newcastle upon Tyne, Northumberland, United Kingdom to Bordeaux, Gironde.

== 13 September ==
List of shipwrecks: 13 September 1849
Ship	State	Description
Ann	United Kingdom	The ship ran aground at Penzance, Cornwall.
Confidence	United Kingdom	The schooner ran aground on Scroby Sands, Norfolk. She was refloated and resumed her voyage.
Diamond	United Kingdom	The ship was driven ashore at Westness, Forfarshire. Shew as refloated on 14 September and taken in to Arbroath.
Dorothy Ann	United Kingdom	The ship ran aground off "Burgs", Sweden. She was on a voyage from Riga, Russia to Sunderland, County Durham. She was refloated and resumed her voyage.
Guysborough Packet	(United Kingdom of Great Britain and Ireland) British North America	The ship was wrecked at Liscombe Mills, Nova Scotia. All on board were rescued. She was on a voyage from Guysborough to Halifax, Nova Scotia.
Lady Newborough	United Kingdom	The ship was driven ashore west of Ceuta, Spain. She was on a voyage from Brăila, Ottoman Empire to Limerick. She was refloated and put in to Gibraltar.
Sarah Trotman	United Kingdom	The ship was lost in the Formosa Channel. Her crew were rescued by the schooner Dart (United States). Sarah Trotman was on a voyage from Shanghai, China to London.
Seid	United Kingdom	The ship was wrecked on Düne, Heligoland. Her crew were rescued. She was on a voyage from an English port to Hamburg.

== 14 September ==
List of shipwrecks: 14 September 1849
Ship	State	Description
Fortuna	United Kingdom	The ship ran aground on the Goodwin Sands, Kent. She was on a voyage from Genoa, Kingdom of Sardinia to London. She was refloated.

== 15 September ==
List of shipwrecks: 15 September 1849
Ship	State	Description
Atkin	United Kingdom	The ship ran aground off Ljugard, Sweden. She was on a voyage from Kronstadt, Russia to Newcastle upon Tyne, Northumberland.
Indefatigable	Peru	The brigantine was wrecked at the mouth of the Tumbes River. She was on a voyage from Lima to Guayaquil, Ecuador.
Liberty	United Kingdom	The ship ran aground on the Whitby Rock. She was on a voyage from Middlesbrough, Yorkshire to London. She was refloated and put in to Whitby, Yorkshire in a leaky condition.
Maranham	United Kingdom	The ship ran aground on the Brake Sand, in the North Sea off the coast of Kent. She was on a voyage from South Shields, County Durham to Boston, Massachusetts, United States. She was refloated and taken in to The Downs.

== 16 September ==
List of shipwrecks: 16 September 1849
Ship	State	Description
Eliza	(United Kingdom of Great Britain and Ireland) Van Diemen's Land	The ship was driven ashore on Flinders Island.
Mary Ann Henry	United Kingdom	The ship was driven ashore on North Cape, Prince Edward Island, British North America. She was on a voyage from Buctouche New Brunswick to Liverpool, Lancashire.
Peak Head	United Kingdom	The ship ran aground at Whitby, Yorkshire.

== 17 September ==
List of shipwrecks: 17 September 1849
Ship	State	Description
Swallow	(United Kingdom of Great Britain and Ireland) British North America	The ship was wrecked on Fortune Island.
Thomsons	(United Kingdom of Great Britain and Ireland) South Australia	The cutter was lost in Guichen Bay with the loss of all hands.

== 18 September ==
List of shipwrecks: 18 September 1849
Ship	State	Description
Anna	United Kingdom	The schooner ran aground on the Krautsand. She was on a voyage from Hartlepool, County Durham to Hamburg. She was refloated and taken in to the Weser.
Hamburg Packet	United Kingdom	The ship was wrecked on Neuwerk.

== 19 September ==
List of shipwrecks: 19 September 1849
Ship	State	Description
Home	United Kingdom	The ship ran aground in the Dardanelles. She was refloated.
San Andres Apostolo	Hamburg	The ship was wrecked off Grand Bahama, Bahamas. Her crew were rescued. She was on a voyage from Havana, Cuba to Hamburg.

== 20 September ==
List of shipwrecks: 20 September 1849
Ship	State	Description
Anne	United Kingdom	The barque sprang a leak and foundered 20 nautical miles (37 km) off Cape Wrath, Caithness. A message in a bottle was washed up at Hartlepool, County Durham on 1 September 1860 detailing the event.
Commodore Napier	United Kingdom	The barque was wrecked on a reef in the White Sea 6 nautical miles (11 km) south of Cross Island, Russia. Her crew were rescued. She was on a voyage from Dundee, Forfarshire to Arkhangelsk, Russia.
Thistle	(United Kingdom of Great Britain and Ireland) British North America	The ship was driven ashore at Plum Point, Jamaica. She was on a voyage from Halifax, Nova Scotia to Kingston, Jamaica.

== 21 September ==
List of shipwrecks: 21 September 1849
Ship	State	Description
Carl Magnus	Denmark	The ship struck a sunken rock and was damaged at Porto, Portugal. She was on a voyage from Porto to Helsingør. She put back to Porto for repairs.
Dart	United Kingdom	The ship ran aground in the River Dee.
Earl of Kellie	United Kingdom	The ship was driven ashore and wreckednnear Sandhamn, Sweden. She was on a voyage from Pillau, Kingdom of Prussia to Kirkcaldy, Fife.
Fanny and Jane	United Kingdom	The ship was driven ashore west of Selsey Bill, Sussex. She was on a voyage from Sines, Portugal to London. She was refloated the next day and resumed her voyage.
Flora	United Kingdom	The ship foundered in the Atlantic Ocean. Her crew were rescued. She was on a voyage from Liverpool, Lancashire to Charleston, South Carolina.
John and Henry	United Kingdom	The ship was driven ashore at the Landguard Fort, Essex. She was refloated on 30 September and towed in to Ipswich, Suffolk.
John Horton	United Kingdom	The ship was lost at Punta Arenas, Chile. Her crew were rescued.
Ocean Queen	United Kingdom	The full-rigged ship caught fire and was abandoned whilst on a voyage from a British port to Suez, Egypt. Two of four boats were subsequently reported missing with those on board feared lost.
Oporto	United Kingdom	The ship ran aground in the River Dee.

== 22 September ==
List of shipwrecks: 22 September 1849
Ship	State	Description
Clio	United Kingdom	The ship was driven ashore near Salcombe, Devon. Her crew were rescued. She was on a voyage from Salcombe to Newport, Monmouthshire.
Commerce	United Kingdom	The ship ran aground on the Sunk Sand, in the North Sea off the coast of Essex and sank. All on board were rescued. She was on a voyage from Kragerø, Norway to Havre de Grâce, Seine-Inférieure, France.
Elize	Kingdom of Hanover	The ship was wrecked on Bornholm, Denmark. Her crew were rescued. She was on a voyage from Elsfleth to Memel, Prussia.
Lady Mary Pelham	(United Kingdom of Great Britain and Ireland) New South Wales	The ship was driven ashore and severely damaged in Portland Bay.
Maria	France	The barque was wrecked on the Praia d'Assu. All on board were rescued. She was on a voyage from Havre de Grâce, Seine-Inférieure to Rio de Janeiro, Brazil.
Martha	(United Kingdom of Great Britain and Ireland) British North America	The schooner foundered off White Head, Nova Scotia.
Mary Ann	United Kingdom	The ship was driven ashore and severely damaged at the entrance to Strangford Lough. She was on a voyage from Maryport, Cumberland to Newry, County Antrim Mary Ann was refloated on 29 September and taken in to Strangford, County Antrim for repairs.
San Francesco	Malta	The ship ran aground in the Dardanelles. She was refloated.
William	United Kingdom	The ship sprang a leak and was beached near Ramsey, Isle of Man. She was on a voyage from Liverpool, Lancashire to Newcastle upon Tyne, Northumberland. She was later refloated and taken in to Ramsey for repairs.

== 23 September ==
List of shipwrecks: 23 September 1849
Ship	State	Description
Bergen Jarl	Norway	The ship ran aground on the Longsand, in the North Sea off the coast of Essex, United Kingdom. She was on a voyage from Christiania to Dieppe, Seine-Inférieure, France. She was refloated and assisted in to Harwich, Essex in a waterlogged condition.
Despatch	United Kingdom	The ship was wrecked on English Point, British North America with the loss of a crew member. She was on a voyage from Bristol, Gloucestershire to Quebec City, Province of Canada, British North America. Despatch was refloated on 2 November and taken in to Quebec City.
Fama	United Kingdom	The ship was driven ashore at North Cape, Prince Edward Island, British North America. She was on a voyage from Cork to Richibucto, New Brunswick, British North America.
Margaret and Emily	United Kingdom	The ship was wrecked on the Gunfleet Sand, in the North Sea off the coast of Essex. Her crew were rescued. She was on a voyage from Seaham, County Durham to London.
Trident	United States	The ship ran aground on the Cork Sand, in the North Sea off the coast of Essex. She was on a voyage from Amsterdam, North Holland, Netherlands to New York She was refloated with assistance from the smacks Five Brothers, George IV and Lalla Rookh (all United Kingdom) and put in to Harwich.

== 24 September ==
List of shipwrecks: 24 September 1849
Ship	State	Description
Agenoria	United Kingdom	The ship ran aground on the Arklow Bank, in the Irish Sea off the coast of County Wicklow. She was on a voyage from Puerto Rico to the Clyde. She was refloated and put in to Kingstown, County Dublin.
Louth	United Kingdom	The ship departed from London for Sunderland, County Durham. No further trace, presumed foundered with the loss of all hands.

== 25 September ==
List of shipwrecks: 25 September 1849
Ship	State	Description
Argyle	United Kingdom	The schooner flat was driven ashore at Arklow, County Wicklow. She was refloated on 20 October and taken in to Arklow.
Frau Wilhelmina	Netherlands	The ship was sighted in the Øresund whilst on a voyage from Riga, Russian Empire to the Maas (French: Meuse). No further trace, presumed foundered with the loss of all hands.
Hernosand	Sweden	The ship was wrecked in the Weser Guarken. Her crew were rescued. She was on a voyage from "Calia" to Newcastle upon Tyne, Northumberland, United Kingdom.
Rhodes	United Kingdom	The ship was destroyed by fire in the Atlantic Ocean. Her crew were rescued by Wrights (United Kingdom). Rhodes was on a voyage from Saint John, New Brunswick, British North America to the River Tyne.
Tigris	United Kingdom	The ship ran aground on the Dulas Rocks, off the coast of Anglesey. She was on a voyage from Liverpool, Lancashire to Calcutta, India. She was refloated and assisted back to Liverpool.

== 26 September ==
List of shipwrecks: 26 September 1849
Ship	State	Description
Betsey	United Kingdom	The ship was driven ashore at Alderney, Channel Islands.
HMS Dwarf	Royal Navy	The steamship was in collision with HMS Trident (Royal Navy) in the Atlantic Ocean 60 nautical miles (110 km) south east of the Old Head of Kinsale, County Cork and was severely damaged. Her crew were taken off by HMS Trident, which towed HMS Dwarf in to Kinsale, County Cork in a sinking condition.
Elizabeth	United Kingdom	The brig was in collision with Lamburn (United Kingdom) and was abandoned off Happisburgh, Norfolk. Her crew were rescued by Lamburn.
Enterprise	United Kingdom	The brig was driven ashore at Annagassan, County Louth. Her crew were rescued. She was on a voyage from Matanzas, Cuba to the Clyde.
Fanny	United Kingdom	The ship struck a rock and was damaged at Montrose, Forfarshire. She was on a voyage from Montrose to Aberdeen. She consequently put back to Montrose.
Marmora	United Kingdom	The schooner was beached at Newlyn, Cornwall. She was refloated on 28 September and taken in to Newlyn.
Sultana	United Kingdom	The ship was wrecked on the Troubridge Shoals. All on board were rescued. She was on a voyage from London to Adelaide, South Australia.
Tyneside	United Kingdom	The wherry capsized in the River Tyne. Her three crew survived.
William and Mary	United Kingdom	The ship was driven ashore and wrecked at Drogheda, County Louth. Her crew were rescued. She was on a voyage from Bridgwater, Somerset to Greenock, Renfrewshire. William and Mary was refloated on 2 October and taken in to Drogheda for repairs.

== 27 September ==
List of shipwrecks: 27 September 1849
Ship	State	Description
Cambria	United Kingdom	The paddle steamer suffered a broken main shaft in the Irish Sea 20 nautical miles (37 km) off Holyhead, Anglesey. Her passengers were taken off by HMS Banshee (Royal Navy). Cambria was on a voyage from Kingstown, County Dublin to Holyhead. She was towed in to Holyhead by Hibernia (United Kingdom).
Fairy Queen	United Kingdom	The yacht was driven ashore and wrecked at the Mumbles, Glamorgan.
Good Intent	United Kingdom	The ship was driven ashore and damaged at Ness Point, Suffolk.
Hero	Stettin	The steamship foundered off the coast of Norway. Her crew were rescued by the brig Symmetry (United Kingdom). Hero was on a voyage from South Shields, County Durham, United Kingdom to Stettin.
Mathilda	United Kingdom	The ship ran aground on the Swine Bottoms, in the Baltic Sea. She was on a voyage from Troon, Ayrshire to Hornbæk, Denmark.
Mayflower	United Kingdom	The sloop was driven ashore at Pakefield, Suffolk.

== 28 September ==
List of shipwrecks: 28 September 1849
Ship	State	Description
Province	France	The ship was wrecked at Inagua, Bahamas. She was on a voyage from Port-au-Prince, Haiti to Havre de Grâce, Seine-Inférieure.
Rio	United Kingdom	The ship was abandoned in the Atlantic Ocean. Her crew were rescued by Georgia (United States). Rio was on a voyage from Newcastle upon Tyne, Northumberland to New York, United States.
St. Pierre	France	The ship was driven ashore at Blakeney, Norfolk, United Kingdom. She was on a voyage from Scarborough, Yorkshire to a French port. She was refloated and taken in to Wells-next-the-Sea, Norfolk.

== 29 September ==
List of shipwrecks: 29 September 1849
Ship	State	Description
Amelia Gordon	United Kingdom	The brig was wrecked on the Praia St. Thomé. All on board were rescued. She was on a voyage from Glasgow, Renfrewshire to Rio de Janeiro, Brazil.
Catherine	United Kingdom	The ship ran aground on the Levin Sands, off the coast of Anglesey. She was on a voyage from Fowey, Cornwall to Liverpool, Lancashire.
Comfort	(United Kingdom of Great Britain and Ireland) New Zealand	The schooner capsized in the Cook Strait with the loss of all hands. She was subsequently towed in to Queen Charlotte's Island.
Conductor	United Kingdom	The smack was driven ashore and wrecked at the entrance to the Larne Lough with the loss of all hands.
Neptunus	Stettin	The ship ran aground on the Oder Bank, in the Baltic Sea, and sank. Her crew were rescued. She was on a voyage from Grangemouth, Stirlingshire, United Kingdom to Stettin.
Ocean	(United Kingdom of Great Britain and Ireland) South Australia	The ship hit rocks near Pencarrow Head at the entrance to Wellington Harbour. She had put into Wellington to replenish supplies on a voyage from Adelaide to Callao, Peru.
Sally	United Kingdom	The smack was driven ashore and wrecked at Carnfield Point, County Louth. She was on a voyage from Dublin to Rathlin Island, County Antrim.
Triumph	(United Kingdom of Great Britain and Ireland) New Zealand	The schooner was wrecked in the "Wairu River", Van Diemen's Land.

== 30 September ==
List of shipwrecks: 30 September 1849
Ship	State	Description
Active	United Kingdom	The ship was driven ashore and wrecked at Ballyquinton Point, County Antrim. Her crew were rescued. She was on a voyage from Dublin to Whitehaven, Cumberland.
Aid	United Kingdom	The ship was driven ashore between Hartlepool and Seaton Carew, County Durham. Her crew were rescued. She was refloated on 6 October and taken in to Hartlepool.
Albion	United Kingdom	The brig was driven ashore and wrecked near Redcar, Yorkshire with the loss of all hands.
Black Diamond	United Kingdom	The ship was driven ashore and wrecked at Whitby, Yorkshire.
Brancepeth Castle	United Kingdom	The brig ran aground on the Goodwin Sands, Kent. She was refloated and resumed her voyage.
Britannia	United Kingdom	The steamship sank at South Shields, County Durham.
Confidence	Denmark	The schooner was driven ashore on Skagen. All on board were rescued.
Cumberland	United Kingdom	The ship was driven ashore between Hartlepool and Seaton Carew. Her crew were rescued.
Curlew	United Kingdom	The ship was driven ashore between Hartlepool and Seaton Carew. Her crew were rescued.
Elizabeth	United Kingdom	The ship was driven ashore between Hartlepool and Seaton Carew. Her crew were rescued.
Fortitude	United Kingdom	The ship was driven ashore near the mouth of the River Tees. Her crew were rescued.
Frankfort	United Kingdom	The ship was driven ashore near Redcar. Her crew were rescued. She was on a voyage from Ipswich, Suffolk to South Shields. She was refloated on 18 October and taken in to Middlesbrough, Yorkshire.
George and Eleanor	United Kingdom	The ship was driven ashore between Hartlepool and Seaton Carew. Her crew were rescued.
Hamus	Kingdom of Hanover	The ship was driven ashore at Whitby.
Hudgill	United Kingdom	The ship was driven ashore between Hartlepool and Seaton Carew. She was refloated the next day and taken in to Hartlepool in a severely damaged condition.
James and Francis	United Kingdom	The brig was driven ashore between Hartlepool and Seaton Carew. Her crew were rescued.
Johannes	Danzig	The brig was driven ashore and wrecked near Redcar. Her crew were rescued. She was on a voyage from Sunderland, County Durham to Danzig.
John	United Kingdom	The ship was wrecked on Skagen. Her crew were rescued. She was on a voyage from Gothenburg, Sweden to Newcastle upon Tyne, Northumberland.
John	United Kingdom	The schooner was driven ashore and wrecked near Redcar with the loss of all hands.
John Saltcoats	United Kingdom	The collier was wrecked at Coatham, Yorkshire with the loss of all ten crew.
John Watson	United Kingdom	The brig was driven ashore between Hartlepool and Seaton Carew. Her crew were rescued.
Louise	Prussia	The ship was driven ashore and wrecked at Staintondale, Yorkshire. Her crew were rescued. She was on a voyage from Hull, Yorkshire to Hartlepool, County Durham.
Malta	United Kingdom	The ship was driven ashore between Hartlepool and Seaton Carew. Her crew were rescued.
Mary and Maria	United Kingdom	The ship foundered in the North Sea off the coast of County Durham with the loss of all hands. She was on a voyage from Seaham, County Durham to Caen, Calvados, France.
Nimrod	United Kingdom	The ship was driven ashore between Hartlepool and Seaton Carew. Her crew were rescued.
Othello	Kingdom of Hanover	The ship was driven ashore at "Collier Hope", Yorkshire. She was refloated.
Portland	United Kingdom	The ship struck the pier and was severely damaged at Ramsey, Isle of Man. She was on a voyage from Liverpool, Lancashire to Strangford, County Antrim.
Rainbow	United Kingdom	The ship was driven ashore on the Holderness, coast, Yorkshire. She was refloated on 1 November and taken in to Whitby, Yorkshire.
Raven	United Kingdom	The schooner was wrecked in Ballyholme Bay. Her three crew were rescued. She was on a voyage from Maryport, Cumberland to Belfast, County Antrim.
Rocket	United Kingdom	The schooner was driven ashore at Whitby. She was refloated on 3 October and towed in to Whitby.
Swallow	United Kingdom	The ship was driven ashore between Hartlepool and Seaton Carew. Her crew were rescued.
Syren	United Kingdom	The ship was driven ashore between Hartlepool and Seaton Carew with the loss of a crew member.
Tyne	United Kingdom	The ship was holed by an anchor and sank at Whitby. She was refloated on 2 October.
Tyneside	United Kingdom	The brig was driven ashore and wrecked at Sunderland. Her crew were rescued by the Sunderland Lifeboat. She was refloated on 15 October and towed in to Sunderland, where she sank. She was raised on 22 October and placed under repair.
Uranus	United Kingdom	The ship was driven ashore at Whitby. She was refloated on 1 October and taken in to Whitby.
Verbena	United Kingdom	The ship was driven ashore in Frenchman's Bay. She was on a voyage from Bridlington, Yorkshire to Saint Petersburg, Russia. She was refloated on 17 October but capsized and drove ashore on the Herd Sand, in the North Sea off the coast of County Durham.
Vier Gebruder	Netherlands	The brig was driven ashore between Hartlepool and Seaton Carew Her crew were rescued.
Voyager	United Kingdom	The ship was driven ashore between Hartlepool and Seaton Carew Her crew were rescued.
Wrangel	Stettin	The brig was driven ashore and damaged at Whitby. She was refloated on 3 October.
X. Y. Z.	United Kingdom	The schooner was driven ashore between Hartlepool and Seaton Carew Her crew were rescued. She was refloated on 5 October and towed in to Hartlepool.

== Unknown date ==
List of shipwrecks: Unknown date 1849
Ship	State	Description
Charlotte Geiffin	Flag unknown	The ship ran aground in the Dardanelles. She was refloated three days later.
Coquette	United States	The barque was dismasted in a typhoon off the coast of China. She was subsequently captured by pirates and destroyed. Her crew were rescued.
Echo	France	The brig foundered 50 nautical miles (93 km) west north west of Cape Roche, Portugal. Her crew were rescued by the schooner Pilot (United Kingdom). Echo was on a voyage from Dunkirk, Nord to St. Ubes, Portugal.
Eliza	France	The ship was wrecked on the Spanish coast. She was on a voyage from Tetouan, Morocco to Marseille, Bouches-du-Rhône.
Elspeth	United Kingdom	The ship was lost off Blanc Sablon, Province of Canada, British North America in late September.
Emily	United Kingdom	The ship was wrecked in the Andaman Islands before 20 September with the loss of six lives and others reported missing. There were eight confirmed survivors.
Etoile de la Mer	France	The ship was wrecked at Cap Blanc, Beylik of Tunis before 23 September. She was on a voyage from Tunis to Marseille.
Gipsey	(United Kingdom of Great Britain and Ireland) New Zealand	The schooner was wrecked at Castle Point, Wellington before 8 September. Her crew survived.
Ingegno	Russia	The ship was destroyed by fire in the Sea of Marmora before 12 September. She was on a voyage from and English port to Odesa.
Juverna	(United Kingdom of Great Britain and Ireland) British North America	The brig was driven ashore near Saint John, New Brunswick before 8 September. She was later refloated and taken in to Saint John.
Leda	France	The ship was abandoned in the Atlantic Ocean off Cape Hatteras, North Carolina, United States before 13 September. She was on a voyage from Nicaragua to Marseille.
Lydie	France	The ship departed from Guadeloupe for Marseille. No further trace, presumed foundered with the loss of all hands.
Madona de Hydra	Flag unknown	The ship was lost near Cyprus.
Maria Louisa	(United Kingdom of Great Britain and Ireland) British North America	The schooner was driven ashore at "Malbay", Province of Canada between 13 and 20 September. She was on a voyage from Quebec City, Province of Canada to Halifax, Nova Scotia.
Memnon	United States	The clipper was lost in the Gaspar Strait on 14 or 16 September.
Ocean	(United Kingdom of Great Britain and Ireland) New Zealand	The schooner was lost in the Chatham Islands.
Palemon	United Kingdom	The ship was wrecked 90 nautical miles (170 km) north of Port Hood, Nova Scotia, British North America. She was on a voyage from Bouctouche, New Brunswick, British North America to London.
Stirer Wustrow	Flag unknown	The ship ran aground in the Dardanelles. She was refloated three days later.
Sylph	United Kingdom	The ship was reported missing in a typhoon off the coast of China. She was subsequently reported to have been captured by pirates.
Union	Prussia	The brig was lost in the Mediterranean Sea. She was on a voyage from New York, United States to Cette, Hérault, France.
Zeno	United Kingdom	The brig was destroyed by fire at LaHave, Nova Scotia.
