= Kalen (disambiguation) =

Kalen is a given name.

Kalen may also refer to:

- Kalen, North Macedonia, a village in North Macedonia
- Kaleń (disambiguation), various settlements in Poland
- Kälen, a village in Sweden
