= List of shipwrecks in August 1850 =

The list of shipwrecks in August 1850 includes ships sunk, foundered, wrecked, grounded, or otherwise lost during August 1850.

== 1 August ==
List of shipwrecks: 1 August 1850
Ship	State	Description
Constantine	(Russian Empire) Grand Duchy of Finland	The ship struck rocks off Cape Malabar, Morocco and was consequently beached in Tangier Bay. She was on a voyage from Cagliari, Sardinia to Helsingør, Denmark. She was refloated in mid-September and towed in to Gibraltar in a waterlogged condition.
William and James	(United Kingdom of Great Britain and Ireland) New Zealand	The mail cutter was wrecked near the Sugar Loaf Islands, Taranaki, with the loss of one female passenger.

== 2 August ==
List of shipwrecks: 2 August 1850
Ship	State	Description
Christina Pitcairn	United Kingdom	The ship departed from Arkhangelsk, Russia for London. Presumed subsequently foundered with the loss of all hands.
Rose	United Kingdom	The ship was wrecked on Green Island, British North America. She was on a voyage from Prince Edward Island, British North America to an English port.

== 3 August ==
List of shipwrecks: August 1850
Ship	State	Description
Botalog	United Kingdom	The sloop sprang a leak and foundered off Buck Head, Caernarfonshire. She was on a voyage from Caernarfon to Aberdyfi, Merionethshire.
Hope	United States	The ship was driven ashore. She was on a voyage from Baltimore, Maryland to Saint John's, Newfoundland, British North America.

== 4 August ==
List of shipwrecks: 4 August 1850
Ship	State	Description
Bridgetown	United Kingdom	The ship was wrecked at Clam Cove, near Cape Race, Newfoundland, British North America with the loss of three lives. She was on a voyage from Liverpool, Lancashire to Quebec City, Province of Canada, British North America.
De Ringende Jacob	Prussia	The ship ran aground on the Goodwin Sands, Kent, United Kingdom. She was on a voyage from Memel to Hastings, Sussex, United Kingdom. She was refloated and taken in to The Downs.
Henry	United States	The ship was driven ashore on Skagen, Denmark. She was on a voyage from Matanzas, Cuba to Saint Petersburg, Russia. She was refloated.
Prince Arthur	United Kingdom	The paddle steamer was run ashore and wrecked between Formby and Southport, Lancashire with the loss of two of her crew. She was on a voyage from Preston, Lancashire to the Menai Strait.

== 5 August ==
List of shipwrecks: 5 August 1850
Ship	State	Description
Eagle	United Kingdom	The steamship struck a rock off Saint John, Virgin Islands and was damaged. She put in to Saint Thomas for repairs.
Sir John Newport	United Kingdom	The ship ran aground on the Nore. She was on a voyage from Waterford to London. She was refloated and resumed her voyage.
Venus	Stralsund	The ship was wrecked at "Thornby", Denmark, Her crew were rescued. She was on a voyage from Hartlepool, County Durham, United Kingdom to Stettin.

== 6 August ==
List of shipwrecks: 6 August 1850
Ship	State	Description
Cæsarea	United Kingdom	The ship was wrecked on the English Bank, in the River Plate. Her crew were rescued. She was on a voyage from London to Buenos Aires, Argentina.
Dion	United Kingdom	The ship ran aground off Trelleborg, Denmark. She was refloated and put in to Helsingør, Denmark in a leaky condition.
Edmond	Belgium	The ship was driven ashore and wrecked at Barrossa, Spain. She was on a voyage from Antwerp to Naples, Kingdom of the Two Sicilies.
Isabella	United Kingdom	The ship was destroyed by fire at Penang, Malaya. She was on a voyage from Glasgow, Renfrewshire to Singapore.
Mantura	United Kingdom	The ship was driven ashore at Certadura, Spain. She was on a voyage from Newport, Monmouthshire to Palermo, Sicily. She was refloated and taken in to Cádiz for repairs.
Maria	United Kingdom	The sloop was wrecked on the Gore Sands, in the Bristol Channel with the loss of both crew.
Pourvoyeur	France	The steamship was driven ashore. She was on a voyage from Livorno, Grand Duchy of Tuscany to Genoa, Kingdom of Sardinia to Marseille, Bouches-du-Rhône. She was refloated.

== 7 August ==
List of shipwrecks: 7 August 1850
Ship	State	Description
Ariadne	United Kingdom	The East Indiaman, a full-rigged ship, was wrecked on Saugor Island, India with the loss of all but one of her crew. She was on a voyage from Calcutta, India to Liverpool, Lancashire.
Express	United Kingdom	The ship ran aground at Birkenhead, Cheshire. She was on a voyage from Liverpool, Lancashire to Bahia, Brazil.
Hope	United Kingdom	The sloop foundered on the Mixon Shoal, in the Bristol Channel with the loss of all three crew.
Hope	(United Kingdom of Great Britain and Ireland) Isle of Man	The smack was driven ashore at Ramsey.
Manchester	United Kingdom	The East Indiaman was wrecked on Saugor Island. Her crew were rescued. She was on a voyage from Calcutta to London.
Maria Helene	(Denmark) Duchy of Schleswig	The ship was driven ashore on Spiekeroog, Kingdom of Hanover. Her crew were rescued. She was on a voyage from Hartlepool, County Durham to Kiel, Prussia.
Prince de Joinville	France	The ship was driven ashore at Torrecervellos, Spain. She was on a voyage from Dunkirk, Nord to Marseille, Bouches-du-Rhône.

== 8 August ==
List of shipwrecks: 8 August 1850
Ship	State	Description
Agent	United Kingdom	The ship was wrecked on the English Bank, in the River Plate. Her crew were rescued. She was on a voyage from Cardiff, Glamorgan to the Pacific Ocean.
Amanda	Prussia	The brigantine ran aground at Quebec City, Province of Canada, British North America. She was refloated and resumed her voyage.
Defence	United Kingdom	The ship was abandoned in the English Channel. Her crew were rescued. She was on a voyage from Guernsey, Channel Islands to London.
George	United Kingdom	The ship ran aground on a reef off Tatamagouche, Nova Scotia, British North America. She was on a voyage from Tatamagouche to Liverpool, Lancashire.
Gift	United Kingdom	The brig was wrecked at Portland Creek, Newfoundland, British North America. Her crew were rescued. She was on a voyage from Montreal, Province of Canada to an English port.
Owner's Delight	United Kingdom	The ship was driven ashore and damaged at Beachy Head, Sussex and was abandoned by her crew. She was refloated by the Coast Guard.
Pearl	United Kingdom	The schooner was driven ashore at Cochin, India. She was refloated on 13 August.
Pharsalia	United States	The ship ran aground and was wrecked in the Hooghly River. She was on a voyage from Calcutta, India to Boston, Massachusetts.
Sea Flower	(United Kingdom of Great Britain and Ireland) British North America	The schooner was wrecked at Pictou, Nova Scotia. Her crew survived.
Tweed	United Kingdom	The ship sprang a leak and sank in the Bristol Channel 6 nautical miles (11 km) south south east of the Nash Point Lighthouse, Glamorgan. Her crew were rescued. She was on a voyage from Cardiff, Glamorgan to Gibraltar.

== 9 August ==
List of shipwrecks: 9 August 1850
Ship	State	Description
Ann and Eliza	United Kingdom	The ship was driven ashore at Cairnbulg Head, Aberdeenshire. She was on a voyage from Glasgow, Renfrewshire to Stettin. She was refloated the next day and assisted in to Fraserburgh, Aberdeenshire in a sinking condition. She was repaired but subsequently sank on 8 September 1849.
Earl of Hardwicke	United Kingdom	The ship was driven ashore in the Auckland Islands, New Zealand. She was later refloated and taken in to Sydney, New South Wales for repairs, where she arrived on 12 September.
Napoleon	France	The steamship foundered in the North Sea off the mouth of the Humber. Her crew were rescued by Transit (United Kingdom).
Swift	United Kingdom	The ship sprang a leak and was beached at Bannow, County Wexford. She was on a voyage from Newport, Monmouthshire to Waterford or Wexford. She was refloated on 5 September and resumed her voyage.

== 10 August ==
List of shipwrecks: 10 August 1850
Ship	State	Description
Drie Gebroeders	Netherlands	The ship was driven ashore at Landskrona, Sweden. She was on a voyage from Amsterdam, North Holland to Danzig.
Egberdina	Netherlands	The ship was wrecked at Hook of Holland, South Holland with the loss of two of the eight people on board. She was on a voyage from Sunderland, County Durham, United Kingdom to Rotterdam, South Holland.
Hannahs	United Kingdom	The ship struck rocks off Berwick upon Tweed, Northumberland and was damaged. She was on a voyage from Newcastle upon Tyne, Northumberland to Leith, Lothian. She consequently put in to Berwick upon Tweed in a leaky condition.
Palendar	(United Kingdom of Great Britain and Ireland) British North America	The ship was driven ashore on Cape Sable Island, Nova Scotia. She was on a voyage from Yarmouht to Pugwash. She was refloated and taken in to Yarmouth for repairs.
Pandora	United Kingdom	The ship was presumed to have foundered off the coast of France with the loss of all hands. A message in a bottle washed up on the coast of Jersey, Channel Islands on 13 September. The message read "Aug. 10 1850. The Pandora merchant vessel, off the coast of France, laden with rum and sugar. All is over; God forgive us! J. Fitzroy, passenger".
Princess Victoria	United Kingdom	The ship ran aground east of Cape Palos, Spain.

== 12 August ==
List of shipwrecks: 12 August 1850
Ship	State	Description
Albert	United Kingdom	The ship was driven ashore at Saint Domingo.
Eliza Helen	United States	The ship was driven ashore at Saint Domingo.
Favourite	United Kingdom	The sloop capsized at South Shields, County Durham. Her crew were rescued. She was refloated on 14 August.
Margaret and Rachel	United Kingdom	The ship ran aground on the Haisborough Sands, in the North Sea off the coast of Norfolk. She was refloated and resumed her voyage.
Primula	United Kingdom	The barque sprang a leak and foundered off Cape Corrientes, Argentina. Her crew were rescued. She was on a voyage from Cardiff, Glamorgan to Panama.
Sarah and Mary	United Kingdom	The ship was driven ashore and damaged on Chesil Beach, Dorset. She was on a voyage from Bangor, Caernarfonshire to Maldon, Essex.

== 13 August ==
List of shipwrecks: 13 August 1850
Ship	State	Description
Alison	United Kingdom	The ship ran aground on the Patches, off Caldy Island, Pembrokeshire and was damaged. She was on a voyage from Swansea, Glamorgan to Constantinople, Ottoman Empire. She consequently put in to Milford Haven, Pembrokeshire for repairs.
Courier	United Kingdom	The ship was driven ashore at Point Helen, Spain. She was on a voyage from Cardiff, Glamorgan to Galaţi, Ottoman Empire. She became a wreck on 17 August.
Julia	Russia	The ship ran aground on the East Barrow Sand, in the North Sea off the coast of Essex, United Kingdom. She was on a voyage from Kronstadt to Liverpool, Lancashire, United Kingdom. She was refloated the next day and put in to Harwich, Essex in a leaky condition and was placed under repair.
Stephen and Mary	United Kingdom	The ship departed from Hartlepool, County Durham for Aden. No further trace, presumed foundered with the loss of all hands.

== 14 August ==
List of shipwrecks: 14 August 1850
Ship	State	Description
Stephen and Mary	United Kingdom	The ship was sighted off Shoreham-by-Sea, Sussex whilst on a voyage from Hartlepool, County Durham to Aden. No further trace, presumed foundered with the loss of all hands.

== 15 August ==
List of shipwrecks: 15 August 1850
Ship	State	Description
Hazard	United Kingdom	The ship ran aground on the Swinebottoms, in the Baltic Sea. She was on a voyage from Wick, Caithness to Stettin. She was refloated and resumed her voyage.

== 16 August ==
List of shipwrecks: 16 August 1850
Ship	State	Description
Amphion	Sweden	The schooner caught fire and was scuttled at Umeå.
Esperanza	Trieste	The barque was in collision with Thomas (United Kingdom) and foundered 12 nautical miles (22 km) south east of the Tuskar Rock with the loss of six of the fourteen people on board. She was on a voyage from Liverpool, Lancashire, United Kingdom to Trieste.
Hoffnung	Kingdom of Hanover	The ship was driven ashore on Langeoog. She was on a voyage from Norway to Bensersiel.
Johanna Clausina	Netherlands	The ship was driven ashore on Læsø, Denmark. She was on a voyage from Riga, Russia to Rotterdam, South Holland.
Mary	Hamburg	The ship struck a sunken wreck and foundered in the English Channel. Her crew were rescued. She was on a voyage from Newcastle upon Tyne, Northumberland, United Kingdom to Málaga, Spain.
Saville	United Kingdom	The ship struck a sunken rock in the Sound of Islay. She was on a voyage from Sligo to Cardiff, Glamorgan and Marseille, Bouches-du-Rhône. She put in to Cardiff for repairs.
Vier Gebroeders	Kingdom of Hanover	The ship sank off Norderney. She was on a voyage from Oldersum to Carolinensiel.

== 17 August ==
List of shipwrecks: 17 August 1850
Ship	State	Description
Eclipse	(United Kingdom of Great Britain and Ireland) New South Wales	The ketch was wrecked at Newcastle.

== 18 August ==
List of shipwrecks: 18 August 1850
Ship	State	Description
Agnes	United Kingdom	The ship was driven ashore and damaged near Rønne, Denmark. She was on a voyage from Leith, Lothian to Saint Petersburg, Russia. She was refloated on 23 August and taken in to Rønne for repairs.
Integrity	United Kingdom	The brig was driven ashore at Buctouche, New Brunswick, British North America. Although condemned on 11 September, she was subsequently refloated and sailed for Pictou, Nova Scotia, British North America.
Lady Mary	United Kingdom	The brig was driven ashore at Buctouche. Although condemned on 11 September, she was subsequently refloated and sailed for Liverpool, Lancashire.
Neptunus	Rostock	The ship foundered in the North Sea.
Onderneming	Prussia	The ship ran aground on the Inderhaken, in the Baltic Sea. She was on a voyage from Harlingen, Friesland, Netherlands to Memel. She was refloated and beached at Memel.
Vigilant	Uruguay	The schooner was driven ashore and wrecked near Montevideo.

== 19 August ==
List of shipwrecks: 19 August 1850
Ship	State	Description
Assistance	United Kingdom	The ship ran aground off Skagen, Denmark. Her crew were rescued. She was on a voyage from Stettin to London. She became a wreck the next day.
Favourite	United Kingdom	The schooner was driven ashore at Burnt Island, Fife. She was on a voyage from on a voyage from Liverpool, Lancashire to Fisherrow, Lothian. She was later refloated.
Islay	United Kingdom	The paddle steamer was driven ashore on Islay, Inner Hebrides.
James	United Kingdom	The ship was driven ashore at Bowmore, Islay. She was on a voyage from Glasgow, Renfrewshire to Islay. She was refloated on 30 August.
Mandane	United Kingdom	The full-rigged ship was wrecked on Coll, Inner Hebrides with the loss of all hands. She was on a voyage from the Clyde to Demerara, British Guiana.
Mary Welch	United Kingdom	The ship was driven ashore at Cape Spartel, Morocco. She wason a voyage from Newport, Monmouthshire to Livorno, Grand Duchy of Tuscany. She was refloated and taken in to Tangier, Morocco.
Velocity	United Kingdom	The brig was driven ashore north of Truro, Massachusetts, United States. She was on a voyage from Ardrossan, Ayrshire to Boston, Massachusetts. She was refloated on 25 August, completing her voyage on 28 August.
William and Lucy	United Kingdom	The ship was driven ashore at Runton, Norfolk.

== 20 August ==
List of shipwrecks: 20 August 1850
Ship	State	Description
Colonel Coombe	France	The ship ran aground off Anga, Gotland, Sweden. She was on a voyage from Saint Petersburg, Russia to Nantes, Loire-Inférieure. She was refloated and taken in to Slito for repairs.
Fortuna	Duchy of Holstein	The ship foundered in the Dogger Bank. Her crew were rescued.
Frederick VII	Denmark	The ship was driven ashore on Gorgona, Grand Duchy of Tuscany. She was on a voyage from Livorno, Grand Duchy of Tuscany to St. Ubes, Portugal. She was refloated and towed back to Livorno.
Jane	United Kingdom	The ship ran aground off "Varga", Sweden. She was on a voyage from Narva, Russia to Leith. She was refloated and resumed her voyage.
Roberts	United Kingdom	The ship ran aground on the Holm Sand, in the North Sea off the coast of Suffolk. She was on a voyage from Aberdeen to London. She was refloated and taken in to Lowestoft, Suffolk.
William Rushton	United Kingdom	The brig was in collision with the steamship Minerva (United Kingdom) and sank in the Irish Sea off Anglesey with the loss of seven of her eleven crew. Survivors were rescued by Minerva. William Rushton was on a voyage from Laguna, Mexico to Liverpool, Lancashire.

== 21 August ==
List of shipwrecks: 21 August 1850
Ship	State	Description
Amiable Uranie	Belgium	The ship was wrecked on the coast of Vendée, France.
Aro Prindsen	Norway	The ship struck a sunken wreck off the coast of Sweden and was consequently beached at "Sonde". She was on a voyage from "Unica" to Paimbœuf, Loire-Inférieure, France. She had become a wreck by 5 September.
Jane	United Kingdom	The ship ran aground off "Barga". She was on a voyage from Narva, Russia to Leith, Lothian. She was refloated and resumed her voyage.
Jane King	United Kingdom	The barque was wrecked in the Burgher Islands, Newfoundland, British North America. Her crew were rescued. She was on a voyage from Quebec City, Province of Canada, British North America to Cuba.

== 22 August ==
List of shipwrecks: 22 August 1850
Ship	State	Description
Mary Ann	United Kingdom	The ship ran aground near Copenhagen, Denmark. She was on a voyage from Hartlepool, County Durham to Memel, Prussia. She was refloated and put in to Copenhagen in a leaky condition.

== 23 August ==
List of shipwrecks: 23 August 1850
Ship	State	Description
Augusta	Denmark	The ship was driven ashore on Læsø. She was on a voyage from Newcastle upon Tyne, Northumberland, United Kingdom to Copenhagen. She was refloated and taken in to Frederikshavn for repairs.
Fortuna	Belgium	The ship was wrecked by ice off Spitzbergen, Norway. Her crew were rescued.
Gloucester	United Kingdom	The ship was driven ashore in the Startdiep. She was on a voyage from Maassluis, South Holland, Netherlands to Newcastle upon Tyne, Northumberland. She was later refloated and resumed her voyage, but put in to Bridlington, Yorkshire on 29 August.
John Harrison	United Kingdom	The ship capsized off Swinemünde, Prussia with the loss of a crew member. Survivors were rescued by Fidelity (United Kingdom). John Harrison was on a voyage from Swinemünde to London. She was declared a total loss. She was righted on 31 August and taken in to Swinemünde.
Magdalene	United Kingdom	The collier was abandoned in the North Sea. She was on a voyage from Hartlepool, County Durham to London. She was subsequently taken in to Lowestoft, Suffolk in a derelict condition.

== 24 August ==
List of shipwrecks: 24 August 1850
Ship	State	Description
Alphonsine	France	The ship sank at La Barre-de-Monts, Vendée.
Sans Repos	Belgium	The ship ran aground and was damaged in the Bakesund. She was on a voyage from Bergen, Norway to Brussels. She was refloated and put back to Bergen.

== 25 August ==
List of shipwrecks: 25 August 1850
Ship	State	Description
Elinora	United Kingdom	The ship foundered off the mouth of the River Hope with the loss of all but her captain. She was on a voyage from Newcastle upon Tyne, Northumberland to Londonderry.
Heinrich Johanne	Netherlands	The barque was in collision with another barque and foundered with the loss of one life. Two of the survivors were rescued by the steamship Helen McGregor (United Kingdom), the rest by the barque.
Mirma Iliffe	United Kingdom	The ship was driven ashore on Skagen, Denmark. She was on a voyage from Riga, Russia to Hull, Yorkshire.
Runcorn	United Kingdom	The schooner struck the Middle Patch and/or the West Hoyle Bank and foundered off Mostyn, Flintshire.
Samuel Russel	United Kingdom	The ship ran aground and was damaged in the Yangtze downstream of Whampoa, China. She was later refloated and taken in to Hong Kong for repairs.

== 26 August ==
List of shipwrecks: 26 August 1850
Ship	State	Description
Betsey	United Kingdom	The schooner was driven ashore at Dunnet Head, Caithness. She was on a voyage from Liverpool, Lancashire to Wick, Caithness. She was refloated on 7 September.
Duke of Clarence	United Kingdom	The ship struck rocks and foundered off Düne, Heligoland. Her crew were rescued. She was on a voyage from Newcastle upon Tyne, Northumberland to Hamburg.
Ely	United Kingdom	The ship sprang a leak and was beached at the Mumbles, Glamorgan. She was on a voyage from Cardiff, Glamorgan to Liverpool, Lancashire.
Johanna	Kingdom of Hanover	The ship was wrecked on Süderoog, Duchy of Holstein.
Lady Eleanor	United Kingdom	The ship was driven ashore at Peterhead, Aberdeenshire. She was refloated.
Lloyd's	United Kingdom	The ship was wrecked on a reef in the "Tiger Islands" (6°56′N 112°00′E). A boat with six of the crew was reported missing. She was on a voyage from Sydney, New South Wales to Manila, Spanish East Indies.
Margaret Hughes	United Kingdom	The schooner was wrecked on the Middle Patch, in Liverpool Bay with the loss of all hands.
Nimrod	India	The steamship was wrecked at Kathiawar. She was on a voyage from Bombay to Kurrachee.
Rob Roy	United Kingdom	The ship was driven ashore and severely damaged in the Orkney Islands.
Urania	United Kingdom	The ship was abandoned 50 nautical miles (93 km) west north west of the Horns Reef.

== 27 August ==
List of shipwrecks: 27 August 1850
Ship	State	Description
Bacchus	United Kingdom	The schooner sank at Dungeness, Kent. Her crew were rescued. She was on a voyage from Newcastle upon Tyne, Northumberland to Southampton, Hampshire.
Blossom	United Kingdom	The ship ran aground on the Holm Sand, in the North Sea off the coast of Suffolk. She was refloated.
Gezina	Danzig	The ship sank off Rörö, Sweden. She was on a voyage from Leith, Lothian, United Kingdom to Danzig. She was refloated on 31 August.
Jantine Catharina	Sweden	The ship was driven ashore near Varberg, Sweden. Her crew were rescued. She was on a voyage from Hartlepool, County Durham to Malmö, Sweden.
Maria and John	United Kingdom	The ship was driven ashore near Varberg. Her crew were rescued. she was on a voyage from Sunderland, County Durham to Memel, Prussia.
Minnet	Lübeck	The ship ran aground on the Wardogadder. She was on a voyage from Lübeck to Gamla Carleby, Sweden.
Sally	United Kingdom	The ship ran aground on the Felsand Reef, off Saaremaa, Russia and was abandoned the next day. Her crew were rescued. She was on a voyage from Dundee, Forfarshire to Saint Petersburg, Russia.

== 28 August ==
List of shipwrecks: 28 August 1850
Ship	State	Description
Achilles	United States	The ship was driven ashore near Halmstad, Sweden. She was on a voyage from New York to Gothenburg and Stockholm, Sweden.
Doris	Rostock	The ship was driven ashore near Helsingør, Denmark. She was on a voyage from Havre de Grâce, Seine-Inférieure, France to Rostock.
Faedreneslandes	Norway	The ship was driven ashore and wrecked at Kälen, Sweden. Her crew were rescued. She was on a voyage from London, United Kingdom to Sundsvall, Sweden.
Gesina	Danzig	The koff sank near Rörö, Sweden with the loss of all but her captain. She was on a voyage from Leith, Lothian, United Kingdom to Danzig. She was refloated on 31 August.
Jessie	United Kingdom	The brig capsized off Anholt, Denmark. all nine people on board were rescued by the schooner James (United Kingdom). Jessie came ashore on the Swedish coast on 6 September. She was broken up to salvage her cargo.
Stranger	United Kingdom	The ship was driven ashore near Swinemünde, Prussia.

== 29 August ==
List of shipwrecks: 29 August 1850
Ship	State	Description
Hendrika Johanna	Flag unknown	The derelict schooner was driven onto the Paternoster Reef, off the coast of Sweden.
John	(United Kingdom of Great Britain and Ireland) Guernsey	The schooner ran aground on the Foreness Rock, Margate, Kent. She was on a voyage from Guernsey to London. She was refloated the next day and put in to Ramsgate, Kent in a leaky condition. She was refloated on 1 September and taken in to Ramsgate, Kent in a leaky condition.
Margaret	United Kingdom	The sloop was wrecked on the Quiltan Rocks, off Jura, Inner Hebrides. Her crew were rescued.
Rhoda	United Kingdom	The ship was abandoned in the North Sea 85 nautical miles (157 km) east by south of Tynemouth, Northumberland. Her eight crew were rescued by the fishing smack Jacob de Febre de Montague (Netherlands). Rhoda was on a voyage from Sunderland, County Durham to Memel, Prussia. She was taken in to Hellevoetsluis, Zeeland, Netherlands on 6 September.

== 30 August ==
List of shipwrecks: 30 August 1850
Ship	State	Description
Aqua Marina	United Kingdom	The ship ran aground on a reef in the Gaspar Strait. She was abandoned and set afire. She was on a voyage from Whampoa, China to London.
Juno	Prussia	The ship was driven ashore at Båstad, Sweden. She had become a wreck by 7 September.
Marie Louise	France	The ship was wrecked on Anholt, Denmark. She was on a voyage from Dunkirk, Nord to Saint Petersburg, Russia.
Northumbria	United Kingdom	The ship was driven ashore on Apple Island and sank. Her crew were rescued. She was on a voyage from Bristol, Gloucestershire to Quebec City, Province of Canada, British North America.
Paquetten	Duchy of Holstein	The sloop ran aground and sank at Hals, Denmark.

== 31 August ==
List of shipwrecks: 31 August 1850
Ship	State	Description
Courrier de Marseille	France	The ship was driven ashore at Abbeville, Somme. She was on a voyage from Nantes, Loire-Inférieure to Abbeville.
Joachim Henry	Russia	The ship foundered off Seskar, Grand Duchy of Finland. Her crew were rescued.
Karen Andrea	Denmark	The ship was abandoned south of Anholt. She was on a voyage from Newcastle upon Tyne, Northumberland, United Kingdom to Malmö, Sweden.
Olive	France	The ship foundered in the Raz de Sein. Her crew were rescued. She was on a voyage from Blyth, Northumberland to Bordeaux, Gironde.

== Unknown date ==
List of shipwrecks: Unknown date in August 1850
Ship	State	Description
Adrona	United Kingdom	The schooner was driven ashore and sank at Key West, Florida, United States.
Breeze	United Kingdom	The brig was wrecked in the Magdalen Islands, Nova Scotia, British North America before 16 August. She was on a voyage from Saguenay, Province of Canada, British North America to London.
Carl Johan	Flag unknown	The ship was wrecked on the coast of Scotland. Her crew were rescued.
Columbine	United Kingdom	The ship was driven ashore near Sesimbra, Portugal before 14 August. She was on a voyage from Cádiz, Spain to London. She was refloated and taken in to St. Ubes, Portugal. She was consequently condemned.
Coronilla	United Kingdom	The ship was driven ashore at the mouth of St. Mary's River. She was refloated on 5 August and taken in to Halifax, Nova Scotia.
Eliza	United Kingdom	The ship foundered in the North Sea. Her crew were rescued. She was on a voyage from Arkhangelsk, Russia to Hull, Yorkshire.
Enchantress	(United Kingdom of Great Britain and Ireland) New South Wales	The schooner was wrecked in the Torres Straits. All on board were rescued. She was on a voyage from Sydney to Java, Netherlands East Indies.
Favourite	United Kingdom	The ship foundered in the Atlantic Ocean 130 nautical miles (240 km) off Bahia, Brazil before 16 August. Her crew were rescued. She was on a voyage from London to Suez, Egypt.
Hierra	Lübeck	The ship was wrecked in the Orinoco River before 22 August. Her crew were rescued.
Lammenais, and Nouveau Provençal	France	The brig Lammenais was driven into the barque Nouveau Provençal and was then driven ashore at Buenos Aires, Argentina before 3 August. She was consequently condemned. Nouveau Provençal was also driven ashore and was also condemned.
Maren Johanna	Norway	The ship was wrecked off Spitzbergen before 9 August. Her crew were rescued.
Mercurius	United Kingdom	The ship was driven ashore at Buenos Aires before 3 August.
Orus	United States	The steamship ran aground in the Colorado River before 22 August.
Peggy	United Kingdom	The ship was driven ashore and wrecked in Loch Eribol in late August. She was on a voyage from Arkhangelsk to Liverpool, Lancashire.
Perseverance	United Kingdom	The ship was driven ashore on Prince Edward Island, British North America. She was on a voyage from Bathurst, New Brunswick, British North America to an American port. She was refloated and taken in to the Gut of Canso for repairs.
Prins Carl	United Kingdom	The ship was wrecked off Spitzbergen before 9 August. Her crew were rescued.
Prunella	United Kingdom	The ship was wrecked at Montevideo, Uruguay. Her crew were rescued.
Sir Robert Peel	United Kingdom	The ship foundered in the Atlantic Ocean 200 nautical miles (370 km) off São Vicente, Cape Verde Islands.
Sovereign	United Kingdom	The brig foundered in the Atlantic Ocean. Her crew were rescued.
Victory	United Kingdom	The ship ran aground on the Lonsdale Reef. She was refloated and put in to Port Phillip, Victoria, where she arrived on 17 August.
