= Mokradła =

- Hamlet
- Location within Poland
- Coordinates: 53°59′03″N 14°55′20″E
- Country: Poland
- Voivodeship: West Pomeranian
- County: Kamień
- Municipality: Świerzno
- Time zone: UTC+1 (CET)
  - Summer (DST): UTC+2 (CEST)
- Postal code: 72-405
- Area code: +48 91
- Car plates: ZKA

Mokradła (Polish: [mɔˈkra.dwa], lit. 'the Wetlands') is a hamlet (colony) in the West Pomeranian Voivodeship, Poland, located within the municipality of Świerzno in Kamień County.
