= Jatki, West Pomeranian Voivodeship =

Jatki
- Village
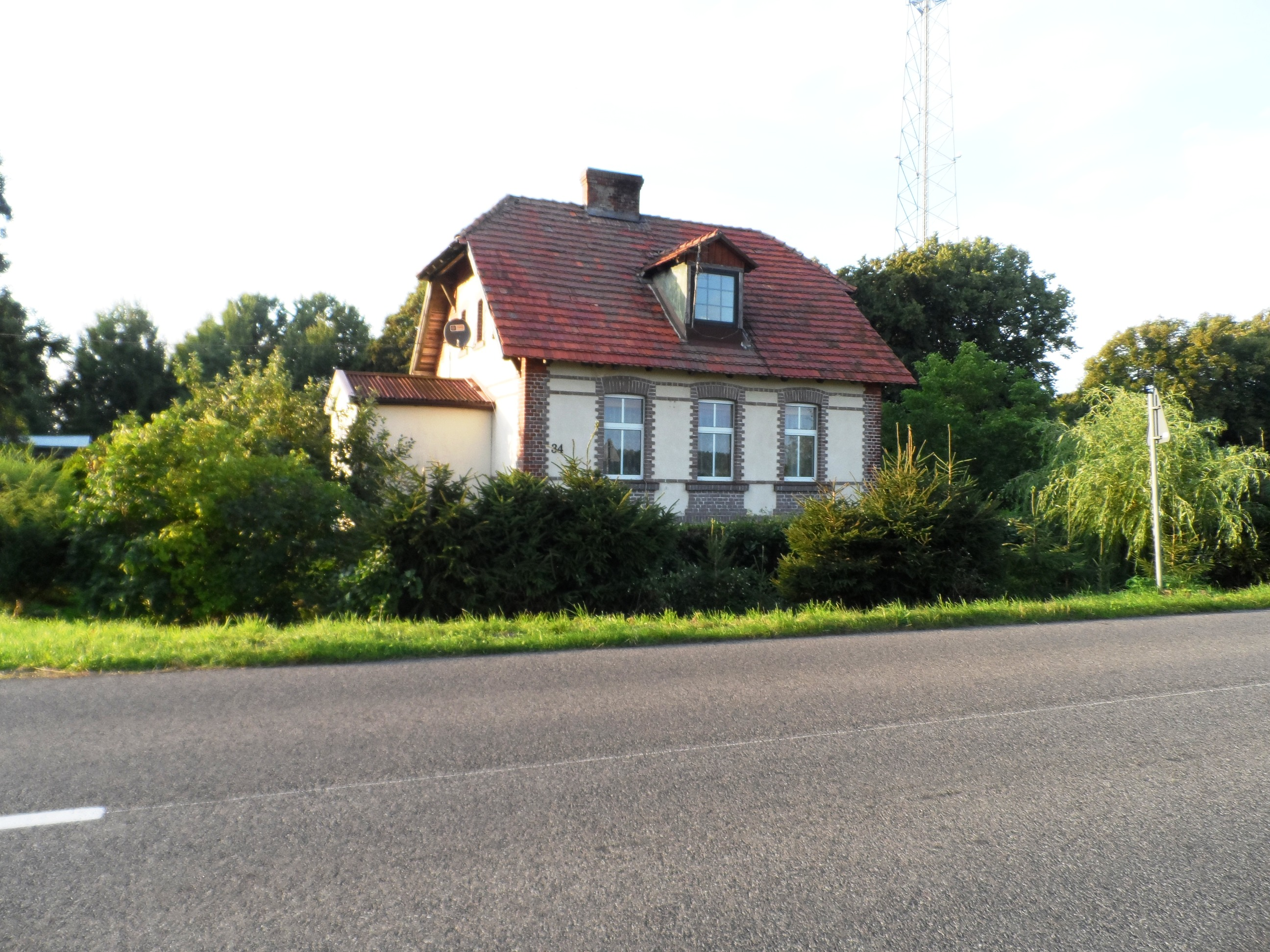

- Location within Poland
- Coordinates: 53°57′51″N 14°54′35″E
- Country: Poland
- Voivodeship: West Pomeranian
- County: Kamień
- Gmina: Świerzno

Population (approx.)
  - Total: 150
- Time zone: UTC+1 (CET)
  - Summer (DST): UTC+2 (CEST)
- Vehicle registration: ZKA
- Website: http://jatki.eu

Jatki [ˈjatki] (German: Brendemühl) is a village in the administrative district of Gmina Świerzno, within Kamień County, West Pomeranian Voivodeship, in north-western Poland. It lies approximately 4 km (2 mi) west of Świerzno, 9 km (6 mi) east of Kamień Pomorski, and 65 km (40 mi) north of the regional capital Szczecin.

The village has an approximate population of 150.

== History ==
In the 12th century, the area became part of the early Polish state under the Piast dynasty, before gradually coming under the influence of the Holy Roman Empire and Brandenburg. It remained under German states until 1945, when, following World War II and the Potsdam Agreement, the region was returned to Poland. During World War II, the German administration operated a forced labour subcamp of the Stalag II-D prisoner-of-war camp in the village.
