= Gostyniec, West Pomeranian Voivodeship =

Gostyniec
- Village
- Location within Poland
- Coordinates: 53°59′40″N 14°58′6″E
- Country: Poland
- Voivodeship: West Pomeranian
- County: Kamień
- Gmina: Świerzno
- Population: 165

Gostyniec ( [ɡɔsˈtɨɲɛt͡s]; German: Klein Justin) is a village in the administrative district of Gmina Świerzno, within Kamień County, West Pomeranian Voivodeship, in north-western Poland. It lies approximately 4 km (2 mi) north of Świerzno, 13 km (8 mi) east of Kamień Pomorski, and 69 km (43 mi) north of the regional capital Szczecin.

The village has a population of 165.
