= Ciesław, West Pomeranian Voivodeship =

Ciesław
- Village
- Location within Poland
- Coordinates: 53°55′5″N 15°0′29″E
- Country: Poland
- Voivodeship: West Pomeranian
- County: Kamień
- Gmina: Świerzno
- Population: 241

Ciesław [ˈt͡ɕɛswaf] (German: Tetzlaffshagen) is a village in the administrative district of Gmina Świerzno, within Kamień County, West Pomeranian Voivodeship, in north-western Poland. It lies approximately 6 km (4 mi) south-east of Świerzno, 16 km (10 mi) east of Kamień Pomorski, and 63 km (39 mi) north-east of the regional capital Szczecin.

The village has a population of 241.
