= Gostyń, West Pomeranian Voivodeship =

Gostyń
- Village
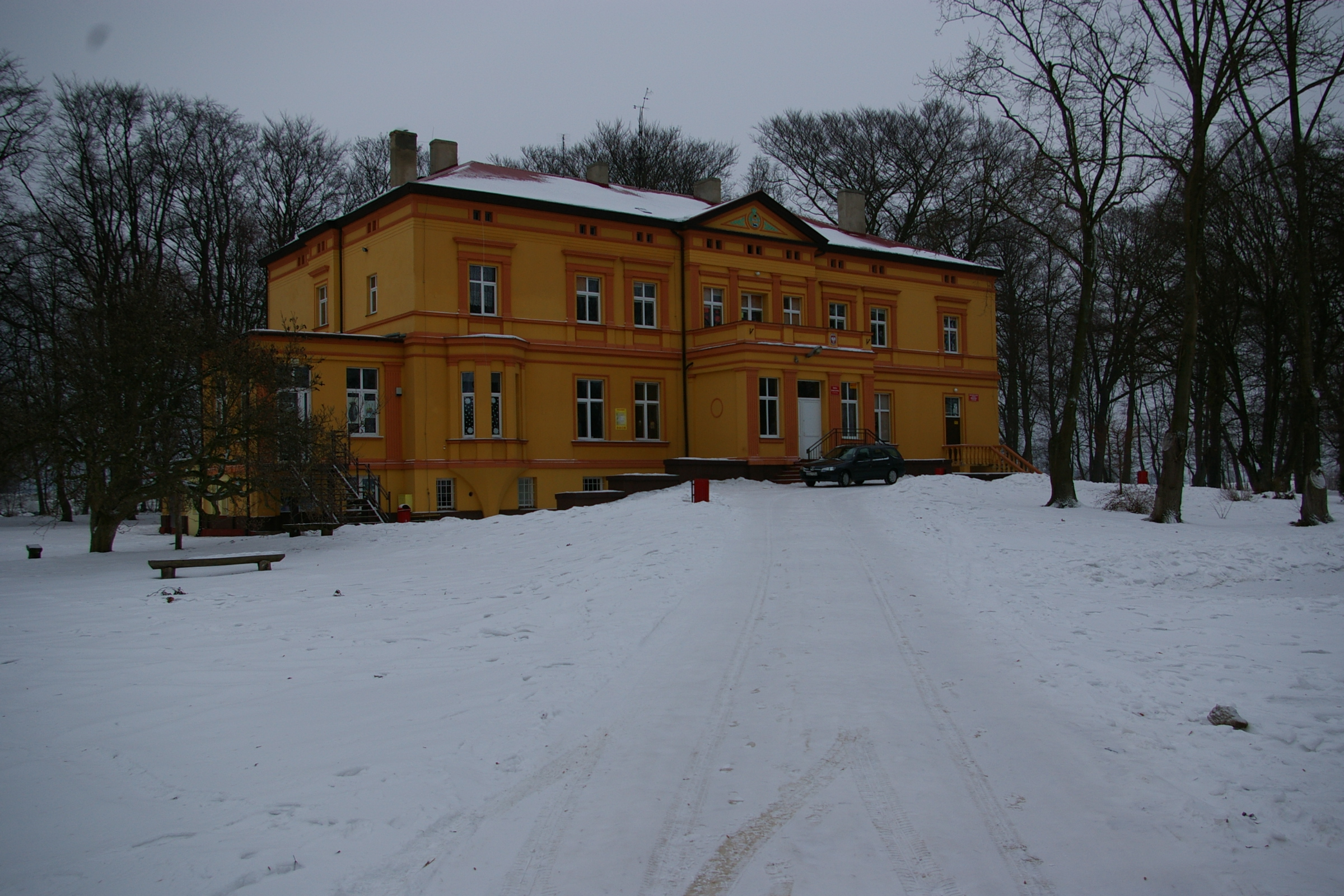
- Gostyń Palace

- Location within Poland
- Coordinates: 54°1′49″N 14°57′2″E
- Country: Poland
- Voivodeship: West Pomeranian
- County: Kamień
- Gmina: Świerzno

Population
  - Total: 660
- Time zone: UTC+1 (CET)
  - Summer (DST): UTC+2 (CEST)
- Vehicle registration: ZKA

Gostyń [ˈɡɔstɨɲ] is a village in the administrative district of Gmina Świerzno, within Kamień County, West Pomeranian Voivodeship, in north-western Poland. It lies approximately 8 km (5 mi) north of Świerzno, 13 km (8 mi) north-east of Kamień Pomorski, and 73 km (45 mi) north of the regional capital Szczecin.

The village has a population of 660.

It is located in the historic region of Pomerania.
