= Starza =

- Village
- Location within Poland
- Coordinates: 53°56′56″N 15°2′15″E
- Country: Poland
- Voivodeship: West Pomeranian
- County: Kamień
- Gmina: Świerzno
- Population: 179

Starza [ˈstaʐa] (German: Staarz) is a village in the administrative district of Gmina Świerzno, within Kamień County, West Pomeranian Voivodeship, in north-western Poland. It lies approximately 6 km (4 mi) east of Świerzno, 17 km (11 mi) east of Kamień Pomorski, and 67 km (42 mi) north-east of the regional capital Szczecin.

== See also ==
- History of Pomerania
