= Ugory, West Pomeranian Voivodeship =

Ugory
- Village
- Location within Poland
- Coordinates: 53°58′44″N 14°57′2″E
- Country: Poland
- Voivodeship: West Pomeranian
- County: Kamień
- Gmina: Świerzno

Ugory [uˈɡɔrɨ] (German: Friedensfelde) is a village in the administrative district of Gmina Świerzno, within Kamień County, West Pomeranian Voivodeship, in north-western Poland. It lies approximately 2 km (1 mi) north-west of Świerzno, 11 km (7 mi) east of Kamień Pomorski, and 67 km (42 mi) north of the regional capital Szczecin.

Before 1637 the area was part of Duchy of Pomerania. For the history of the region, see History of Pomerania.
