= Stuchowo =

- Village
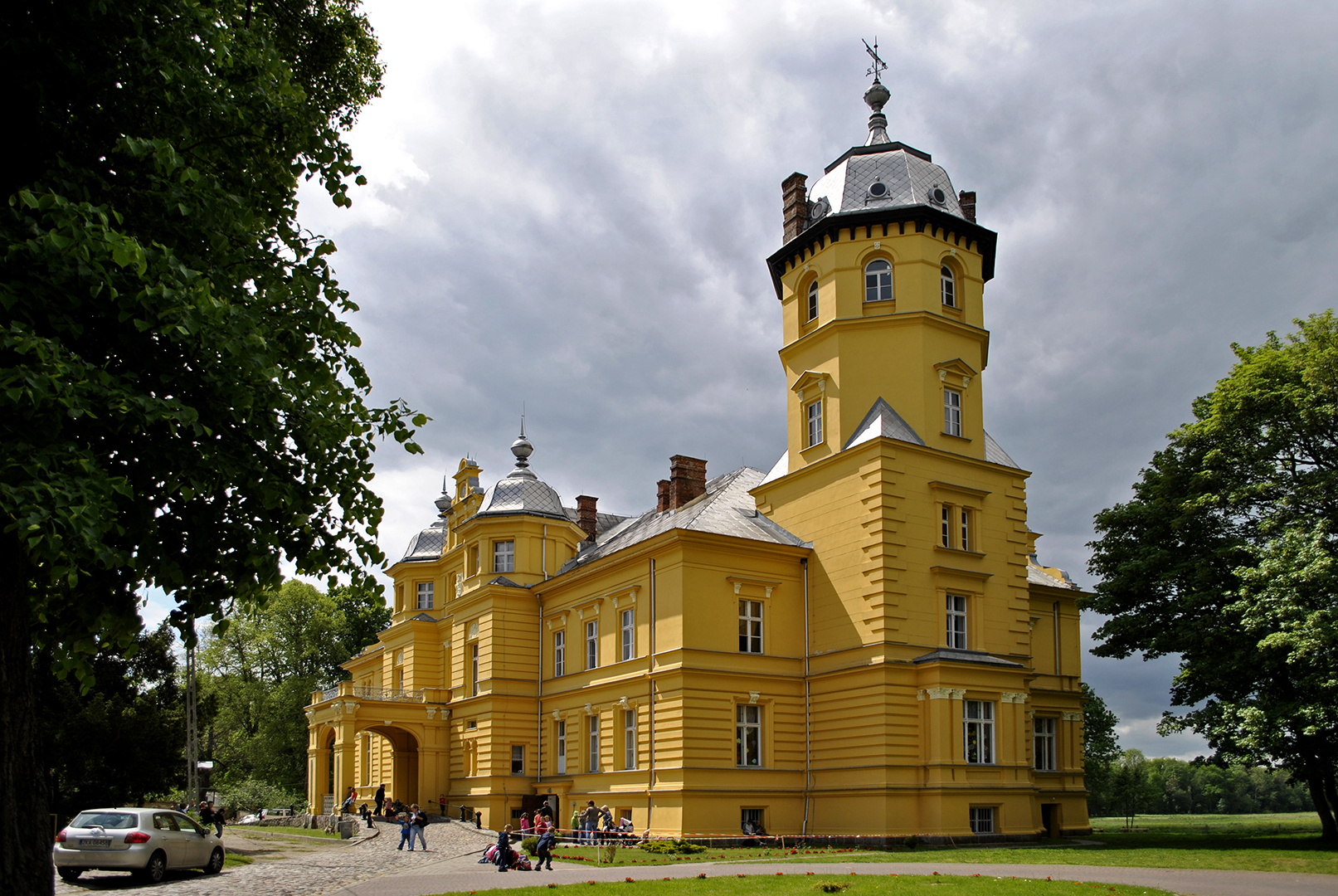
- Stuchowo Palace

- Location within Poland
- Coordinates: 53°56′56″N 15°0′39″E
- Country: Poland
- Voivodeship: West Pomeranian
- County: Kamień
- Gmina: Świerzno
- Time zone: UTC+1 (CET)
  - Summer (DST): UTC+2 (CEST)
- Vehicle registration: ZKA

Stuchowo [stuˈxɔvɔ] is a village in the administrative district of Gmina Świerzno, within Kamień County, West Pomeranian Voivodeship, in north-western Poland. It lies approximately 4 km (2 mi) south-east of Świerzno, 15 km (9 mi) east of Kamień Pomorski, and 66 km (41 mi) north-east of the regional capital Szczecin.
