= Grebice =

Grebice may refer to:

- Grębice, a village in Poland
- Grebice, Nikšić, a village near Nikšić, Montenegro
