= Będzieszewo =

- Village
- Location within Poland
- Coordinates: 53°56′31″N 14°56′47″E
- Country: Poland
- Voivodeship: West Pomeranian
- County: Kamień
- Gmina: Świerzno

Będzieszewo [bɛnd͡ʑɛˈʂɛvɔ] (German: Bandesow) is a village in the administrative district of Gmina Świerzno, within Kamień County, West Pomeranian Voivodeship, in north-western Poland. It lies approximately 3 km (2 mi) south-west of Świerzno, 11 km (7 mi) east of Kamień Pomorski, and 64 km (40 mi) north of the regional capital Szczecin.

== See also ==
- History of Pomerania
