= Margowo =

- Village
- Location within Poland
- Coordinates: 53°56′N 14°53′E
- Country: Poland
- Voivodeship: West Pomeranian
- County: Kamień
- Gmina: Świerzno

Margowo [marˈɡɔvɔ] (German: Morgow) is a village in the administrative district of Gmina Świerzno, within Kamień County, West Pomeranian Voivodeship, in north-western Poland. It lies approximately 7 km (4 mi) south-west of Świerzno, 8 km (5 mi) south-east of Kamień Pomorski, and 61 km (38 mi) north of the regional capital Szczecin.

For the history of the region, see History of Pomerania.
