= Kępica =

- Village
- Location within Poland
- Coordinates: 53°56′N 14°59′E
- Country: Poland
- Voivodeship: West Pomeranian
- County: Kamień
- Gmina: Świerzno

Kępica [kɛmˈpit͡sa] (German: Kambz) is a village in the administrative district of Gmina Świerzno, within Kamień County, West Pomeranian Voivodeship, in north-western Poland. It lies approximately 4 km (2 mi) south of Świerzno, 14 km (9 mi) east of Kamień Pomorski, and 64 km (40 mi) north-east of the regional capital Szczecin.

Before 1637 the area was part of Duchy of Pomerania. For the history of the region, see History of Pomerania.
