= Duniewo =

- Village
- Location within Poland
- Coordinates: 53°54′N 14°57′E
- Country: Poland
- Voivodeship: West Pomeranian
- County: Kamień
- Gmina: Świerzno

Duniewo [duˈɲɛvɔ] (German: Dünow) is a village in the administrative district of Gmina Świerzno, within Kamień County, West Pomeranian Voivodeship, in north-western Poland. It lies approximately 8 km (5 mi) south of Świerzno, 14 km (9 mi) south-east of Kamień Pomorski, and 59 km (37 mi) north-east of the regional capital Szczecin.

Before 1637 the area was part of Duchy of Pomerania. For the history of the region, see History of Pomerania.
