= Osiecze =

- Village
- Location within Poland
- Coordinates: 53°55′5″N 14°57′1″E
- Country: Poland
- Voivodeship: West Pomeranian
- County: Kamień
- Gmina: Świerzno

Osiecze [ɔˈɕɛt͡ʂɛ] (German: Neuhöfe) is a village in the administrative district of Gmina Świerzno, within Kamień County, West Pomeranian Voivodeship, in north-western Poland. It lies approximately 6 km (4 mi) south of Świerzno, 13 km (8 mi) south-east of Kamień Pomorski, and 61 km (38 mi) north-east of the regional capital Szczecin.

For the history of the region, see History of Pomerania.
