= Dąbrowa, Kamień County =

Dąbrowa
- Village
- Location within Poland
- Coordinates: 54°00′18″N 14°56′38″E
- Country: Poland
- Voivodeship: West Pomeranian
- County: Kamień
- Gmina: Świerzno
- Population (2021): 34

Dąbrowa [dɔmˈbrɔva] (German Damerow) is a village in the administrative district of Gmina Świerzno, within Kamień County, West Pomeranian Voivodeship, in north-western Poland.

For the history of the region, see History of Pomerania.
