= Redliny =

- Village
- Location within Poland
- Coordinates: 53°59′33″N 14°56′58″E
- Country: Poland
- Voivodeship: West Pomeranian
- County: Kamień
- Gmina: Świerzno

Redliny [rɛˈdlinɨ] (German: Aschersruhe; 1936–45: Redlinsfelde) is a village in the administrative district of Gmina Świerzno, within Kamień County, West Pomeranian Voivodeship, in north-western Poland.

For the history of the region, see History of Pomerania.
