= HMS Dwarf (1843) =

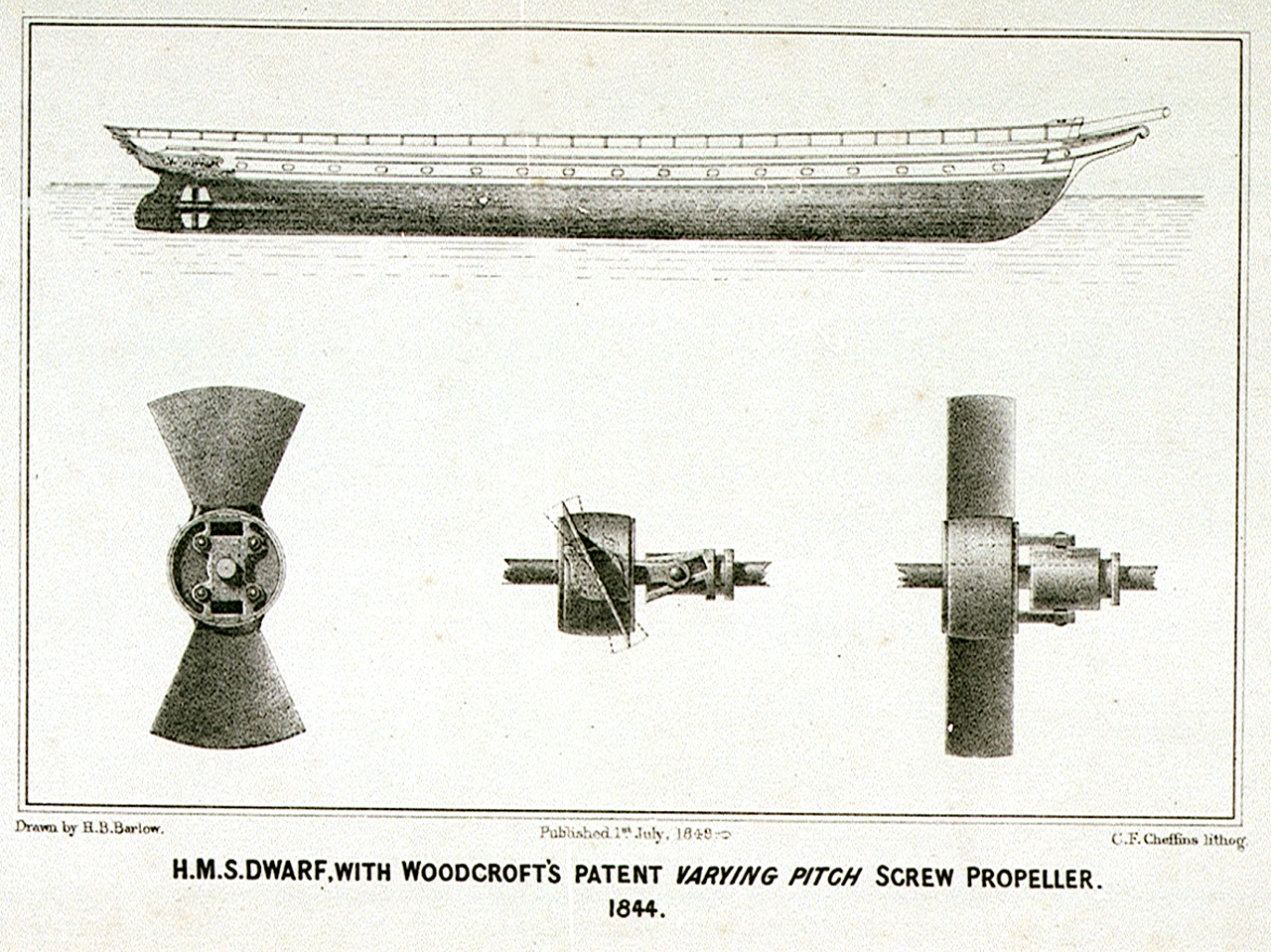
HMS Dwarf. A diagrammatic view of her hull and Woodcroft's Patent Varying Pitch Screw Propeller of 1844.

HMS Dwarf was launched in 1840 as the mercantile Mermaid. The Royal Navy purchased her in 1843 as the Navy's first screw-propelled vessel. She was broken up in 1853.

== Mermaid ==
Mermaid was an iron vessel built at Blackwall for mercantile use. She was fitted with Bennet Woodcroft's patent varying pitch screw propeller.

She was of 164 tons, and her mean draught on her trial trip was only 5 1/2 feet (1.7 m).

== HMS Dwarf ==
The British Admiralty purchased Mermaid from J. and G. Rennie, Holland Street, Blackfriars, on 22 June 1843, according to Sir George Cockburn's advice, and on the condition that she should steam 12 miles per hour (19 km/h) (7 March 1842). The Navy renamed her HMS Dwarf.

Dwarf underwent trials on 15 May 1843. Over six runs she achieved a mean speed of 12.142 miles. The results of her extensive propeller trials were published in December 1844.

Dwarf went on to serve as a tender to HMY Victoria and Albert (1843), she was under the command of Lieutenant Commander Edward Halhead Beauchamp-Proctor until March 1843, when the vessel was paid off at Woolwich.

Prince Albert while on board HMY Victoria and Albert at Cowes in October 1844 professed interest in the little screw and came on board with Queen Victoria for a closer look.

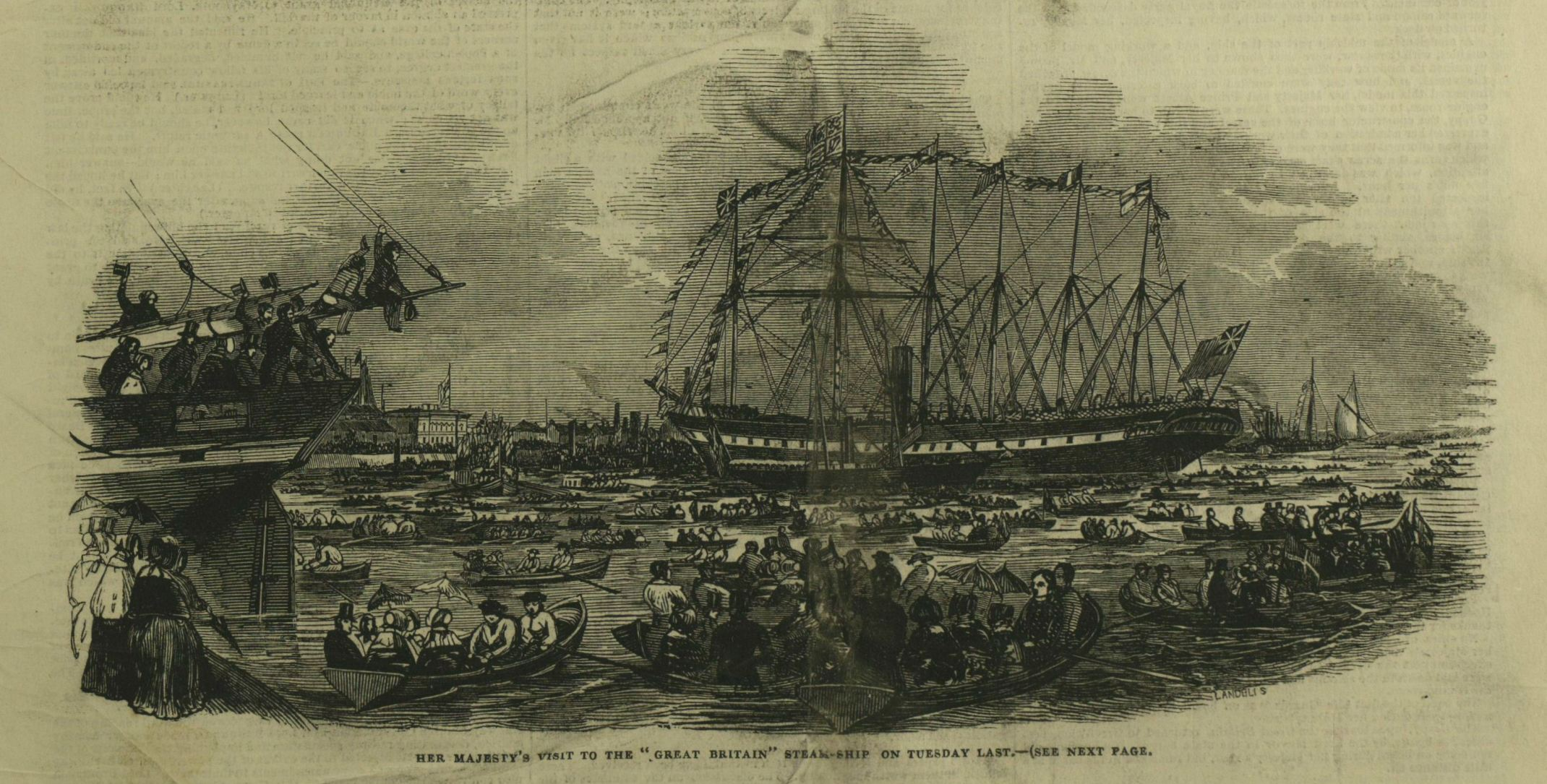
Her Majesty on board the Dwarf visits the SS Great Britain at Blackwall on 22 April 1845

In December 1845, Dwarf was sent to Sheerness to take on the duties of that port's admirals' tender.

Lieutenant Osborne, when in command of Dwarf on the coast of Ireland in 1848, fitting out in the Portsmouth Basin, heard the cry of "a boy overboard," he immediately plunged in with his full uniform on, including his sword, and saved the boy. A first-class certificate was awarded, and he was strongly recommended to the Parent Society in London.

Dwarf, while moored in Kingstown Harbour, Ireland, sent an armed boat crew to Ann Kenney and captured an unrecognised emerald silk flag.

On 26 September 1849, she was run down by and collided with HMS Trident in the Atlantic Ocean 60 nautical miles (110 km) southeast of the Old Head of Kinsale, County Cork. Dwarf was severely damaged. Her crew were taken off by Trident, which towed her into Kinsale, County Cork for repairs.

== Fate ==
Dwarf was scrapped in 1853.

The second screw vessel in the Royal Navy was HMS Bee a paddle vessel, built of wood and launched in 1842 as a tender to the Royal Academy, Portsmouth. Bee had additional screw propulsion fitted in 1844. She was broken up in 1874. Both vessels were purely experimental and never intended for active service.
