= Krzemykowo =

- Village
- Location within Poland
- Coordinates: 53°53′39″N 14°57′09″E
- Country: Poland
- Voivodeship: West Pomeranian
- County: Kamień
- Gmina: Świerzno

Krzemykowo [kʂɛmɨˈkɔvɔ] (German: Klaushagen) is a village in the administrative district of Gmina Świerzno, within Kamień County, West Pomeranian Voivodeship, in north-western Poland.

Before 1637 the area was part of Duchy of Pomerania. For the history of the region, see History of Pomerania.
