= Kaleń, West Pomeranian Voivodeship =

Kaleń
- Village
- Location within Poland
- Coordinates: 53°58′43″N 15°0′37″E
- Country: Poland
- Voivodeship: West Pomeranian
- County: Kamień
- Gmina: Świerzno

Kaleń [ˈkalɛɲ] (German: Kahlen) is a village in the administrative district of Gmina Świerzno, within Kamień County, West Pomeranian Voivodeship, in north-western Poland. It lies approximately 4 km (2 mi) north-east of Świerzno, 15 km (9 mi) east of Kamień Pomorski, and 69 km (43 mi) north-east of the regional capital Szczecin.

For the history of the region, see History of Pomerania.
