= HMS Trident (1845) =

Sloop of the Royal Navy

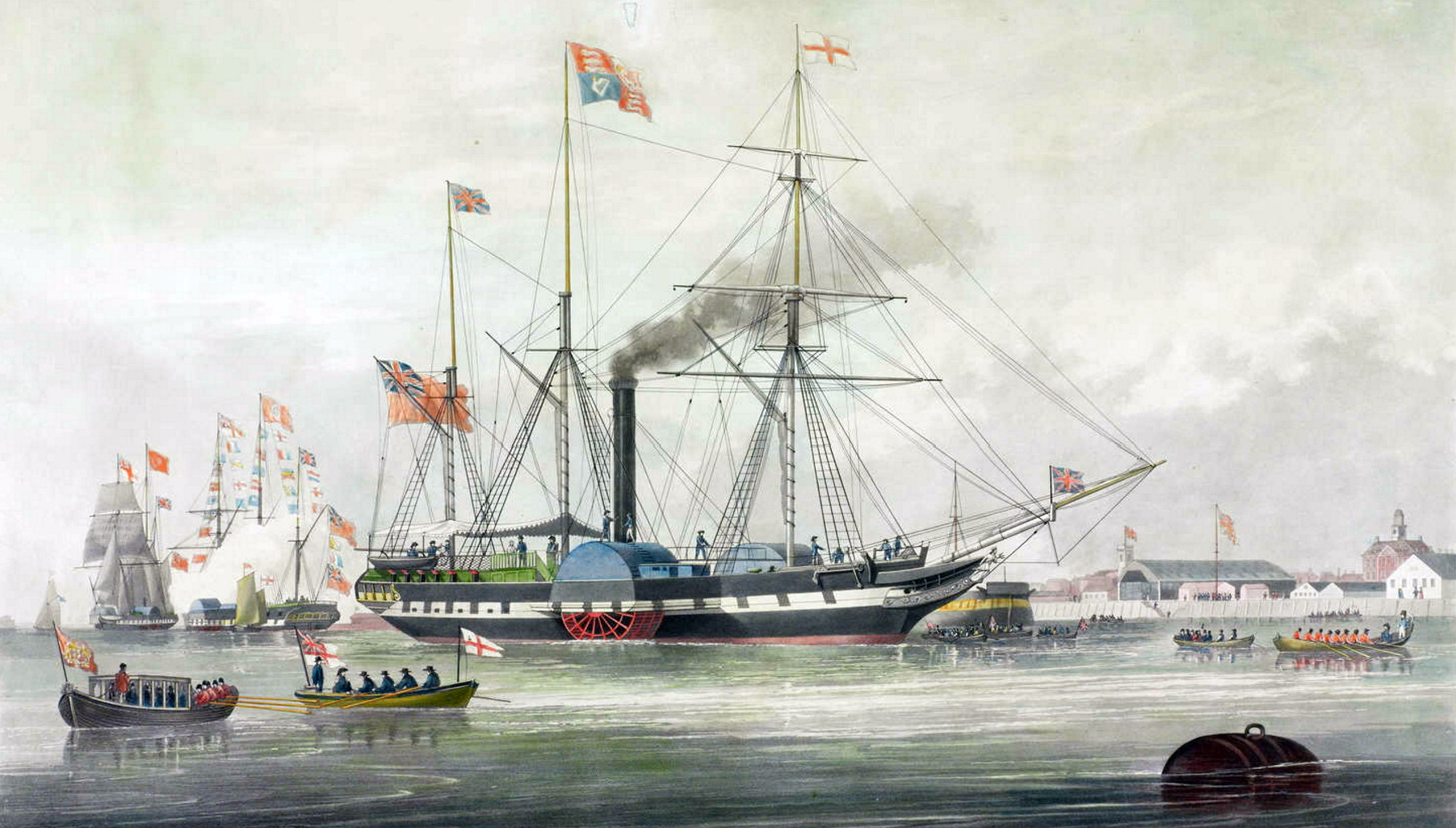

History

United Kingdom
- Name: HMS Trident
- Ordered: 13 April 1843
- Builder: Ditchburn & Mare, Leamouth
- Cost: c. £41,366 (Note: A total cost accounting for inflation of approximately £4,348,700 in today's money.)
- Laid down: 1845
- Launched: 16 December 1845
- Commissioned: 8 August 1846
- Fate: Broken up by Castle at Charlton January 1866

General characteristics
- Type: Third-class iron paddle sloop
- Displacement: 903 tons
- Tons burthen: 850 26/94 bm
- Length: 180 ft (55 m) (gundeck); 161 ft 1 in (49.1 m) (keel)
- Beam: 31 ft 6 in (9.6 m)
- Draught: 10 ft 9 in (3.3 m)
- Depth of hold: 17 ft 3 in (5.3 m)
- Installed power: 350 nhp
- Propulsion: Boulton, Watt & Co two-cylinder oscillating steam engine; Side paddles
- Speed: 9.5 knots (17.6 km/h) under steam
- Complement: 135
- Armament: 2 × 10-inch (85 cwt) guns; 2 (later 4) × 32-pounder gunnades

HMS Trident was an iron paddle sloop built for the Royal Navy by Ditchburn & Mare in 1845 at Leamouth, London. She served in the Mediterranean, off West Africa and in the South Atlantic, and was broken up in 1866.

== Design and construction ==
Trident's design was commissioned on 2 August 1842 for a steam yacht to replace HMS Black Eagle (previously Firebrand). She was a third class iron paddle sloop, the only ship ever built to her design. The builder's design was approved on 22 August 1843 and she was launched on 16 December 1845. Her hull cost £17,000, and her machinery another £17,502. Fitting out was estimated to have cost a further £6,864.

=== Propulsion ===
She was originally intended to be fitted with a Maudslay side lever engine of 200 nominal horsepower, but received a Boulton, Watt & Co. two-cylinder oscillating steam engine with 70 3/4-inch (180 cm) diameter cylinders and 5-foot (1.5 m) stroke. The engine was rated at 350 nominal horsepower and propelled her at a maximum speed of 9.5 knots (17.6 km/h) through a pair of paddle wheels.

=== Armament ===
Trident received a pair of 10-inch (85 cwt) guns and two (later four) 32-pounder gunnades. (Note: "cwt", or "hundredweight" refers to the weight of the gun itself. "32-pounder" refers to the weight of the ball fired.)

== Service ==
HMS Trident commissioned for the first time on 8 August 1846 for the Mediterranean. On 26 September 1849, she collided with HMS Dwarf in the Atlantic Ocean 60 nautical miles (110 km) south east of the Old Head of Kinsale, County Cork. HMS Dwarf was severely damaged. Her crew were taken off by HMS Trident, which towed her in to Kinsale, County Cork. Between 1852 and 1861 she served on the South America Station and in the West Africa Squadron. On 11 December 1861 her commanding officer, Commander Beville Nicolas, was dismissed the service for cruelty after excessively punishing two boys for leave breaking at Gibraltar. She paid off at Woolwich on 20 December 1864.

== Fate ==
Trident was broken up by Castle at Charlton in January 1866.

== Memorial ==
There is a memorial in Southsea Portsmouth UK, for the 44 officers and men who died of yellow fever in Sierra Leone in 1859.
