= Kaleń =

Kaleń may refer to the following places:

- Kaleń, Piotrków County in Łódź Voivodeship (central Poland)
- Kaleń, Radomsko County in Łódź Voivodeship (central Poland)
- Kaleń, Gmina Rawa Mazowiecka in Łódź Voivodeship (central Poland)
- Kaleń, Gmina Sadkowice in Łódź Voivodeship (central Poland)
- Kaleń, Lublin Voivodeship (east Poland)
- Kaleń, Gostynin County in Masovian Voivodeship (east-central Poland)
- Kaleń, Gmina Żabia Wola, Grodzisk County in Masovian Voivodeship (east-central Poland)
- Kaleń, Przysucha County in Masovian Voivodeship (east-central Poland)
- Kaleń, West Pomeranian Voivodeship (north-west Poland)
