= Grębice =

- Village
- Location within Poland
- Coordinates: 53°58′42″N 15°1′35″E
- Country: Poland
- Voivodeship: West Pomeranian
- County: Kamień
- Gmina: Świerzno

Grębice [ɡrɛmˈbit͡sɛ] (German: Johannisberg) is a village in the administrative district of Gmina Świerzno, within Kamień County, West Pomeranian Voivodeship, in north-western Poland. It lies approximately 5 km (3 mi) east of Świerzno, 16 km (10 mi) east of Kamień Pomorski, and 69 km (43 mi) north-east of the regional capital Szczecin.

Before 1637 the area was part of Duchy of Pomerania. For the history of the region, see History of Pomerania.
