= Trzebieradz =

- Village
- Location within Poland
- Coordinates: 54°01′12″N 14°57′39″E
- Country: Poland
- Voivodeship: West Pomeranian
- County: Kamień
- Gmina: Świerzno

Trzebieradz [tʂɛˈbjɛrat͡s] (German: Knurrbusch) is a village in the administrative district of Gmina Świerzno, within Kamień County, West Pomeranian Voivodeship, in north-western Poland.

Before 1637 the area was part of Duchy of Pomerania. For the history of the region, see History of Pomerania.
