= Rybice =

- Village
- Location within Poland
- Coordinates: 54°01′47″N 14°54′59″E
- Country: Poland
- Voivodeship: West Pomeranian
- County: Kamień
- Gmina: Świerzno

Rybice [rɨˈbit͡sɛ] (German: Riebitz) is a village in the administrative district of Gmina Świerzno, within Kamień County, West Pomeranian Voivodeship, in north-western Poland.

For the history of the region, see History of Pomerania.
