= Gmina Świerzno =

Gmina Świerzno Świerzno Commune
- Gmina
- Coat of arms
- Interactive map of Gmina Świerzno
- Coordinates (Świerzno): 53°57′53″N 14°57′56″E
- Country: Poland
- Voivodeship: West Pomeranian
- County: Kamień
- Seat: Świerzno

Area
  - Total: 140.20 km^{2} (54.13 sq mi)

Population (2006)
  - Total: 4,174
  - Density: 29.77/km^{2} (77.11/sq mi)
- Website: https://www.swierzno.pl/

Gmina Świerzno is a rural gmina (administrative district) in Kamień County, West Pomeranian Voivodeship, in north-western Poland. Its seat is the village of Świerzno, which lies approximately 12 kilometres (7 mi) east of Kamień Pomorski and 66 km (41 mi) north-east of the regional capital Szczecin.

The gmina covers an area of 140.20 square kilometres (54.1 sq mi), and as of 2006 its total population is 4,174.

== Villages ==
Gmina Świerzno contains the villages and settlements of Będzieszewo, Chomino, Ciesław, Dąbrowa, Duniewo, Gostyń, Gostyniec, Grębice, Jatki, Kaleń, Kępica, Krzemykowo, Krzepocin, Margowo, Osiecze, Redliny, Rybice, Starza, Stuchowo, Sulikowo, Świerzno, Trzebieradz and Ugory.

== Neighbouring gminas ==
Gmina Świerzno is bordered by the gminas of Dziwnów, Golczewo, Gryfice, Kamień Pomorski, Karnice and Rewal.
