= Kälen =

- Location within Västerbotten Location within Sweden
- Coordinates: 64°17′5″N 20°52′57″E
- Country: Sweden
- County: Västerbotten County
- Municipality: Piteå Municipality

Area
  - Total: 12.42 km^{2} (4.80 sq mi)

Population (2005-12-31)
  - Total: 45
  - Density: 6.6/km^{2} (17/sq mi)
- Time zone: UTC+1 (CET)
  - Summer (DST): UTC+2 (CEST)

Kälen is a small village near Piteå in northern Sweden.
