= Old Head of Kinsale =

Headland near Kinsale, County Cork, Ireland

- An Seancheann (Irish)
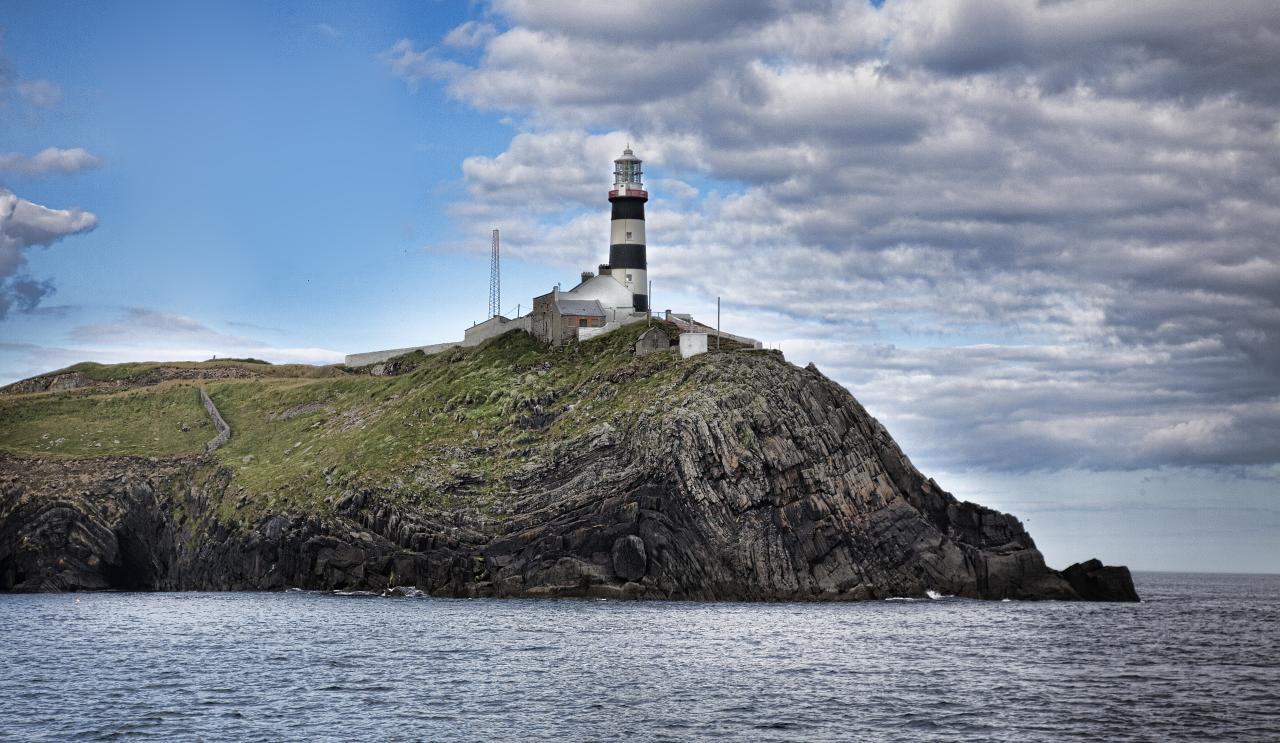
- Lighthouse on the Old Head

- Location within Ireland
- 51°36.287′N 8°32.018′W
- Type: Headland (with castle, lighthouse, golf course)

The Old Head of Kinsale (Irish: An Seancheann) is a headland near Kinsale, County Cork, Ireland.

A castle has been on the headland since at least the 3rd century, with the current iteration built in 1223. An early lighthouse was established here in the 17th century by Robert Reading. The area is the nearest point of land to where the RMS Lusitania was sunk in 1915, 18 kilometres (9 1/2 nautical miles) from the site of the sinking. Currently, access to the Old Head is restricted as it is on the site of a private golf course, which has proven to be controversial.

== Castle ==
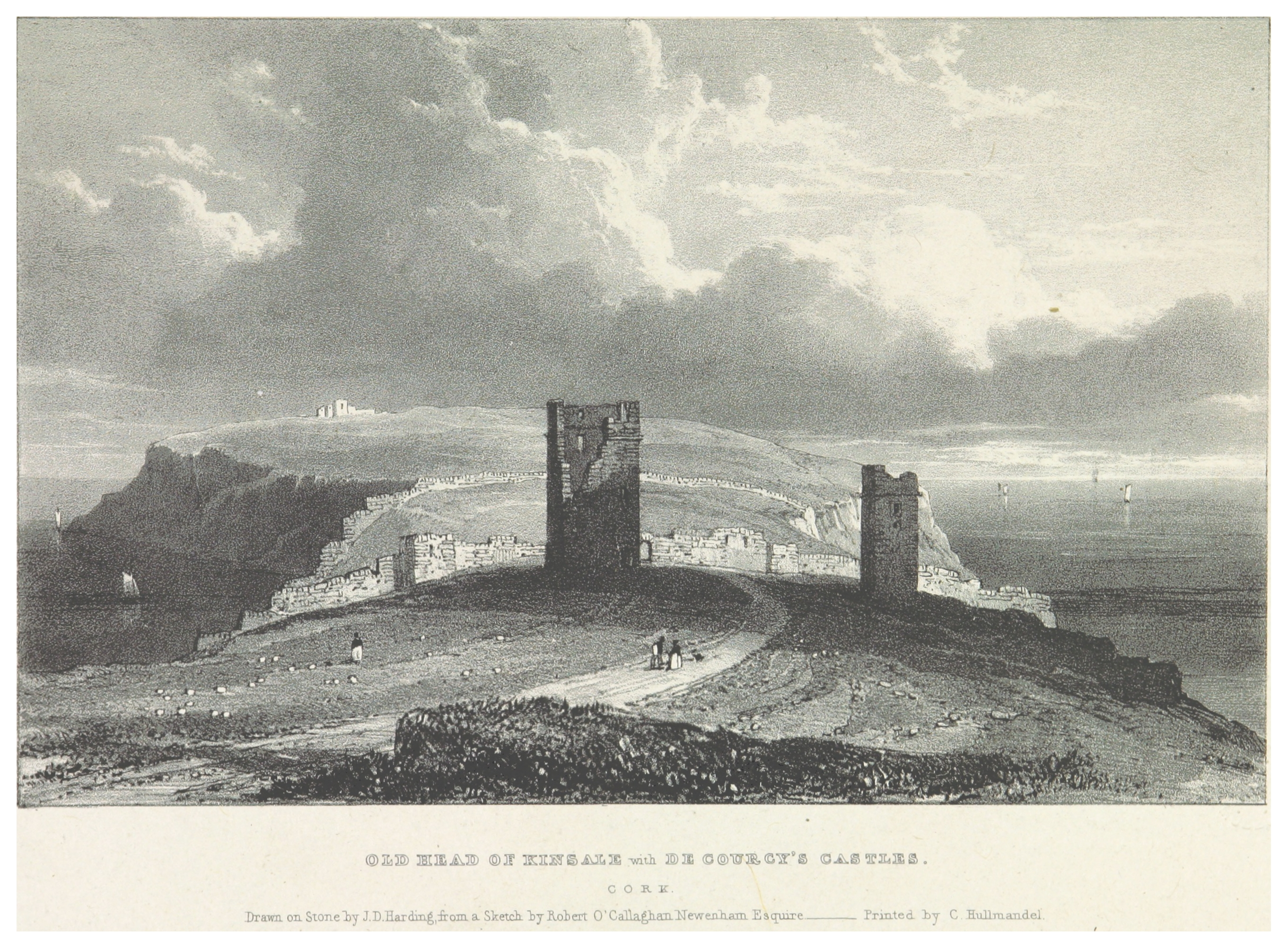
Old Head Castle, c. 1830

The Old Head Castle is made up of a long wall with several towers along it, which closes off the headland of the Old Head from the rest of the mainland. It is reported to have been built around the 3rd century AD by the Irish chieftain Cearmna. It was originally named Dún Cearmna (Cearmna's fort). The land was given to Milo de Cogan by King Henry II.

Following de Cogan's death, ownership passed to his son Richard, whose daughter married Milo de Courcy. De Courcy built a new castle around 1223. Consequently, the castle is sometimes called De Courcy Castle. In the 16th century, ownership of the castle passed to Owen MacCarthy, seizing it from the de Courcys. The English regained control of the castle in 1600, ahead of the Spanish invasion of Kinsale.

== Lighthouse ==
The Old Head has hosted "lighthouses" for millennia, with references to a beacon of light being maintained on the headland dating back to pre-Christian Ireland. On 13 November 1665 Charles II granted letters patent to Sir Robert Reading to construct six lighthouses around the coast of Ireland. One of these was established on the Old Head of Kinsale, and constituted the first lighthouse on the peninsula as would be recognised as such today. The lighthouse constituted a brazier on the roof of a cottage. There had been earlier beacons, but this was the first proper building which is still extant. Some time after 1683 the light was discontinued, and a petition presented to the House of Commons for its reinstatement.

In 1804 the Revenue Commissioners replaced the brazier with a temporary 1.8-metre (5.9 ft) lantern lit by oil lamps. Eight years later it was recommended that the temporary light be replaced by a permanent tower lighthouse with keepers' cottages at its base. The new light opened on 16 May 1814. This tower was 13 metres (43 ft) tall, and rose 90 metres (300 ft) above sea-level at high water. This proved to be too tall, as the light was often hidden by fog and low-lying clouds. Trinity House recommended a new lighthouse lower down right at the point of the Old Head. Construction started on 20 March 1850 and was completed three years later and first shone on 1 October 1853. Between 1855 and 1907 a red sector covered Courtmacsherry Bay. In 1893 a fog signal was established which was maintained until 2011.

A new lantern was installed in 1907 with the current character of "Gp Fl(2) W 10s" (a group of 2 white flashes repeated every 10 seconds). In 1972 the paraffin lamp was replaced by electricity and the range increased to 25 nautical miles (46 kilometres). Between 1974 and 1992 a radio beacon was transmitted. In 1987 the lighthouse was converted to automatic operation. In 2005 the range was reduced to 20 nautical miles (37 kilometres). In January 2009 an AIS station was established.

== Lusitania ==
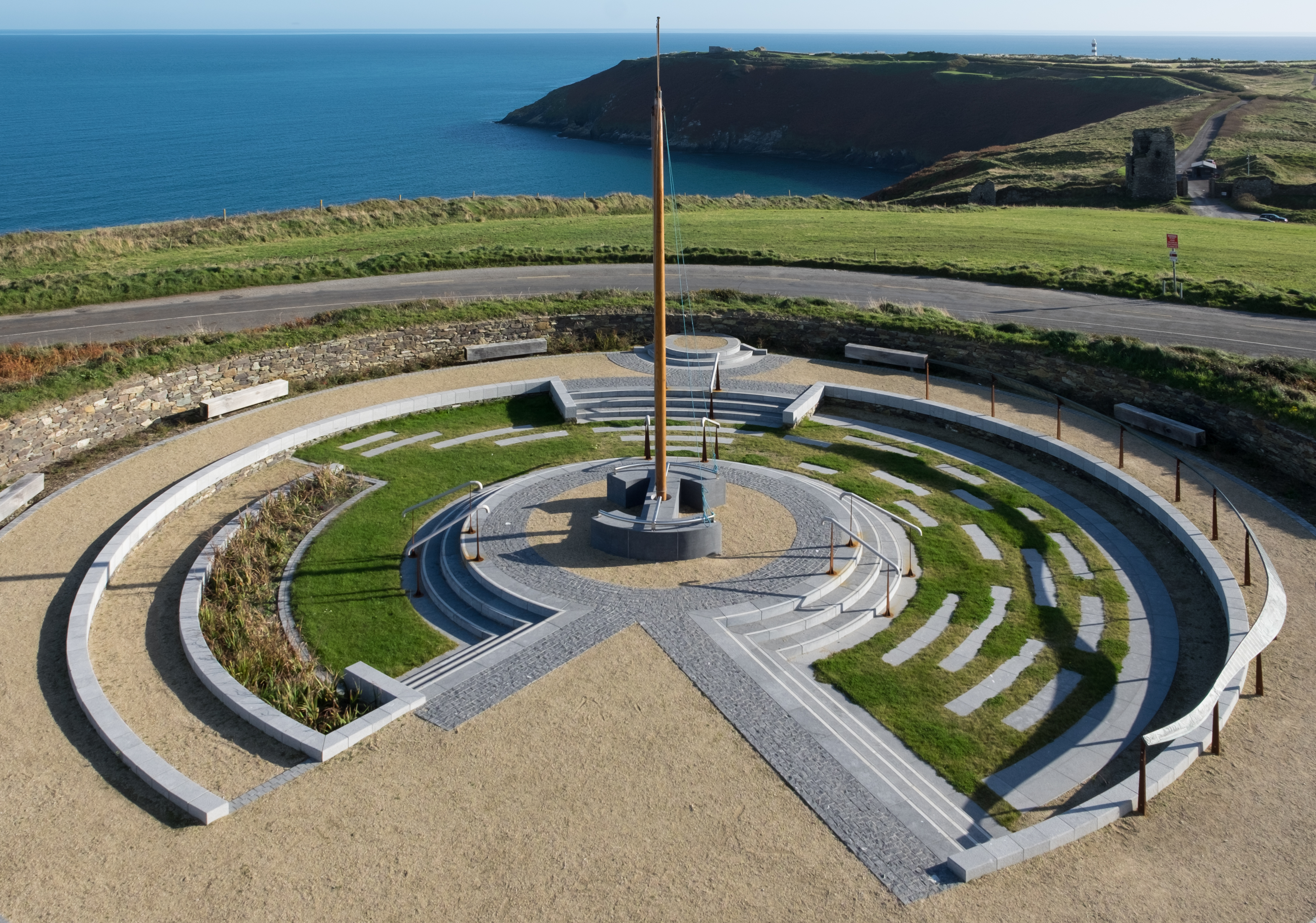
The Memorial Garden at the Lusitania Museum & Signal Tower Museum, Old Head

On 7 May 1915, RMS Lusitania, a passenger liner operated by the Cunard Line, was travelling from New York to Liverpool, when she was torpedoed by a German U-boat, around 18 kilometres (9 1/2 nautical miles) from the Old Head of Kinsale. The liner sank in 18 minutes, killing 1,197 of the 1,959 passengers and crew. The ship could be clearly seen from the shore and many local people observed the sinking and helped organise the rescue efforts. The bodies were subsequently transported to Queenstown. In 2015, to commemorate the 100th anniversary of the sinking, a museum opened at the signal tower of the Old Head lighthouse. The owner of the wreck of the Lusitania lent various artefacts, which had been recovered by Eoin McGarry four years earlier during an authorised dive, to house in the museum.

== Golf ==
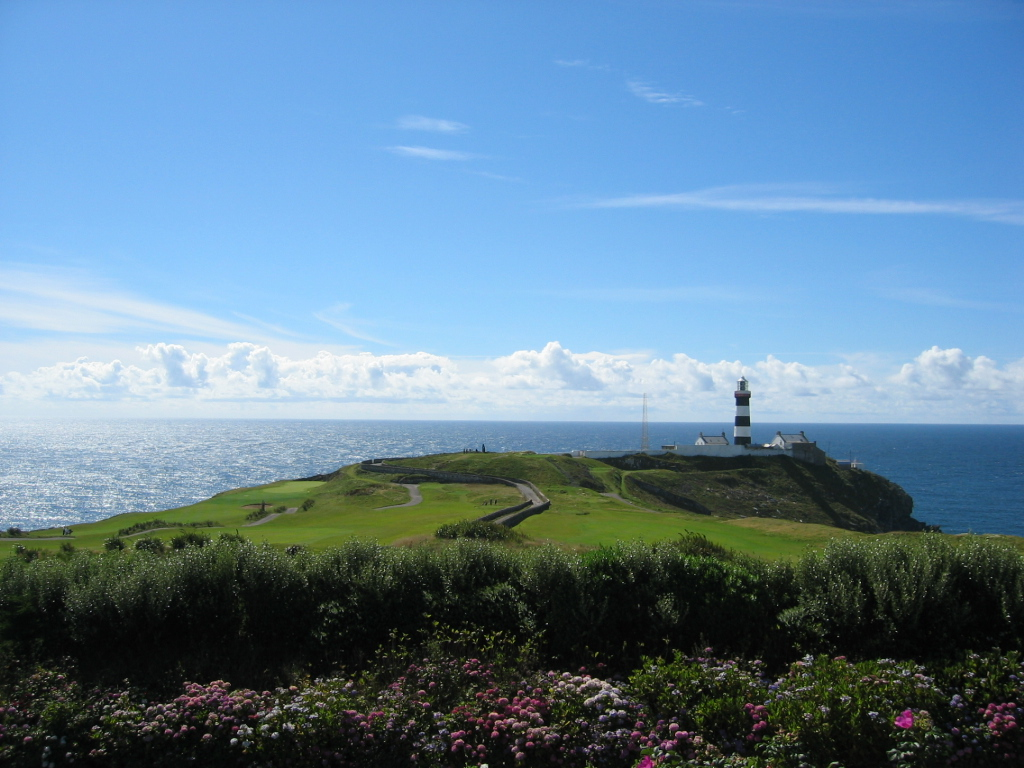
The lighthouse and a portion of the Old Head Golf Links

Today, the Old Head of Kinsale is visited by golfers who come to play on its 18-hole golf course that opened in 1997.

Since the golf course opened, access to the Old Head of Kinsale has been restricted to golfers and guests only, and there has been a long-running campaign for the restoration of public access organised by the "Free the Old Head of Kinsale" campaign. This has mainly taken the format of "people's picnics", some of them involving "incursions" onto the headland and holding the picnics at the Old Head lighthouse.

== See also ==
- Lighthouses in Ireland
