= Świerzno, West Pomeranian Voivodeship =

Świerzno
- Village
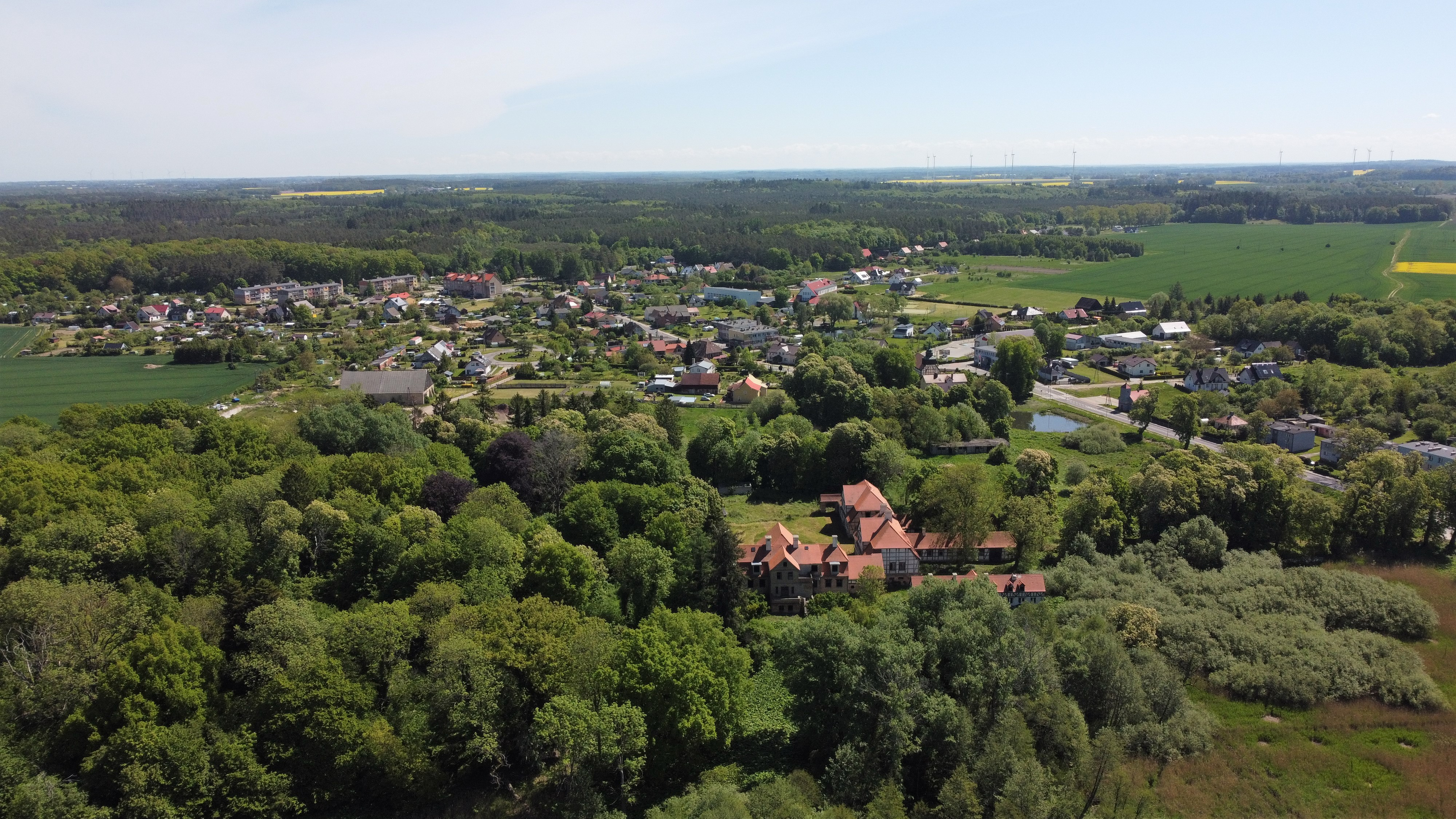

- Coat of arms

- Location within Poland
- Coordinates: 53°57′53″N 14°57′56″E
- Country: Poland
- Voivodeship: West Pomeranian
- County: Kamień
- Gmina: Świerzno

Population
  - Total: 670
- Time zone: UTC+1 (CET)
  - Summer (DST): UTC+2 (CEST)
- Vehicle registration: ZKA
- Website: https://swierzno.pl

Świerzno (Polish: [ˈɕfjɛʐnɔ]; German: Schwirsen) is a village in Kamień County, West Pomeranian Voivodeship, in north-western Poland. It is the seat of the gmina (administrative district) called Gmina Świerzno. It lies approximately 12 km (7 mi) east of Kamień Pomorski and 66 km (41 mi) north-east of the regional capital Szczecin.

The village has a population of 670.

== Notable residents ==
- Ernst Ziemer (1911-1986), Wehrmacht officer
