= Biała Góra =

Biała Góra (Polish for "White Mountain") may refer to these places in Poland:

- Biała Góra, Łęczyca County in Łódź Voivodeship (central Poland)
- Biała Góra, Poddębice County in Łódź Voivodeship (central Poland)
- Biała Góra, Masovian Voivodeship (east-central Poland)
- Biała Góra, Pomeranian Voivodeship (north Poland), near where the Nogat splits off from the lower Vistula
- Biała Góra, Warmian-Masurian Voivodeship (north Poland)
- Biała Góra, Kamień County in West Pomeranian Voivodeship (north-west Poland)
- Biała Góra, Świdwin County in West Pomeranian Voivodeship (north-west Poland)
- Biała Góra, a hill near Miechów in Lesser Poland Voivodeship
- White Mountain (Wolin) (Polish: Biała Góra), a hill in West Pomeranian Voivodeship
