= Biała Góra, Kamień County =

Hamlet in Kamień County, West Pomeranian Voivodeship, Poland

Biała Góra
- Hamlet
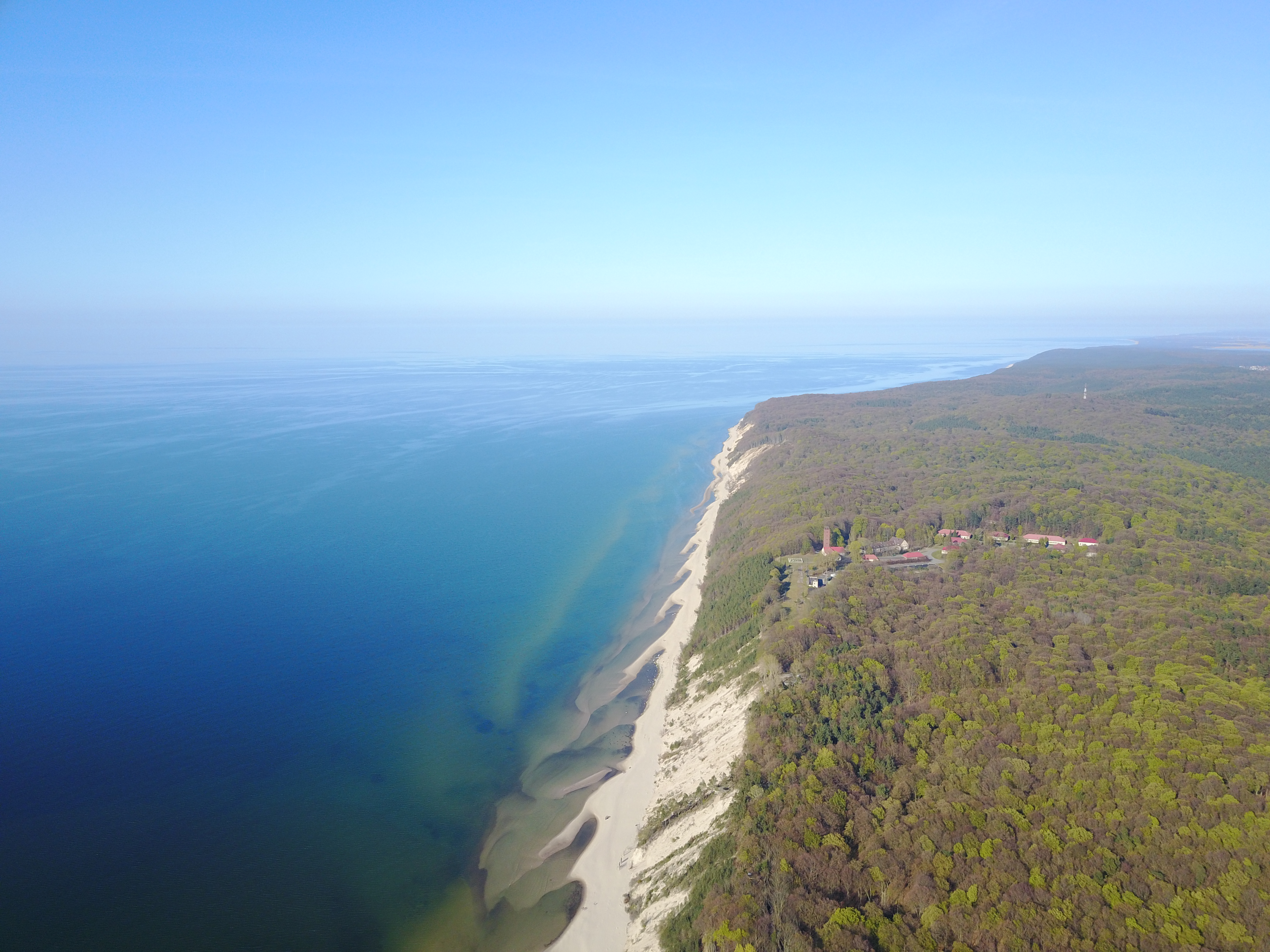
- The aerial view of Biała Góra in 2019.

- Location within Poland
- Coordinates: 53°56′46″N 14°28′39″E
- Country: Poland
- Voivodeship: West Pomeranian
- County: Kamień
- Municipality: Międzyzdroje
- Time zone: UTC+1 (CET)
  - Summer (DST): UTC+2 (CEST)
- Postal code: 72-500
- Area code: +48 91
- Car plates: ZKA

Biała Góra (Polish: [ˈbja.wa ˈɡu.ra]; lit. 'White Mountaint'), from 1946 to 2010 known as Janogród (Polish: [jaˈnɔ.ɡrut]), is a hamlet in the West Pomeranian Voivodeship, Poland, located within the municipality of Międzyzdroje in Kamień County. It is located around 2 km (1.24 mi) to the northeast of the city of Międzyzdroje on the island Wolin. The hamlet is placed on the foothill of the White Mountain, a hill which forms a part of the Wolin Range, and on the top of the cliff on the coast of the Baltic Sea. It features the historic decommissioned military complex, created in the 1930s as a training facility of the German War Navy, and later expanded in 1950 as the heavy artillery complex of the Polish Navy, used until 1977, and later serving until 2011 as an anti-aircraft base. It also features the Natural Environment Monitoring Station of the Adam Mickiewicz University, a research facility specialised in botany, geography, and geology, among others. The hamlet is located within the Wolin National Park.

== History ==
In the 1930s, a complex of military barracks have been developed on top of a cliff at the foothill of the White Mountain, to the northeast of the city of Międzyzdroje (then Misdroy). It was placed on the coast of the Baltic Sea on the island of Wolin. The complex housed the naval anti-aircraft training facility of the German War Navy. The area have been captured on 5 May 1945 during the Second World War, Międzyzdroje together with it surroundings was captured by the 19th Army of the 2nd Belorussian Front in the Red Army of the Soviet Union, during the offensive into the islands of Wolin and Usedom which begun on 30 April 1945. The barracks have been deserted. In an agreement signed on 21 September 1945 in Schwerin, the city of Międzyzdroje was given to Poland, entering into force on 4 October 1945.

After the end of the conflict, the area of the military complex was named Janogród. In 1950, the former complex have been adopted to house a garrison of the 31st Coastal Artillery Division of the Polish Navy, to provide an anti-landing defense and ensure the safety of the coastal shipping routes in the area. It included the construction of four 130 mm (5.12 in) heavy artillery guns (including two three-storey guns), two fire-control towers, a rangefinder bunker, and technical support buildings. The garrison was originally called as Miedzyzdroje, and was later renamed to Janogród. On 1 November 1950, the unit was disolved, with the Janogród garrison forming the 17th Fixed Artillery Battery, which in 1951, was subordinated to the Polish Navy military base in Świnoujście. It remained in operation until 1977. In 1974, the 8th Anti-Aircraft Artillery Battalion of the Polish Navy was formed, being based in Janogród. In 2003, it was reformed into the 8th Anti-Aircraft Division and moved to the base in Dziwnów. The base in Janogród continued to be used by it until 2011.

On 15 March 1960, the Wolin National Park was established as one of the 23 national parks of Poland, incorporating Janogród with the military complex into its territory. While majority of the military complex remains as a restricted area, its small portion have been made available to the public, as part of the White Mountain blaze trail showcasing its historic structures. Between 2018 and 2019, three decommissioned bomb shelters have been adopted to provide the hibernaculum for bats.

On 17 April 1996, the Natural Environment Monitoring Station of the Adam Mickiewicz University was founded in Biała Góra. It was established as research facility of the Department of Geoecology and Natural Environment Monitoring of the Adam Mickiewicz University in Poznań, Poland, specialised in botany, geography, and geology, among others. On 1 December 2009, the Międzyzdroje division of the Szczecin National Archive was founded in Janogród, replacing and taking on the tasks of its former division in Płoty in West Pomeranian Voivodeship, Poland. On 1 January 2011, the hamlet was renamed from Janogród to Biała Góra.

== Characteristics ==
Biała Góra is a hamlet located around 2 km (1.24 mi) to the northeast of the city of Międzyzdroje. It is placed on the foothill of the White Mountain, a hill with the height of 65 m (213.26 ft) which forms a part of the Wolin Range, and on the top of the cliff on the coast of the Baltic Sea. Its territory forms a part of the Wolin National Park, a one of the 23 national parks of Poland.

The hamlet includes a historic decommissioned complex of military barracks and structures, originally created in the 1930s, and used until 1945 by the German War Navy, and later expanded in 1950 with the heavy artillery of the Polish Navy, used until 1977. The base was later also used from 1974 to 2011 as an anti-aircraft base of the Polish Navy. Currently, the historic military barracks and the heavy artillery are registered in the municipal heritage list. While the majority of the complex remain as a restricted area, its small portion have been made available to the public, as part of the White Mountain blaze trail showcasing its historic structures. It forms the best preserved out of all heavy artillery complexes developed by the Polish Navy across the Baltic coast in the 1940s and 1950s. Three decommissioned bomb shelters of the military complex have been adopted to provide the hibernaculum for bats.

The hamlet also features the Natural Environment Monitoring Station of the Adam Mickiewicz University, a research facility of the Department of Geoecology and Natural Environment Monitoring of the Adam Mickiewicz University in Poznań, Poland, specialised in botany, geography, and geology, among others, as well as the Międzyzdroje division of the Szczecin National Archive. It also includes the Biała Góra Educational Base, which serves as a training and educational institution of the Wolin National Park.
