= Janogród =

Janogród may refer to:

- Biała Góra, a hamlet in West Pomeranian Voivodeship, Poland, formerly known as Janogród;
- Ivaniškiai, a village of Kaunas County, Lithuania, formerly known in Polish as Janogród.
