= White Mountain (Wolin) =

Hill in West Pomeranian Voivodeship, Poland

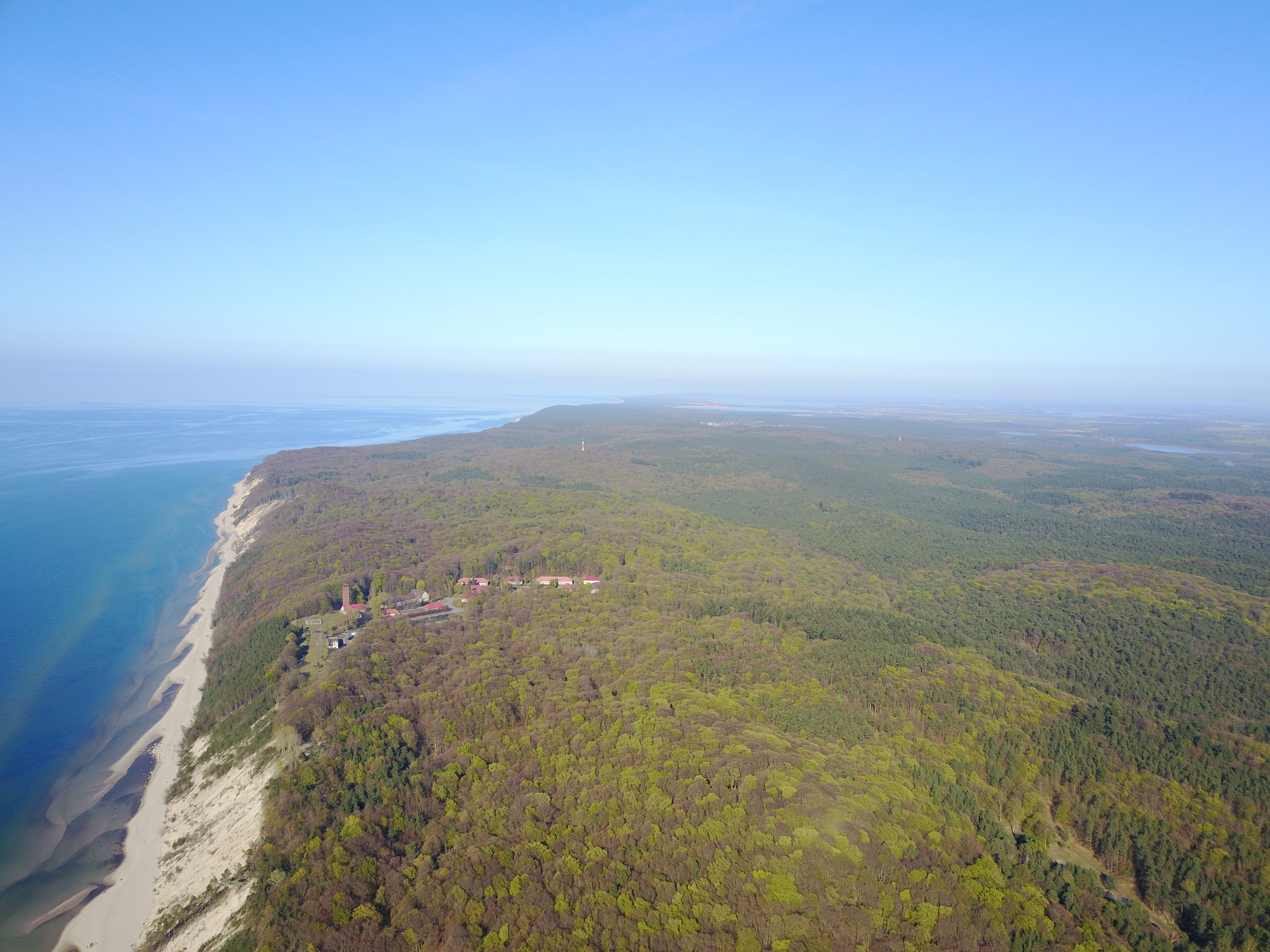
- The aerial view of the White Mountain, and the hamlet of Biała Góra, in 2019.

Highest point
- Elevation: 65 m (213 ft)
- Coordinates: 53°56′46″N 14°28′39″E

Geography
- Country: Poland
- Voivodeship: West Pomeranian Voivodeship
- County: Kamień County
- Gmina: Gmina Międzyzdroje

The White Mountain (Note: Polish: Biała Góra; German: Weiße Berg, Weißer Berg) is a hill of the Wolin Range, located in the north-eastern part of the island of Wolin, in the West Pomeranian Voivodeship, Poland, within Gmina Międzyzdroje, Kamień County. Its height above mean sea level is 65 m (213.26 ft). To the southeast from the hill is located the hamlet of Biała Góra.
