= Międzyzdroje Pier =

Pier in Międzyzdroje, Poland

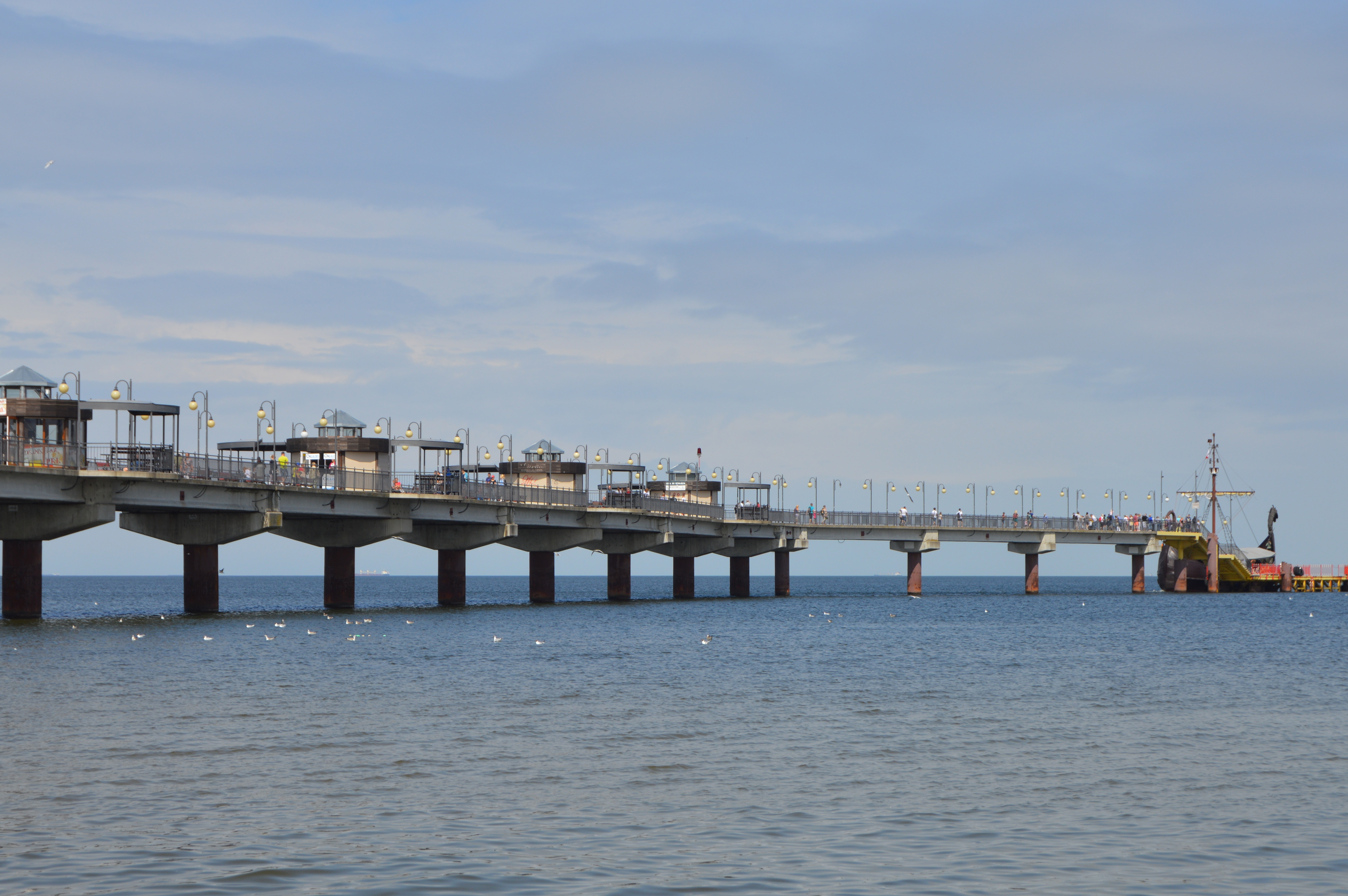
- Międzyzdroje Pier panorama
- Type: Recreational pier
- Coordinates: 53.56°N 14.26°E
- Official name: Molo w Międzyzdrojach

Characteristics
- Total length: 395 metres (1,296 ft)

History
- Opening date: 1996 (1895)
- Międzyzdroje Pier (Poland) Międzyzdroje Pier (West Pomeranian Voivodeship) Międzyzdroje Pier (Baltic Sea)

Międzyzdroje Pier (Polish: Molo w Międzyzdrojach) is a pier 395 metres long, stretching out into the Baltic Sea from the beach in Międzyzdroje, West Pomeranian Voivodeship, Poland. The pier also functions as a harbour.

== Construction ==
The pier is made of reinforced concrete, on the Island of Wolin, Poland. The structure extends into the Bay of Pomerania, in the north-west direction from the beach in Międzyzdroje. The pier is located close by to the amphitheatre in the central part of Międzyzdroje Beach. The entrance onto the pier is marked by two white towers.
