= Międzyzdroje =

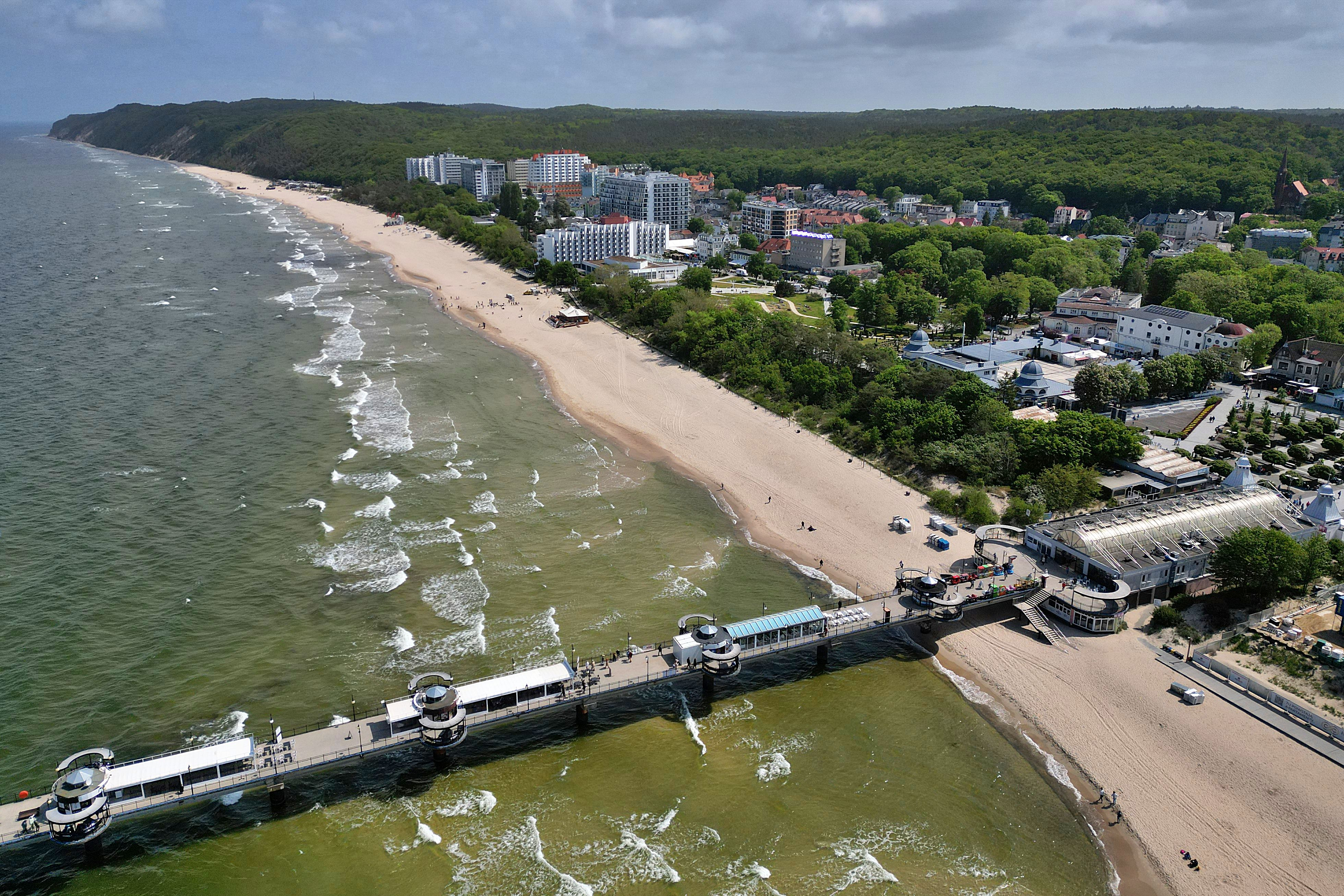
- Aerial view of Międzyzdroje with the beach and pier

- Coat of arms

- Location within Poland
- Coordinates: 53°55′37″N 14°27′2″E
- Country: Poland
- Voivodeship: West Pomeranian
- County: Kamień
- Gmina: Międzyzdroje
- Established: 15th century
- Town rights: 1945

Government
  - Mayor: Mateusz Bobek

Area
  - Total: 4.51 km^{2} (1.74 sq mi)

Population (2016)
  - Total: 5,443
  - Density: 1,210/km^{2} (3,100/sq mi)
- Time zone: UTC+1 (CET)
  - Summer (DST): UTC+2 (CEST)
- Postal code: 72-500
- Area code: +48 91
- Car plates: ZKA
- Website: Międzyzdroje

Międzyzdroje (pronounced ['mʲɛnd͡zɨˈzdrɔjɛ]; German: Misdroy), historically known as Misdroy in English, is a city and a seaside resort in northwestern Poland on the island of Wolin on the Baltic coast. The city is located in the West Pomeranian Voivodeship, and is the seat of Gmina Międzyzdroje. In 2016, it was inhabited by around 5,500 people.

The town is often referred to as The Pearl of the Baltic. It is situated between wide sandy beaches with high cliffs and the forests of the Woliński National Park (which includes a bison reserve). Międzyzdroje has a spa climate and is rich in tourist services.

== History ==
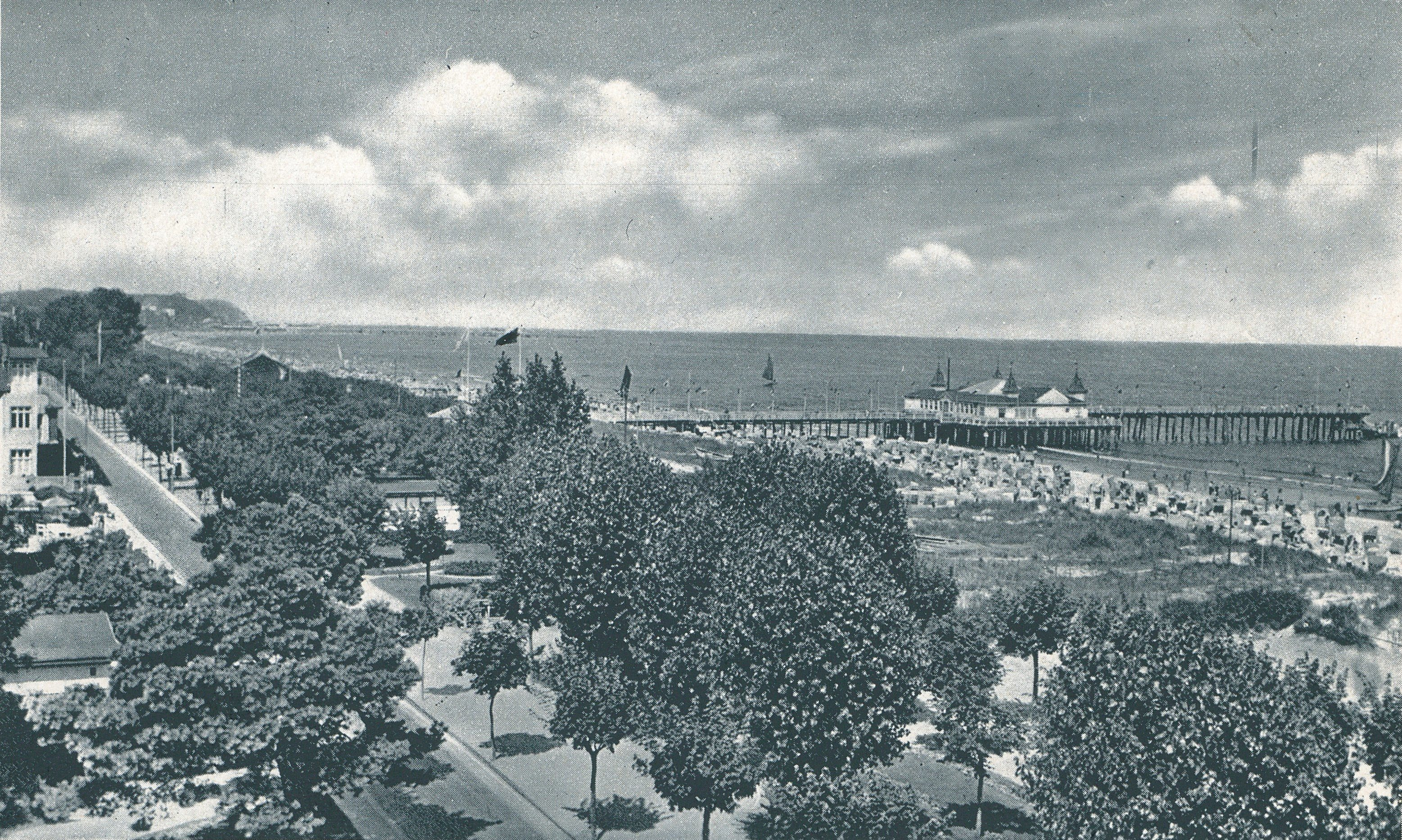
Międzyzdroje between 1936 and 1945

The territory became part of the emerging Polish state under its first ruler Mieszko I around 967. Following the fragmentation of Poland, it formed part of the Duchy of Pomerania. Towards the very end of the 12th century two settled camps or settlements have been established within the present-day town limits. Both of these settlements, with a mining and agricultural focus, were property of the Bishopric of Kamien Pomorski. The first initial name of the town appeared in the 15th century as Misdroige. According to sources, the early Slavic settlers were involved primarily in agriculture, cattle-breeding, fishing, bee-keeping and hunting.

The entire island of Wolin, including Międzyzdroje, was captured by the Swedish Empire in 1630 during the Thirty Years' War. Sweden ceded control of the island to Prussia in the 1720 Treaties of Stockholm. A particularly noticeable increase in the number of inhabitants, mostly local but also foreign, was recorded throughout the 18th century. During this time, the village began to evolve into a luxurious spa resort as a result of strong English influence in the development of sea baths.

In the first half of the industrial 19th century, Europeans of different backgrounds began to visit Misdroy and appreciate its baths, health clinics and climate. With the arrival of tourists and the development of the tourist sector in the area, the once small, insignificant fishing village rapidly transformed into a popular health resort. In 1835, the gender-segregated baths were constructed by English and German merchants and entrepreneurs. Wealthy industrialists and business magnates from Szczecin, Berlin and London would erect their extravagant villas along the Baltic shore.

One of the earliest public parks was created in 1860 as an initiative of a wealthy Belgian merchant named Arnold Lejeune. A wooden pier on the Baltic Sea was constructed and eventually upgraded in 1906. The pier was 360 metres in length and the coffee-house situated at its very end still operates to this day.

In 1899, Misdroy was connected via railway with nearby Szczecin and Świnoujście, which contributed to an even greater number of patient and tourist arrivals. Shortly before the outbreak of World War I, over 20,000 visitors were recorded, an astonishing and record-breaking number in that period.

Prior to World War II, the town had around 4,000 permanent residents. During World War II, in February 1945, a German-perpetrated death march of Allied prisoners-of-war from the Stalag XX-B POW camp passed through the settlement. The town did not suffer destruction during the course of the war. After the war, the Międzyzdroje became part of the Polish People's Republic in 1945 in accordance with the Potsdam Agreement, and was granted town status.

The town's Polish name comes from its original 16th-century meaning of the "town between salts springs", or Międzyzdroje in Polish.

In 1959, town limits were expanded.

== Sights ==
- Beach and pier
- Fryderyk Chopin Spa Park with a monument of the Polish composer
- Wax museum
- Nature Museum of the Wolin National Park
- Walk of Fame (Promenada Gwiazd)
- Baltic Miniature Park (Bałtycki Park Miniatur)
- Saint Peter church
- Culture Center
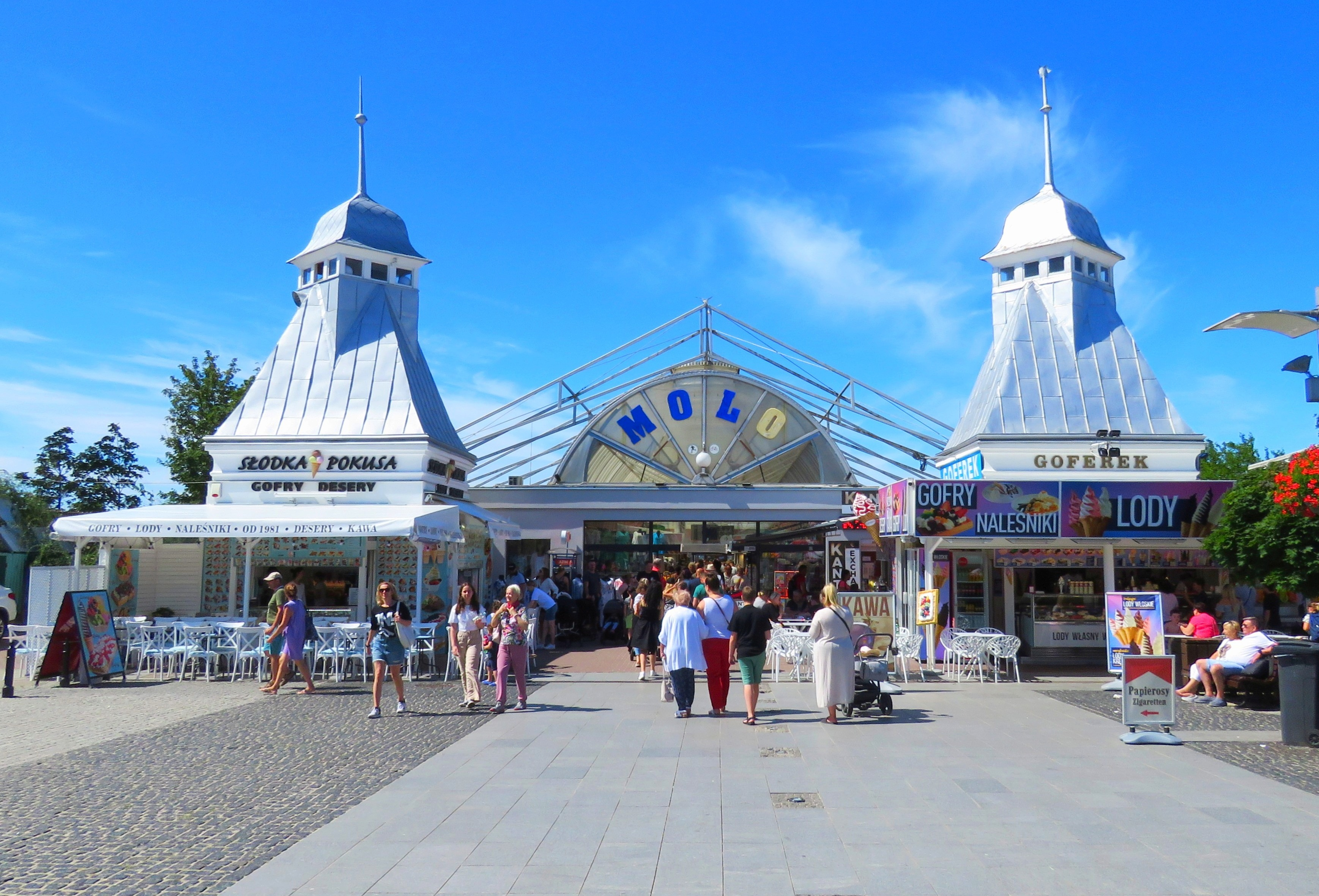
Międzyzdroje Pier

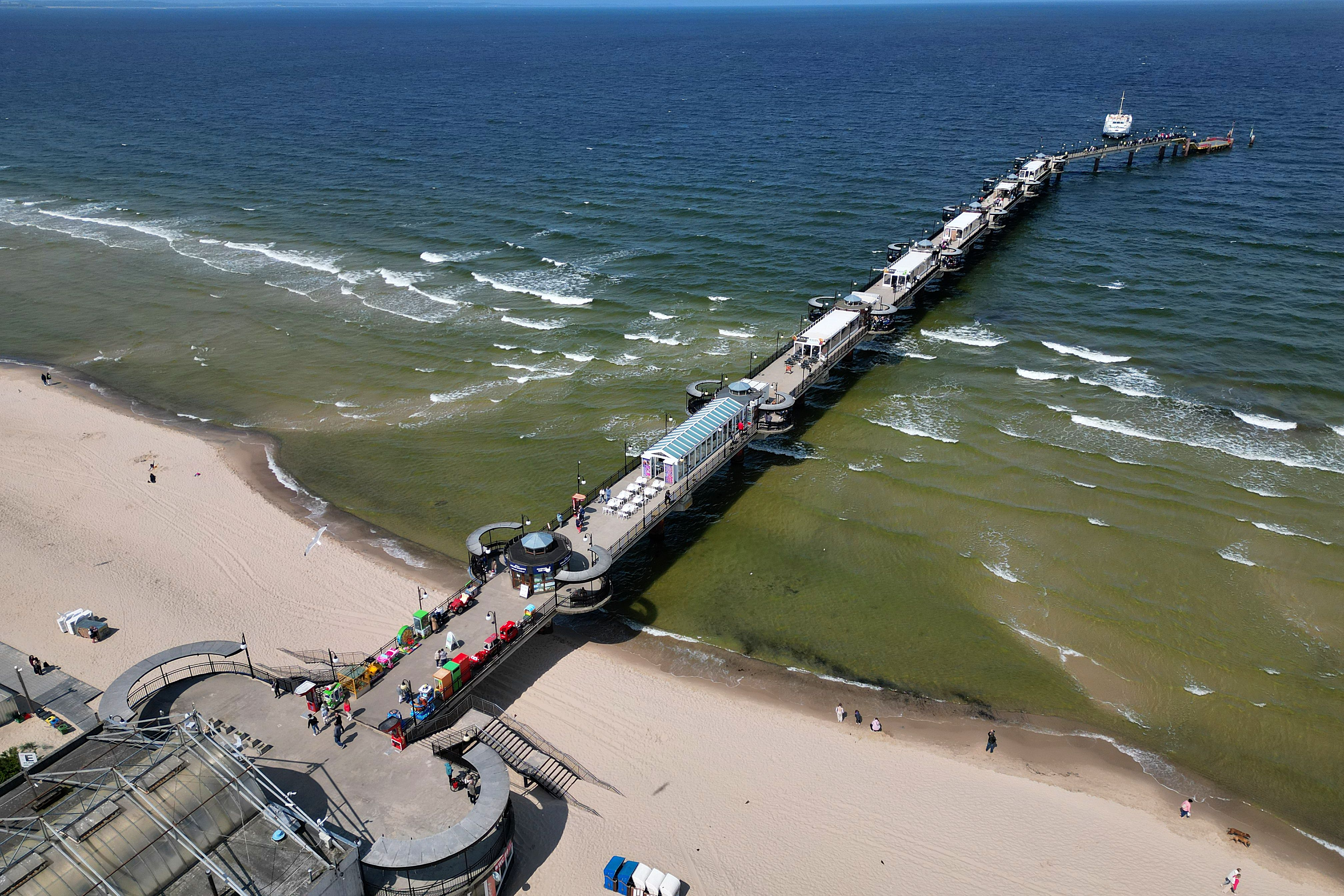
Aerial view of the pier

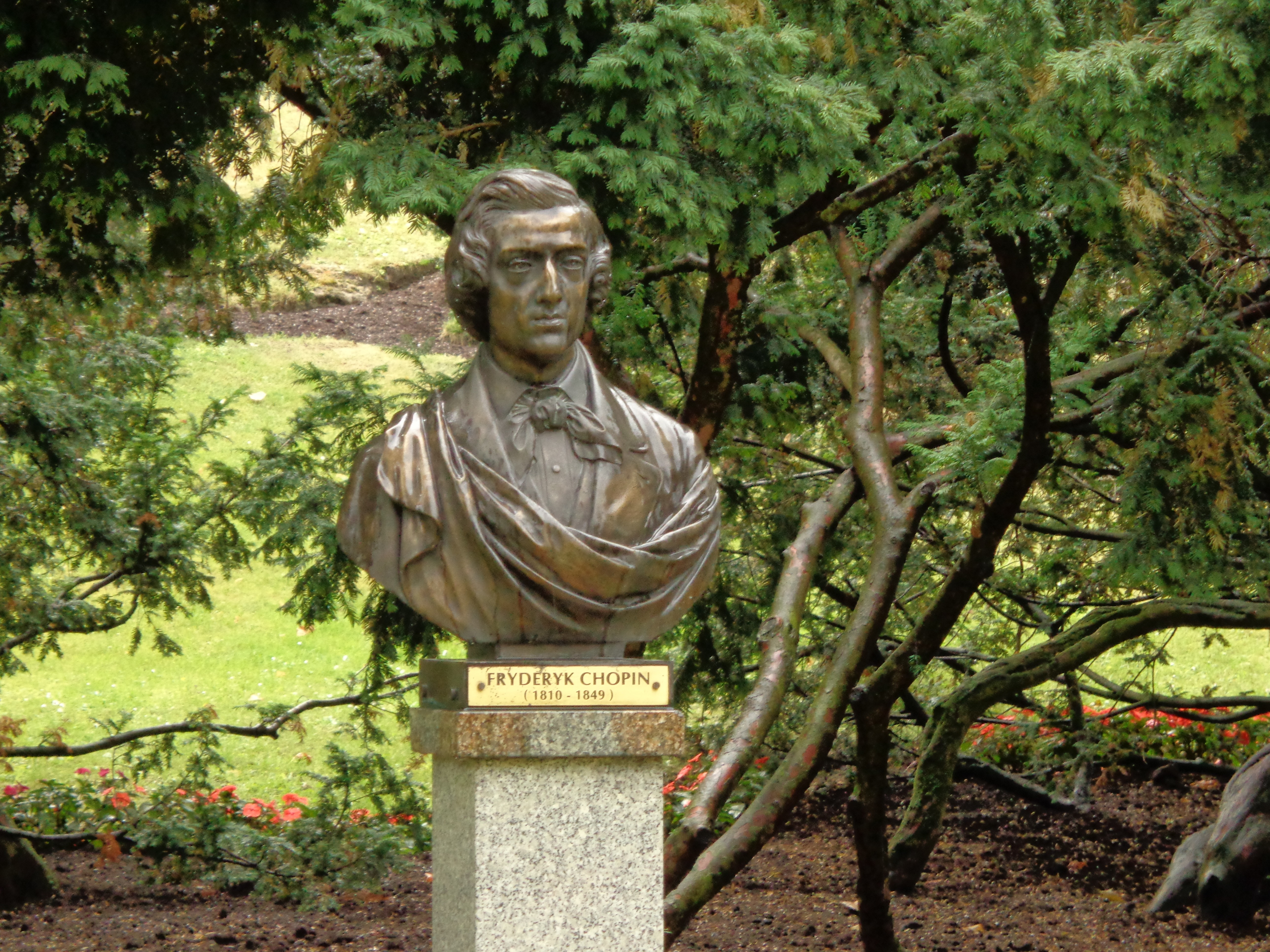
Bust of Fryderyk Chopin

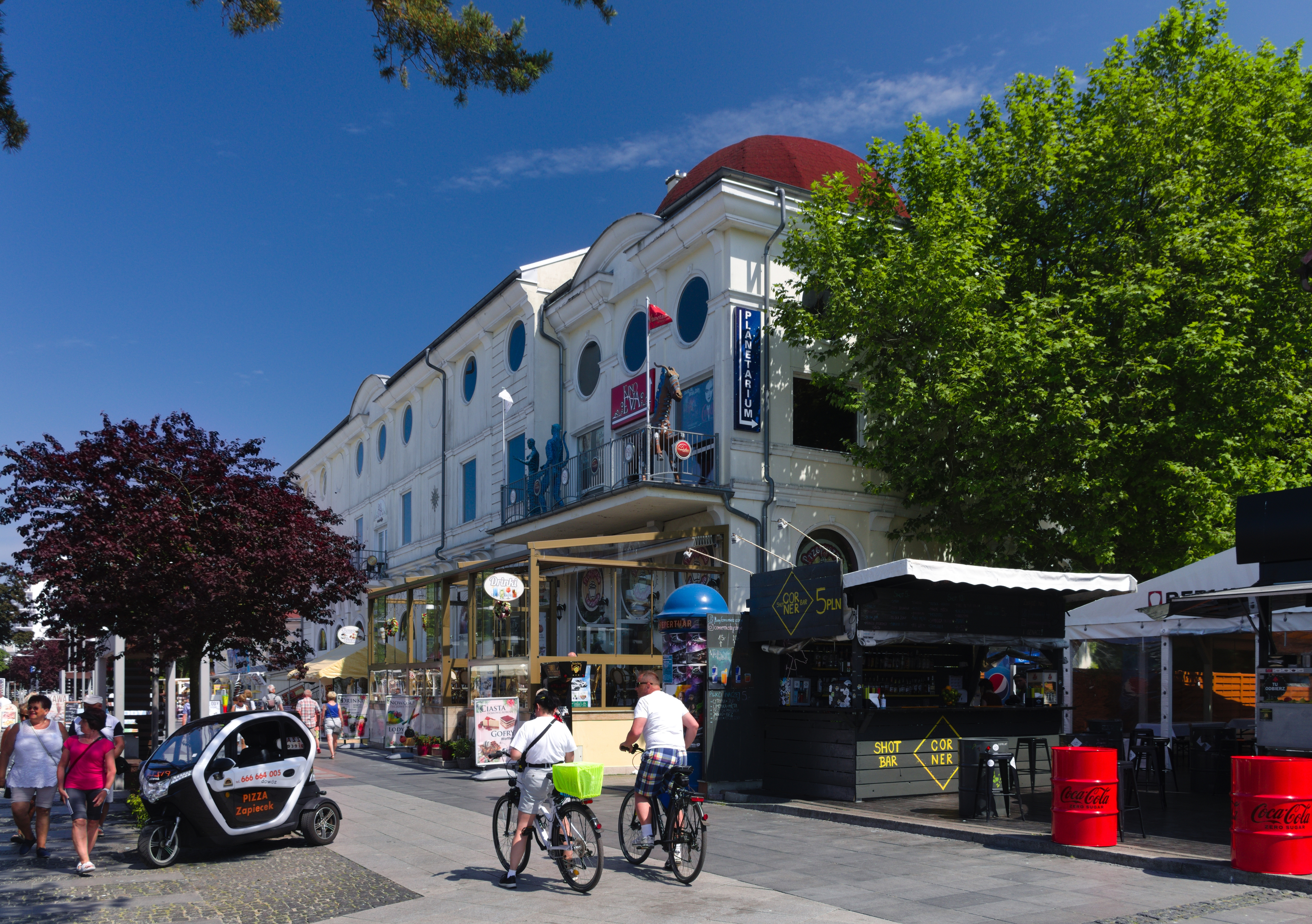
Wax museum

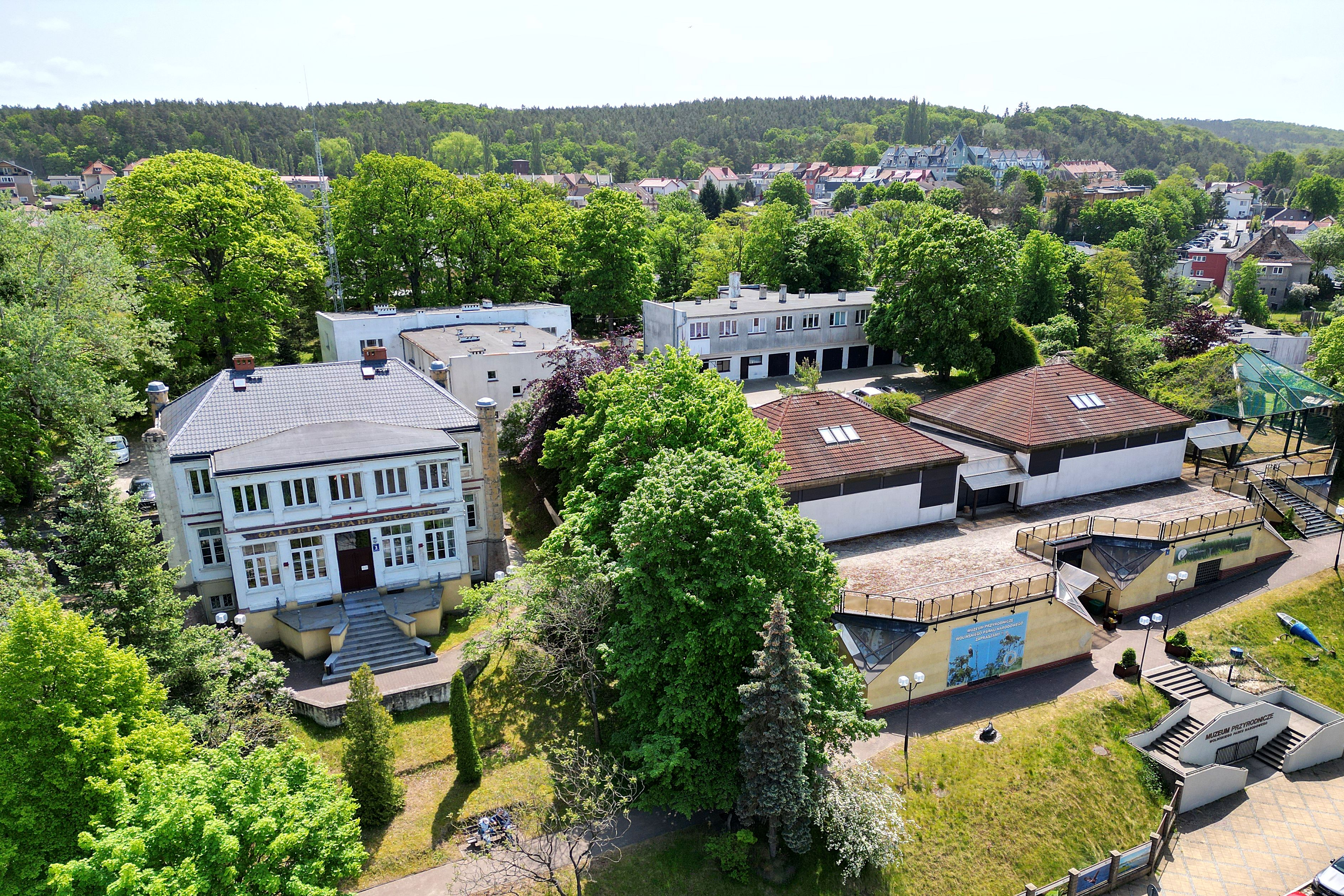
Nature Museum of the Wolin National Park

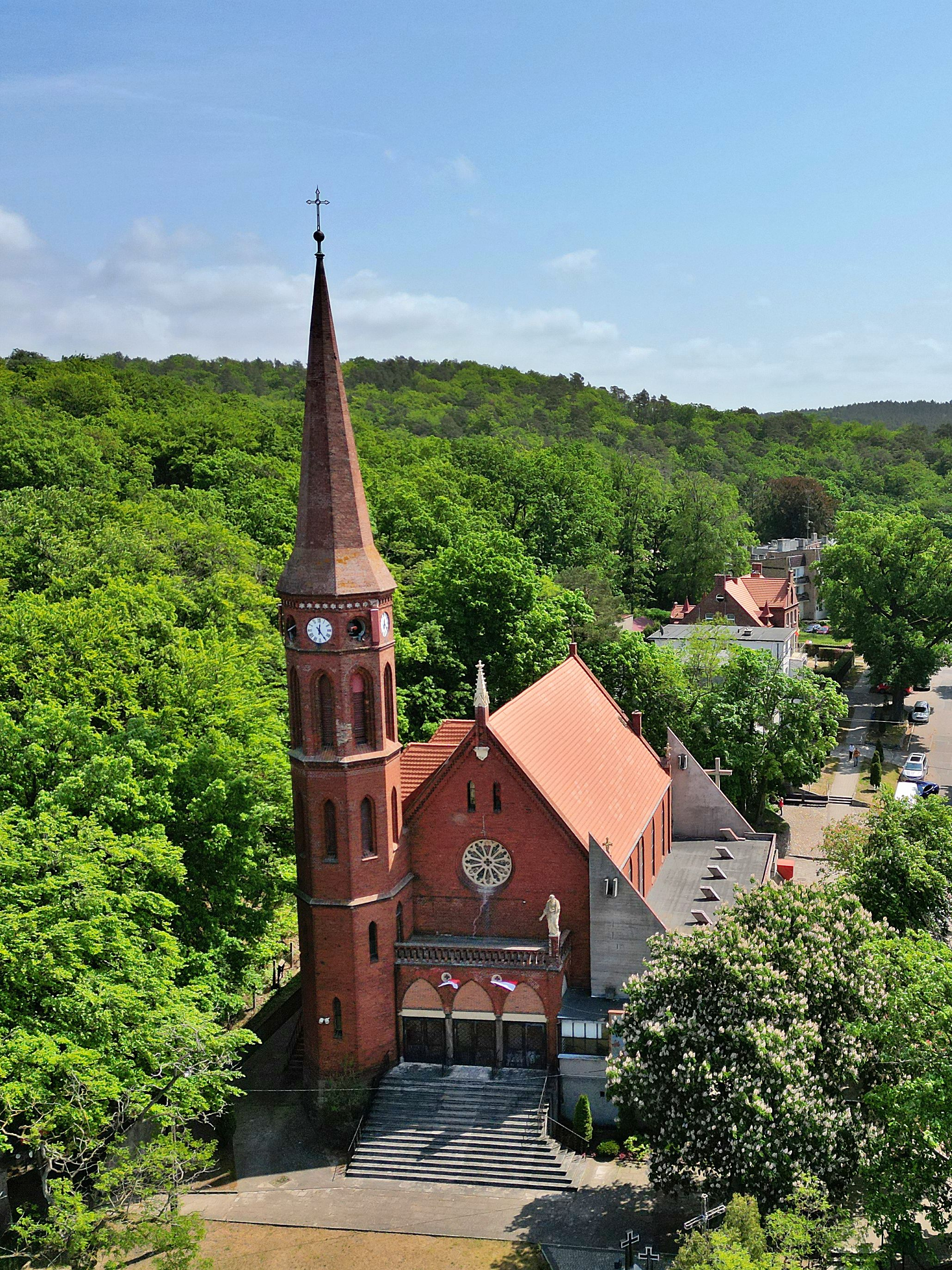
Saint Peter church

== Transport ==
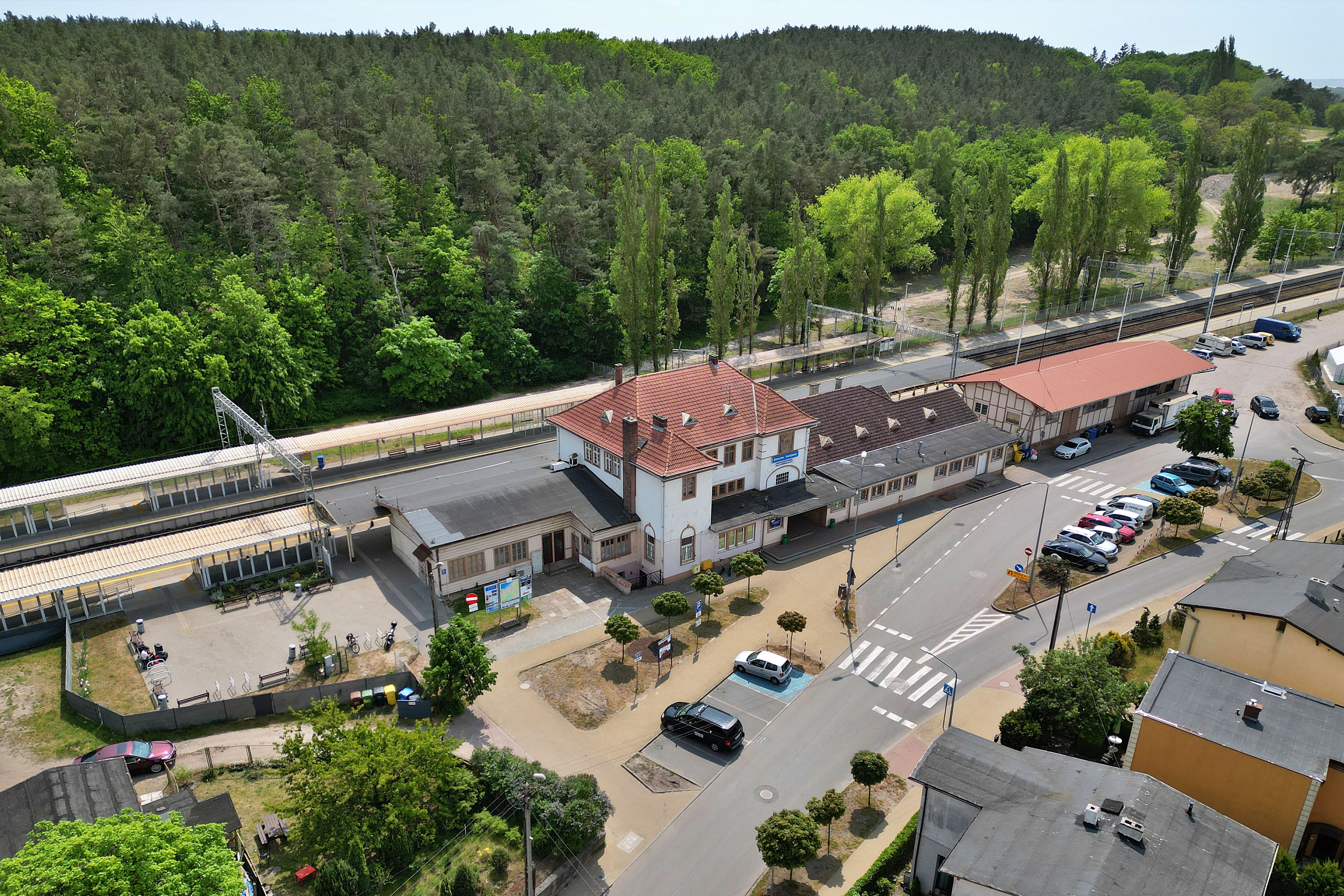
Międzyzdroje railway station

Międzyzdroje is located at the intersection of the S3 expressway and Voivodeship road 102. There is also a railway station.

== International relations ==
Międzyzdroje was the birthplace of the Harvard World Model United Nations Conference in 1991.

Międzyzdroje is twinned with:

- Bakhchysarai Raion, Ukraine
- Čačak, Serbia
- Helsingborg, Sweden
- Izola, Slovenia
- Lomma, Sweden
- Sellin, Germany

== Notable residents ==
- Ernst Eiselen (1792 - 1846 in Misdroy), German gymnast and a promoter of the Jahn style of gymnastics
- Hermann Wilhelm Ebel (1820 – 1875 in Misdroy), German philologist
- Albert Sauer (1898–1945), German Nazi SS concentration camp commandant
- Prince Claus of the Netherlands (1926–2002), husband of Queen Beatrix, he attended the Baltenschule Misdroy from 1938 until 1942
- Grischa Huber (1944–2021), German actress
- Wiesław Chmielewski (born 1957), Polish modern pentathlete
