= Wolin National Park =

National park in Poland

- Woliński Park Narodowy
- IUCN category II (national park)
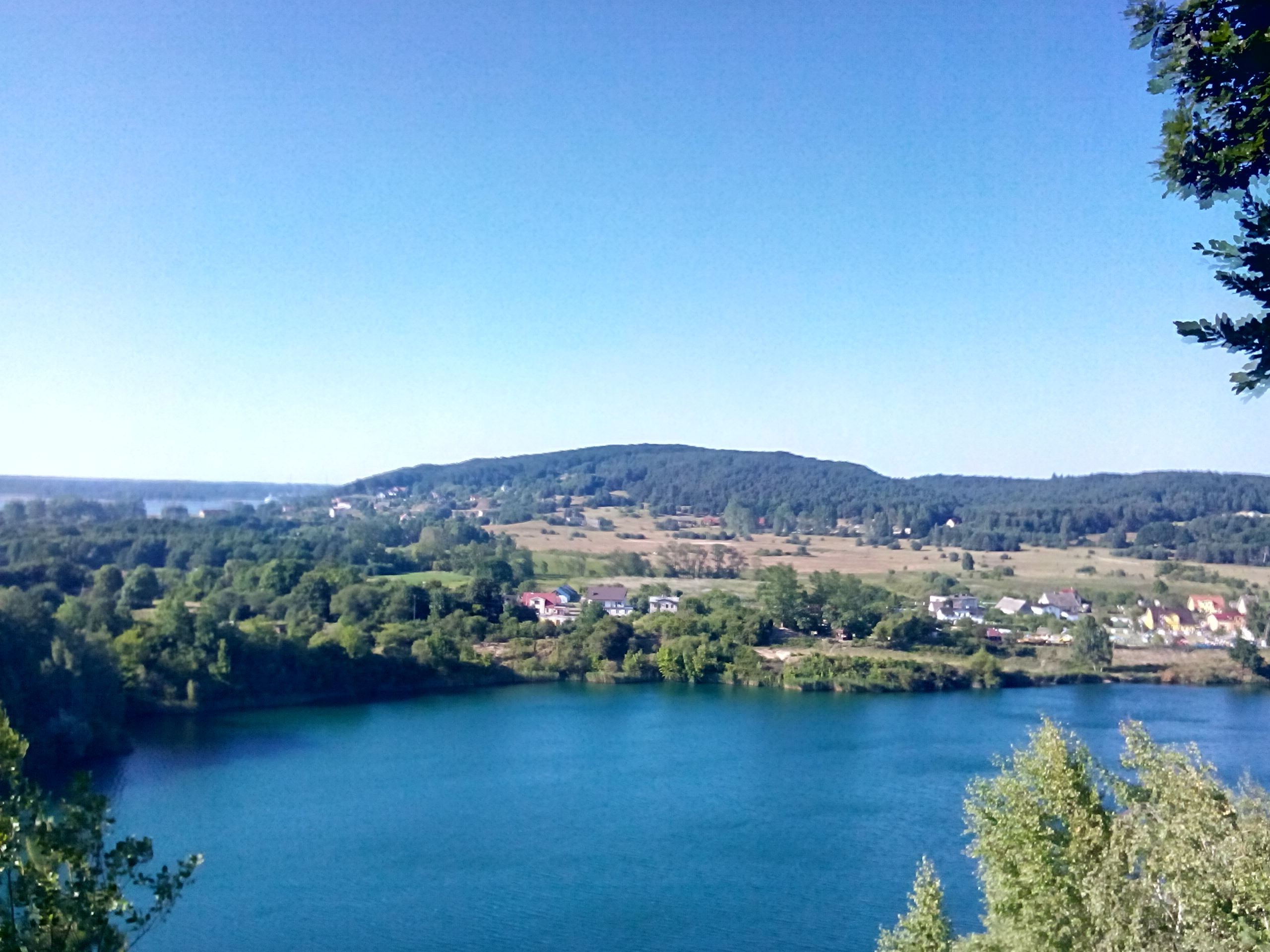
- Turquoise Lake (Polish: Jezioro Turkusowe)
- Interactive map of Wolin National Park
- Location: West Pomeranian Voivodeship, Poland
- Coordinates: 53°56′N 14°27′E
- Area: 109.37 km^{2} (42.23 sq mi)
- Established: 1960
- Governing body: Ministry of the Environment
- Website: Official website

Wolin National Park (Polish: Woliński Park Narodowy) is one of 23 national parks in Poland, situated on the island of Wolin in the far north-west of the country, in West Pomeranian Voivodeship. An IUCN category II protected area, it was established on 3 March 1960 and covers an area of 109.37 square kilometres (42.23 sq mi). The park has its headquarters in the town of Międzyzdroje.

The park contains a varied flora and fauna. Its attractions include the sea cliffs of Gosań and Kawcza Góra, and a wisent (European bison) sanctuary.

== Gallery ==
Logo

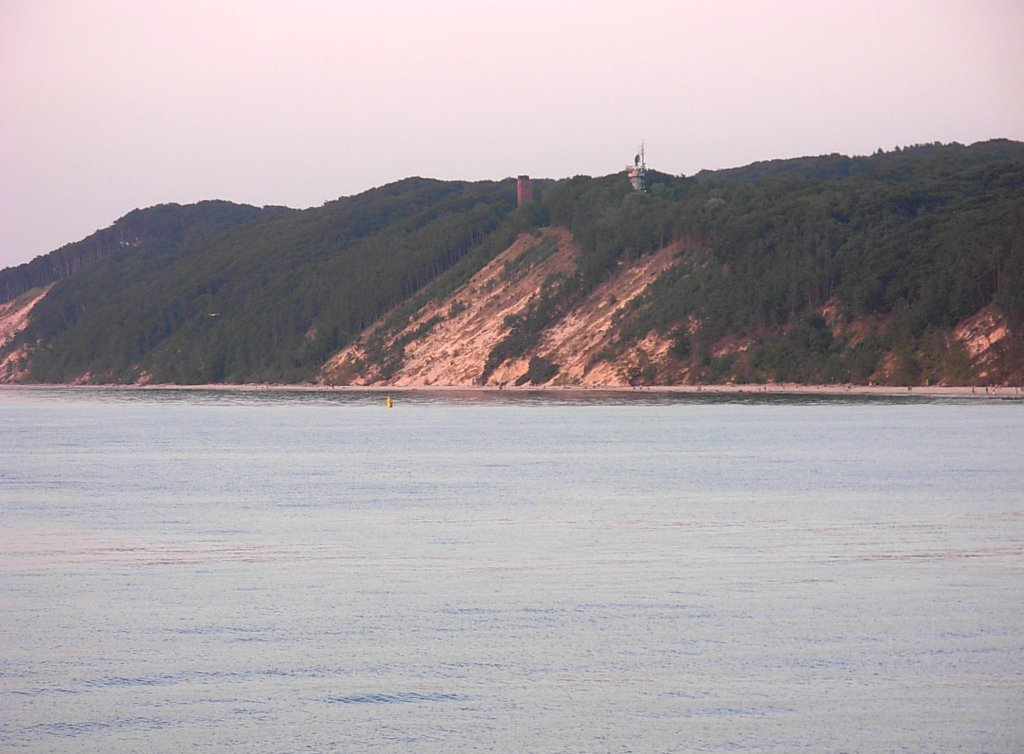
Sea cliff

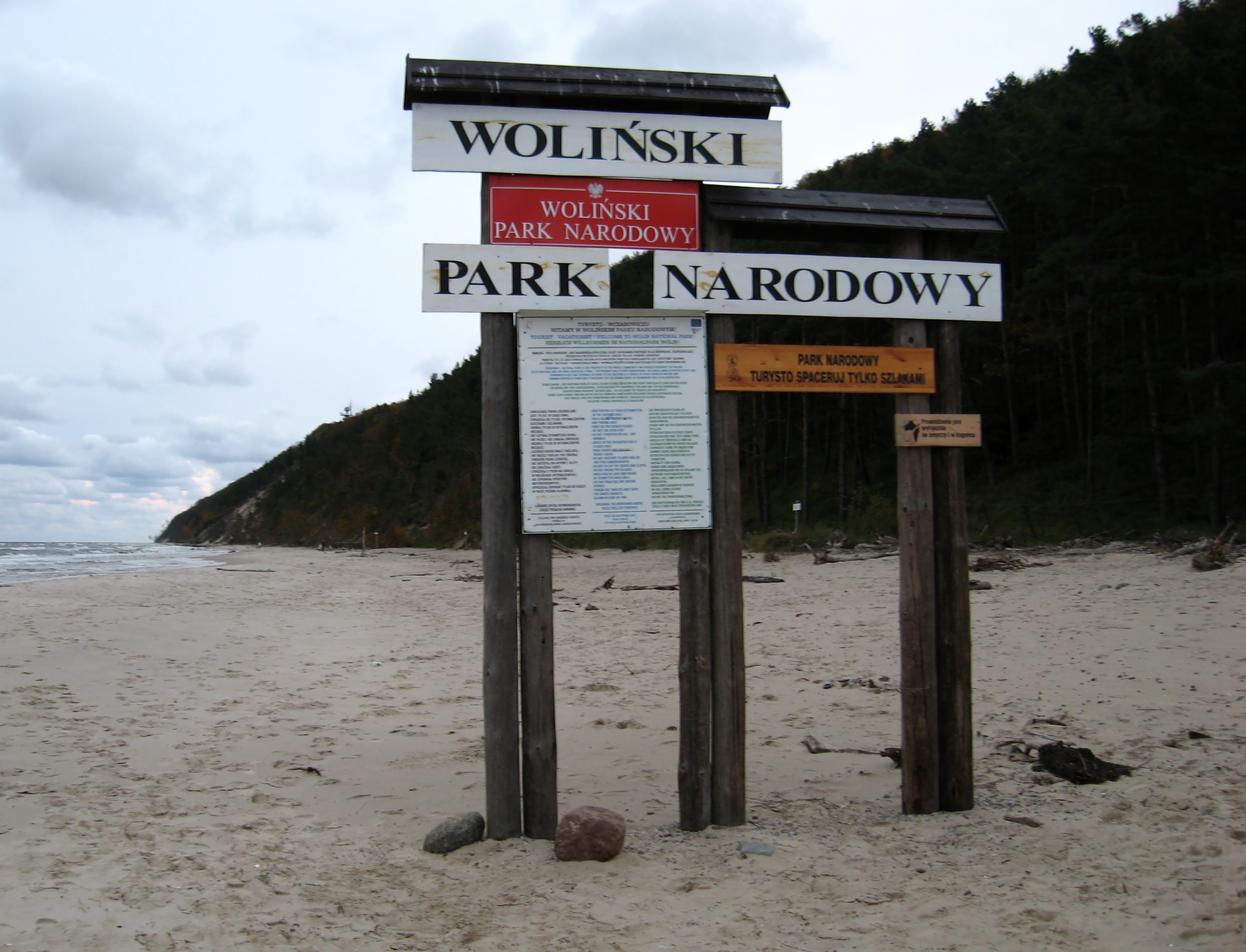
Entrance to the park at Międzyzdroje beach

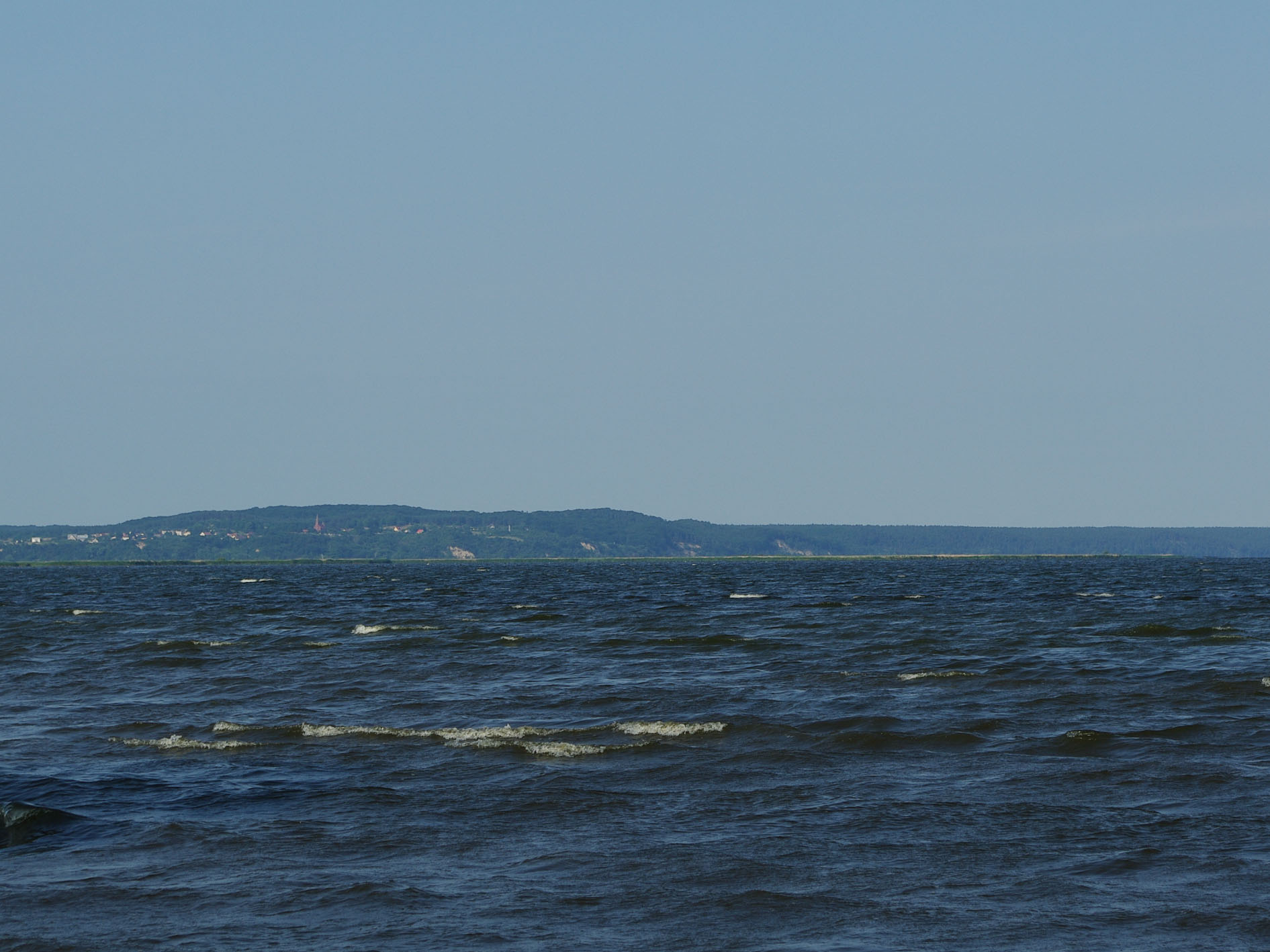
Lubin-Wapnica hills
