= Wolin =

Name both of a Polish island and a town on it

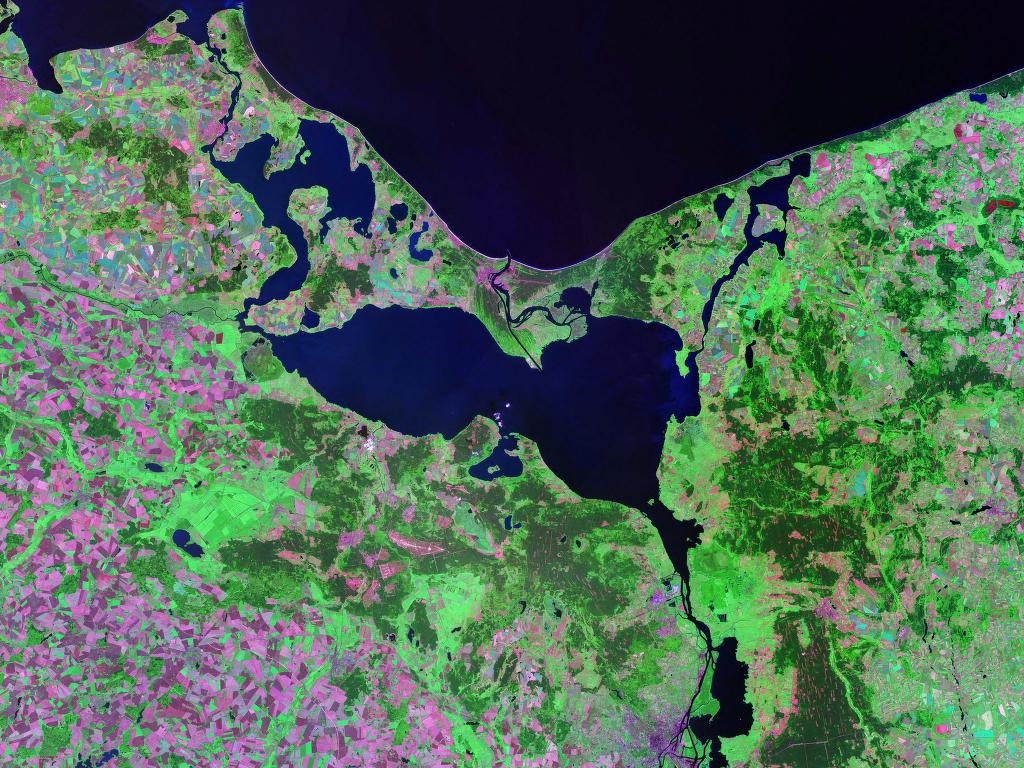
- Landsat satellite photo of Oder Lagoon - Wolin is the eastern of the two large islands separating the waters of the Lagoon from the Baltic Sea, the western island is Usedom

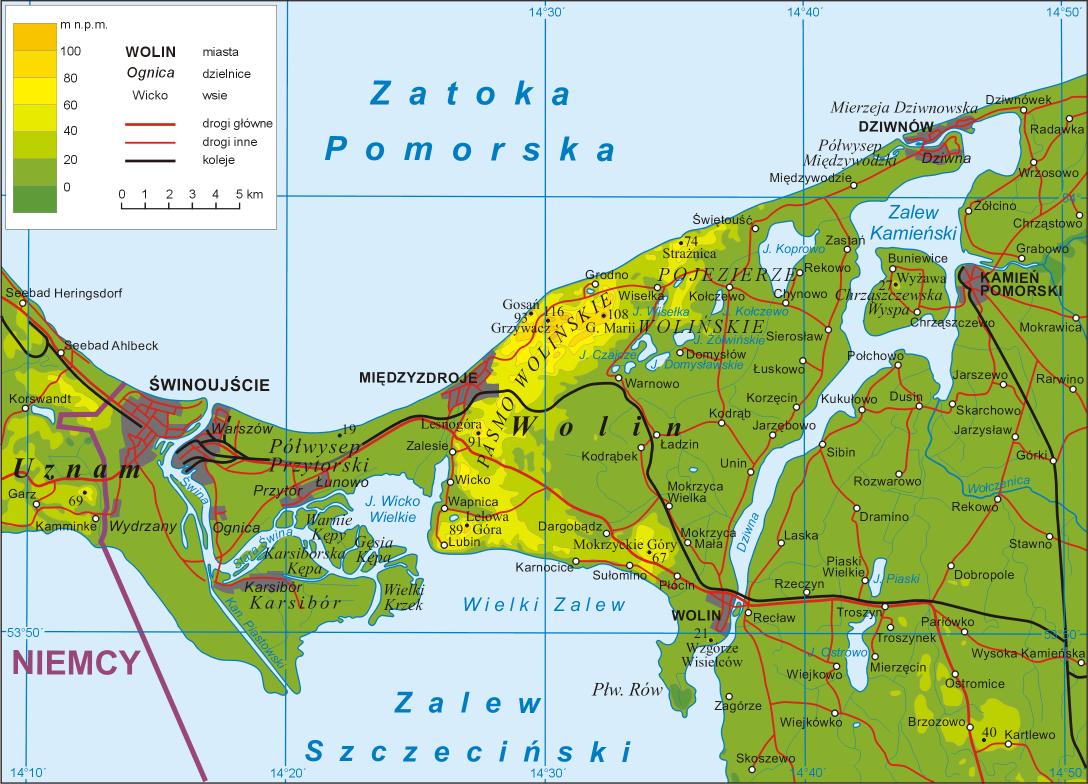
- Map of Wolin

Geography
- Location: Baltic Sea
- Coordinates: 53°55′N 14°30′E
- Area: 265 km^{2} (102 sq mi)

Administration
- Poland
- Voivodeship: West Pomeranian Voivodeship
- County: Kamień, Świnoujście
- Largest settlement: Świnoujście

Demographics
- Demonym: Wolinians
- Ethnic groups: Poles

Additional information
- Time zone: CET (UTC+1)
  - Summer (DST): CEST (UTC+2)

Wolin (Polish: [ˈvɔlin]; German: Wollin [vɔˈliːn]) is an island in the Baltic Sea, just off the Polish coast. Administratively, the island belongs to Poland's West Pomeranian Voivodeship. Wolin is separated from the island of Usedom (Uznam) by the Strait of Świna, and from mainland Pomerania by the Strait of Dziwna. The island has an area of 265 km^{2} (102 sq mi) and its highest point is Mount Grzywacz at 116 m above sea level. The number of inhabitants is 30,000. Eastern suburbs of the city of Świnoujście extend to the Wolin island, while the towns of Międzyzdroje and Wolin lie further east.

Water from the river Oder flows into the Szczecin Lagoon and from there through the Peene west of Usedom, Świna and Dziwna into the Bay of Pomerania in the Baltic Sea.

Most of the island consists of forests and postglacial hills. In the middle is the Wolin National Park. The island is the main tourist attraction of northwestern Poland, and it is crossed by several marked tourist trails, such as a 73-kilometer-long (45 mi) trail from Międzyzdroje to Dziwnówek. There is a main, electrified rail line, which connects Szczecin and Świnoujście, as well as the international road E65 (national road 3 / S3 expressway) crossing the island.

Some etymologists believe that the name is related to the name of the ancient historical region of Volhynia. The origins of the name then would come from the resettled Volynians who named the island Volyn.

== History ==
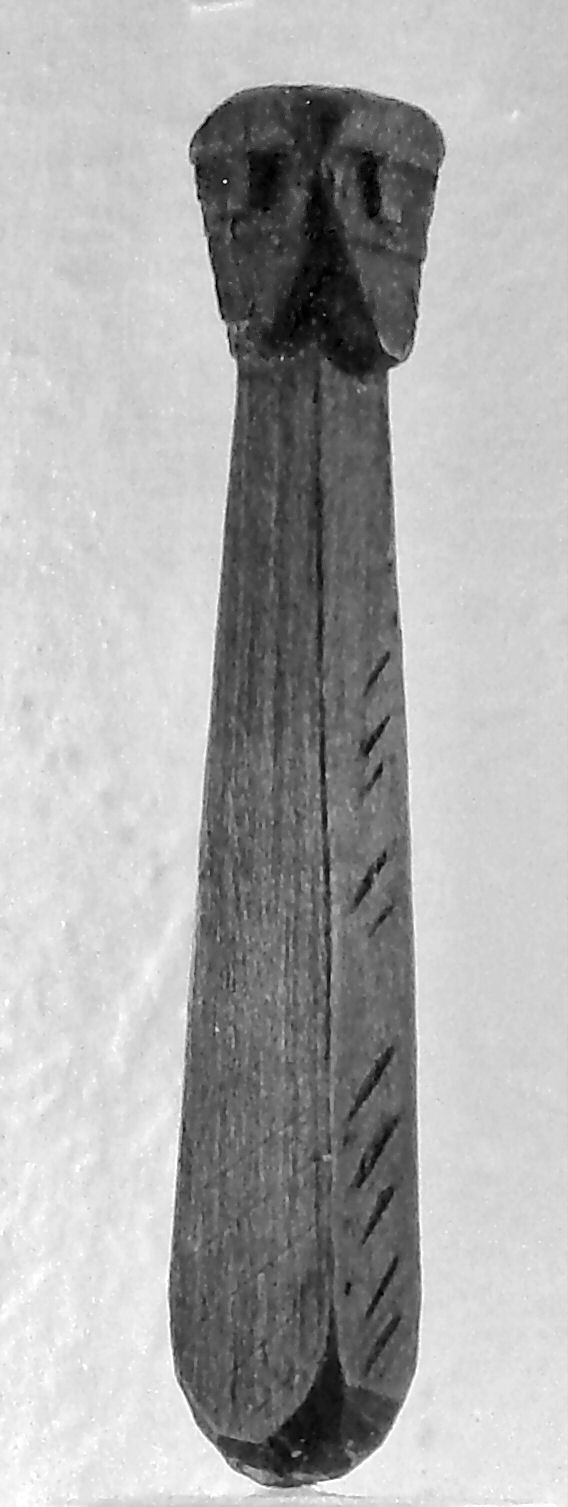
One of four Svetovid wood figures, found in Wolin, from the 9th or 10th century used in home worship

The ford across the river Dziwna on which Wolin is located has been used as far back as the Stone Age. Archaeological excavations of soil layers indicate that there was a settlement in the area during the Migration period, at the turn of the 5th and 6th centuries. The place was then abandoned for approximately one hundred years. At the end of the 8th or the beginning of the 9th century, the area was levelled and a new settlement constructed. The earliest evidence of fortifications dates to the first half of the 9th century. In the second half of the 9th century, there was a central fortified area and two suburbs, to the north and south of the center. These became enclosed and fortified between the end of the 9th and the 10th centuries.

A medieval document from the mid-9th century, called the Bavarian Geographer after its anonymous creator, mentions the Slavic tribe of Wolinians who had 70 strongholds at that time (Uelunzani civitates LXX). The town of Wolin was first mentioned in 965, by Ibrahim ibn Jakub, who referred to the place as Weltaba.

The period of greatest development during the medieval period was between the 9th and the 11th centuries. Around 896 AD a new port was constructed and the main part of the town acquired new, stronger fortifications, including a wooden palisade made of halved 50-centimetre wide tree trunks, a rampart and a retaining wall.

Archaeologists believe that in the Early Middle Ages Wolin was a great trade emporium, spreading along the shore for four kilometres and rivalling in importance Birka and Hedeby.

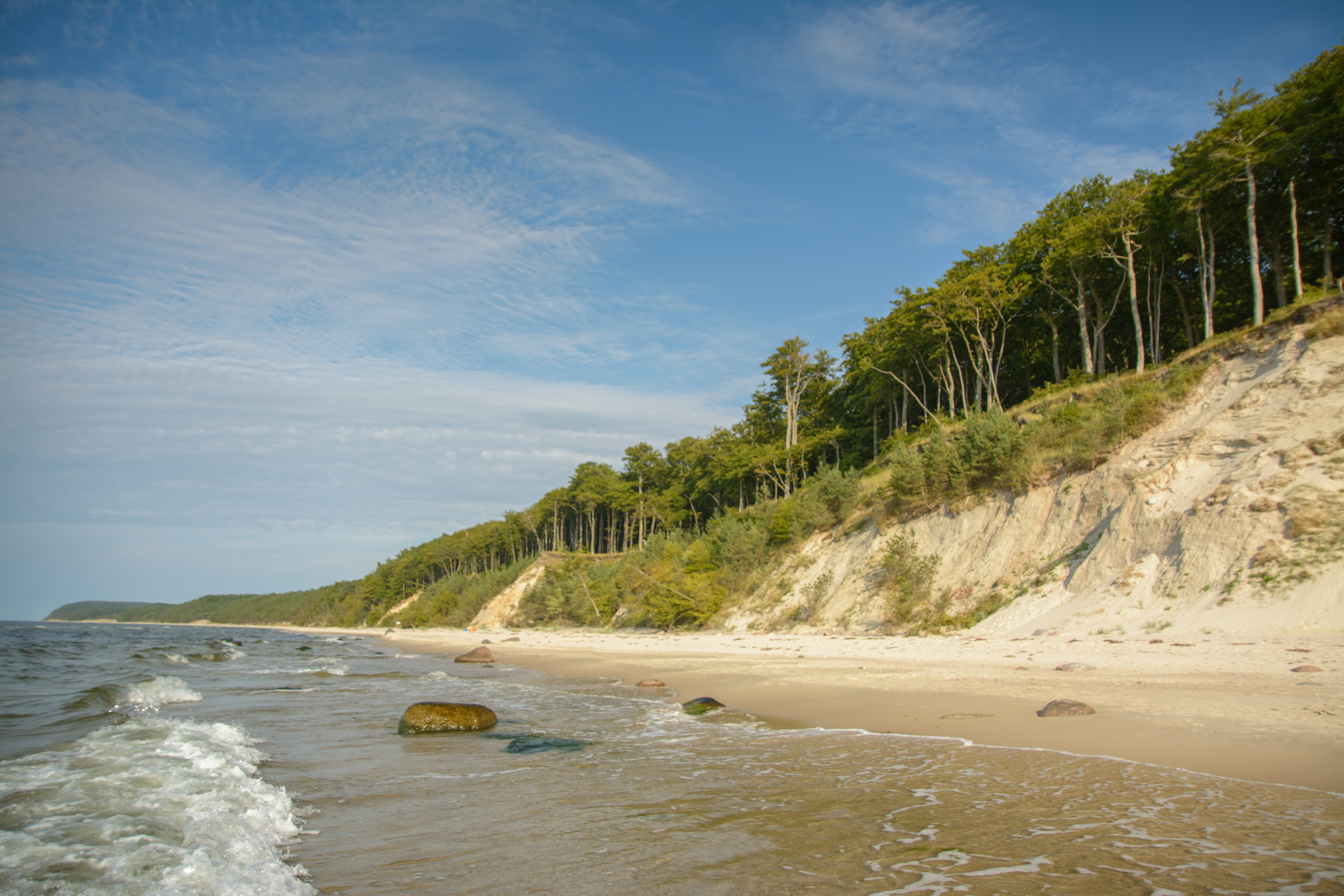
Wolin National Park on the island

In 967, the island became controlled by Poland, under the country's first historic ruler, Duke Mieszko I. However, it has not been established if Wolin became directly part of Poland, or if it was a fief. Mieszko I encompassed the town of Wolin with defensive ramparts. Polish influences were not firm and they ended around 1007. In the following years, Wolin became famous for its pirates, who would plunder ships cruising the Baltic. As a reprisal, in 1043 it was attacked by the Norwegian king Magnus the Good.

In the early 12th century, the island, as part of the Pomeranian duchy, was captured by the Polish monarch Boleslaw III Wrymouth. Shortly after, the inhabitants of Wolin accepted Christianity, and in 1140 pope Innocent II created a diocese there, with its capital in the town of Wolin. In 1170, the battle at Julin Bridge took place there. In 1185 the dukes of Pomerania became vassals of Denmark, and in 1227, they fell under suzerainty of the Holy Roman Empire.

In 1535, like the vast majority of the northern German-speaking world, Wolin accepted Protestant Lutheranism. In 1630, during the Thirty Years' War, the island was captured by Sweden. It passed to the Kingdom of Prussia in 1720 as a result of the Treaty of Stockholm. From 1871, the island was part of the German Empire. During this period the Batlic coastal city of Misdroy (Międzyzdroje) developed into a nice sea side resort entertaining tourists from Berlin. Outside tourism, the island's population relied mainly on cattle farming, forestry, and Baltic Sea fishing. During World War II, in February 1945, a German-perpetrated death march of Allied prisoners-of-war from the Stalag XX-B POW camp passed through the island. After Nazi Germany's defeat in the war, via the Potsdam Protocol, it became again part of Poland. The entire native German-speaking Pomeranian population on the island was expelled to the west and replaced by Polish settlers. This was done with official approval from the Allied Powers, regardless of the fact that the region was historically Polish only during two brief medieval periods prior to 1945.

In 1949–1950, a military hospital was based on the island, in which some 2,000 wounded or ill Greeks and Macedonians, partisans and refugees of the Greek Civil War, were treated by the Poles.

In 2015, the Świnoujście LNG terminal was opened.

=== Connection with Jomsborg and Vineta ===
Archaeological finds on the island are not very rich but they dot an area of 20 hectares, making it the second largest Baltic marketplace of the Viking Age after Hedeby. Some scholars have speculated that Wolin may have been the basis for the semi-legendary settlements Jomsborg and Vineta. However, others have rejected the identification, or even the historical existence of Jomsborg and Vineta (for example, Gerard Labuda).

Gwyn Jones notes that the size of the town was exaggerated in contemporary sources, for example by Adam of Bremen who claimed Wolin/Jomsborg was "the largest town in Europe". Archaeological excavations, however, have found no evidence of a harbor big enough for 360 warships (as claimed by Adam) or of a major citadel. The town was inhabited by both Slavs and Scandinavians.

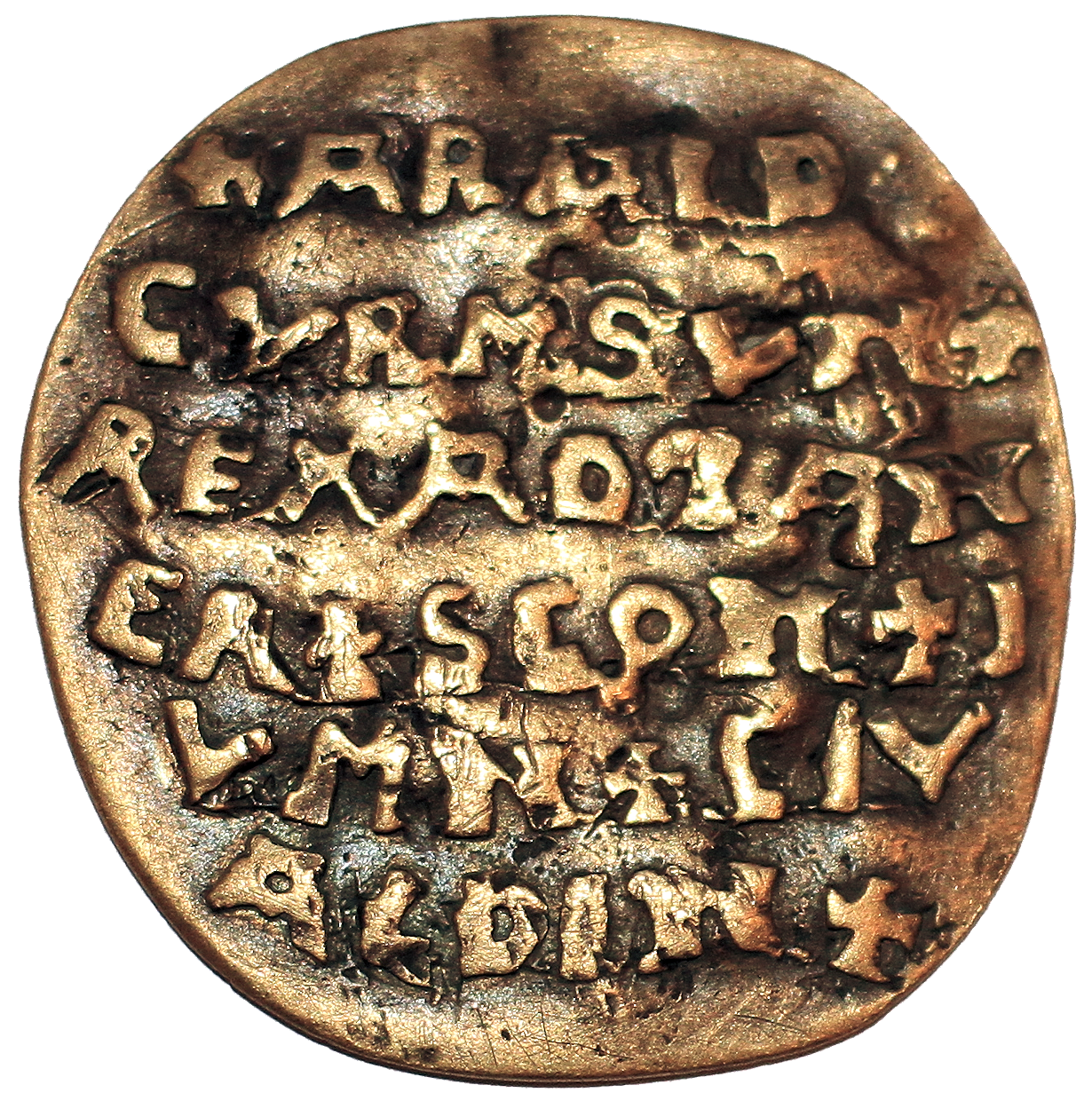
Curmsun Disc - obverse

A golden disc bearing the name of Harald Bluetooth and Jomsborg appeared in Sweden in autumn 2014. The disc, also called the Curmsun Disc, is made of high gold content and has a weight of 25,23 gram. On the obverse there is a Latin inscription and on the reverse there is a Latin cross with four dots surrounded by an octagonal ridge. The inscription reads: "+ARALD CVRMSVN+REX AD TANER+SCON+JVMN+CIV ALDIN+" and translates as "Harald Gormsson king of Danes, Scania, Jomsborg, town Aldinburg".

It is assumed that the disc was a part of a Viking hoard found in 1840 in the Polish village Wiejkowo near the town of Wolin by Heinrich Boldt, the maternal great-great-grandfather of Hollywood actors and producers Ben Affleck and Casey Affleck.

The disc was rediscovered in 2014 by an eleven year old schoolgirl who found it in an old casket and then brought it to school.

== Sights ==
Among the natural, historic and tourist sights of Wolin are:

- Wolin National Park
- Świnoujście Lighthouse, one of the tallest lighthouses in the world, the tallest lighthouse in Poland, and tallest brick lighthouse in the world
- the town of Międzyzdroje with its beach, pier, Nature Museum of the Wolin National Park, wax museum, Walk of Fame (Promenada Gwiazd), Baltic Miniature Park (Bałtycki Park Miniatur), and spa park with the monument of Fryderyk Chopin
- Gothic Saint Nicholas church in Wolin
- Regional Museum in Wolin
- Gerhard's Fort of Świnoujście Fortress with the Coastal Defense Museum (Muzeum Obrony Wybrzeża) in Świnoujście
- Medieval stronghold and viewing point in Lubin
- Miniature park in Dziwnów
- Beach in Międzywodzie
- Łuniewo nature reserve
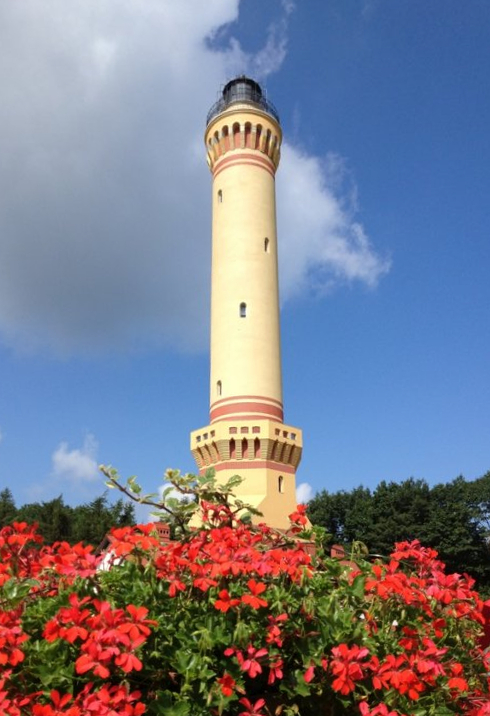
Świnoujście Lighthouse

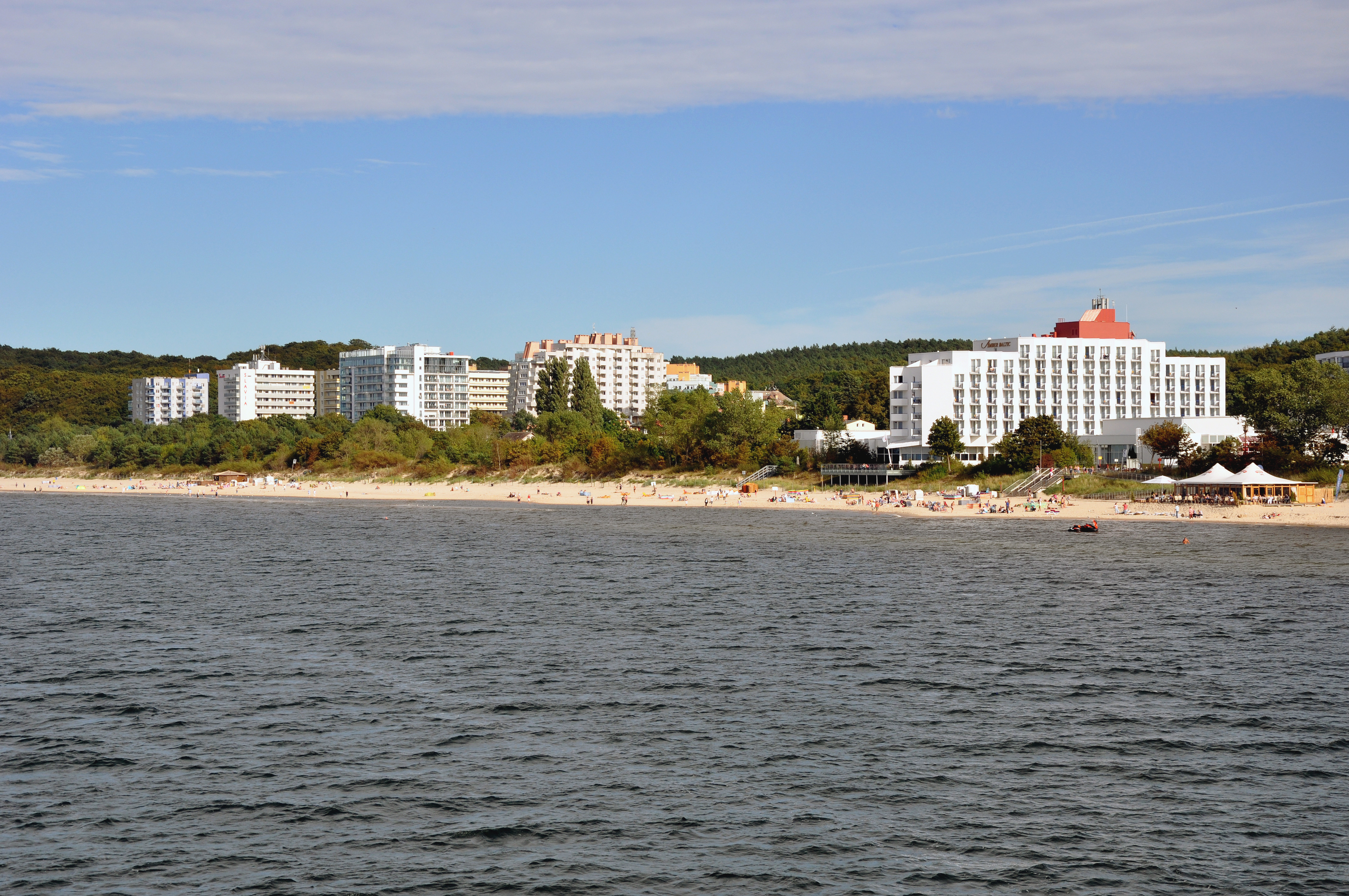
Międzyzdroje beach

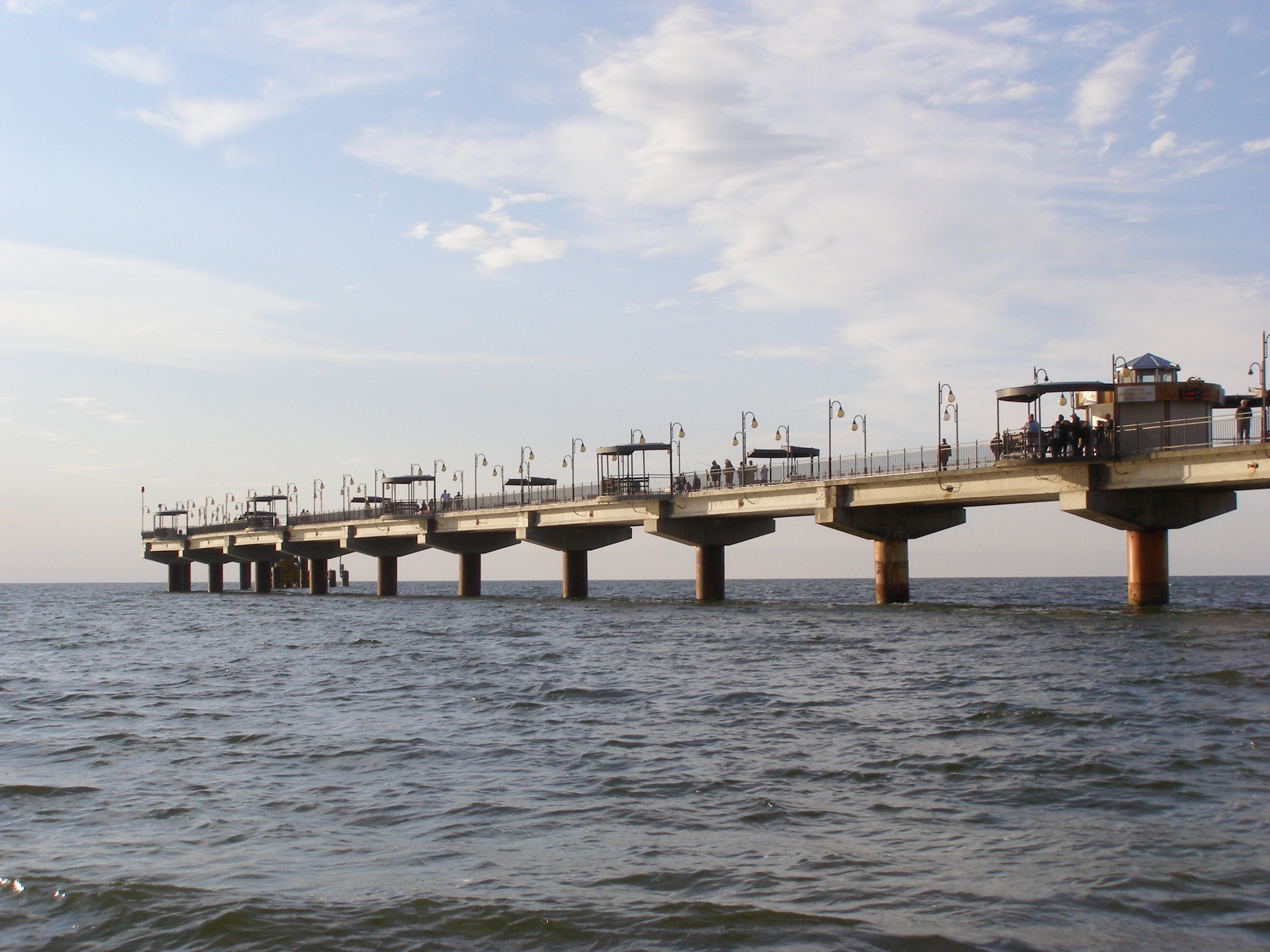
Międzyzdroje Pier

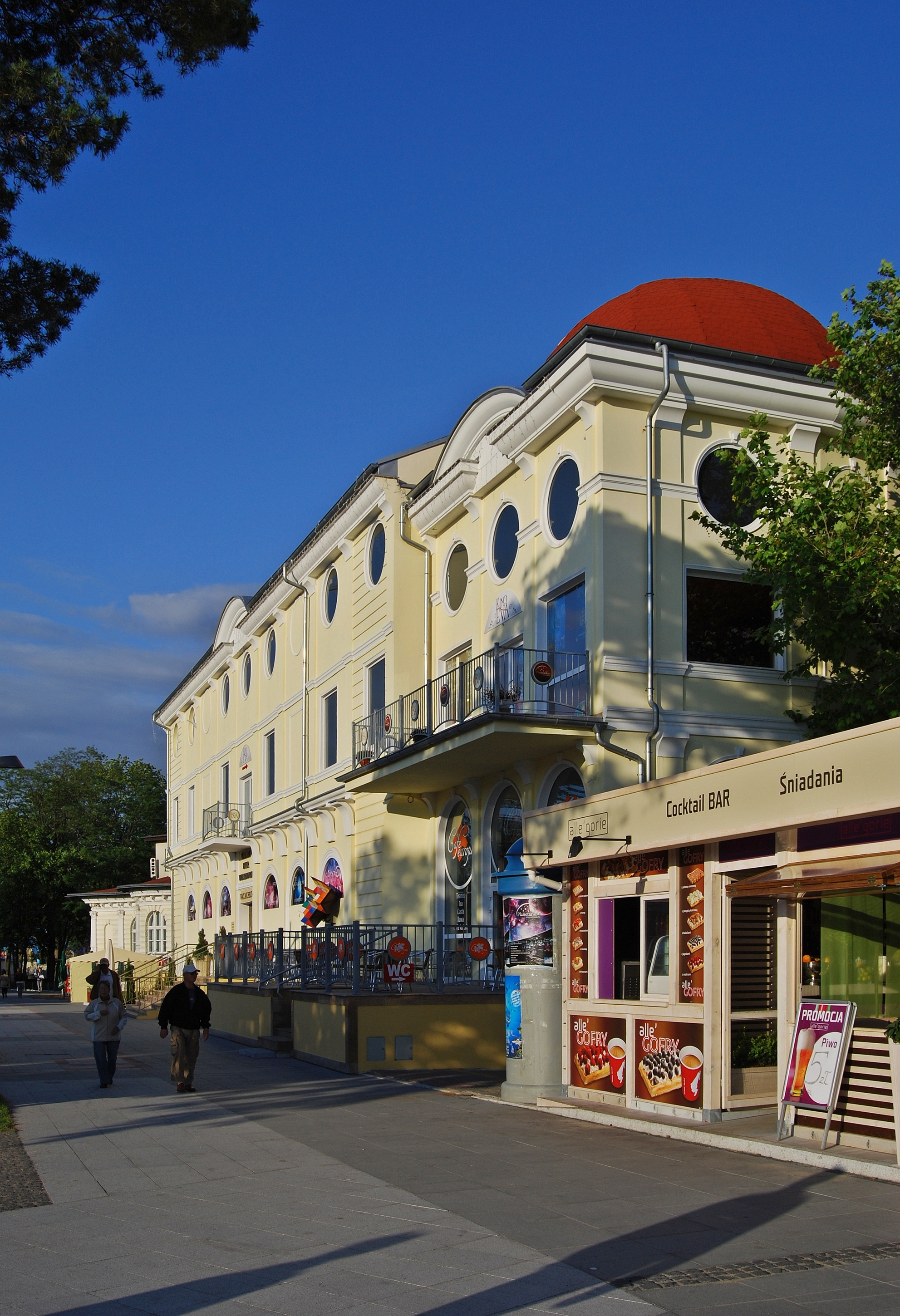
Wax museum in Międzyzdroje

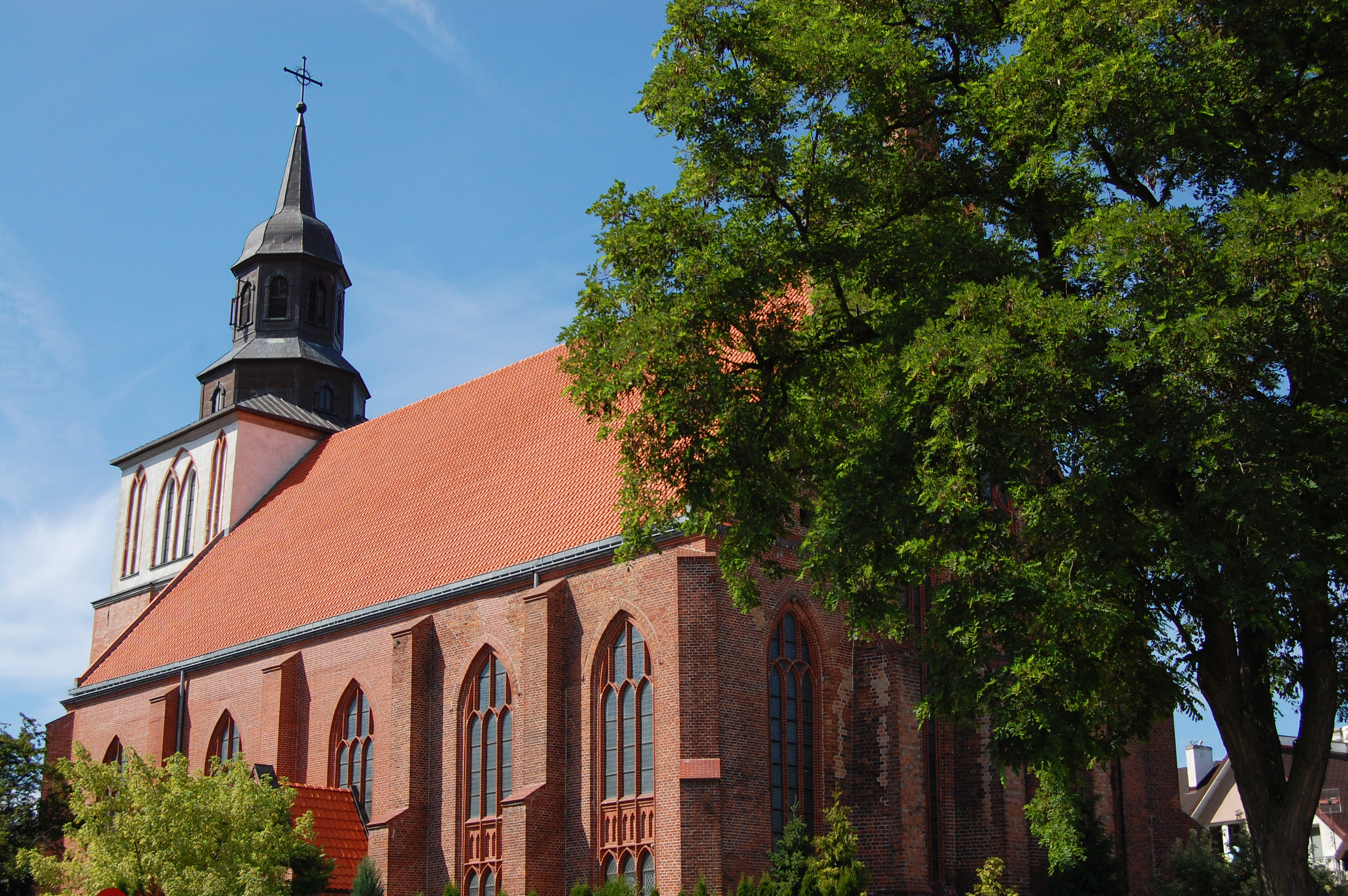
Saint Nicholas church in Wolin

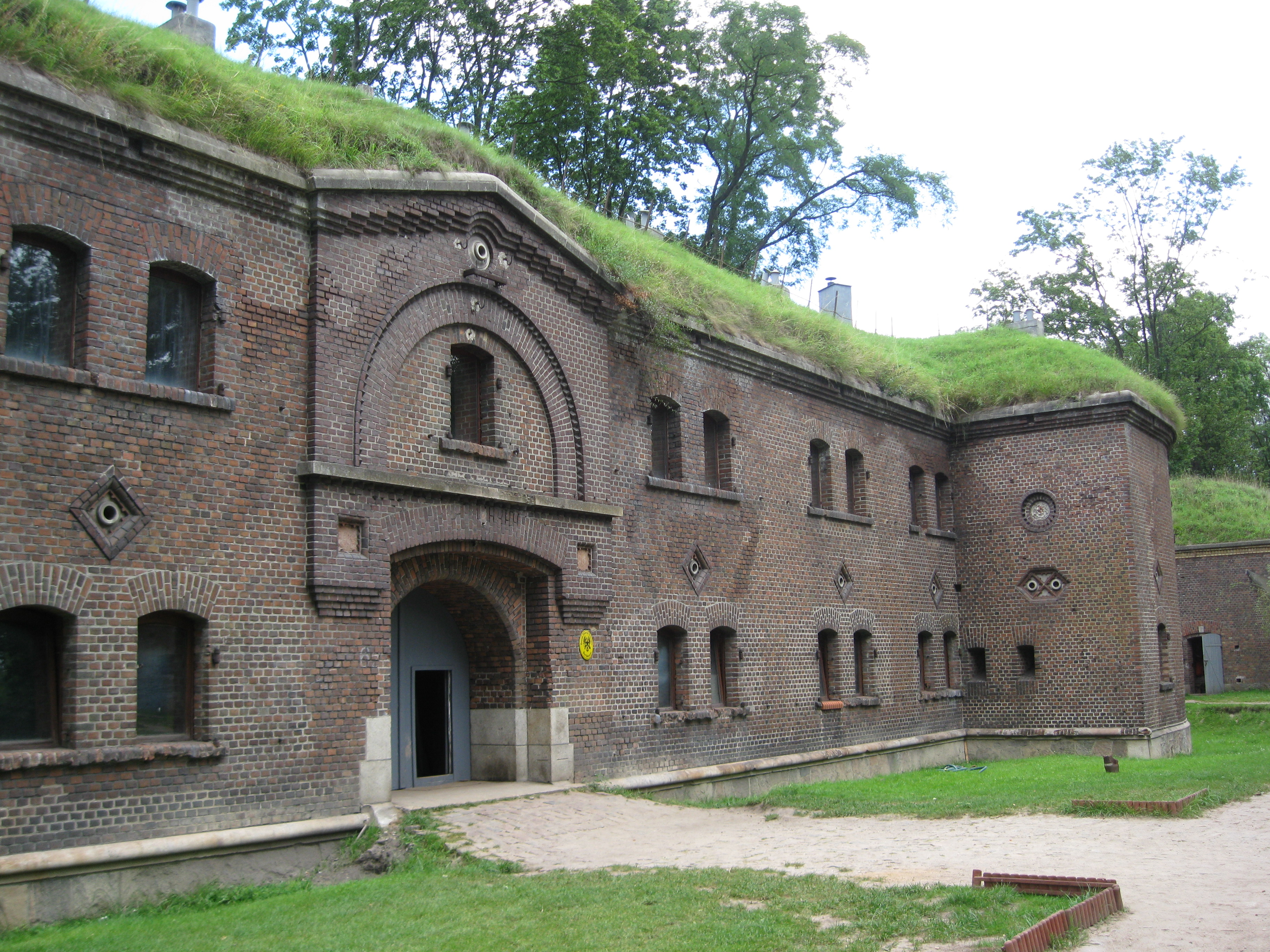
Gerhard's Fort in Świnoujście

== Culture ==
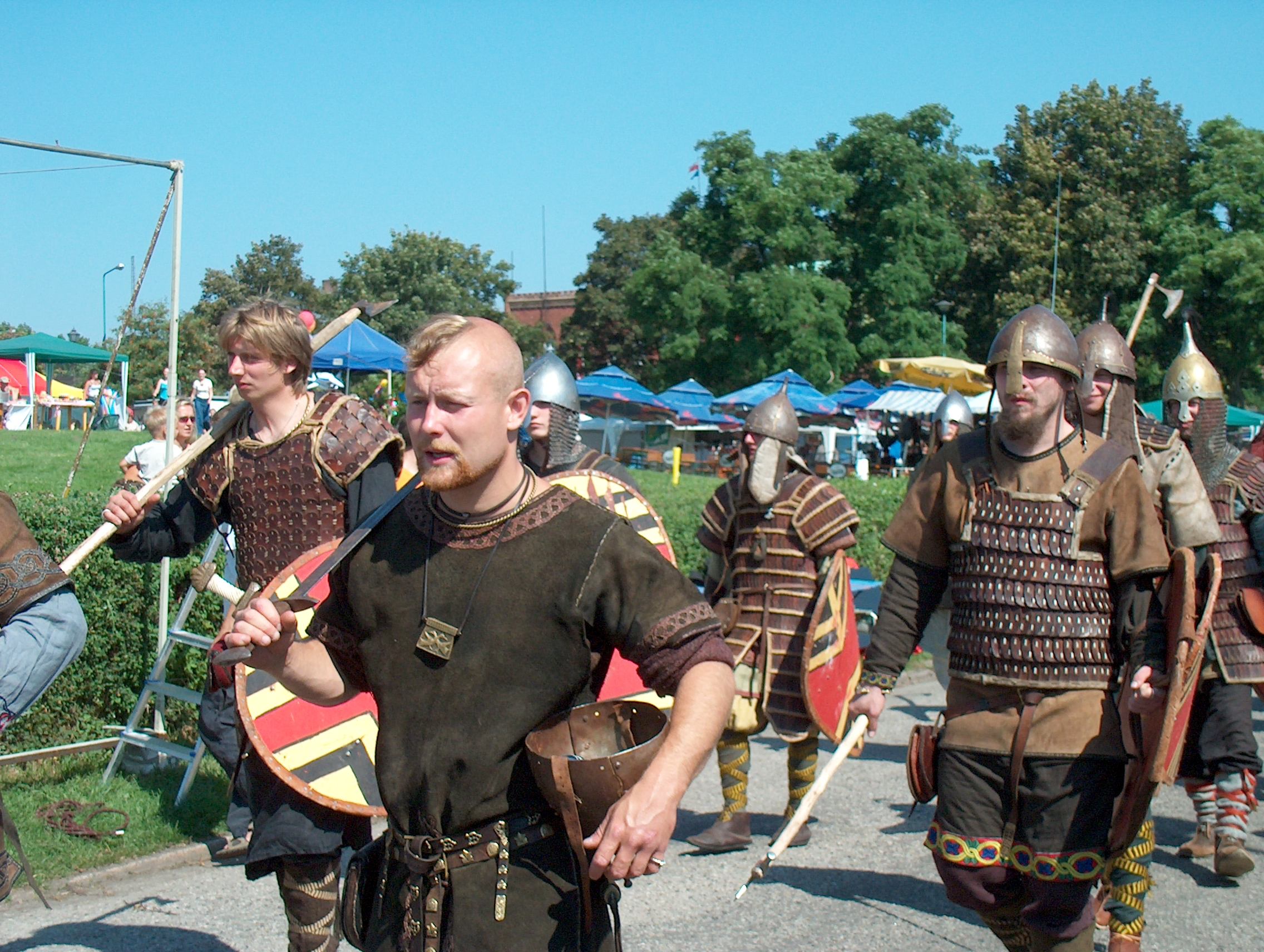
Opening parade at Viking and Slavic Festival in 2004

Annually, the island is home to Europe's biggest Germanic-Slavic Viking festival.

The officially protected traditional alcoholic beverage of Wolin is Trójniak woliński leśny (as designated by the Ministry of Agriculture and Rural Development of Poland). It is a type of local Polish mead of 12-14% alcohol by volume.

== Places on Wolin ==
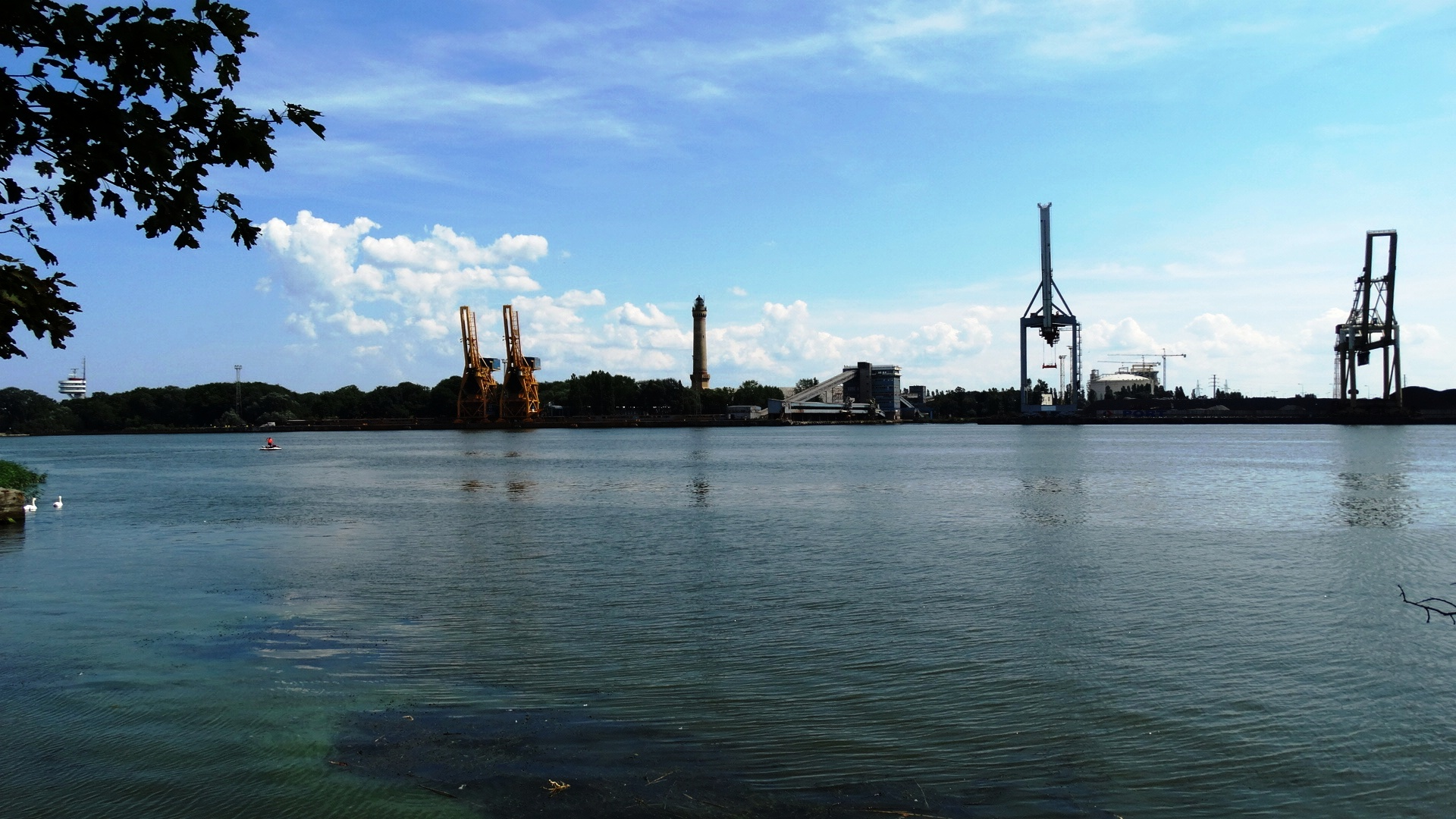
Świnoujście, eastern part, located on Wolin

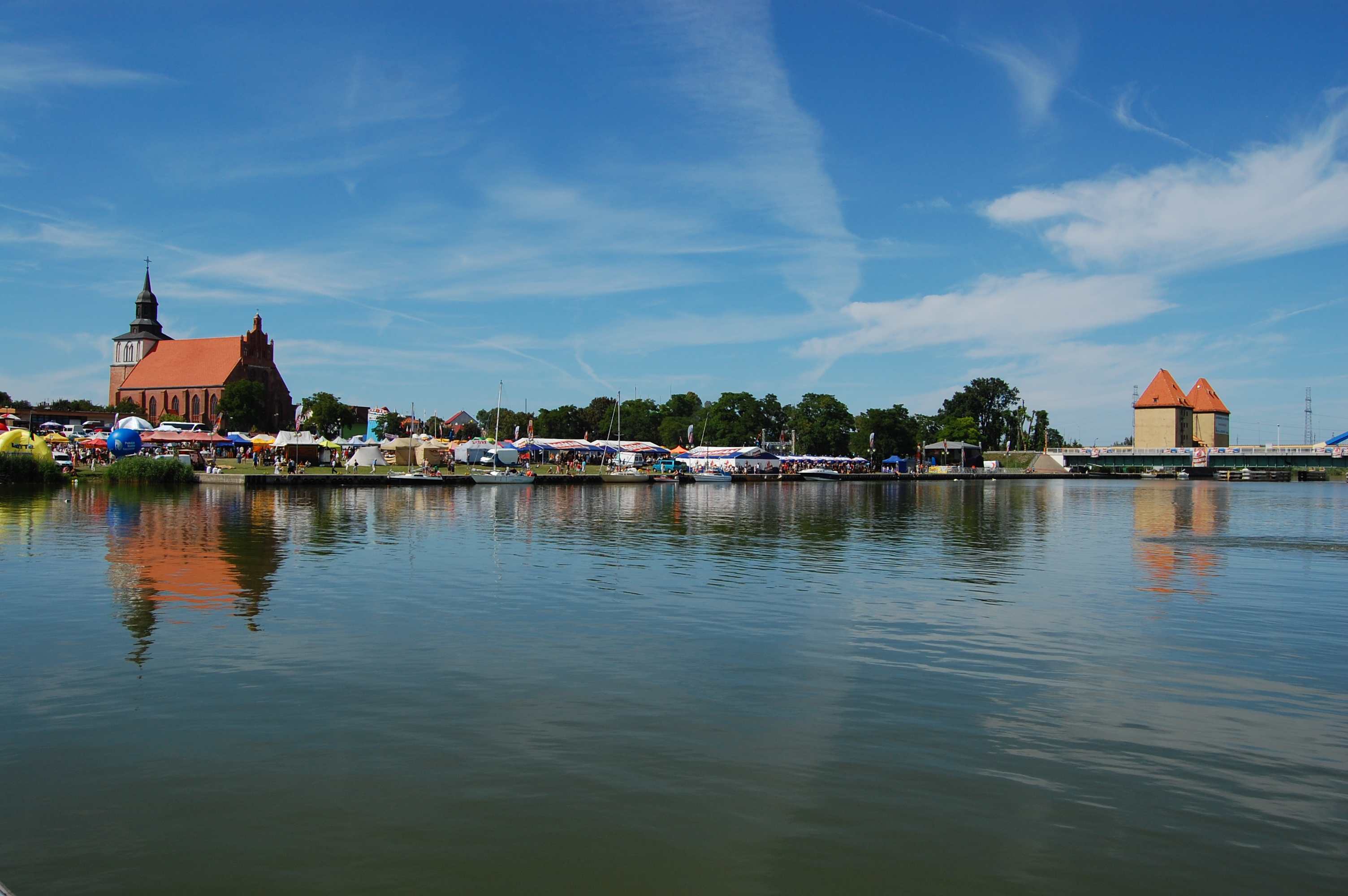
Wolin (town)

=== Towns ===
- Dziwnów
- Międzyzdroje
- Świnoujście
- Wolin

=== Villages ===
- Chynowo
- Dargobądz
- Darzowice
- Domysłów
- Jarzębowo
- Karnocice
- Kodrąb
- Kodrąbek
- Kołczewo
- Korzęcin
- Lubin
- Ładzin
- Łuskowo
- Międzywodzie
- Mokrzyca Mała
- Mokrzyca Wielka
- Płocin
- Rabiąż
- Rekowo
- Sierosław
- Sułomino
- Świętouść
- Wapnica
- Warnowo
- Wicko
- Wisełka
- Unin
- Zastań
- Żółwino

== Transport ==
Polish National roads 3 and 93, and Voivodeship road 102, pass through the island. The Solidarity Szczecin–Goleniów Airport is located approximately 60 km from the island.

In 2023, the underwater Świnoujście Tunnel connecting the islands of Wolin and Usedom was officially opened. The project cost EUR 191 million constitutes the only fixed link between two parts of the city and between the rest of country.

== Economy ==
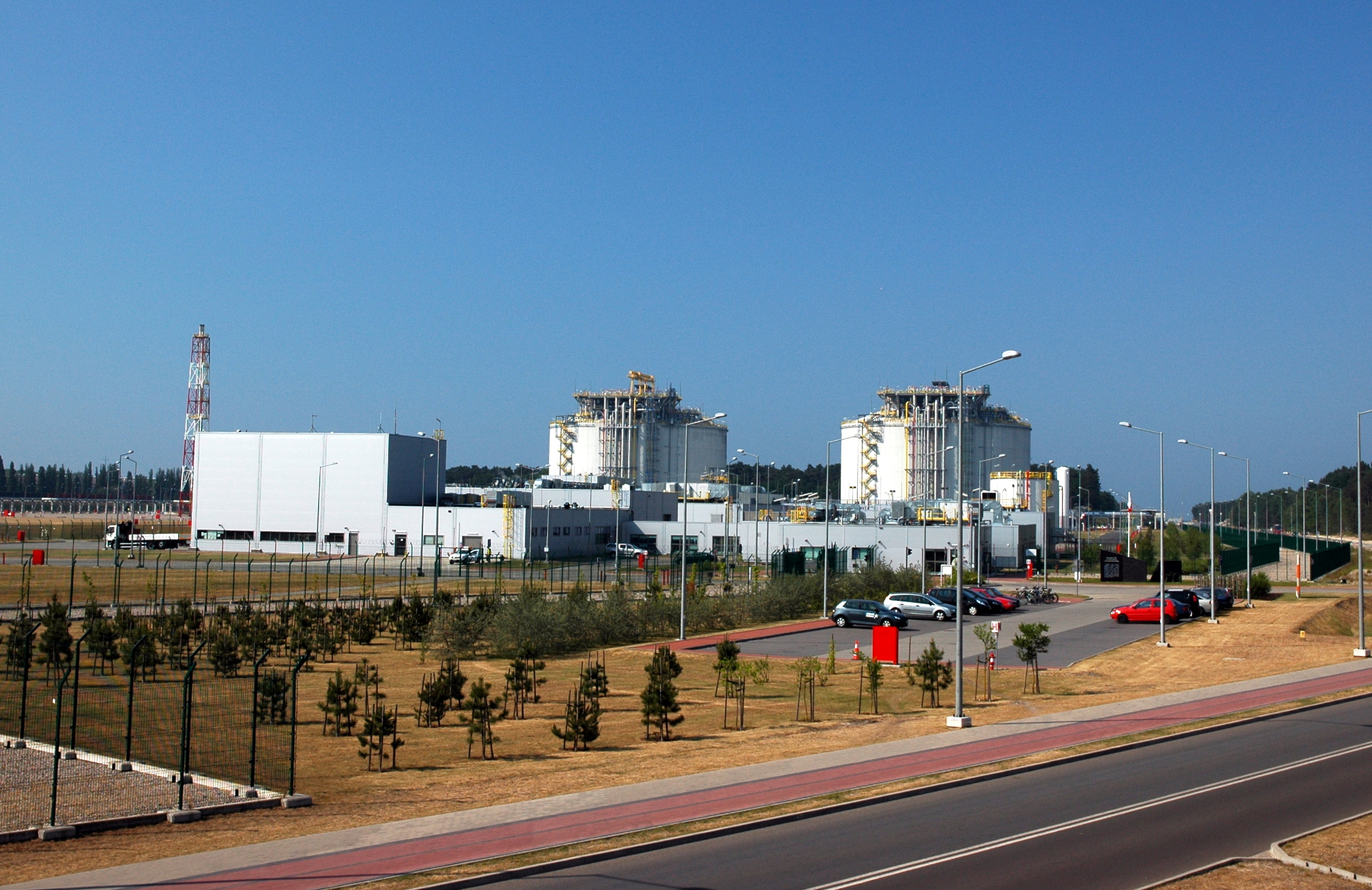
Świnoujście LNG terminal

The Świnoujście LNG terminal is located on the island.

== See also ==
- Curmsun Disc
- Jomsborg
- Jomsvikings
- Wolin Svetovit
