= Lesser Poland =

Historical region of Poland

Lesser Poland Małopolska
- Historical region
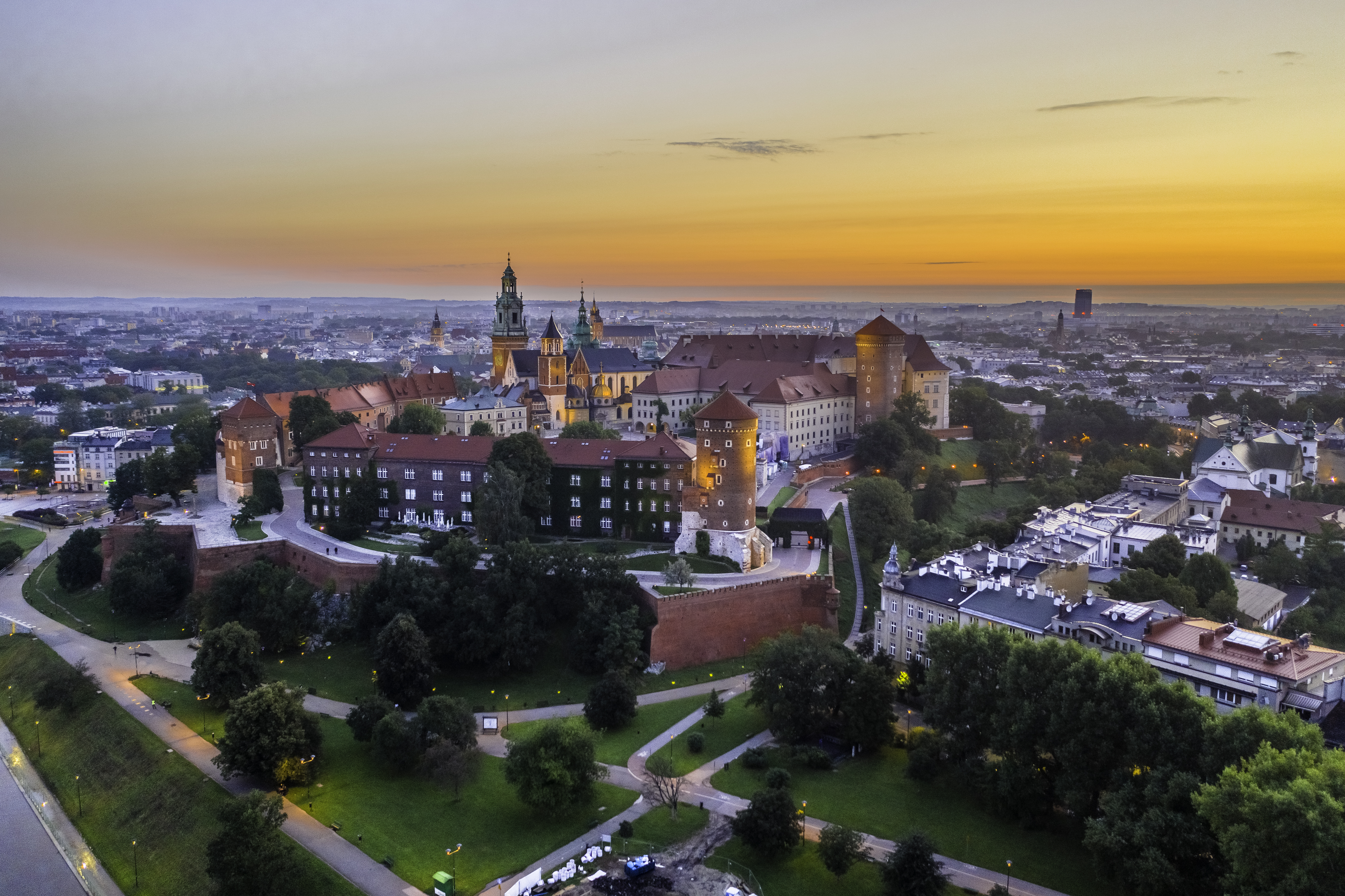
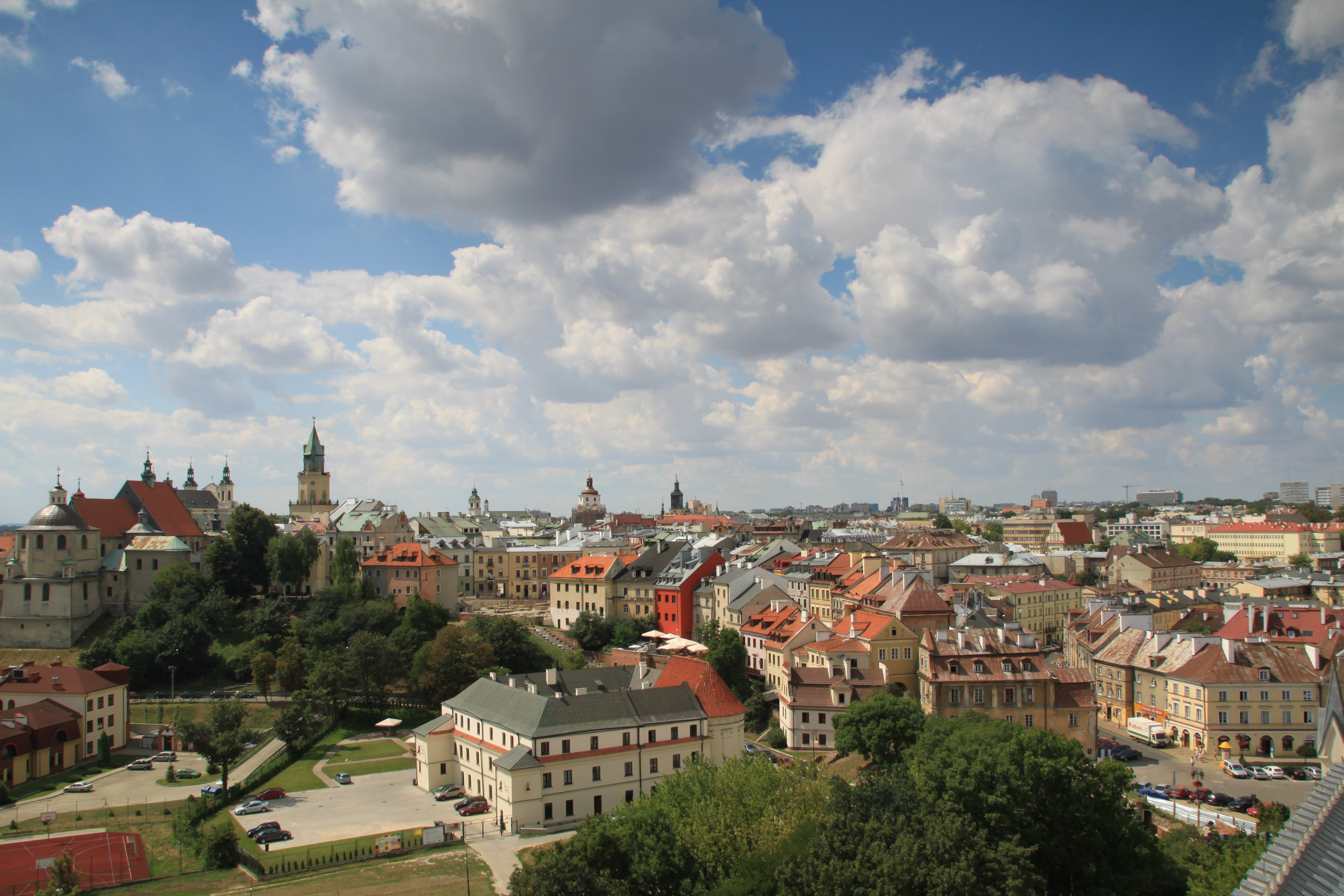
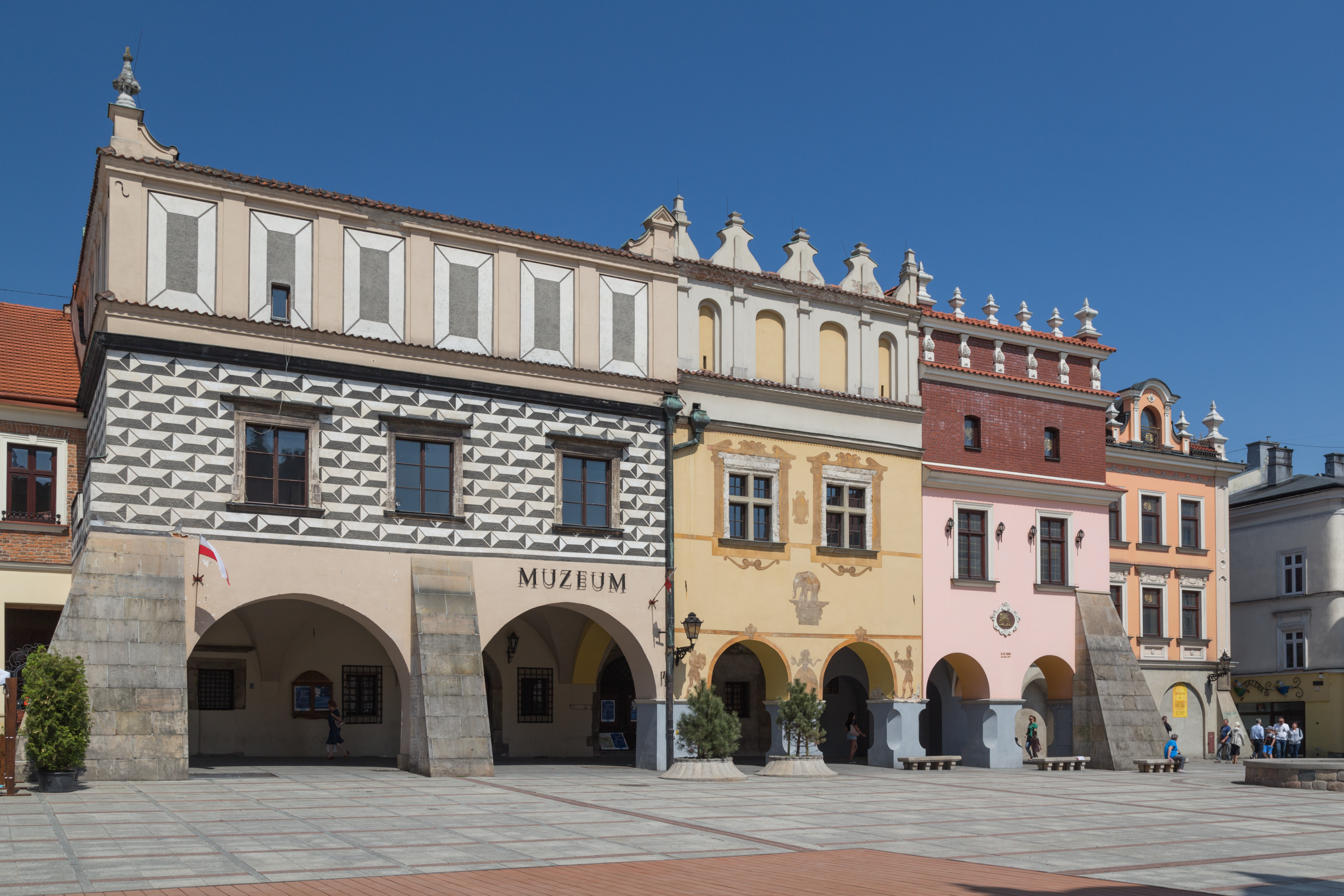
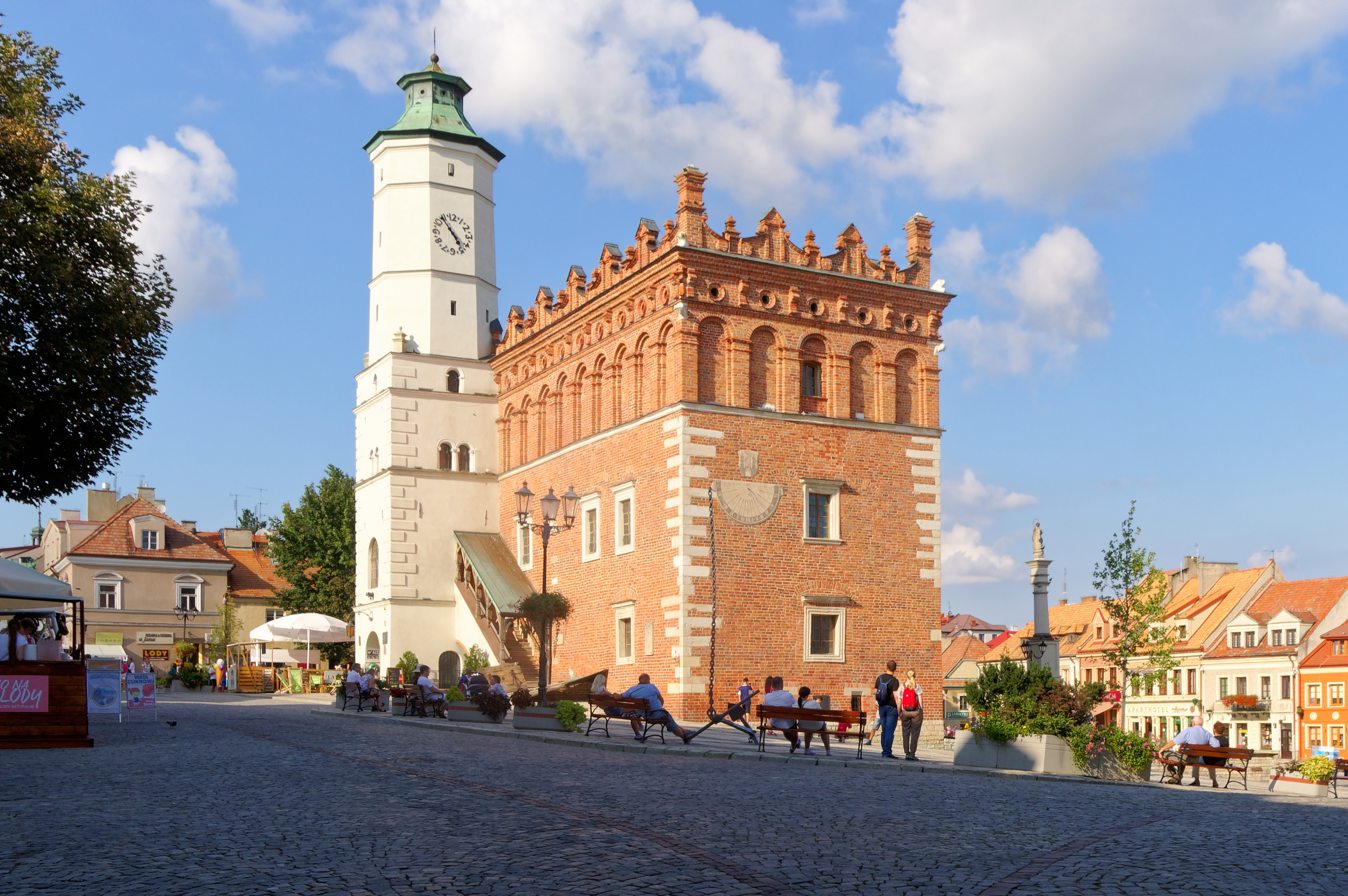
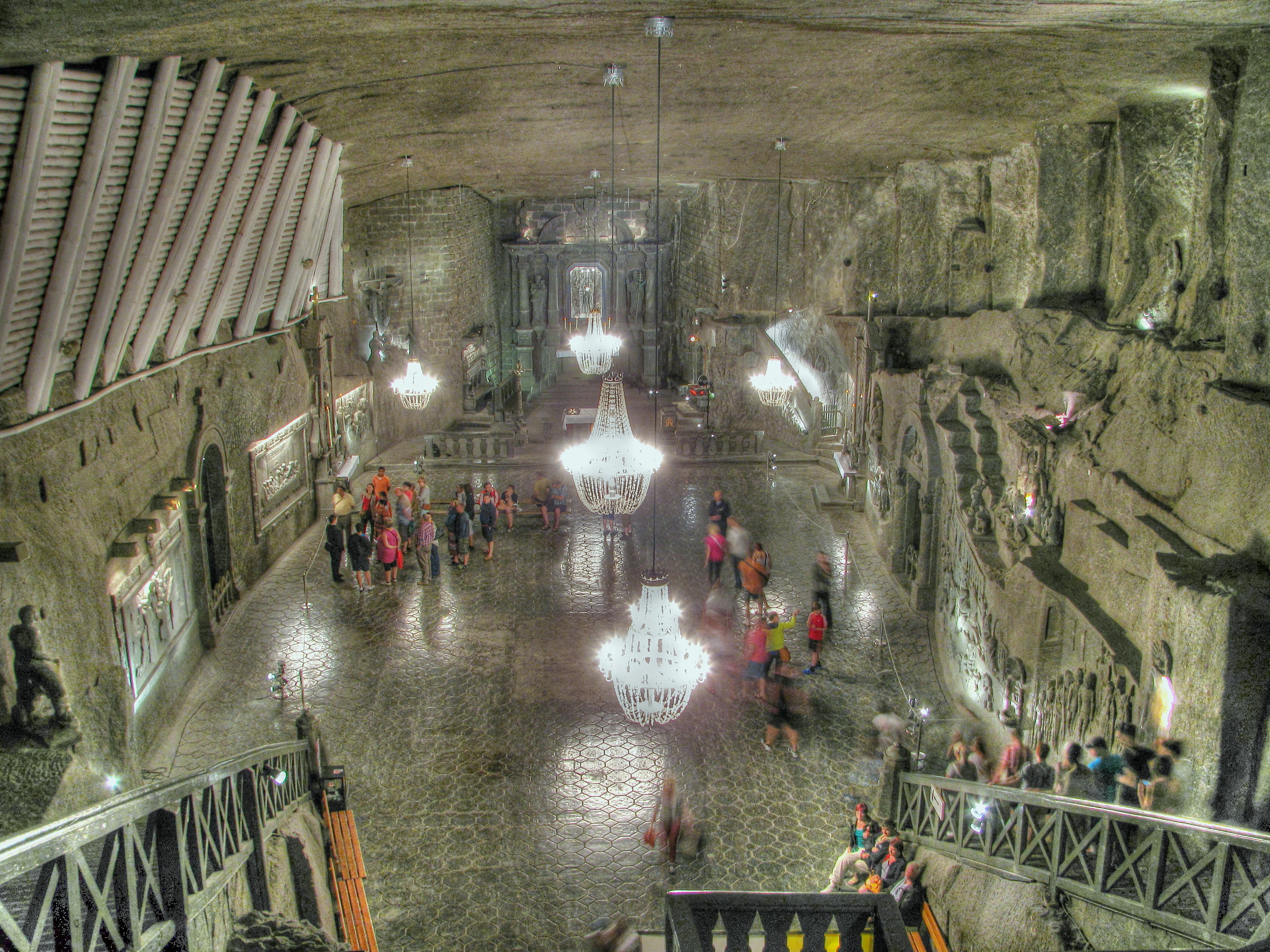
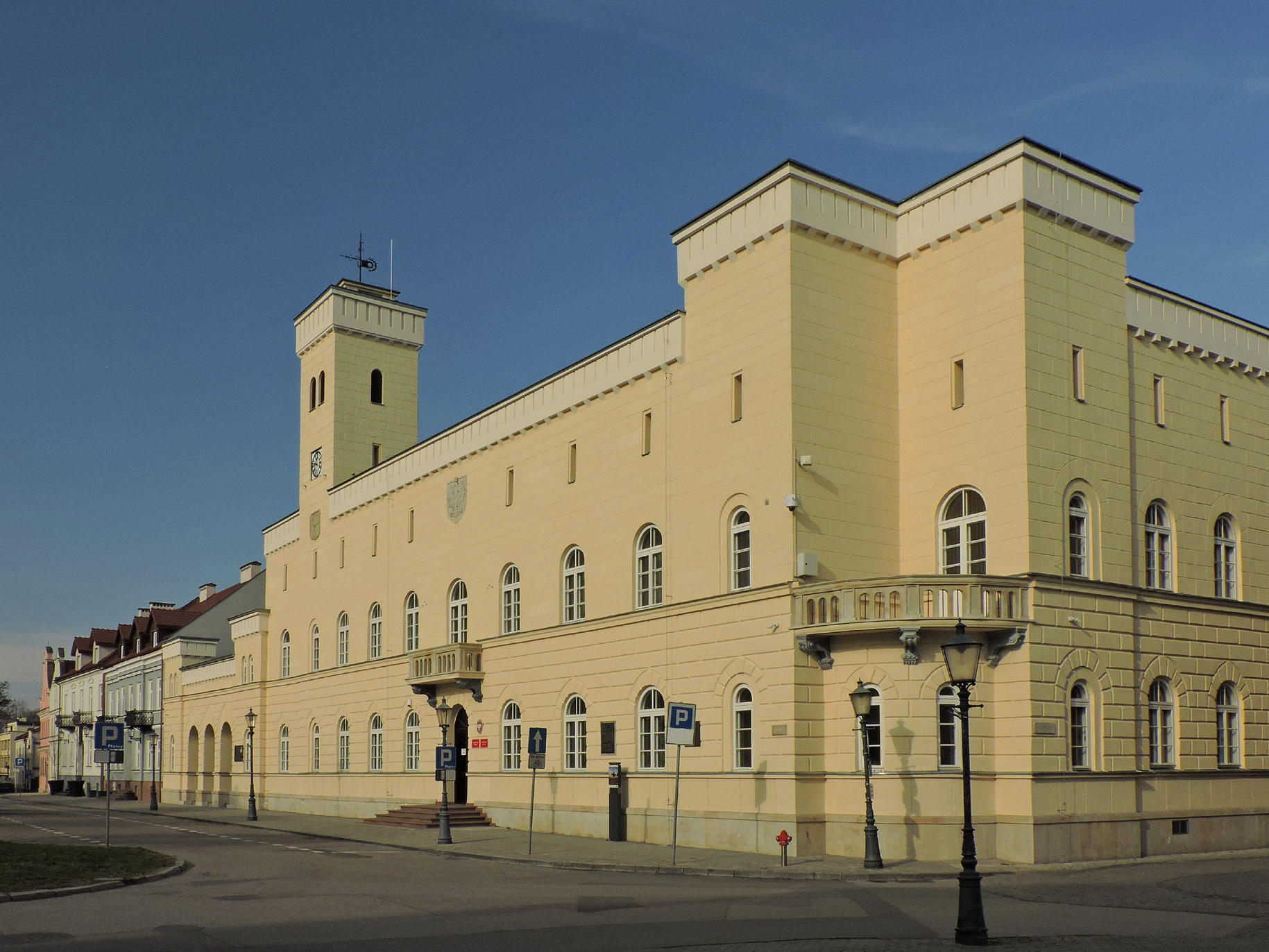
- Wawel Castle in Kraków Lublin Old Town Market Square in Tarnów Sandomierz Town Hall Wieliczka Salt Mine Radom City Hall

- Sandomierz, Kraków and Lublin lands Coat of arms

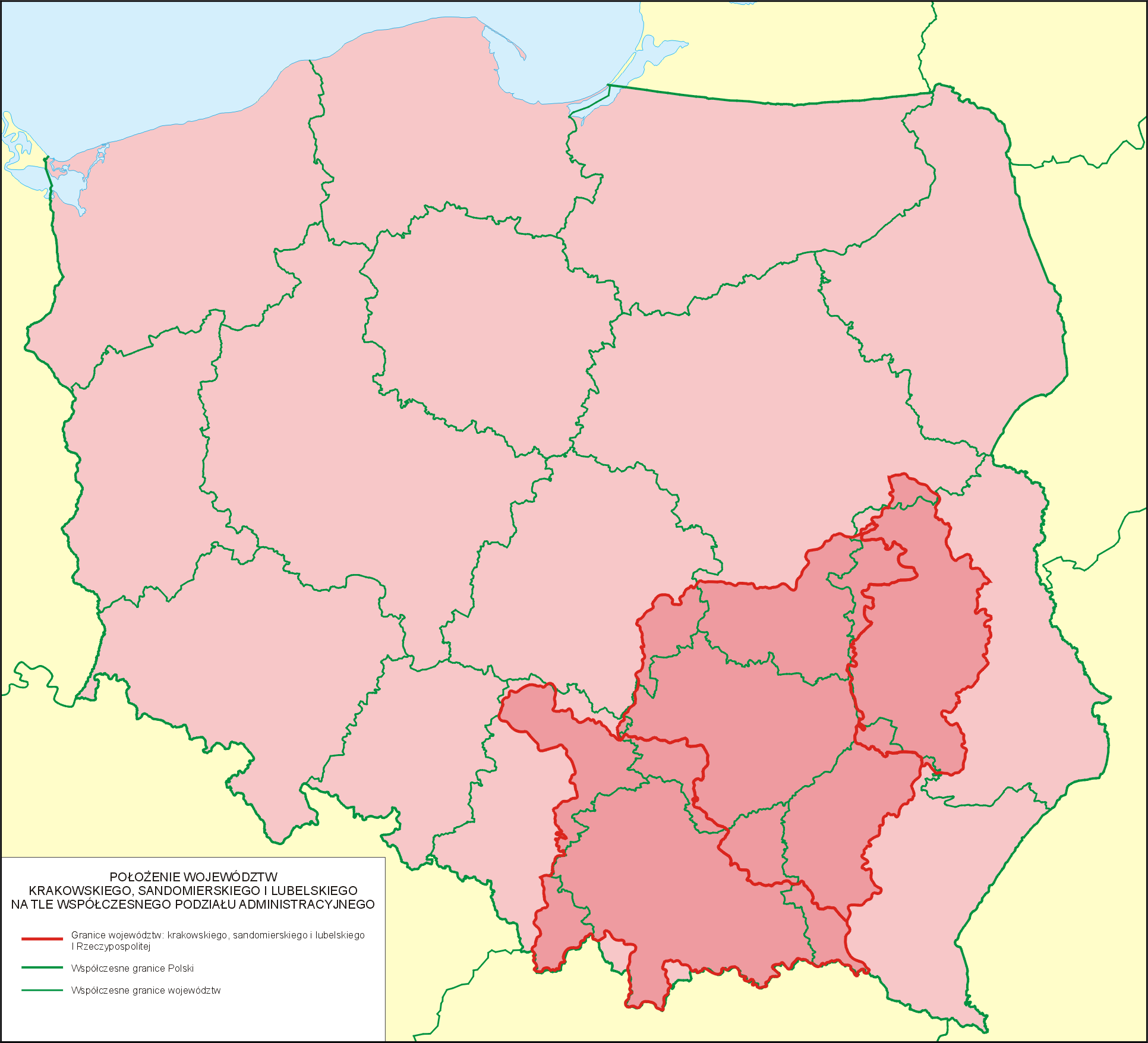
- Location of Lesser Poland (shown in darker pink) in Poland
- Country: Poland
- Seat: Kraków

Area
  - Total: 60,000 km^{2} (23,000 sq mi)

Population
  - Total: 9,000,000 (approx.)
  - Density: 150/km^{2} (390/sq mi)
- Time zone: UTC+1 (CET)
  - Summer (DST): UTC+2 (CEST)

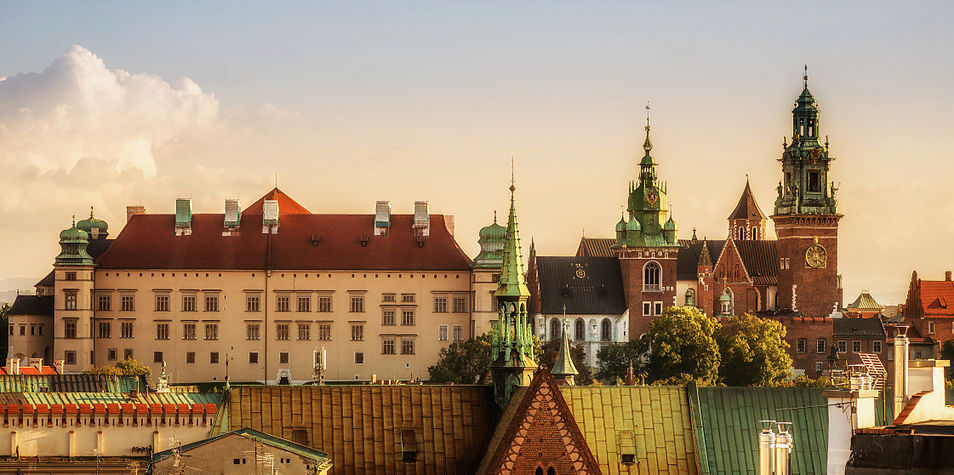
Wawel Castle in Kraków

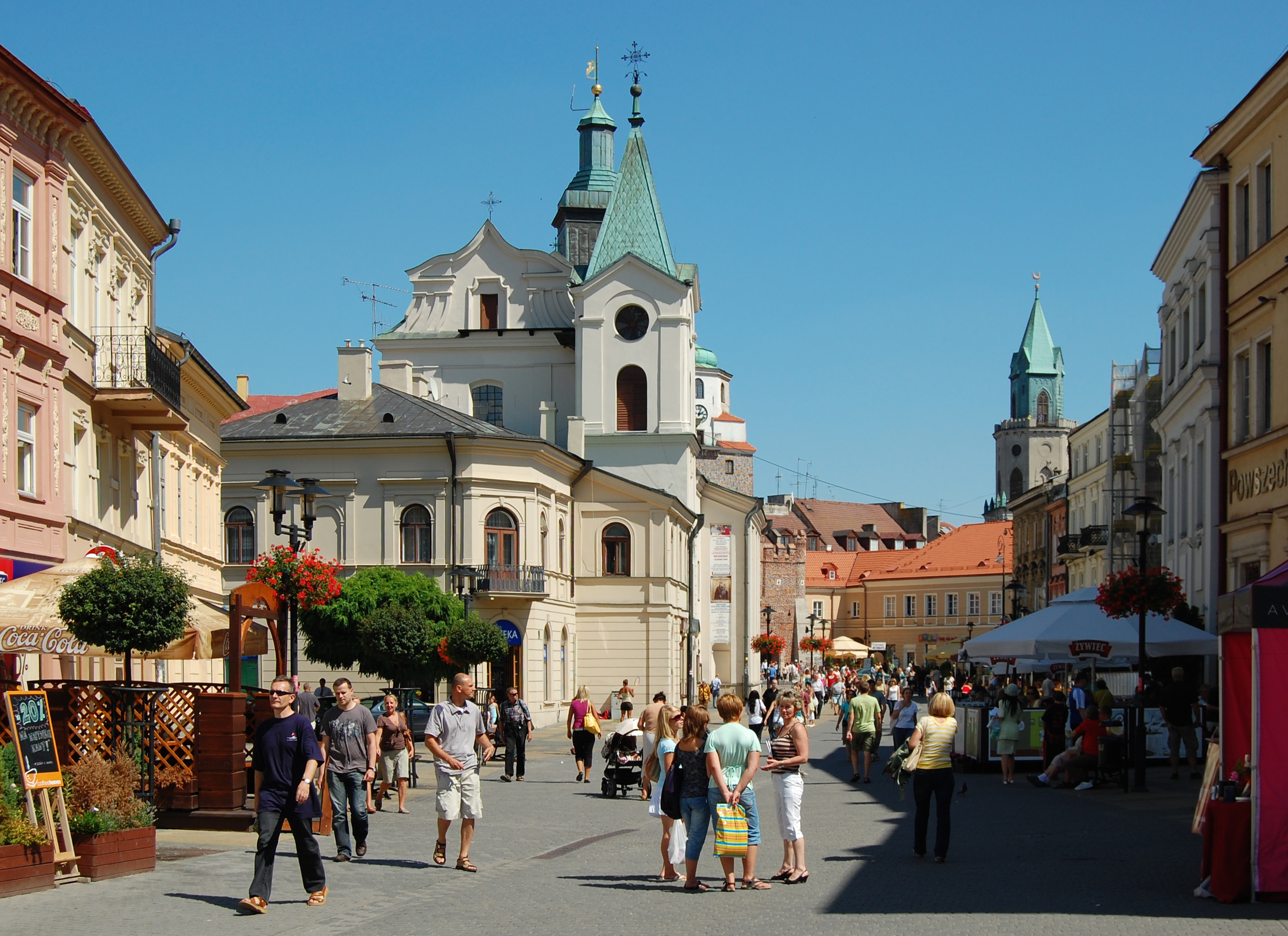
Old Town in Lublin

Lesser Poland, often known by its Polish name Małopolska (Polish: [mawɔˈpɔlska]; Latin: Polonia Minor), is a historical region situated in southern and south-eastern Poland. Its capital and largest city is Kraków. Throughout centuries, Lesser Poland developed a separate culture featuring diverse architecture, folk costumes, dances, cuisine, traditions and a rare Lesser Polish dialect. The region is rich in historical landmarks, monuments, castles, natural scenery and UNESCO World Heritage Sites.

The region should not be confused with the modern Lesser Poland Voivodeship, which covers only the southwestern part of Lesser Poland. Historical Lesser Poland was much larger than the current voivodeship that bears its name. It reached from Bielsko-Biała in the southwest as far as to Siedlce in the northeast. It consisted of the three voivodeships of Kraków, Sandomierz and Lublin.

It comprised almost 60,000 km^{2} in area; today's population in this area is about 9,000,000 inhabitants. Its landscape is mainly hilly, with the Carpathian Mountains and Tatra Mountain Range in the south. It is located in the basin of the upper Vistula river. It has been noted for its mighty aristocracy (magnateria) and wealthy nobility (szlachta).

Between the 14th and 18th century, the Lesser Poland Province of the Kingdom of Poland also encompassed the historical regions of Podlachia, Volhynia, Podolia and Red Ruthenia/Cherven Cities. In the era of partitions, the southern part of Lesser Poland became known as Galicia, which was under Austrian control until Poland regained its independence in 1918. As a result of this long-lasting division, many inhabitants of the northern part of Lesser Poland (including those in such cities as Lublin, Radom, Kielce and Częstochowa) do not recognize their Lesser Polish identity. However, while Lublin (Lubelskie) was declared an independent Voivodeship as early as 1474, it still has speakers of the Lesser Polish dialect.

Across history, many ethnic and religious minorities existed in Lesser Poland as they fled persecution from other areas or countries. Poland's once tolerant policy towards these minorities allowed them to flourish and create separate self-governing communities. Some minorities still remain, but are on the verge of extinction, most notably Wymysorys-speaking Vilamovians, Halcnovians, Gorals, Lemkos, and once Polish Jews and Walddeutsche Germans.

== Geography and boundaries ==
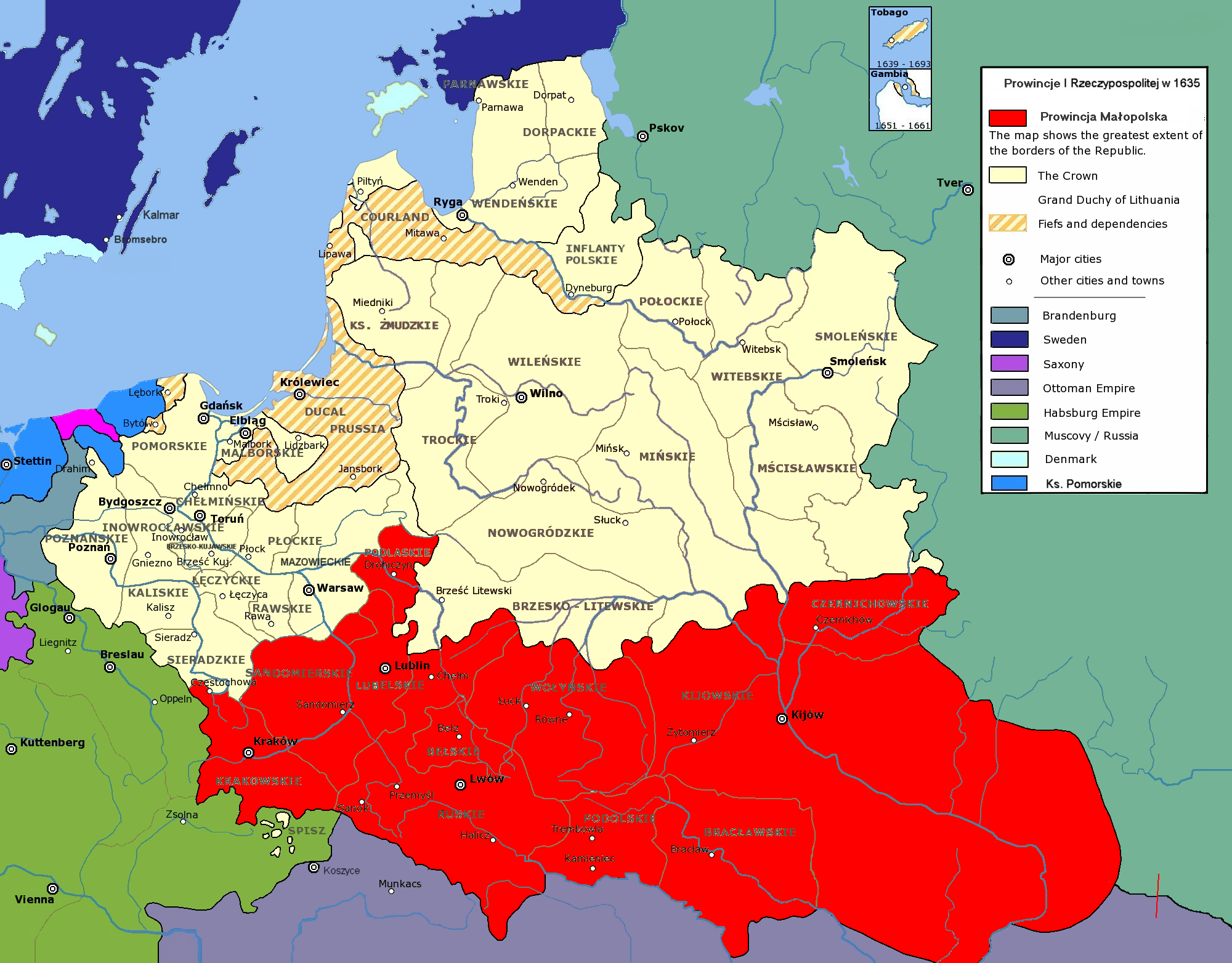
The Lesser Poland Province in the widest sense – with Podlachia, Podolia, Red Ruthenia, Volhynia and Kiev

Lesser Poland lies in the area of the upper confluence of the Vistula river and covers a large upland, including the Świętokrzyskie Mountains with the Kraków-Częstochowa Upland further west, Małopolska Upland, Sandomierz Basin, and Lublin Upland. Unlike other historical parts of the country, such as Kujawy, Mazovia, Podlachia, Pomerania, or Greater Poland, Lesser Poland is mainly hilly, with Poland's highest peak, Rysy, located within the borders of the province. Flat are northern and central areas of the province – around Tarnobrzeg, Stalowa Wola, Radom and Siedlce, also valleys of the main rivers – the Vistula, the Pilica, and the San. Apart from Rysy, there are several other peaks located in the province – Pilsko, Babia Góra, Turbacz, as well as Łysica in the Świętokrzyskie Mountains. The southern part of the province is covered by the Carpathian Mountains, which are made of smaller ranges, such as Pieniny, Tatry, and Beskidy.

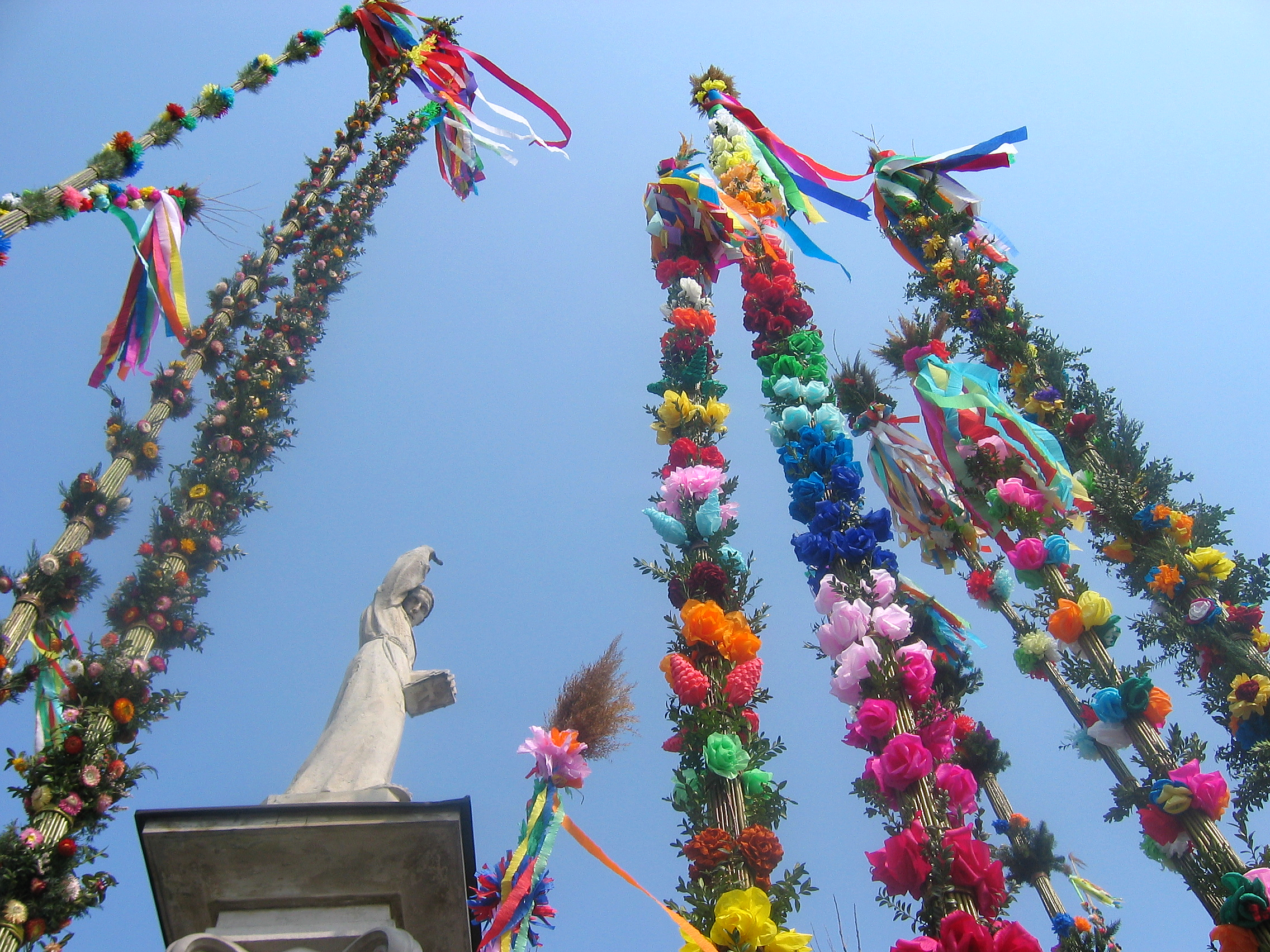
Palm Sunday in Lipnica Murowana.

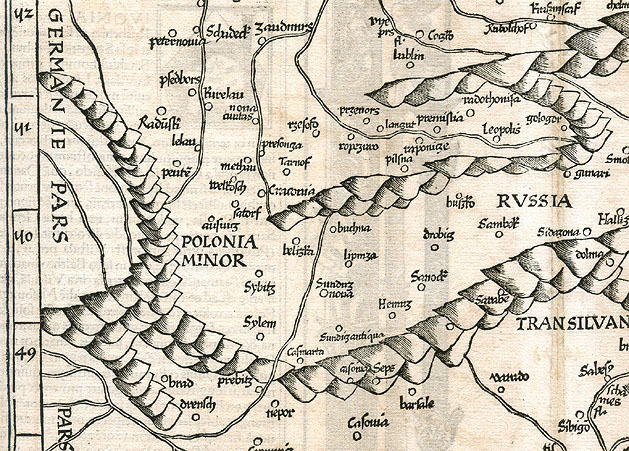
The 1507 Lesser Poland and Red Ruthenia Map (Polonia Minor, Russia) by Martin Waldseemüller

Almost the whole area is located in the Vistula Basin, with the exception of the western and southern parts, belonging to the Odra and Dunaj Basins. The main rivers of the province are the Vistula, upper Warta, Soła, Skawa, Raba, Dunajec, Wisłok, Wisłoka, San, Wieprz, Przemsza, Nida, Kamienna, Radomka, and Pilica. The major lakes of the province are Lake Rożnów, Lake Czchów, Lake Dobczyce, Lake Czorsztyn, Lake Czaniec, Lake Międzybrodzie, Lake Klimkówka and Żywiec Lake. Most of them are man-made reservoirs.

Lesser Poland stretches from the Carpathians in the south to Pilica and Liwiec rivers to the north. It borders Mazovia to the north, Podlaskie to the northeast, Red Ruthenia/Cherven Cities to the east, Slovakia to the south, Silesia to the west, and Greater Poland to the northwest. Currently, the region is divided between Polish voivodeships – Lesser Poland Voivodeship (whole), Świętokrzyskie Voivodeship (whole), Silesian Voivodeship (eastern half), Podkarpackie Voivodeship (western part), Masovian Voivodeship (southern part), Łódź Voivodeship (southeastern corner), and Lublin Voivodeship (western part).

In Silesian Voivodeship, the border between Silesia and Lesser Poland is easy to draw, because, with only a few exceptions, it goes along boundaries of local counties. In the south, it goes along the western boundary of the ancient Duchy of Teschen, with the borderline along the Biała river, with Zwardoń, Milówka and Rajcza located in Lesser Poland. Bielsko-Biała is a city made up of two parts – Lesser Poland's Biala (also called Biala Krakowska), makes up the eastern half of the city, and only in 1951 was it merged with Silesian Bielsko. Further north, the border goes along the western boundaries of the cities of Jaworzno, and Sosnowiec, along the Przemsza and Brynica rivers. Then it goes northwest, leaving Czeladź, Siewierz, Koziegłowy, Blachownia, Kłobuck and Krzepice within Lesser Poland. From Krzepice, the border goes eastwards, towards Koniecpol, and along the Pilica river, with such towns as Przedborz, Opoczno, Drzewica, Białobrzegi, and Kozienice located within Lesser Poland. East of Białobrzegi, the boundary goes mainly along the Radomka river, to the Vistula. East of the Vistula, the boundary goes north of Łaskarzew and Żelechów, and south of Mazovian town of Garwolin, turning northwest. The northernmost point of the province is marked by the Liwiec river, with both Siedlce, and Łuków being part of Lesser Poland. The line then goes south, with Miedzyrzec Podlaski being part of the historical Grand Duchy of Lithuania, and Radzyń Podlaski as well as Parczew left in Lesser Poland.

Between the Vistula and the Bug Rivers, the eastern border of Lesser Poland goes west of Leczna, but east of Krasnystaw and Szczebrzeszyn, both of which historically belong to Red Ruthenia/Cherven Cities. Further south, Lesser Poland includes Frampol, and Biłgoraj, which lie in the southeastern corner on Lesser Poland's historical Lublin Voivodeship, close to the border with Red Ruthenia/Cherven Cities. The border then goes west of Biłgoraj, turning south, towards Leżajsk (which belongs to Red Ruthenia/Cherven Cities). The boundary between Lesser Poland and Red Ruthenia/Cherven Cities was described by Ukrainian historian and geographer Myron Korduba as being along the line Dukla – Krosno – Domaradz – Czudec – Krzeszów nad Sanem. The border towns of Lesser Poland were: Rudnik, Kolbuszowa, Ropczyce, Sędziszów Małopolski, Strzyżów, Jasło, Gorlice, and Biecz. The southern border of Lesser Poland goes along the Carpathian Mountains, and, except in a few cases, it has not changed for centuries. The cities of Leżajsk, Rzeszów, Sanok, Brzozów, and Krosno do not belong to historical Lesser Poland, as they are part of Red Ruthenia/Cherven Cities (Lwów Voivodeship, around today's Lviv, Ukraine).

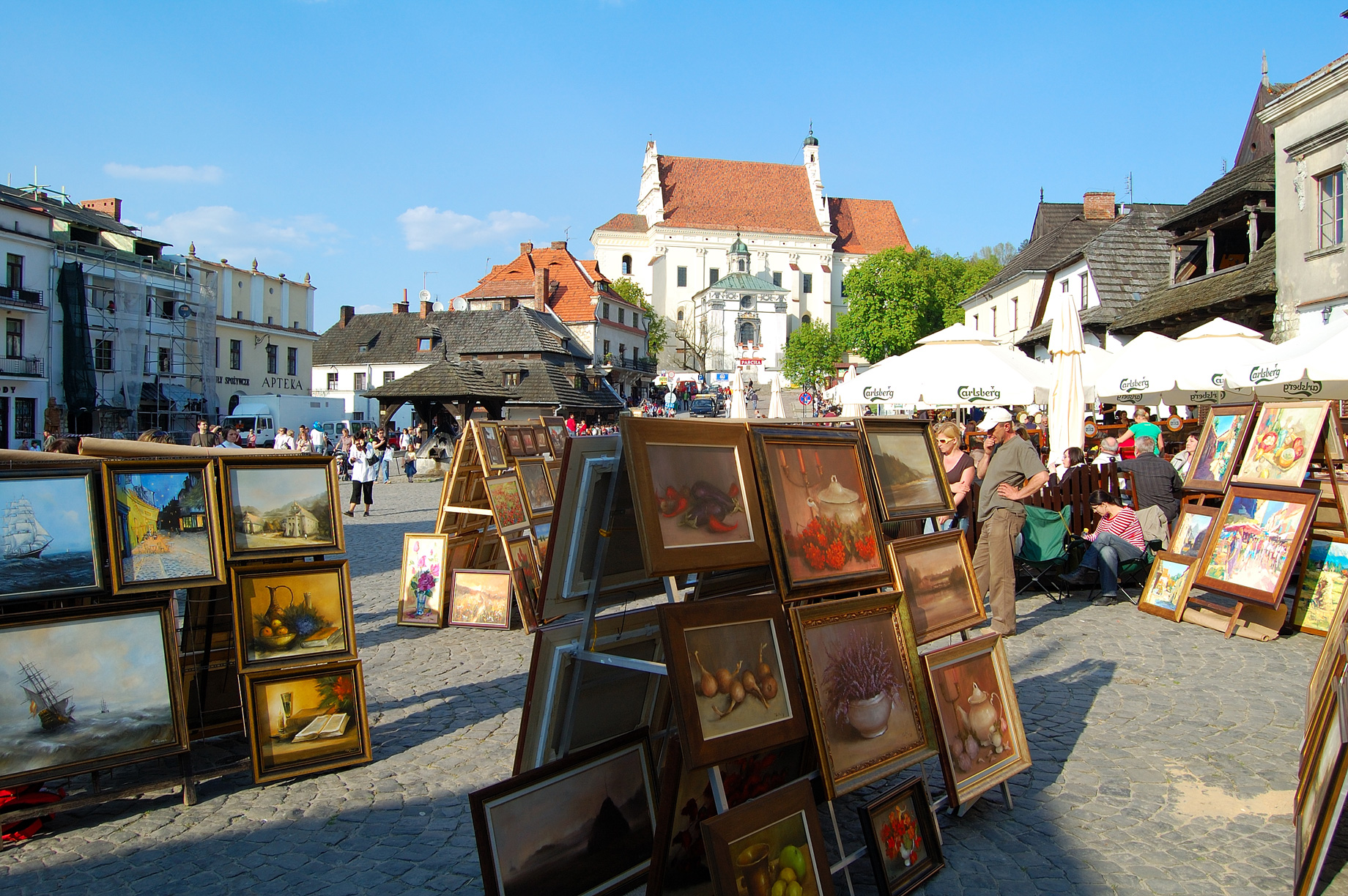
Kazimierz Dolny on the right bank of the Vistula river.

Historically, Lesser Poland was divided into two lands - Kraków Land and Sandomierz Land, both of which emerged after the Testament of Bolesław III Krzywousty. In the 14th century, Sandomierz Voivodeship and Kraków Voivodeship were created, and in 1474, Lublin Voivodeship was carved out of three Sandomierz Voivodeship counties, located on the right bank of the Vistula. Historian Adolf Pawiński, who in the late 19th century was the director of the Polish Central Archives of Historical Records, estimated in his book "Polska XVI wieku pod względem geograficzno-statystycznym", that the size of Kraków Voivodeship was 19,028 km^{2}. Sandomierz Voivodeship had an area of 25,762 km^{2}, and Lublin Voivodeship had an area of 11,033 km^{2}. Together with the Duchy of Siewierz (607 km^{2}), and the parts of Spiš that belonged to Poland after the Treaty of Lubowla (1211 km^{2}), the total area of Lesser Poland was 57,640 square kilometers. Apart from the three historic lands, Lesser Poland includes other smaller regions, such as Podhale, Ponidzie, and Zagłębie Dąbrowskie.

== Etymology ==
Zygmunt Gloger in his work Historical geography of land of ancient Poland (Geografia historyczna ziem dawnej Polski) states that according to a Polish custom, whenever a new village was formed next to an older one, the name of the new entity was presented with an adjective little (or lesser), while the old village was described as greater. The same procedure was used in naming two Polish provinces – the "older" one, the cradle of the Polish state, was called Greater Poland, and its "younger sister", which became part of Poland a few years later, was called Lesser Poland. The name Greater Poland (Polonia Maior) was for the first time used in 1242, by princes Boleslaw and Przemysław I, who named themselves Duces Majoris Poloniae (Princes of the Older Poland). Lesser Poland, or Polonia Minor, appeared for the first time in historical documents in 1493, in the Statutes of Piotrków, during the reign of King Jan Olbracht, to distinguish this province from Greater Poland (Polonia Maior).

== History ==
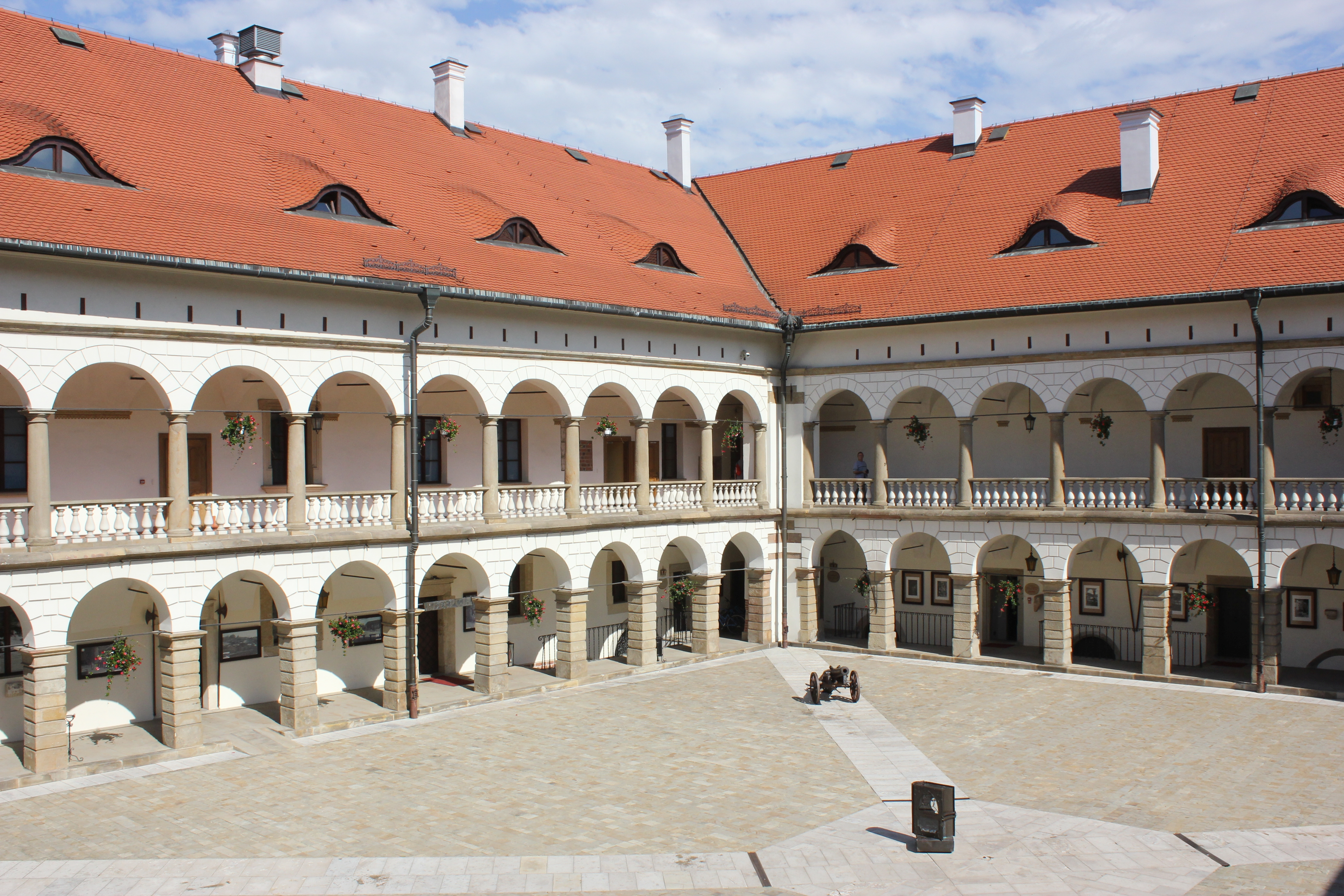
Niepołomice Castle

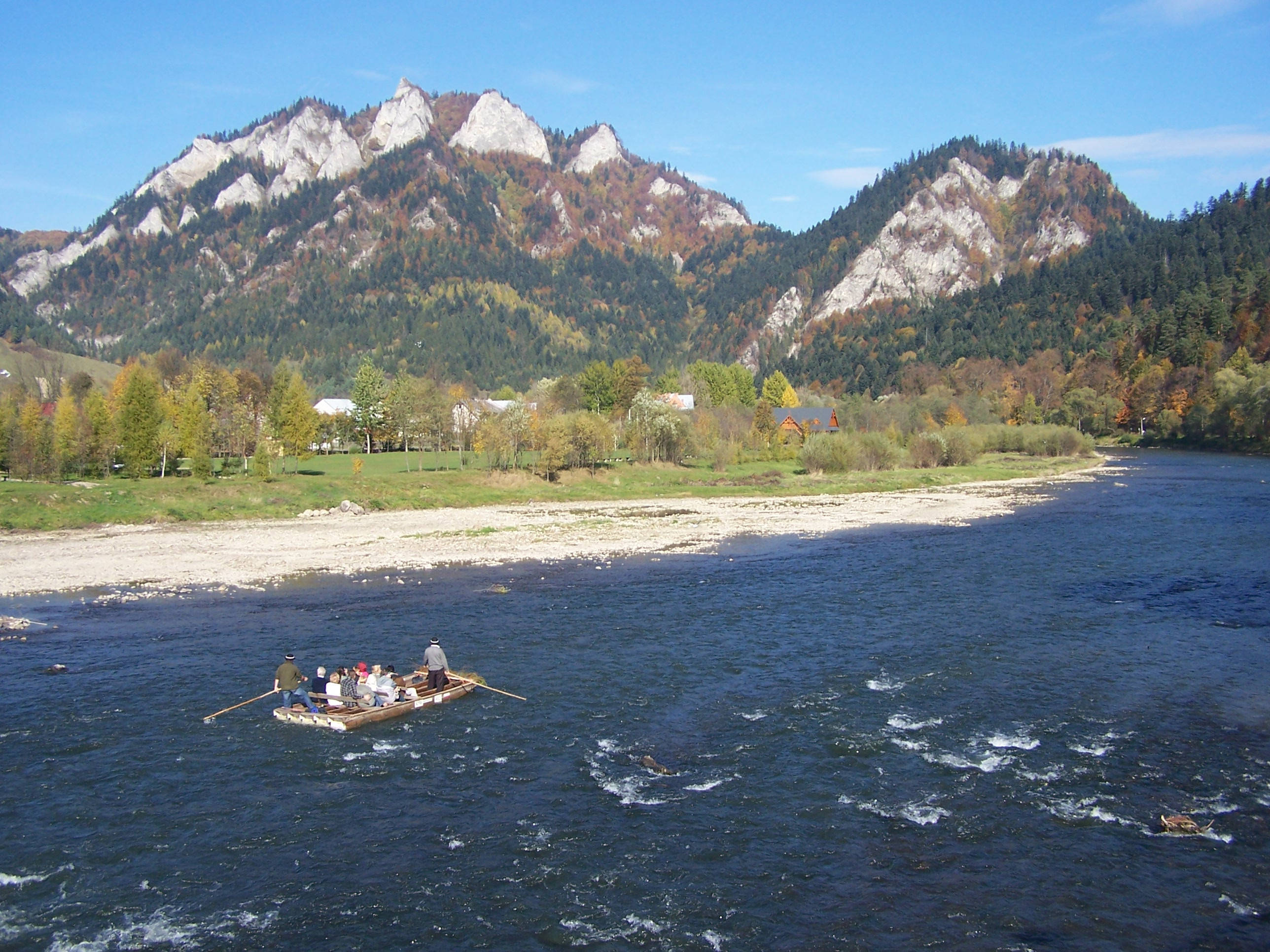
Pieniny National Park

=== Early period and Kingdom of Poland ===
In the first years of Polish statehood, southern Lesser Poland was inhabited by the West Slavic tribe of Vistulans, with two major centers in Kraków and Wiślica. Their land, which had probably been part of Great Moravia, and Bohemia, was annexed by Mieszko I of Poland some time in the late 10th century. Cosmas of Prague in his Chronicle of Bohemians wrote: "Polish prince Mieszko, a cunning man, seized by ruse the city of Kraków, killing with sword all Czechs he found there". Northern part of Lesser Poland (Lublin and Sandomierz) was probably inhabited by another tribe, the Lendians, and Dr Antoni Podraza, historian of the Jagiellonian University claims that ancient division of Lesser Poland into two major parts – Land (Duchy) of Kraków, and Land (Duchy) of Sandomierz, is based on the existence of two Slavic tribes in the area. However, exact location of the Lendians has not been determined to this day. Some historians speculate that they occupied Cherven Cities, and their center was in Przemyśl. Around the year 1000, the Roman Catholic Archdiocese of Kraków was created, and its borders covered whole area of Lesser Poland. During the reign of Casimir I the Restorer, Kraków for the first time became the capital of Poland (around 1040), since Greater Poland and Silesia, with main Polish urban centers, such as Gniezno and Poznań were ravaged by Duke Bretislaus I of Bohemia. In 1138, following the Testament of Bolesław III Krzywousty, the country was divided between his sons (see also Fragmentation of Poland). Bolesław III Wrymouth created the Seniorate Province, which, among others, consisted of Kraków. At the same time, Lesser Poland was divided into two parts, when its eastern part formed the Duchy of Sandomierz, carved by the ruler for his son Henry of Sandomierz.

During the fragmentation period, both lands of Lesser Poland were frequently ruled by the same prince. Among them were Bolesław IV the Curly, Mieszko III the Old, Casimir II the Just, Leszek I the White, Bolesław V the Chaste, Leszek II the Black, Władysław I the Elbow-high, and King of Bohemia, Wenceslaus II of Bohemia, who united Lesser Poland in 1290/1291. The province was pillaged during the Mongol invasion of Poland, when a combined army of Kraków and Sandomierz was destroyed by Baidar in the Battle of Chmielnik. The loss was so heavy that Norman Davies wrote: "At Chmielnik, the assembled nobility of Małopolska perished to a man." During their 1241, 1259, and 1287 invasions, the Mongols burned major cities of Lesser Poland, killing thousands of people. Furthermore, the province, especially its northeastern part, was often raided by the Lithuanians, Rusyns, Yotvingians, and Old Prussians. The city of Lublin suffered most frequently – among others, it was burnt by the Rusyns in 1244, the Lithuanians 1255, the Prussians in 1266, and the Yotvingians in 1282. Another center of the province, Sandomierz, was destroyed by the Tartars in 1260, and burnt by the Lithuanians in 1349.

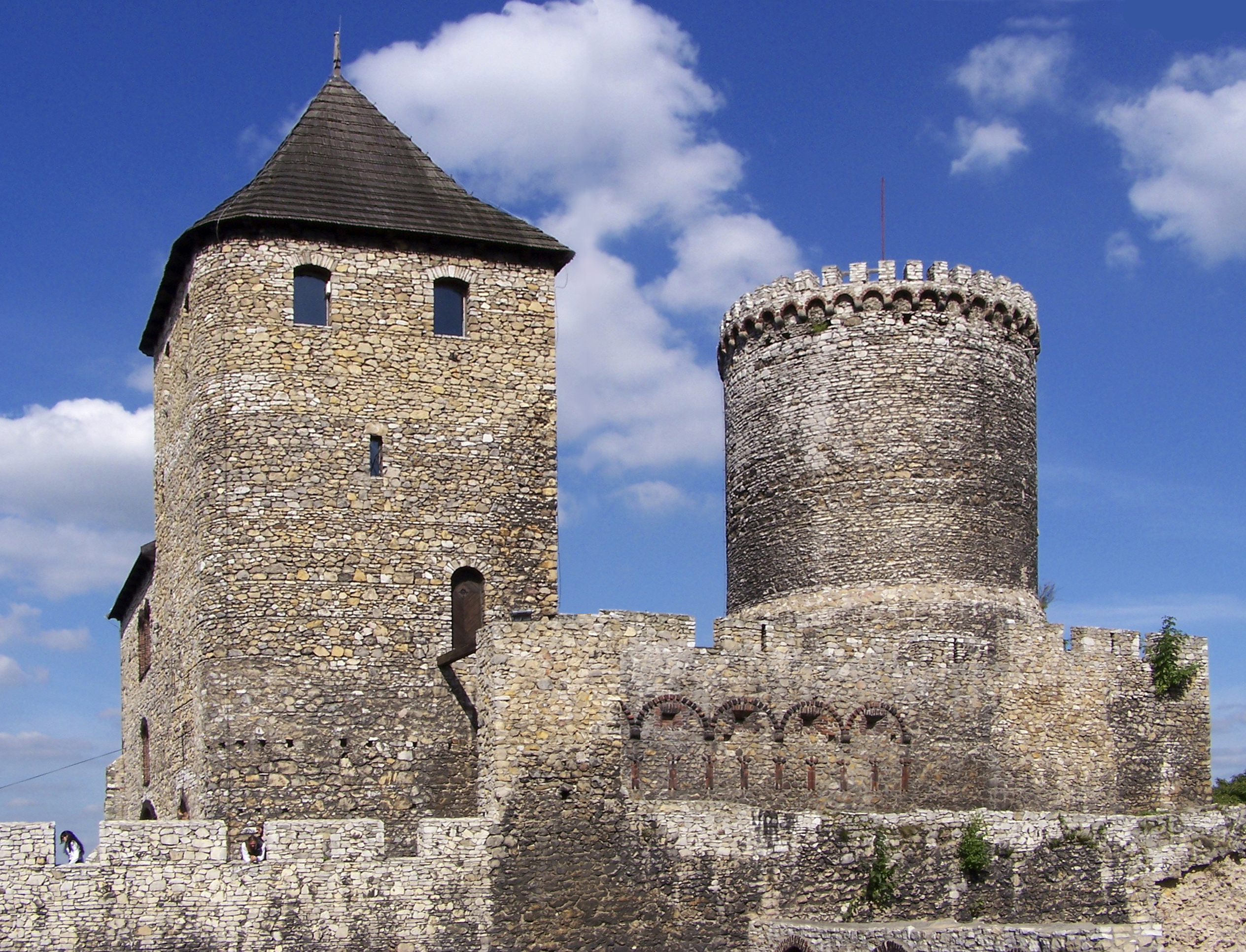
Będzin Castle, which guarded the western border of Lesser Poland

Unlike other Polish provinces, especially Silesia, Lesser Poland did not undergo further fragmentation, and in the early 14th century became the core of the reunited nation (together with Greater Poland). The period of nation's fragmentation came to a symbolic end on 30 January 1320, when Władysław I the Elbow-high was crowned as King of Poland. The ceremony took place in Kraków's Wawel Cathedral, and the king of the reunited country decided to choose Kraków as the capital. Through 14th and 15th centuries, Lesser Poland's position as the most important province of the nation was cemented. It became visible during the reign of Casimir III the Great, who favored less known Lesser Poland's noble families, at the expense of Greater Poland's nobility. The reign of Casimir the Great was a period of growing prosperity of Lesser Poland. With high density of population, fertile soils and rich deposits of minerals (especially salt in Bochnia and Wieliczka, as well as lead in Olkusz), the province was the richest part of Poland. After the recapture of the Cherven Cities/Red Ruthenia, Lesser Poland lost its status of the borderland, and both regions created an economic bridge between Poland and the ports of the Black Sea. The king, who drew Jewish settlers from across Europe to his country, built several castles along western border of Lesser Poland, with the most notable ones in Skawina, Pieskowa Skała, Będzin, Lanckorona, Olkusz, Lelów, Bobolice, Krzepice, Ogrodzieniec, Ojców, Olsztyn, Bobolice, Mirów (see also Eagle Nests Trail). Furthermore, he built or strengthened castles in other parts of the province, such as Szydlow, Chęciny, Wiślica, Radom, Niedzica, Opoczno, Lublin, Sandomierz, as well as the Wawel Castle. Also, during his reign (1333–1370), Casimir the Great founded on Magdeburg rights several cities, urbanizing hitherto rural province. Among major Lesser Poland's cities founded by the King, there are:

#	City	Founded	Current voivodeship
1.	Kazimierz	1334	now a district of Kraków
2.	Kłobuck	1339	Silesian Voivodeship
3.	Dobczyce	1340	Lesser Poland Voivodeship
4.	Grybów	1340	Lesser Poland Voivodeship
5.	Tuchów	1340	Lesser Poland Voivodeship
6.	Lelów	1340	Silesian Voivodeship
7.	Myślenice	1342	Lesser Poland Voivodeship
8.	Nowy Targ	1346	Lesser Poland Voivodeship
9.	Biecz	1348	Lesser Poland Voivodeship
10.	Krościenko nad Dunajcem	1348	Lesser Poland Voivodeship
11.	Piwniczna-Zdrój	1348	Lesser Poland Voivodeship
12.	Opoczno	1350	Łódź Voivodeship
13.	Radom	1350	Masovian Voivodeship
14.	Tymbark	1354	Lesser Poland Voivodeship
15.	Pilzno	1354	Subcarpathian Voivodeship
16.	Chęciny	1354	Świętokrzyskie Voivodeship
17.	Proszowice	1358	Lesser Poland Voivodeship
18.	Będzin	1358	Silesian Voivodeship
19.	Dębica	1358	Subcarpathian Voivodeship
20.	Stopnica	1362	Lesser Poland Voivodeship
21.	Ropczyce	1362	Subcarpathian Voivodeship
22.	Skawina	1364	Lesser Poland Voivodeship
23.	Muszyna	1364	Lesser Poland Voivodeship
24.	Jasło	1366	Subcarpathian Voivodeship
25.	Brzostek	1366	Subcarpathian Voivodeship
26.	Wojnicz	1369	Lesser Poland Voivodeship

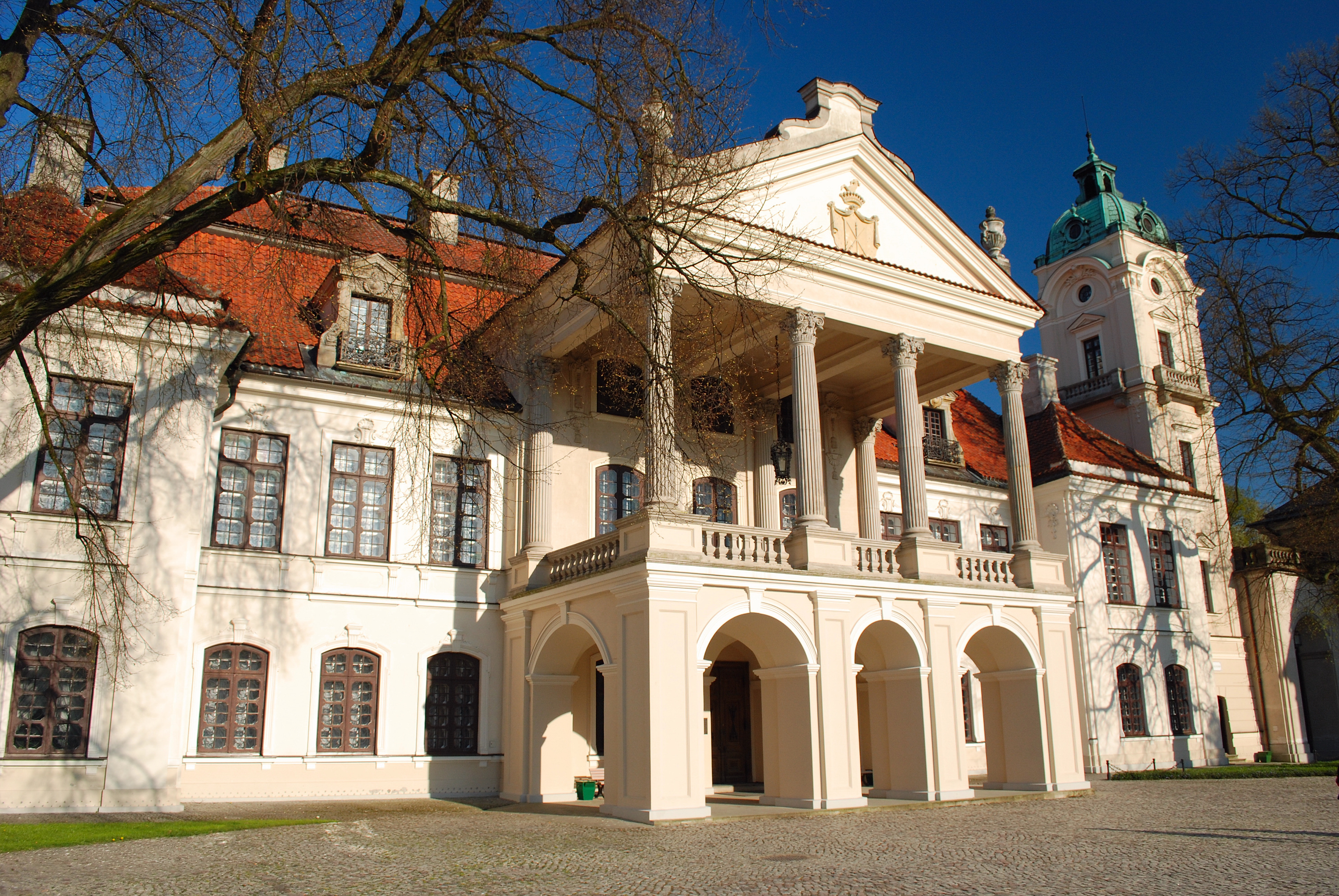
Kozłówka Palace

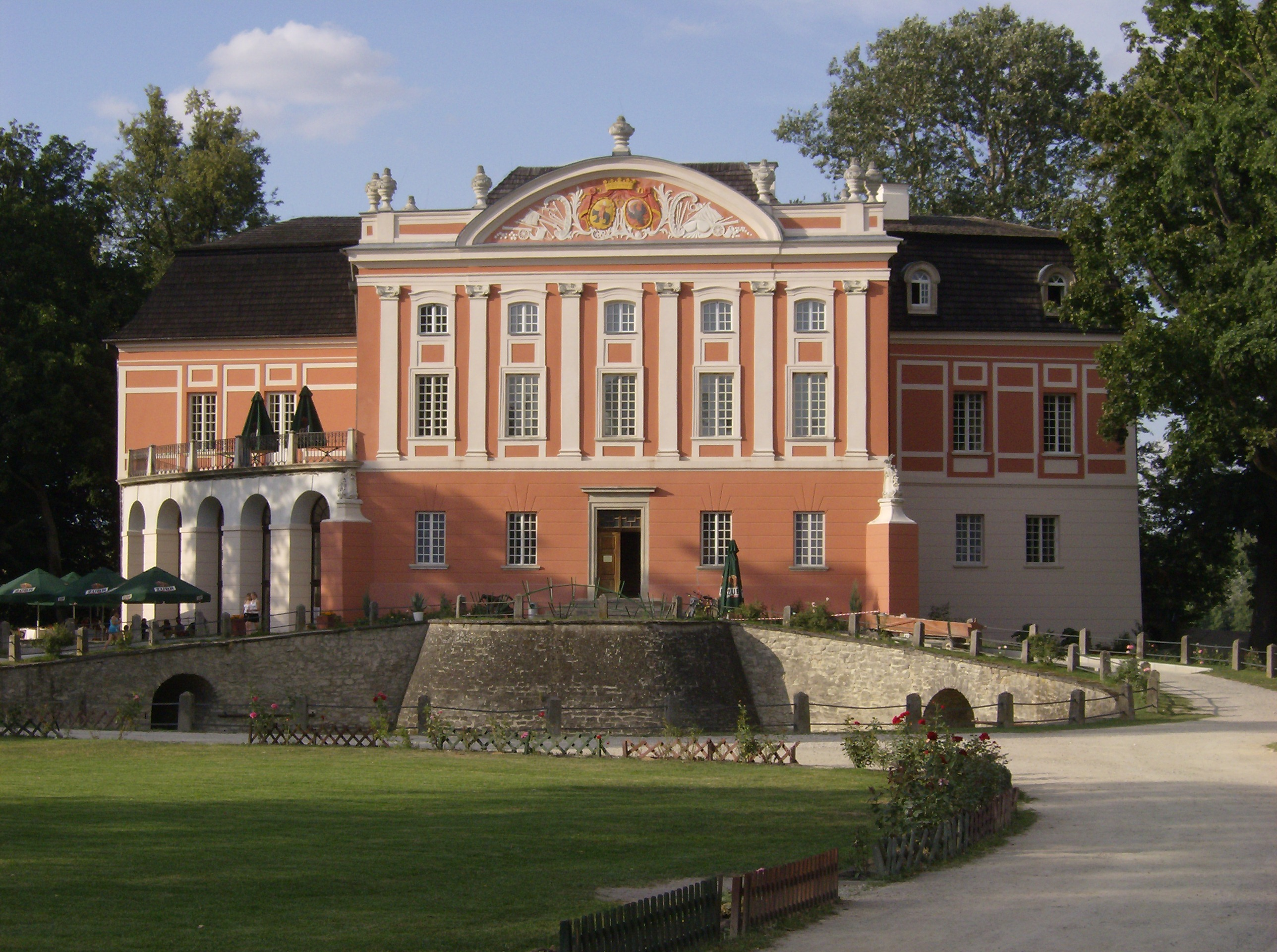
Palatial residence in Kurozwęki

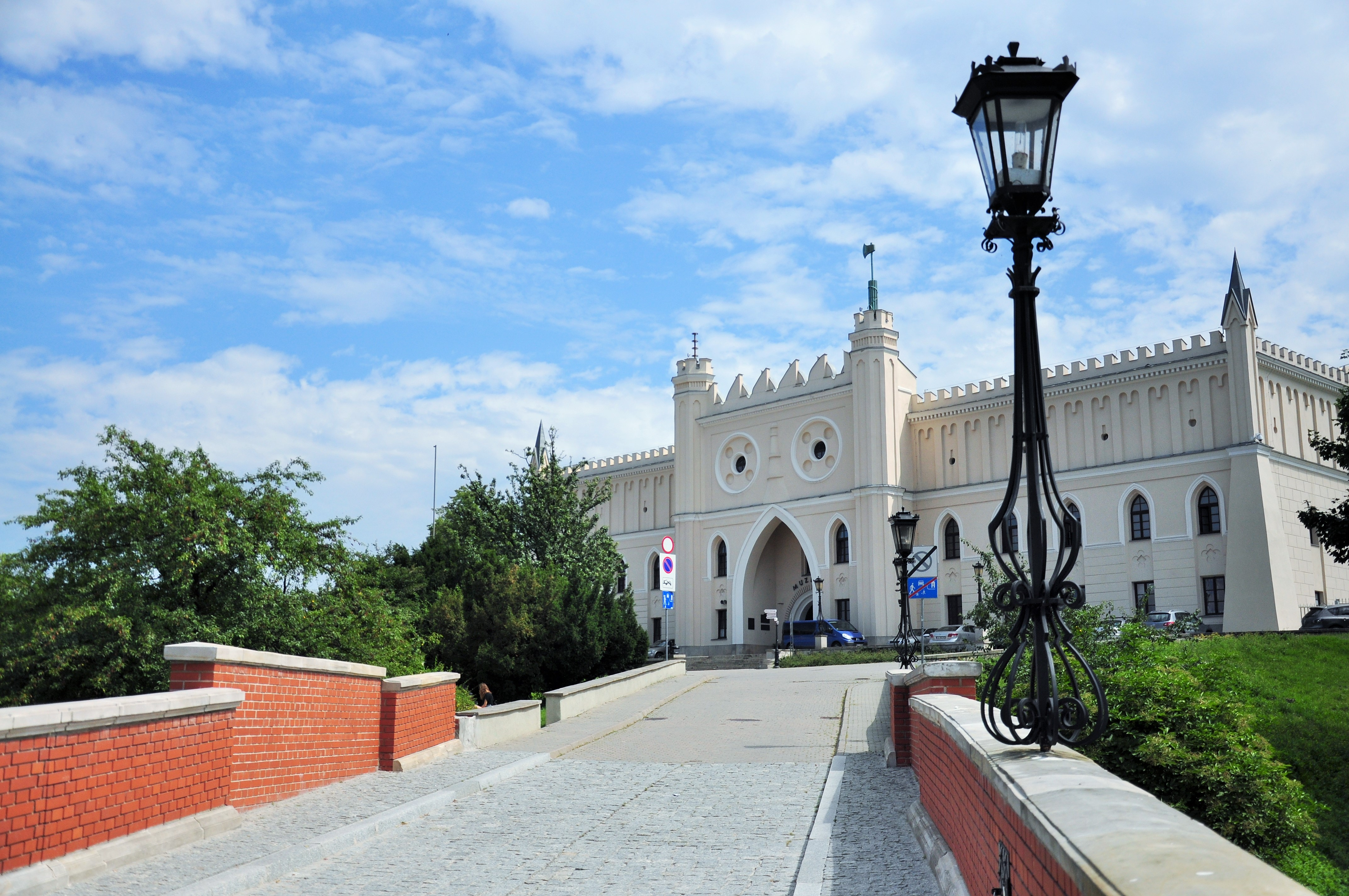
Neogothic façade of Lublin Castle

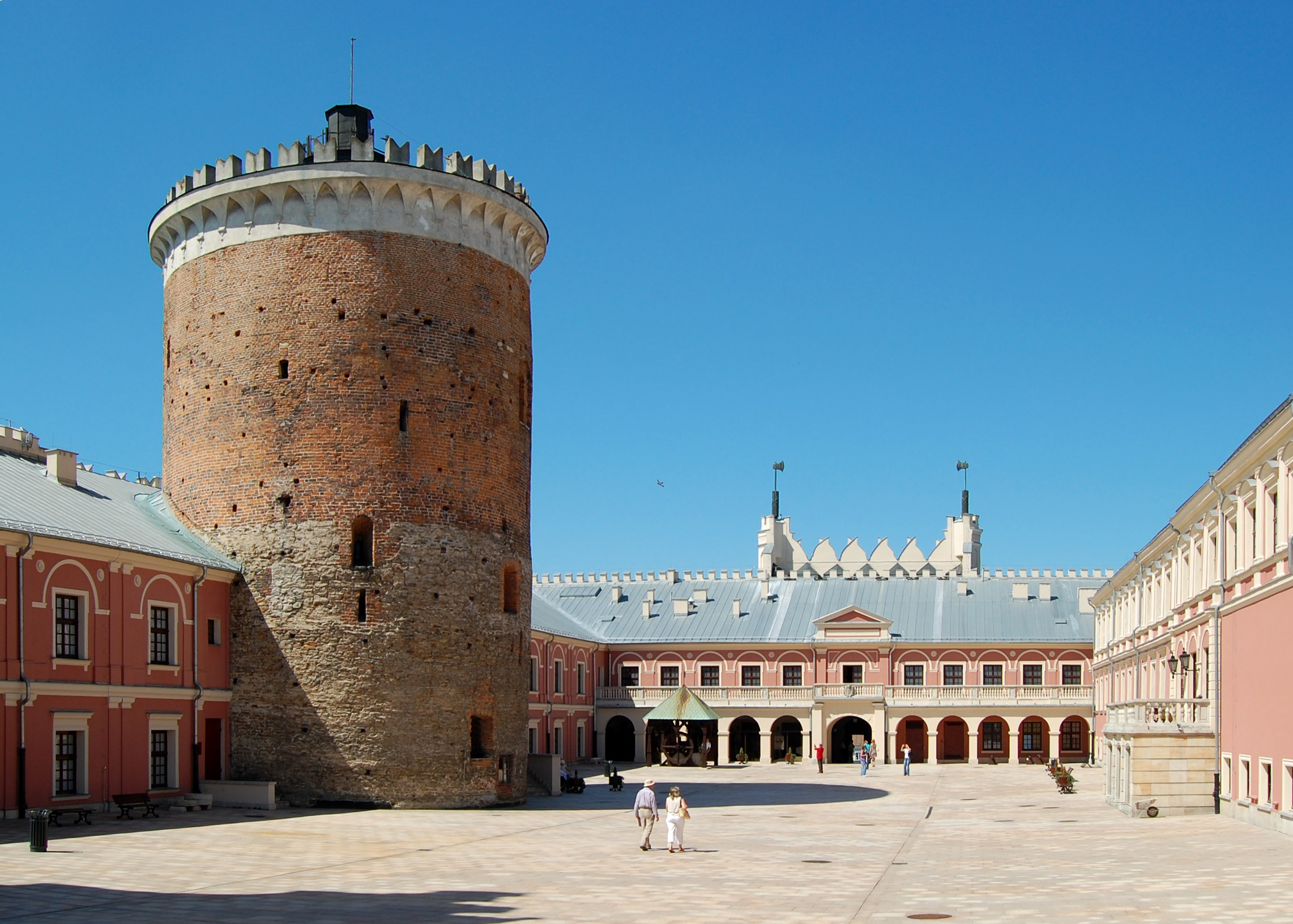
Castle courtyard with a fortified keep

In the Kingdom of Poland, Lesser Poland was made of three voivodeships – Kraków Voivodeship, Sandomierz Voivodeship, and Lublin Voivodeship, created in 1474 out of eastern part of the Sandomierz Voivodeship. Borders of the province remained unchanged until 1772. The only exception was large part of contemporary Upper Silesia (the area around Bytom, Toszek, Siewierz, and Oświęcim), which belonged to Duchy of Kraków until 1179. In that year, prince of Kraków Casimir II the Just, handed these lands to Prince of Opole Mieszko I Tanglefoot. The Duchy of Siewierz, ruled since 1443 by the Archbishop of Kraków, merged with Lesser Poland in 1790. Other Silesian realms lost in 1179, also returned to Lesser Poland – Duchy of Zator (in 1513), and Duchy of Oświęcim (1564). Both duchies merged into a Silesian County of the Kraków Voivodeship, and shared the fate of Lesser Poland. Apart from Jews, among other ethnic minorities of the province were the Walddeutsche, who settled the borderland of Lesser Poland and Red Ruthenia (14th through 17th centuries). In the Middle Ages, the Germans inhabited several cities of Lesser Poland, especially Kraków and Sandomierz (see Rebellion of wójt Albert).

In the late Middle Ages, Lesser Poland gradually became the center of Polish statehood, with Kraków being the capital of the country from the mid-11th century until 1596. Its nobility ruled Poland when Queen Jadwiga was too young to control the state, and the Union of Krewo with the Grand Duchy of Lithuania was the brainchild of Lesser Poland's szlachta.

In the 15th and 16th centuries, Lesser Poland remained the most important part of the country. After the death of Casimir the Great, Lesser Poland's nobility promoted Louis I of Hungary as the new king, later supporting his daughter Jadwiga of Poland in exchange for Privilege of Koszyce. Since Jadwiga, crowned on 16 October 1384, was too young to rule the country, Poland was in fact governed by the Lesser Poland's nobility, who decided to find her a husband, Grand Duke of Lithuania, Jogaila. Consequently, unions of Poland and Lithuania at Krewo and Horodło were the brainchildren of Lesser Poland's nobility, among whom the most influential individuals were Spytek z Melsztyna, and cardinal Zbigniew Olesnicki. Other famous Lesser Poland's families are Lubomirski family, Kmita family, Tarnowski family, Potocki family, Sobieski family, Koniecpolski family, Ossolinski family, Poniatowski family.

Since Lesser Poland was the most important province of the country, several important events took place on its territory. In 1364, Casimir the Great called the Congress of Kraków, and in 1401, the Union of Vilnius and Radom was signed. In 1505 in Radom, the Sejm adopted the Nihil novi title, which forbade the King to issue laws without the consent of the nobility. In the same year, also in the same city, Polish law was codified in the Łaski's Statute, and the Crown Tribunal (the highest appeal court in the Crown of the Polish Kingdom) held its sessions in Lublin. In 1525, the Treaty of Kraków was signed, ending the Polish–Teutonic War. Lesser Poland also is home to the oldest Polish university – the Jagiellonian University, founded in 1364 by Casimir the Great, and several outstanding figures of early Polish culture were born here, such as Jan Kochanowski, Mikołaj Rej, Jan z Lublina, Mikołaj Gomółka, Maciej Miechowita, Marcin Kromer, Łukasz Górnicki, and Mikołaj Radomski.

=== Polish–Lithuanian Commonwealth ===
In the 16th century, Lesser Poland retained its position as the most important province of the country. As no major conflicts took place on its territory, it was the center of Renaissance in Poland. The province was home to numerous scholars, writers and statesmen, and it was here where Polish–Lithuanian Commonwealth was created in 1569 (see Union of Lublin). In the Commonwealth, Lesser Poland proper was the base of the Lesser Poland Province, which covered southern lands of the vast country. The province was made of Lesser Poland itself, also Podlachia, Red Ruthenia/Cherven Cities, Volhynia, Podolia, and Ukrainian voivodeships of Kijów (Kyiv) and Czernihów (Chernihiv), which, until 1569, had been part of the Grand Duchy of Lithuania.

The period in Polish history known as the Polish Golden Age was very fortunate for Lesser Poland. Kings of the Jagiellonian dynasty, especially Sigismund I the Old (himself born in Lesser Poland's Kozienice), and his son Sigismund II Augustus (born in Kraków), resided in Kraków, which was the capital of the immense Polish – Lithuanian Commonwealth. Lesser Poland's prosperity was reflected in numerous examples of Renaissance architecture complexes, built across the province. In 1499, hitherto Gothic Wawel Castle was damaged in a fire, and a few years later, Sigismund I, with help of the best native and foreign artists (such as Francesco the Florentine, Bartholomeo Berrecci or Niccolo Castiglione) refurbished the complex into a splendid Renaissance palace. Furthermore, in the early 16th century, several palaces were built in Lesser Poland – in Drzewica, Szydłowiec, Ogrodzieniec, and Pieskowa Skała. The province became rich mostly due to the grain trade, conducted along the Vistula, and among cities which prospered in the 16th century, there are Kraków, Sandomierz, Lublin, Kazimierz Dolny, Pilzno, Tarnów, Radom, Biecz. In later years of the 16th century, further palaces were built or remodelled in Baranow Sandomierski, and Niepołomice.

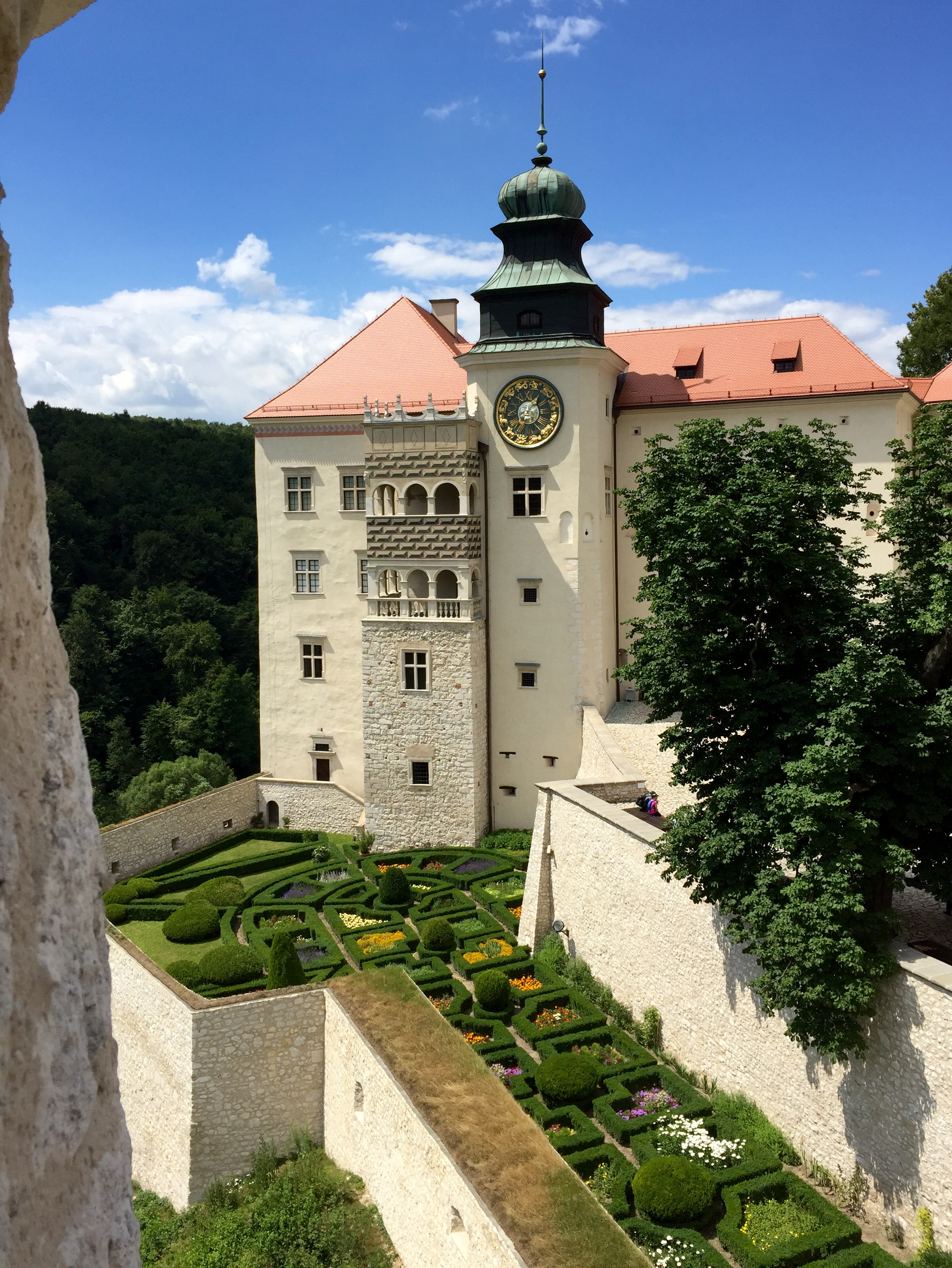
Pieskowa Skała

In the early 16th century, Protestant Reformation spread across the Commonwealth, and Lesser Poland became one of early centers of the movement, when students from Wittenberg brought the news to Kraków. In the first years of the century, professor of Jagiellonian University Jakub of Iłża (Jakub z Ilzy, died 1542) became one of the main promoters of the movement in the region. He actively supported the notions of Martin Luther, and in 1528 was called to the Bishop of Kraków's court. Convicted of heresy, he was forced to leave Poland in 1535. Reformation soon became very popular among Lesser Poland's nobility, especially Calvinism, and according to one estimate, some 20% of local szlachta converted from Roman Catholicism. They were attracted by Calvinism's democratic character, and Lesser Poland's center of the movement was set in the town of Pińczów, which came to be known as Sarmatian Athens. It was in Pińczów, where a local nobleman converted a Roman Catholic parish into a Protestant one, opened a Calvinist Academy, and published its Antitrinitarian confession in 1560 and in 1561. Several Calvinist synods took place in Lesser Poland – the first one in Słomniki (1554), Pińczów (the first united Synod of Poland and Lithuania – 1556 1561), and Kraków (1562). In 1563, also in Pińczów, the so-called Brest Bible was translated into Polish. In 1570, the Sandomierz Agreement was signed by a number of Protestant groups, with the exception of the Polish Brethren, another religious group very influential in Lesser Poland. The Brethren had their center in Lesser Poland's village of Raków, where a main Arian printing press, as well as a college, known as Akademia Rakowska (Gymnasium Bonarum Artium) founded in 1602 were located. Among distinguished European scholars associated with the school, there were Johannes Crellius, Corderius, and Valentinus Smalcius (who translated into German the Racovian Catechism).

In 1572, the Jagiellon dynasty died out, and next year, Henry III of France became first elected king of the country. After his short reign, and War of the Polish Succession (1587–88), which also took place in Lesser Poland, the new ruler was Stephen Báthory of Poland, who died in 1586. The ruler from Transylvania was followed by Sigismund III Vasa of Sweden, whose election marked gradual decline of the province. Sigismund's eyes were set on Sweden, and for many years he concentrated his efforts on a futile attempt to regain his former Swedish throne (see Polish–Swedish union, War against Sigismund). Therefore, Lesser Poland, located in southwestern corner of the Commonwealth, began to lose its importance, which was marked in 1596, when Sigismund moved his permanent residence, court and the crown headquarters to centrally located Warsaw.

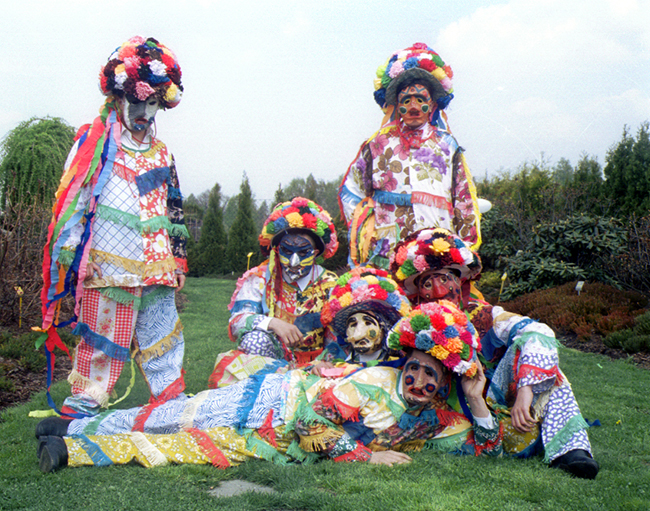
Members of the regional Folk Group of Wilamowice "Cepelia Fil Wilamowice"

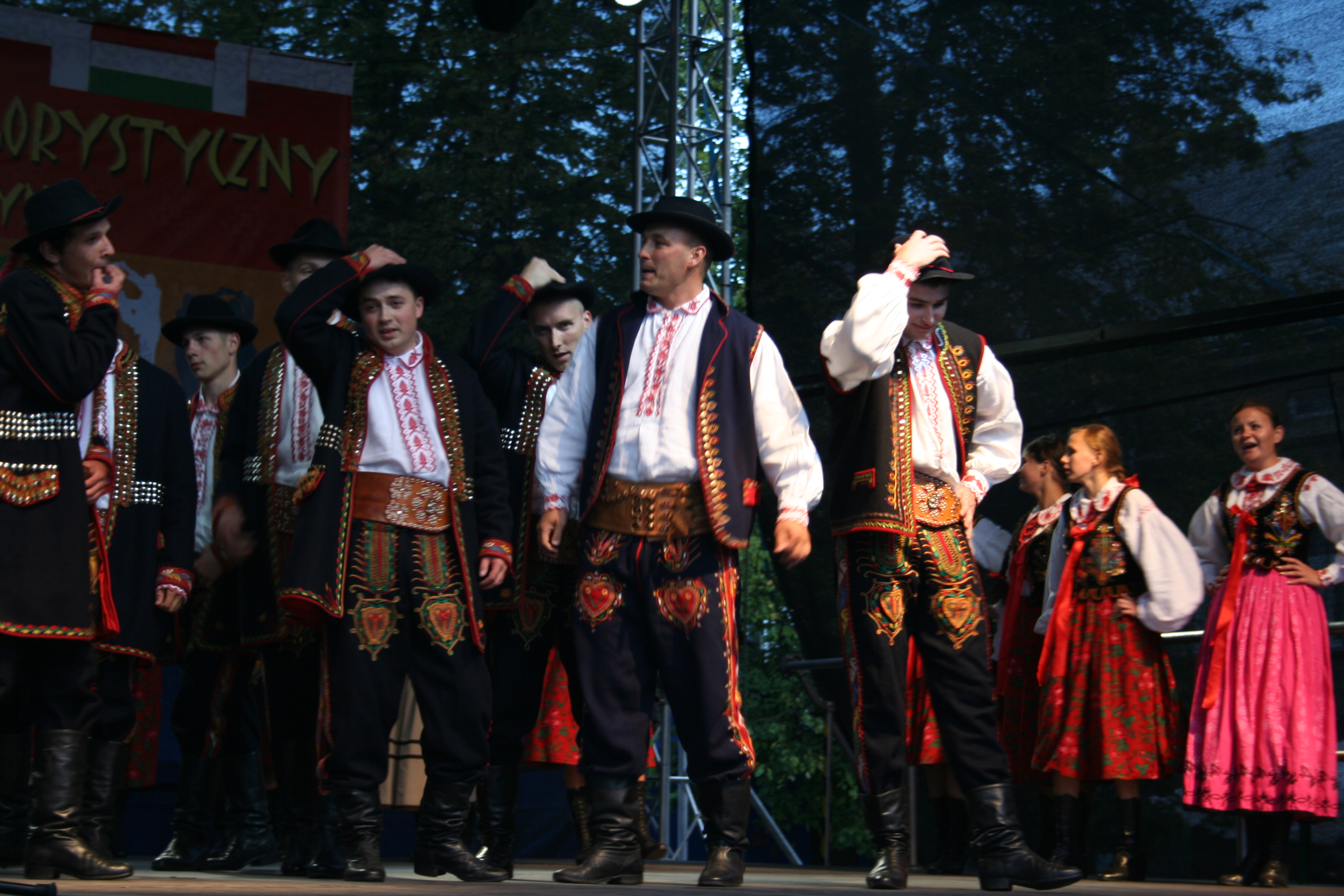
Lachy Sądeckie are a group of ethnic Poles who live in southern Lesser Poland

Even though first half of the 17th century was filled with wars, all major conflicts did not reach Lesser Poland, and the province continued to prosper, which was reflected in its castles and palaces, such as the enormous Krzyztopor. Apart from minor wars, such as Zebrzydowski Rebellion, and Kostka-Napierski Uprising, the province remained safe. Cossacks of the Khmelnytsky Uprising reached as far west as Zamość and Lwów, but did not enter Lesser Poland. The province did not witness other wars, such as Polish–Swedish War (1626–1629), Polish–Russian War (1609–1618), Polish–Ottoman War (1620–1621), and Smolensk War. Nevertheless, Lesser Poland's nobility took active part in these conflicts – Marina Mniszech, the daughter of Voivode of Sandomierz, Jerzy Mniszech, was wife of False Dmitriy I, as well as False Dmitriy II. Furthermore, Lesser Poland's lands, especially its northeastern part, became a base for Polish troops, fighting the Cossacks, and King John II Casimir Vasa often stayed in Lublin with his court, preparing military campaigns in Ukraine. The situation changed with the outbreak of the Russo-Polish War (1654–1667). In October 1655, the Russo-Cossack armies under Ivan Vyhovsky entered Eastern Lesser Poland, reaching the Vistula, and pillaging Lublin, Puławy, and Kazimierz Dolny. The invaders quickly retreated, but a few months later, Lesser Poland was flooded by the Swedes.

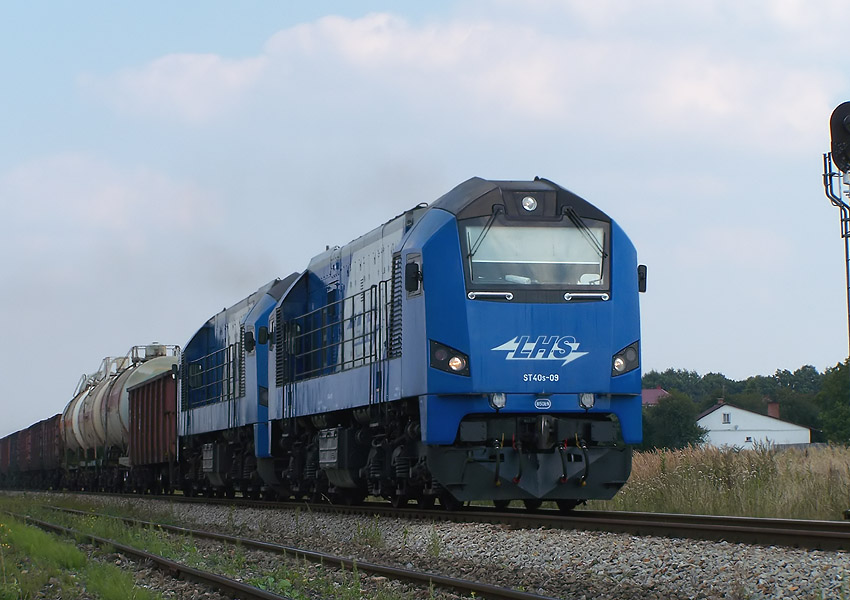
Broad Gauge Metallurgy Line

Swedish invasion of Poland had catastrophic consequences for the hitherto prosperous province. The attackers, supported by their allies from Transylvania, seized whole Lesser Poland, reaching as far south as Nowy Targ, Nowy Sącz, and Żywiec. All major cities were looted and burned, and some of them, like Radom, did not recover until the 19th century. The Swedes captured and pillaged Sandomierz (where they destroyed the Royal Castle, and after the invasion, the city never recovered), Opoczno, Lublin, Kazimierz Dolny Pilzno, Szydlow, Szydłowiec, Tarnów, Kielce, Kraśnik, and Kraków. The invaders seized the capital of Lesser Poland after a short siege, and their occupation of the province was confirmed after their victories in the Battle of Wojnicz, and the Battle of Golab. In those years, one of the most important and symbolic events in the history of the nation took place in Lesser Poland. It was the Siege of Jasna Góra, which, according to some accounts, turned the course of the war. Furthermore, following the Treaty of Radnot, Lesser Poland was invaded in January 1657 by George II Rákóczi, whose troops caused more destruction. Foreign armies were not chased out of Lesser Poland until 1657, Kraków itself was recaptured on 18 August 1657. After these invasions, the province was ruined, with hundreds of villages, towns and cities burned. The population decreased (the urban population by nearly half), the peasantry starved, and like other parts of the Commonwealth, Lesser Poland was devastated. The period of peace lasted for about forty years, when in 1700, another major conflict, the Great Northern War began. Lesser Poland once again became a battleground, with Battle of Kliszów taking place there in 1702, and the Sandomierz Confederation formed in 1704.

After the conflict, Lesser Poland began a recovery, which was hampered by several other factors. Province's cities frequently burned (Lublin 1719, Nowy Targ 1784, Nowy Sącz, Dukla 1758, Wieliczka 1718, Miechów 1745, Drzewica), there also were numerous outbreaks of plagues and typhus (in 1707–1708, some 20,000 died in Kraków and its area)

Lesser Poland was one of main centers of the Bar Confederation. On 21 June 1786 in Kraków, local confederation was announced, and on the same day Voievode of Kraków, Michal Czarnocki, urged his citizens to join the movement. Soon afterwards, Kraków was captured by the Russian troops, and the center of Lesser Poland's insurgency moved to the mountainous south – areas around Dukla and Nowy Sącz. During the Confederation, several battles and skirmishes took place there. In 1770, after the Battle of Iwonicz, the Russians ransacked Biecz. The movement ended in 1772, and its decline was connected with the Partitions of Poland. Another local center of the movement was Jasna Góra Monastery in Częstochowa, which was defended by Kazimierz Pulaski for almost two years (1770–1772).

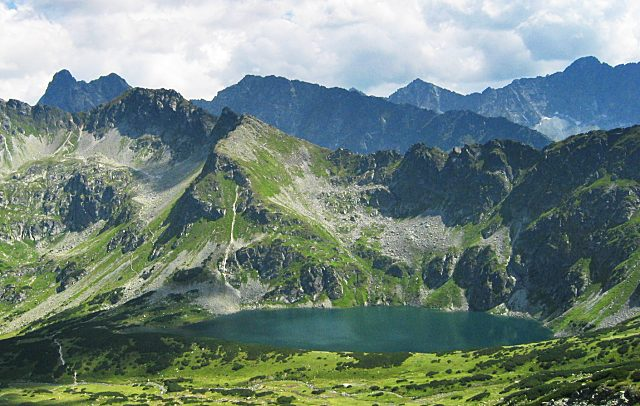
Czarny Staw (Black Pond) in the High Tatras

=== Partitions of Poland (1772–1918) ===
The Partitions of Poland began earlier in Lesser Poland than in other provinces of the country. In 1769, Austrian Empire annexed a small territory of Spisz, and next year, the towns of Czorsztyn, Nowy Sącz and Nowy Targ. In 1771, the Russians and the Prussians agreed on the first partition of the country, and in early 1772, Austrian Emperor Maria Theresa decided to join the two powers. In the first partition of the Commonwealth, the Austrians seized the territory which would later be called Galicia, and which included southwestern corner of Lesser Poland (south of the Vistula river), with Żywiec, Tarnów, and Biecz, but without major urban centers of the province, such as Kraków, Sandomierz, Radom, Lublin, Częstochowa, and Kielce.

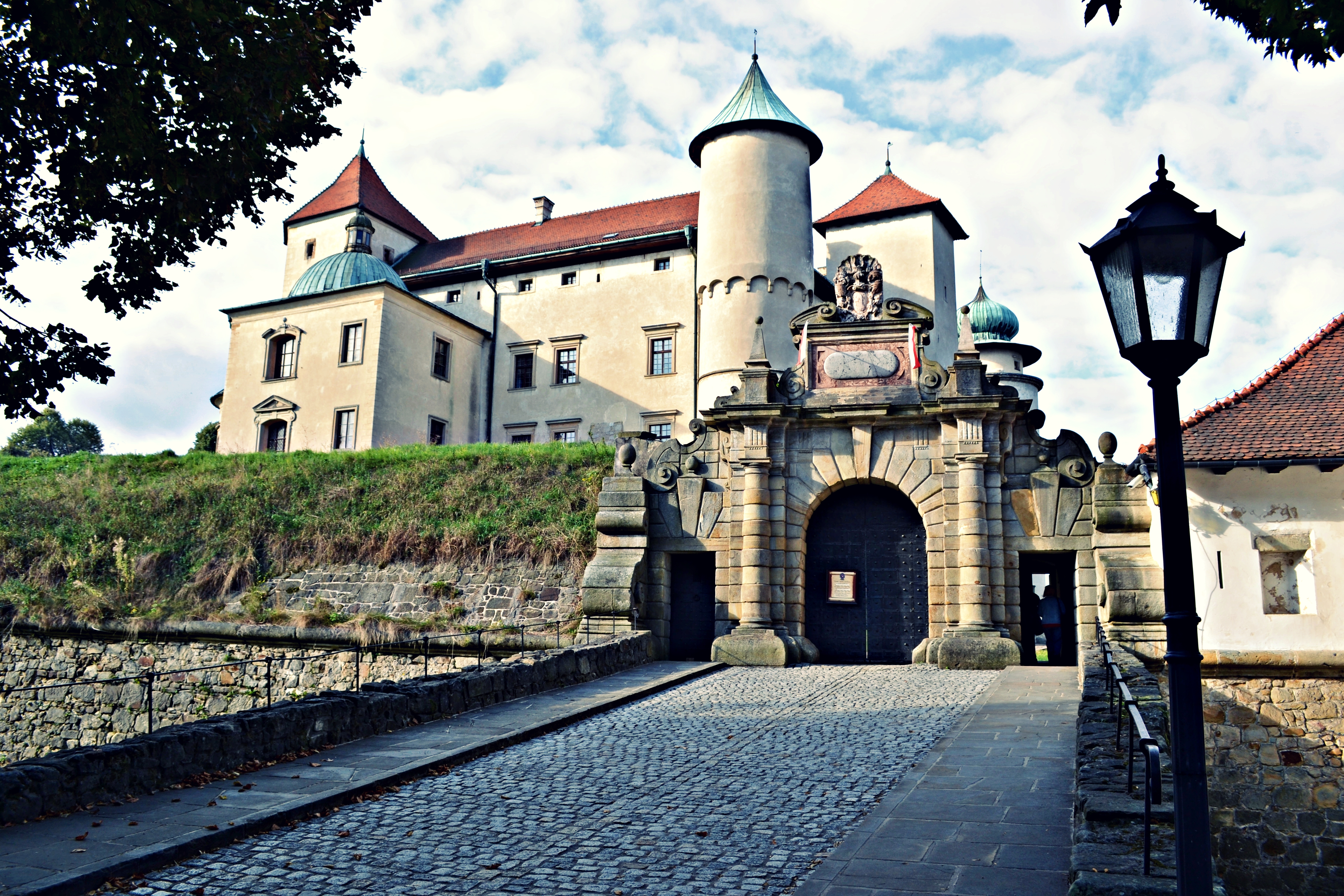
Nowy Wiśnicz

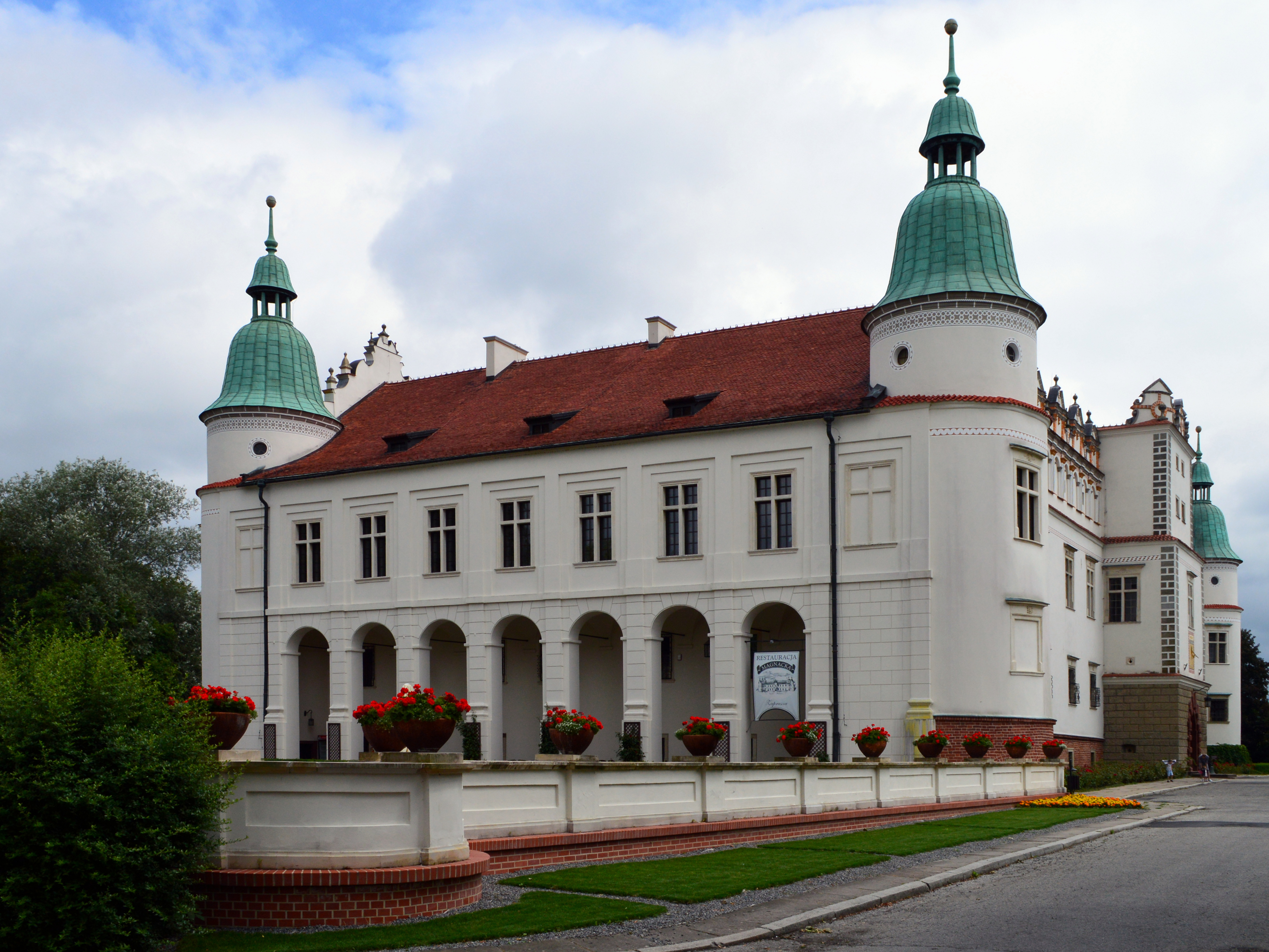
Baranów Sandomierski

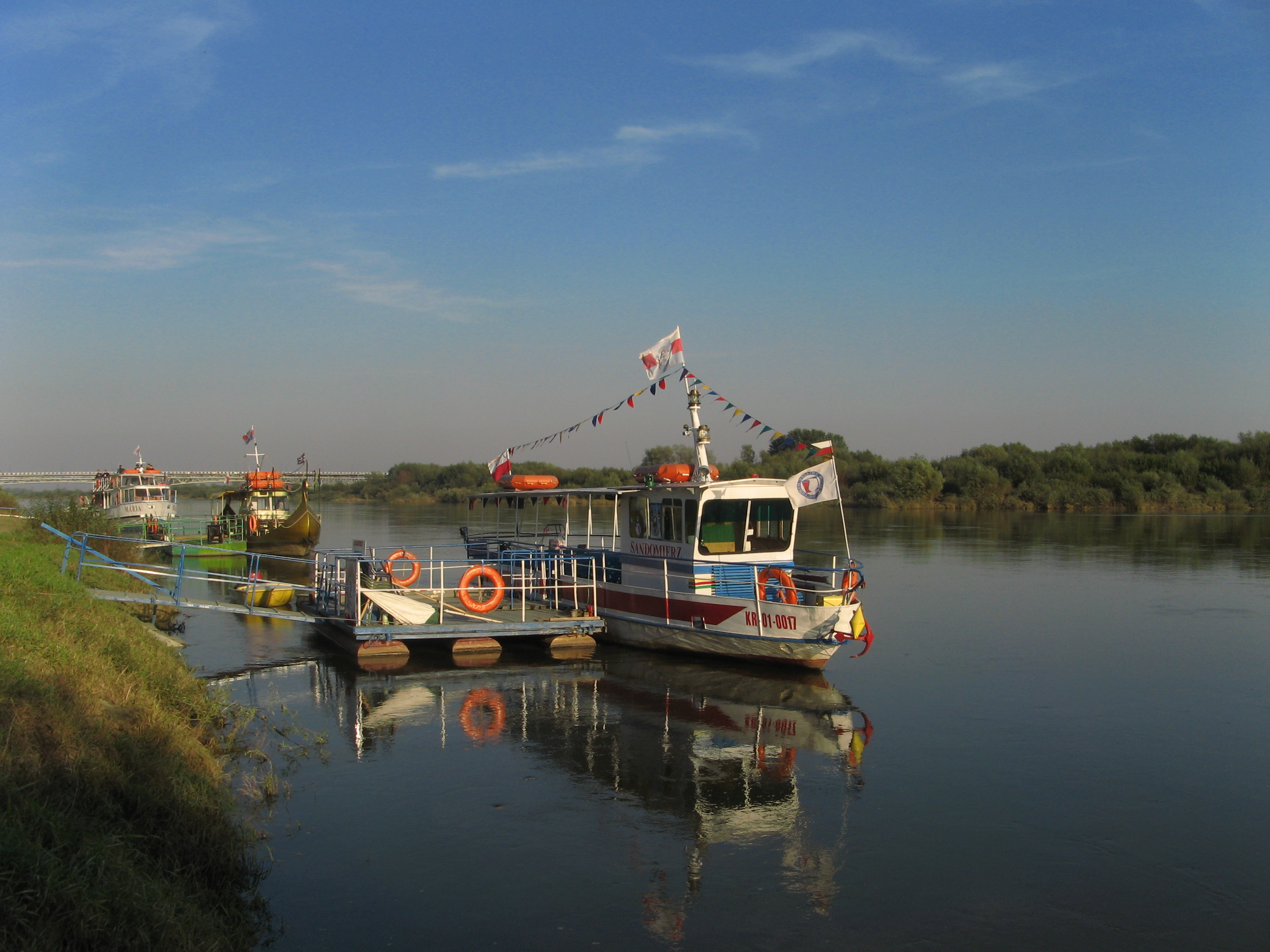
Vistula in Sandomierz

Second Partition of Poland (1793) did not result in significant changes of boundaries in the area, as the Austrian Empire did not participate in it. However, the Prussians moved on, and in 1793 they annexed northwestern corner of the province, together with the city of Częstochowa, and its vicinity, which became part of the newly created province of South Prussia. Therefore, in late 1793, Lesser Poland was already divided between three countries – Austrian Empire (south of the Vistula), Kingdom of Prussia (Częstochowa and northwestern corner), and still existing Commonwealth. After the Third Partition (1795), most of Lesser Poland was annexed by Austria, with all major cities. Prussia managed to seize a small, western part of the province, with the towns of Siewierz, Zawiercie, Będzin, and Myszków, calling this land New Silesia, while the Austrians decided to name newly acquired lands of northern Lesser Poland West Galicia. In 1803, West Galicia was merged with Kingdom of Galicia and Lodomeria, but retained some autonomy. Lesser Poland was one of major centers of Polish resistance against the occupiers. On 24 March 1794 in Kraków, Tadeusz Kościuszko announced the general insurrection (see Kościuszko Uprising), mobilising all able males of Lesser Poland. Two weeks later, Battle of Racławice took place, ending with a Polish victory. The uprising was suppressed by combined Prusso – Russian forces, and among battles fought in Lesser Poland, there is Battle of Szczekociny.

During Napoleonic Wars, the Duchy of Warsaw was created by Napoleon Bonaparte out of Polish lands which had been granted to Prussia in the Partitions. In 1809, after the Polish–Austrian War, and the Treaty of Schönbrunn, the Duchy was expanded, when northern Lesser Poland was added to its territory (with Kielce, Radom, and Lublin). Following the Congress of Vienna, Duchy of Warsaw was turned into Russian-ruled Congress Poland, and historical capital of the province, Kraków, was turned into Free City of Kraków, which also included the towns of Trzebinia, Chrzanów, Jaworzno, and Krzeszowice. In Congress Poland, the lands of Lesser Poland were initially divided between four palatinates – Palatinate of Kraków (with capital in Kielce), Palatinate of Sandomierz (with capital in Radom), Palatinate of Lublin, and Palatinate of Podlasie (with capital in Siedlce), (see also Administrative division of Congress Poland). Later, the palatinates were turned into governorates. Thus, Russian part of Lesser Poland was divided into Kielce Governorate, Lublin Governorate, Radom Governorate, Siedlce Governorate, and Piotrków Governorate (western counties, with Częstochowa and industrial area of Zagłębie Dąbrowskie). Borders of these administrative units did not reflect historical boundaries of the province.

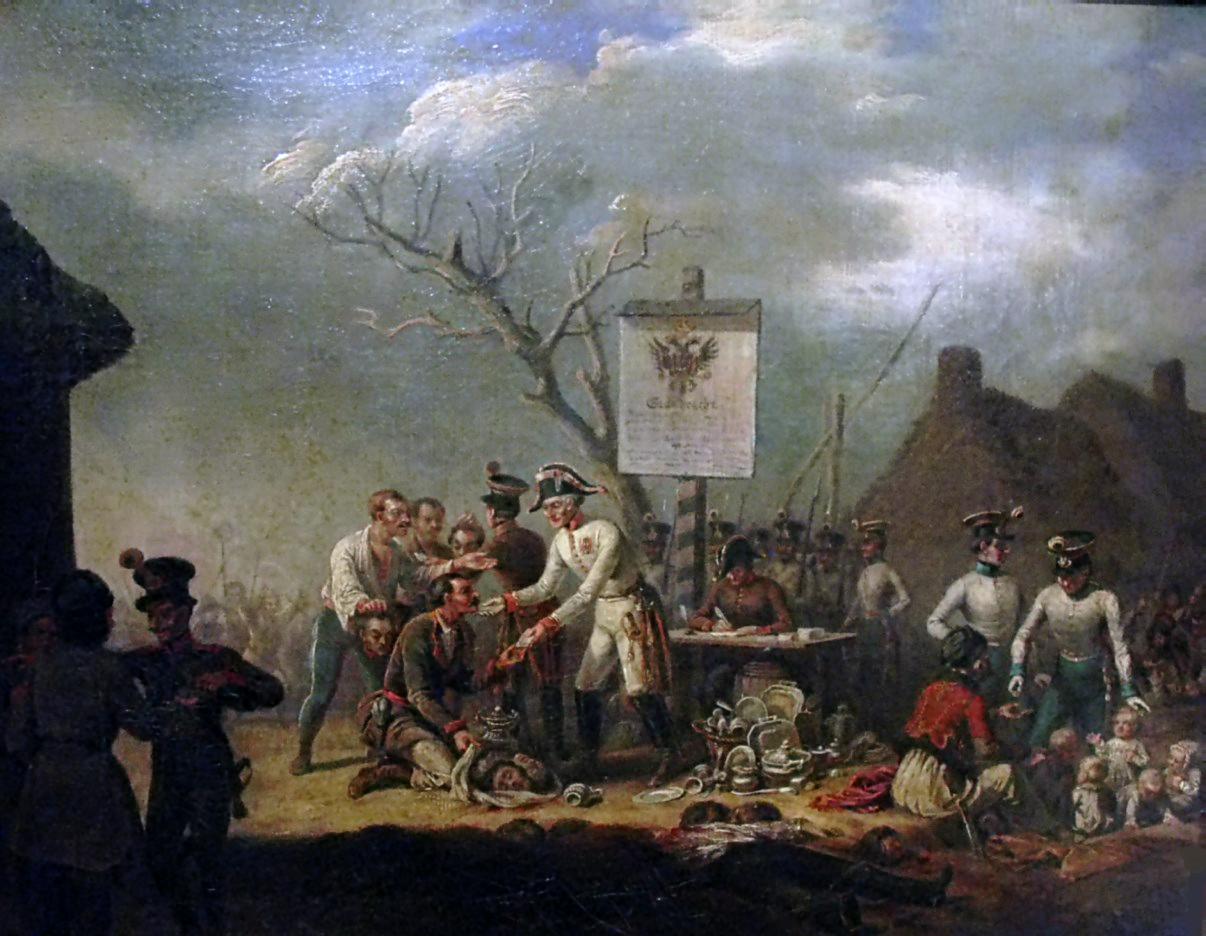
"Peasant war" by Jan Lewicki (1795–1871)

Most of the November Uprising, which began in 1830, missed Lesser Poland, as major battles took place in the area around Warsaw. In early 1831, when Russian forces advanced into Congress Poland, some skirmishes took place in northern counties of the province – at Puławy, Kurow, and Kazimierz Dolny. In early 1846, a group of Polish patriots attempted a failed uprising in the Free City of Kraków. The insurrection was quickly suppressed by the Austrian troops, and as a result, the Free City was annexed by the Austrian Empire. In the same year, Austrian part of Lesser Poland was witness to a massacre of Polish nobility by the peasantry, known as Galician slaughter. The peasants, led by Jakub Szela, murdered about 1000 nobles, and destroyed about 500 manors. These events took place in three counties – Sanok, Jasło and Tarnów.

Northern and central Lesser Poland (the part of the province which was taken by the Russian Empire) was one of the main centers of the January Uprising (1863–1864). In the first days of the insurrection, skirmishes with the Russian Army took place in such towns, as Łuków, Kraśnik, Szydłowiec, Bodzentyn, and Suchedniów. Since the Poles were poorly armed, the Russians did not have major problems with them, and soon afterwards, the insurrectionists decided to organize military camps. Among biggest camps in Lesser Poland, there were Ojców (3000 soldiers), and Wąchock, where Marian Langiewicz gathered up to 1500 people. The uprising died out by early spring of 1864, and among counties where it continued for the longest time, was the extreme northeastern corner of Lesser Poland, around Łuków, where reverend Stanisław Brzóska was active. Since Russian military supremacy was crushing, the Poles were forced to limit their actions to guerrilla warfare. Among the biggest battles which took place in Lesser Poland there are: Battle of Szydłowiec (23 January 1863); Battle of Miechów (17 February 1863); Battle of Małogoszcz (24 February 1863); Battle of Staszów (17 February 1863); Battle of Pieskowa Skała (4 March 1863); two Battles of Opatów (25 November 1863, 21 February 1864).

As a result of their support of the failed insurrection, several Lesser Poland's towns lost their charters and were turned into villages. Among them were Kraśnik, Bodzentyn, Opatów, Iłża, Małogoszcz, Wąchock, Busko-Zdrój, Jędrzejów, Cmielow, Zwoleń, Drzewica, Wierzbica, Czeladź, Kazimierz Dolny, Wolborz, Stopnica, Daleszyce, Wiślica, Pajęczno, Lipsko, Pacanów, Ożarów, Wolbrom, Proszowice, Nowe Miasto Korczyn, Włoszczowa, Przysucha, Opole Lubelskie.

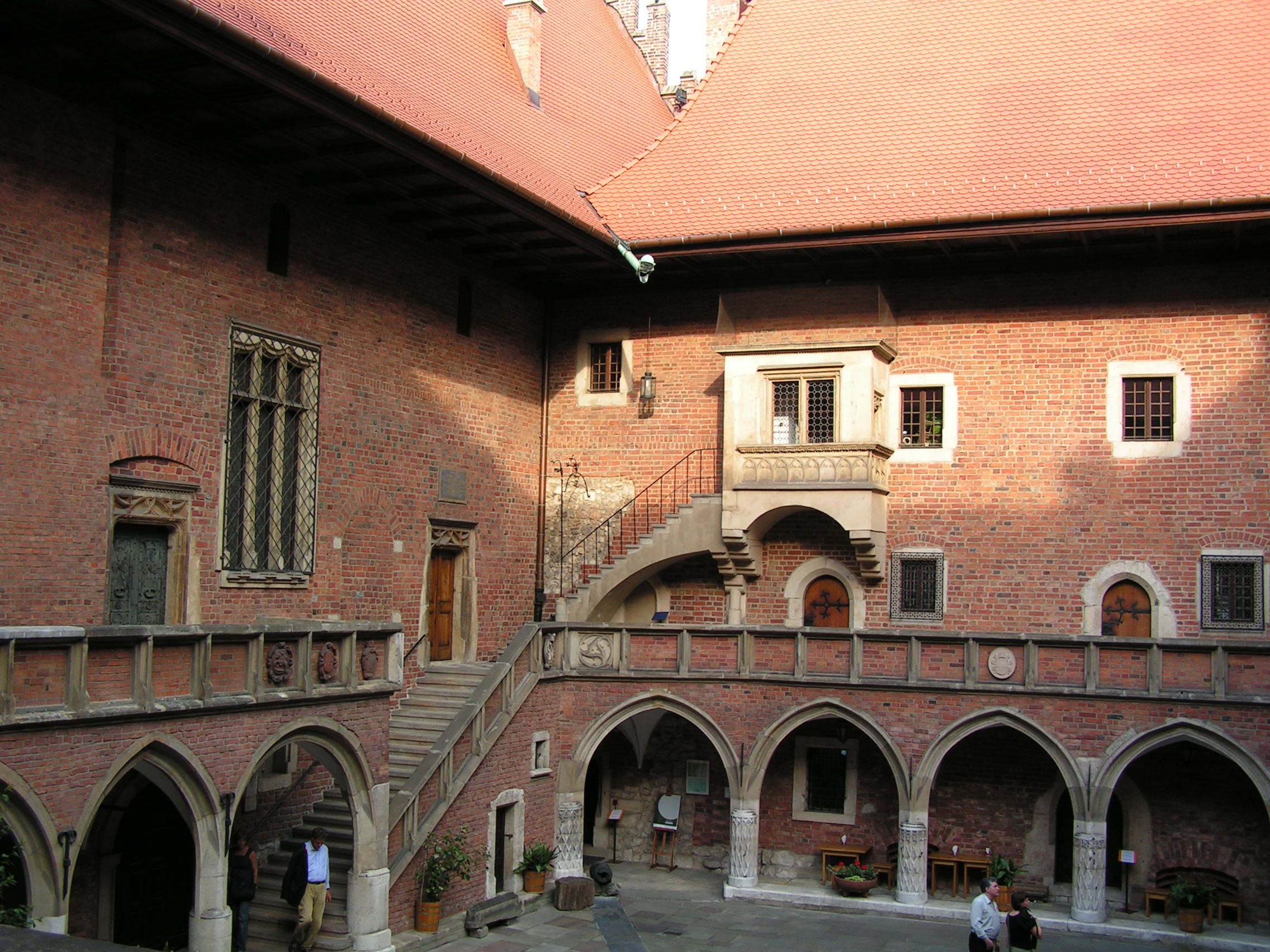
In the 19th century, Kraków's Jagiellonian University was a major center of Polish science and culture

In the late 19th and early 20th centuries, Lesser Poland remained one of the centers of Polish culture, especially the city of Kraków, where Jagiellonian University was one of only two Polish-language colleges of that period (the other one was University of Lwów). Another significant center of national culture was the town of Puławy, where in the late 18th century, a local palace owned by Czartoryski family became a museum of Polish national memorabilia and a major cultural and political centre. A number of prominent artists, both representing Romanticism, and Positivism was born in Lesser Poland, including Wincenty Pol (born in Lublin), Stefan Żeromski (born near Kielce), Aleksander Świętochowski (born near Łuków in extreme northeast corner of Lesser Poland), Walery Przyborowski (born near Kielce), Piotr Michałowski, Helena Modjeska, Henryk Wieniawski (born in Lublin), Leon Wyczółkowski (born near Siedlce), Juliusz Kossak (born in Nowy Wiśnicz), Józef Szujski (born in Tarnów). In the early 20th century, Lesser Poland, especially its part which belonged to Austria-Hungary, was a center of a cultural movement called Young Poland. Many artists associated with the movement were born in Lesser Poland, with the most prominent including Władysław Orkan, Kazimierz Przerwa-Tetmajer, Xawery Dunikowski, Jacek Malczewski, Józef Mehoffer, and Stanisław Wyspiański.

Since Austrian part of Poland enjoyed a wide autonomy, the province of Galicia, whose western part was made of Lesser Poland, became a hotbed of Polish conspirational activities. In anticipation of a future war, Galician Poles, with help of their brethren from other parts of the divided country, created several paramilitary organizations, such as Polish Rifle Squads, and Riflemen's Association. The capital of Lesser Poland, Kraków, was a key center of pro-independence movements, with such individuals, as Józef Piłsudski, being actively involved in those activities. In August 1914, after the outbreak of World War I, Pilsudski's Legions crossed the Austrian – Russian border north of Kraków, and entered Congress Poland. However, the Pilsudski and his soldiers were disappointed to see that the inhabitants of Kielce did not welcome them with joy. The division of Lesser Poland was more visible than ever.

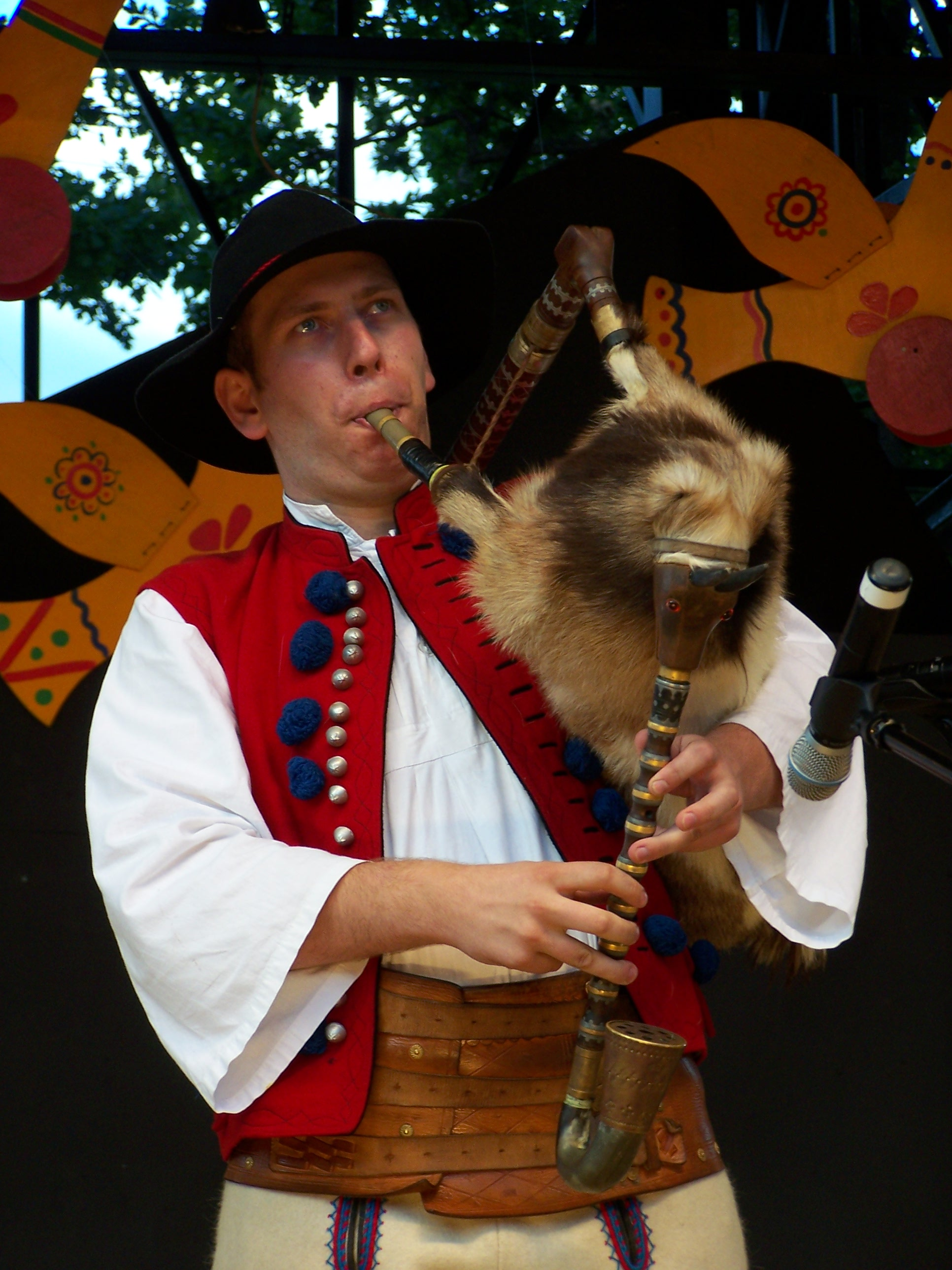
Gorals from Beskidy

During World War I, Lesser Poland became one of main theaters of the Eastern Front. Russian push into the territory of Austria – Hungary resulted in the Battle of Galicia. Among other major battles which took place in Lesser Poland, there are the Battle of the Vistula River, and the Gorlice-Tarnów Offensive. After Russian troops had retreated east, whole province was under control of the Austrians and the Germans, and northern Lesser Poland was part of the German-sponsored Kingdom of Poland (1916–1918). In later stages of the conflict, the divided province once again became a center of Polish independence movement. An independent Polish government was re-proclaimed in northern Lesser Poland's city of Lublin, on 7 November 1918. Soon afterwards, it formed the basis of the new government of the country. In other parts of the province, other governments were formed – Polish Liquidation Commission in Kraków, also the short-lived Republic of Tarnobrzeg.

The division of Lesser Poland along the Vistula river, which lasted from 1772 until 1918, is visible even today. For more than 100 years, southern Lesser Poland (Kraków, Tarnów, Biala Krakowska, and Nowy Sącz) was administered by Austria, while northern, larger part of the province (Częstochowa, Sosnowiec, Kielce, Radom, Lublin, Sandomierz) was forcibly part of the Russian Empire. Inhabitants of Austrian part of Poland enjoyed limited autonomy, with Polish language institutions, such as Jagiellonian University. At the same time, Russian-controlled Poland was subject to Russification. As a result of decades of this division, most inhabitants of the areas stolen by Russia are not aware of their Lesser Poland's heritage. Furthermore, current administrative boundaries of the country still reflect the defunct border between the former Russian and Austria–Hungarian Empires.

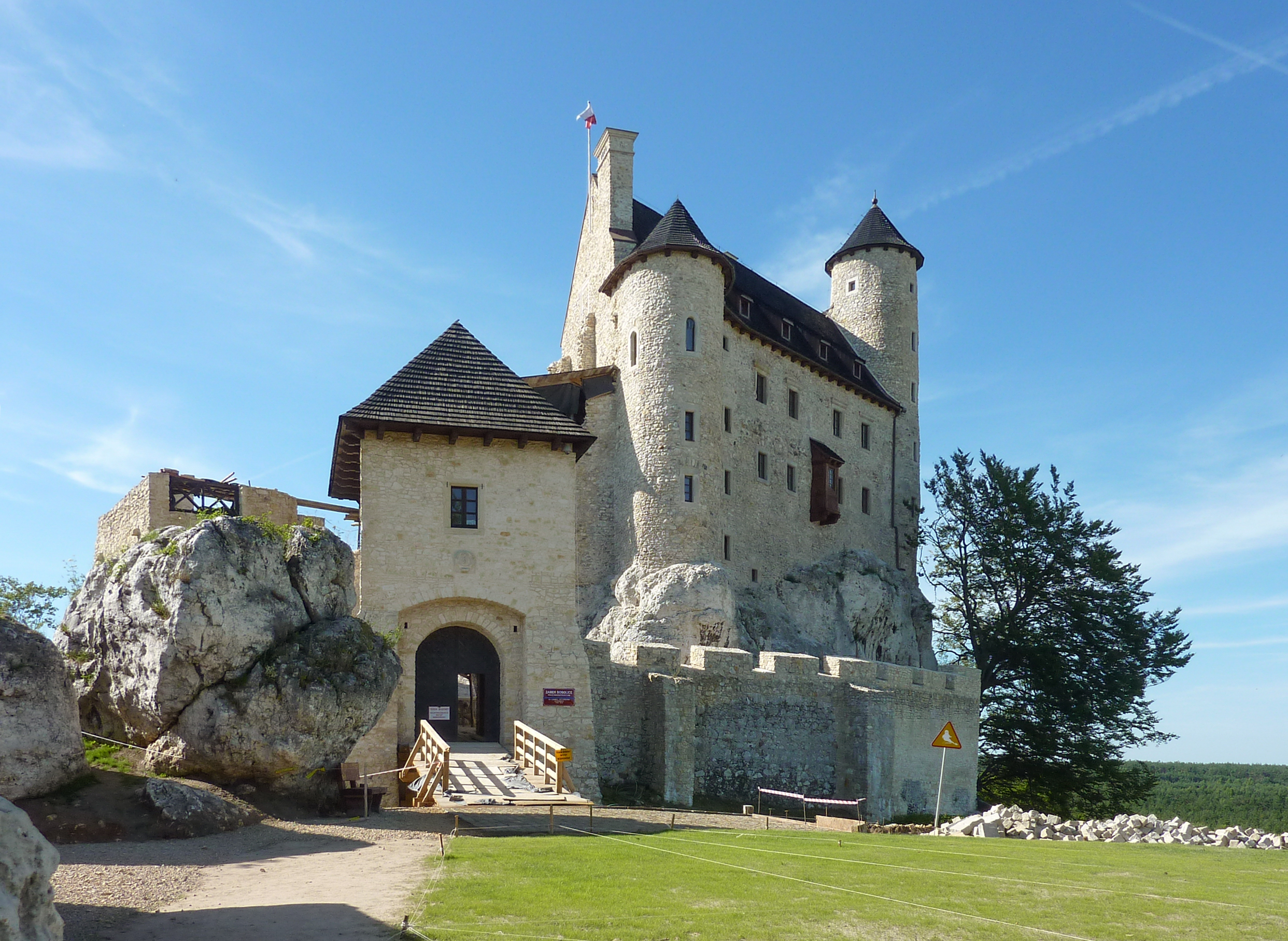
Castle of Bobolice

=== Interwar Poland (1918–1939) ===
In 1918, when Second Polish Republic was created, whole historical Lesser Poland became part of restored Poland. The historical area of the province was divided between four voivodeships: Kraków Voivodeship (whole), Kielce Voivodeship (whole), Lwów Voivodeship (northwestern corner), and Lublin Voivodeship (western part). Furthermore, in the counties of central Lesser Poland, another administrative unit, Sandomierz Voivodeship was planned, but due to the outbreak of World War II, it was never created. Boundaries between two major Lesser Poland voivodeships – Kraków, and Kielce, were the same as pre-1914 boundaries of Austria-Hungary, and Russia. Nevertheless, in the interbellum period, the notion of Lesser Poland was frequently associated only with former Austrian province of Galicia. Therefore, Western Galicia to the San river, was called Western Lesser Poland, while Eastern Galicia, east of the San, with the city of Lwów (Lviv), was called Eastern Lesser Poland (voivodeships of Tarnopol, Stanisławów, and Lwów). According to a Polish historian Jan Pisuliński, using the term Eastern Lesser Poland to denomine Eastern Galicia is incorrect, as it has no historical justification, being only a designation of nationalist and propaganda significance (similarly to analogous term Western Ukraine used at the same time by the Ukrainian side), which served in the 1920s and 1930s to make a stronger connection of the area between rivers of San and Zbruch with the Polish state and to emphasize the allegedly indigenously Polish nature of that region.

In late 1918, Lesser Poland emerged as one of main centers of fledgling Polish administration and independence movement. According to historian Kazimierz Banburski of Tarnów's District Museum, Tarnów was the first Polish city which became independent, after 123 years of oppression. On 31 October 1918, at 8 am, Tarnów's inhabitants began disarming demoralized Austrian soldiers, and after three hours, the city was completely in Polish hands. On 28 October 1918, Polish Liquidation Committee was created in Kraków. A few days later, socialist peasants founded the Republic of Tarnobrzeg. In the night of 6/7 November 1918, Polish People's Republic was proclaimed in Lublin, by Ignacy Daszynski and other activists. In 1919, the legislative election took place in Lesser Poland without major problems.

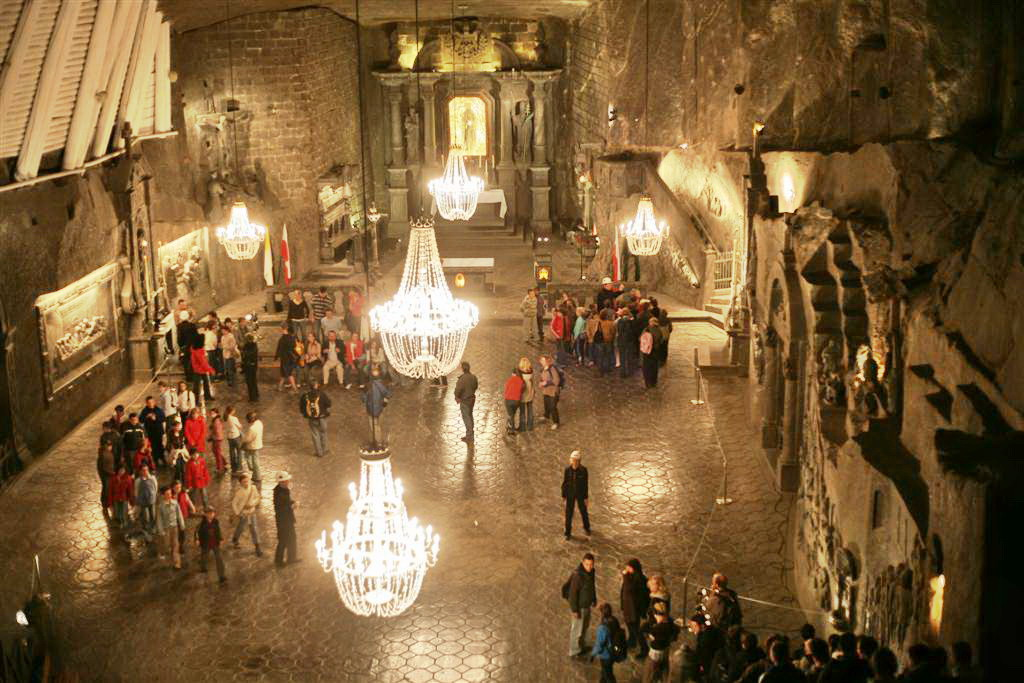
Wieliczka Salt Mine, a UNESCO World Heritage Site

At that time Lesser Poland, like other provinces of the country, faced several problems. Even though major post-World War I conflicts (such as Polish–Soviet War) did not take place there, it suffered from unemployment, overpopulation, and poverty, especially in towns and countryside. Furthermore, Polish government had to connect parts of the hitherto divided country. There was no direct rail link between Kraków, and Kielce, Radom, and Lublin, and until 1934, when line from Kraków to Tunel was opened, all travelers had to go via Sosnowiec – Maczki. Lack of rail communication between former Austrian and former Russian parts of Lesser Poland is visible even today. Between Kraków and Dęblin, there are only two rail bridges along the Vistula. Residents of the province tried to improve their conditions using legal means, but when it turned out to be impossible, they took to fighting (1923 Kraków riot, 1937 peasant strike in Poland). As if to exacerbate the desperate situation, Lesser Poland witnessed a catastrophic flood in 1934, after which the government decided to construct dams on local rivers.

Even though Lesser Poland's countryside was almost exclusively Polish, its towns and cities were inhabited by numerous Jews, whose communities were very vibrant. In Kraków, Jews made 25% of the population, in Lublin – 31%, in Kielce – 30%, and in Radom – 32%. Apart from the Jews, and Gypsies scattered in the south, there were no other significant national minorities in interbellum Lesser Poland.

Since Lesser Poland was safely located in the middle of the country, away from both German and Soviet border, in the mid-1930s Polish government initiated one of the most ambitious project of the Second Polish Republic – Central Industrial Region, which was located almost exclusively in Lesser Poland. Even though the project was never completed, several plants were constructed, both in Old-Polish Industrial Region, and in other counties of the province. The brand new city of Stalowa Wola was established in dense forests, around a steel mill. In the late 1930s, Lesser Poland was quickly changing, as construction of several factories, and job opportunities caused influx of rural inhabitants to the towns. Such towns, as Dębica, Starachowice, Puławy, or Kraśnik, quickly grew, with their population rising. Earlier, in 1927, Lesser Poland's Dęblin became a major center of Polish aviation, when Polish Air Force Academy was opened there, and in Mielec, PZL Mielec was opened, which was the largest aerospace manufacturer in Poland. Central Industrial Region, however, did not affect western counties of Lesser Poland, which had already been urbanized and industrialized (Biala Krakowska, Żywiec, Kraków, Jaworzno, Zagłębie Dąbrowskie, Zawiercie, and Częstochowa). The government of Poland planned further investments, such as a major East – West rail line, linking Volhynia, and Upper Silesia, but they never materialized. Desperate situation and lack of jobs caused thousands of inhabitants of Lesser Poland (especially from its southern part) to leave their land, mostly for the United States of America, but also Brazil, and Canada.

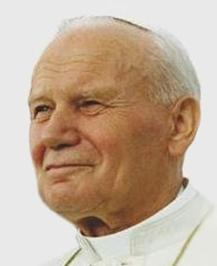
Pope John Paul II was born in Wadowice, Lesser Poland, in 1920

Lesser Poland remained a center of Polish culture, with Kraków's Jagiellonian University, AGH University of Science and Technology, and Catholic University of Lublin, which was opened in 1918. Several important figures of interbellum political, military, and cultural life of Poland were born in Lesser Poland. Among them were Wincenty Witos, Władysław Sikorski, Eugeniusz Kwiatkowski, Józef Dowbor-Muśnicki, Józef Haller, Władysław Belina-Prażmowski, Tadeusz Kutrzeba, Feliks Koneczny, Stefan Żeromski, Tadeusz Peiper, Maria Pawlikowska-Jasnorzewska, Witold Gombrowicz, Jan Kiepura, Stefan Jaracz. In 1920, in Lesser Poland's town of Wadowice, Karol Wojtyla, the future Pope John Paul II, was born.

=== World War II ===
On 1 September 1939, armed forces of Nazi Germany attacked Poland (see: Invasion of Poland). Lesser Poland, due to its proximity to the then-border with Germany, became a battleground on the first day of the invasion. The Germans attacked the province both in its northwest (area west of Częstochowa), and in the south (Podhale), along the border with Slovakia, which also participated in the invasion.

Lesser Poland was defended by the following Polish armies:

- Karpaty Army, which covered southern, mountainous border of the province,
- Kraków Army, guarding western part of the province, together with adjacent Polish part of Upper Silesia. Later in the course of war it joined the Karpaty Army, forming the Lesser Poland Army (Armia Małopolska),
- Łódź Army, which protected extreme northwestern corner of the province, north of Częstochowa,
- Prusy Army, which was main reserve of the Commander in Chief, and was concentrated in central and northern Lesser Poland (between Radom and Kielce),
- Lublin Army, improvised after 4 September, and concentrated in the area of Lublin and Sandomierz in northEastern Lesser Poland.

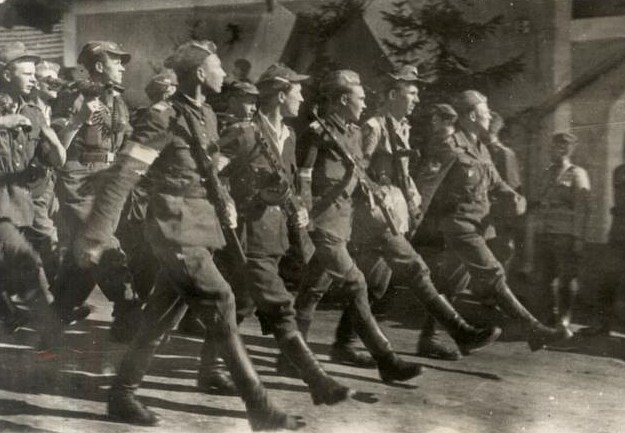
Soldiers of Holy Cross Mountains Brigade in parade 1945

After a few days the Battle of the Border was lost, and forces of German Army Group South advanced deep into Lesser Poland's territory. Polish troops resisted fiercely, and among major battles in initial stages of the war, which took place in Lesser Poland, there are Battle of Mokra, Battle of Jordanów, and Battle of Węgierska Górka. By 6 September, Polish forces were in general retreat and Marshal of Poland Edward Rydz-Śmigły ordered all troops to fall back to the secondary lines of defences at the Vistula and San Rivers. German units entered Częstochowa on 3 September (where on the next day they murdered hundreds of civilians), Kielce on 5 September, Kraków on 6 September, and Radom on 8 September (see also Battle of Radom). Within a week, almost whole Lesser Poland was under Nazi occupation. Northeastern part of the province, the area of Lublin, was held by the Poles until 17 September, but eventually, and after fierce battles (see Battle of Tomaszów Lubelski), all Lesser Poland was firmly under Nazi control. First draft of Molotov–Ribbentrop Pact stipulated that northEastern Lesser Poland (east of the Vistula river) was to be occupied by the Soviet Union, and forces of the Red Army reached the area of Lublin after 20 September, but withdrew east on 28 September.

On 12 October 1939, upon a decree of Adolf Hitler, General Government, a separate region of the Greater German Reich was created, with Hans Frank as its Governor-General. Its capital was established in Kraków, and it covered most of the area of historical Lesser Poland, except for its western counties, which were directly incorporated into Nazi Germany's Upper Silesia Province (Będzin, Sosnowiec, Zawiercie, Biała, Żywiec, Chrzanów, Olkusz).

In Lesser Poland, like in all provinces of the occupied country, the Nazis ruled with savage brutality, killing hundreds of thousands of inhabitants, both Polish and Jewish (see: World War II crimes in Poland, Occupation of Poland (1939–1945), Holocaust in Nazi-occupied Poland, Nazi crimes against ethnic Poles, German AB-Aktion in Poland, Sonderaktion Krakau). The Auschwitz concentration camp, located at the border of Lesser Poland and Upper Silesia, was opened on 14 June 1940, and on 1 October 1941, the Germans opened Majdanek concentration camp on the outskirts of Lublin. The third concentration camp in Lesser Poland was in Kraków's district of Płaszów. In late 1939 and early 1940, in Lesser Poland's spa of Zakopane, and in Kraków, several Gestapo–NKVD Conferences took place, during which the mutual cooperation between Nazi Germany and Soviet Union was discussed.

Anti-Nazi resistance was particularly strong in Lesser Poland, and it was in the extreme northwestern corner of the province (around Opoczno), that armed struggle against the occupiers began in late 1939 and early 1940 (see Henryk Dobrzański). Structures of the Home Army were well-developed in the region. Lesser Poland's independent areas of the Home Army were located in Kraków, Kielce-Radom, and Lublin. During Operation Tempest in mid-1944, several Lesser Poland's towns were liberated, also uprising in Kraków was prepared, but never realized. Apart from the Home Army, other resistance groups were strong in the province, such as pro-Communist Armia Ludowa, peasant's Bataliony Chłopskie, and right-wing National Armed Forces, with its Holy Cross Mountains Brigade.

In all major Lesser Poland's cities, Jewish ghettos were opened, with the biggest ones in Kraków, and Lublin. At first the Nazis were planning to create a so-called "reservation" for European Jews, located around Lesser Poland's town of Nisko (see Nisko Plan), but they changed the plan, and decided to murder all Jews. Condemned to death, Jews in Lesser Poland took to fighting (see Częstochowa Ghetto Uprising), but their efforts failed. As a result of The Holocaust in Poland, once thriving and numerous Jewish population of Lesser Poland was decimated.

Germany operated several prisoner-of-war camps, including Stalag 301, Stalag 307, Stalag 359, Stalag 367, Stalag 369, Stalag 380, Stalag XII-C, Oflag 77, and multiple forced labour subcamps of Stalag VIII-B/344, for Polish, French, Belgian, Italian, Soviet, Dutch, Senegalese and other Allied POWs in the region.

In the summer of 1944, after Lvov–Sandomierz Offensive, Red Army pushed the Wehrmacht from Eastern Lesser Poland. The city of Lublin was captured by the Soviets on 22 July 1944, Stalowa Wola – on 1 August, and Sandomierz, on the left bank of the Vistula – on 18 August. The front line stabilized along the Vistula for about six months (with some bridgeheads on the western bank on the Vistula – see Battle of Studzianki), and in early 1945, Soviet Vistula–Oder Offensive began, which pushed Germans to the gates of Berlin. The Soviets entered Kielce on 15 January, Częstochowa – on 17 January, and Kraków on 19 January. On 27 January, the Red Army entered Sosnowiec. In took the Soviets much longer to clear the areas in the mountains – they did not enter Żywiec until 5 April 1945.

=== Post-World War II ===
Together with the Red Army, NKVD and Soviet authorities followed, whose purpose was to make Poland a Communist country, with a puppet government, formed as Polish Committee of National Liberation. Since 1 August 1944, the provisional government was officially headquartered in Lesser Poland's Lublin. Thousands of people took to the forests, to continue their fight for free Poland (see Anti-communist resistance in Poland (1944–46)). Lesser Poland again was one of the main centers of the resistance. Several skirmishes took place in the province, including Battle of Kuryłówka. The Communists did not hesitate to kill those rebels they captured (Public execution in Dębica (1946)), and by 1947, the resistance movement was crushed. The last Polish cursed soldier, Józef Franczak, was killed in 1963 near Świdnik in northEastern Lesser Poland. Also, all victims of the 1951 Mokotów Prison execution were members of Lesser Poland's branch of Freedom and Independence. Another well-known anti-Communist fighter from Lesser Poland is Józef Kuraś, who was active in the southern region of Podhale.

In early 1945, the lands of Lesser Poland were divided between three voivodeships – those of Kraków, Lublin, and Kielce. Since summer 1945, several counties were transferred to neighboring voivodeships – Eastern Lesser Poland (Dębica, Jasło, Mielec) became part of Rzeszów Voivodeship, while western counties of Będzin and Zawiercie were transferred to Katowice Voivodeship. In 1950, the city of Częstochowa became part of Katowice Voivodeship, and next year, the city of Bielsko-Biała was created out of Lesser Poland's Biala Krakowska, and Upper Silesia's Bielsko. The new city became part of Katowice Voivodeship. Lesser Poland was further divided in 1975, when territorial reform was carried out (see Voivodeships of Poland (1975–1988)). Counties were abolished, and several small voivodeships were created, in such Lesser Poland's towns and cities, as Tarnobrzeg, Tarnów, Nowy Sącz, Bielsko-Biała, Radom, Częstochowa, and Siedlce.

The government of Communist Poland invested in heavy industry, following the pre-1939 idea of Central Industrial Area. In Kraków, a new district of Nowa Huta was constructed in the 1950s. In Częstochowa and Zawiercie, the steelworks were significantly expanded, and in early 1970, the government initiated construction of Katowice Steelworks, which, despite its name, is located in Lesser Poland's Dąbrowa Górnicza. To connect Katowice Steelworks with Soviet plants, in late 1970s Broad Gauge Metallurgy Line was opened, which crossed Lesser Poland from west to east. Among other major factories, opened in Lesser Poland during Communist rule, there are:

- FSC Lublin, opened in 1951,
- FSC Star in Starachowice, opened in 1948, and based on earlier factory,
- PZL-Świdnik, opened in 1951,
- Zaklady Azotowe Puławy, opened in 1965,
- Połaniec Power Station, opened in 1979,
- Skawina Power Station, opened in 1957,
- Nowiny Cement Plant, opened in 1960,
- Kozienice Power Station, opened in 1973.

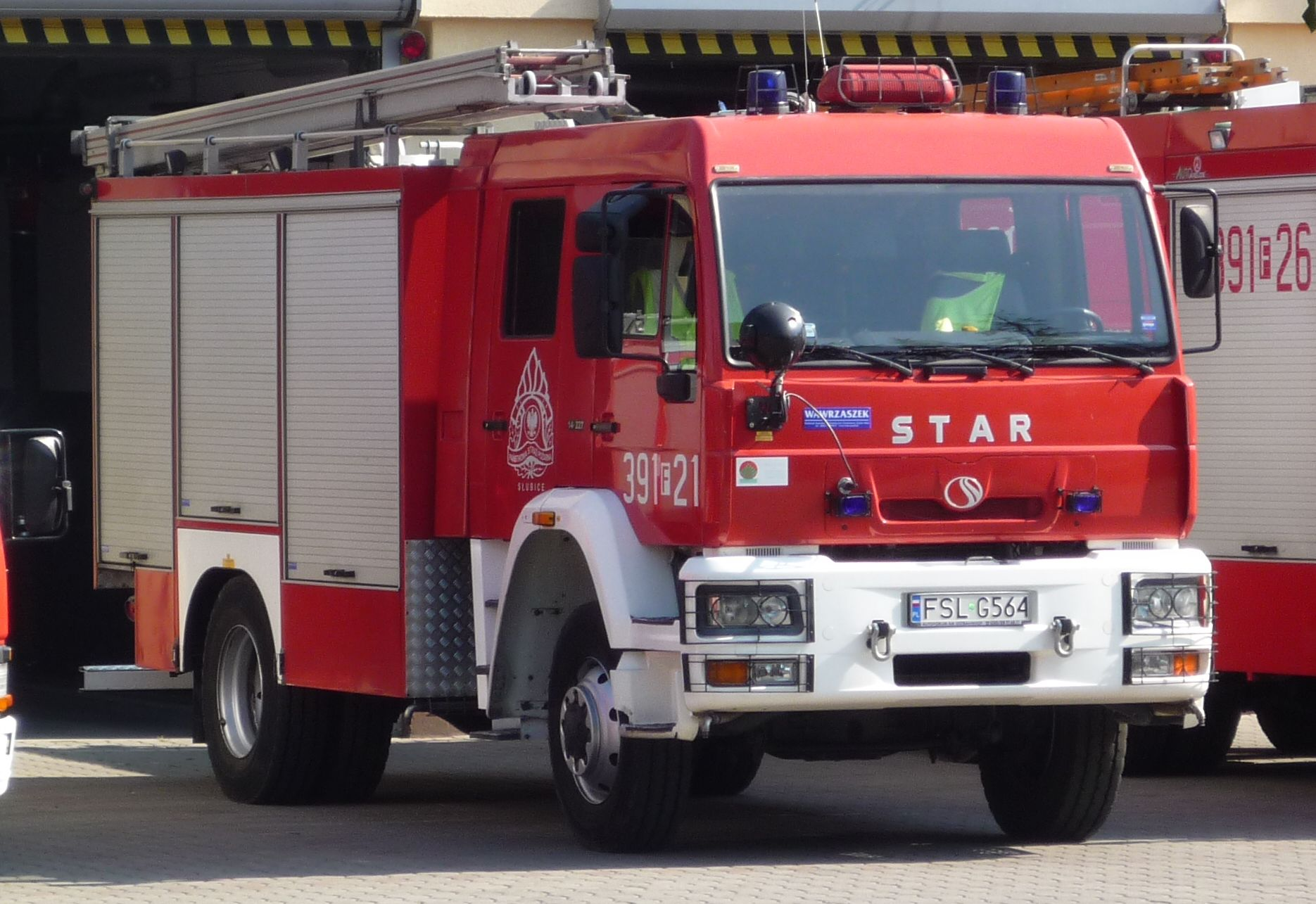
A fire engine made by FSC Star in Lesser Poland's Starachowice

Other Lesser Poland's major plants were significantly expanded after 1945, including Żywiec Brewery, Okocim Brewery, Fablok, Łucznik Arms Factory, FŁT-Kraśnik, Jaworzno Power Station, Siersza Power Plant, Huta Stalowa Wola, Janina Coal Mine, Sobieski Coal Mine, Zakłady Azotowe Tarnów-Mościce. Furthermore, in early 1950s significant sulfur resources were discovered in Tarnobrzeg, as a result of which Siarkopol company was founded, and the city of Tarnobrzeg quickly grew. In 1975, coal was discovered northeast of Lublin, and soon afterwards, Bogdanka Coal Mine and Piaski Coal Mine were opened.

Between 1971 and 1977, Central Trunk Line was opened, which goes along western boundary of the province, and which connects Kraków and Katowice, with Warsaw. In the early 1980s, construction of a highway between Kraków and Katowice began. The 61-kilometer road is now run by Stalexport Autostrada Małopolska, and is part of A4 highway.

Residents of Lesser Poland frequently protested against Communist government. Major centers of anti-Communist resistance were in Kraków, Nowa Huta, Radom, and Lublin. Among major protests that took place in the province were 1968 Polish political crisis (with Kraków as one of major centers of protests), June 1976 protests (in Radom), Lublin 1980 strikes, 31 August 1982 demonstrations in Poland (in several locations), 1988 Polish strikes (with Stalowa Wola as one of major centers). Several anti-Nazi, and anti-Communist leaders hailed from Lesser Poland: Jan Piwnik, Emil August Fieldorf, Leopold Okulicki, Ryszard Siwiec, Stanisław Pyjas, Hieronim Dekutowski, Andrzej Gwiazda, Andrzej Czuma.

A number of key personalities of Communist government were born in Lesser Poland, including Józef Cyrankiewicz, Bolesław Bierut, Edward Gierek, Wojciech Jaruzelski, Czesław Kiszczak, Stanisław Kania, Hilary Minc, Edward Ochab, Michał Rola-Żymierski, Józef Oleksy.

Among prominent personalities of Polish cultural life of the 20th century, who were born in Lesser Poland, there are: Xawery Dunikowski, Witold Gombrowicz, Gustaw Herling-Grudziński, Sławomir Mrożek, Tadeusz Kantor, Jan Kanty Pawluśkiewicz, Marek Kondrat, Maria Pawlikowska-Jasnorzewska, Krzysztof Penderecki, Zbigniew Preisner, Leon Schiller, Jerzy Stuhr, Jan Sztaudynger, Grzegorz Turnau, Jerzy Turowicz.

=== Local Government Reorganization Act (1998) ===
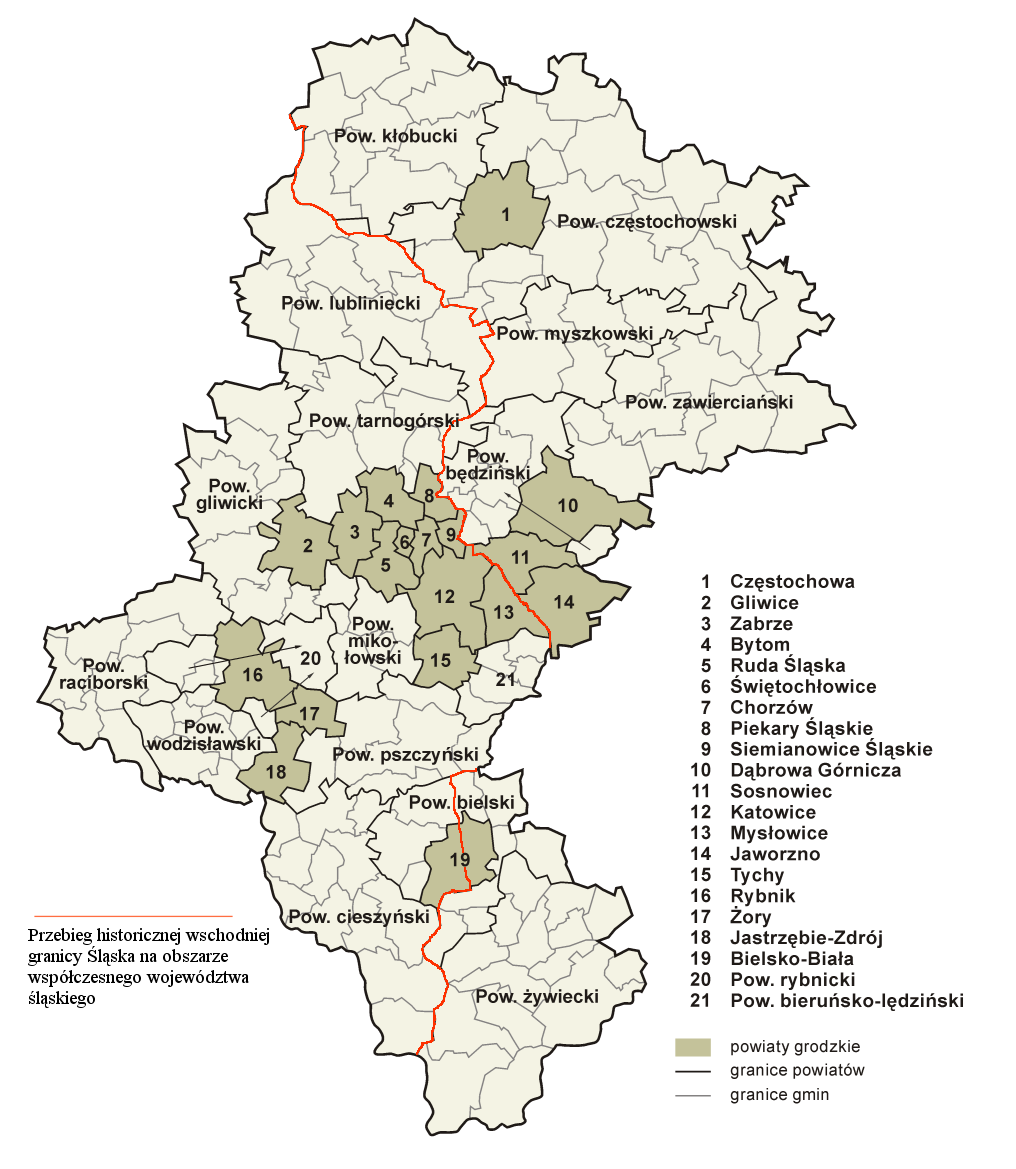
Boundary between Lesser Poland and Upper Silesia (red line) on the territory of current Silesian Voivodeship

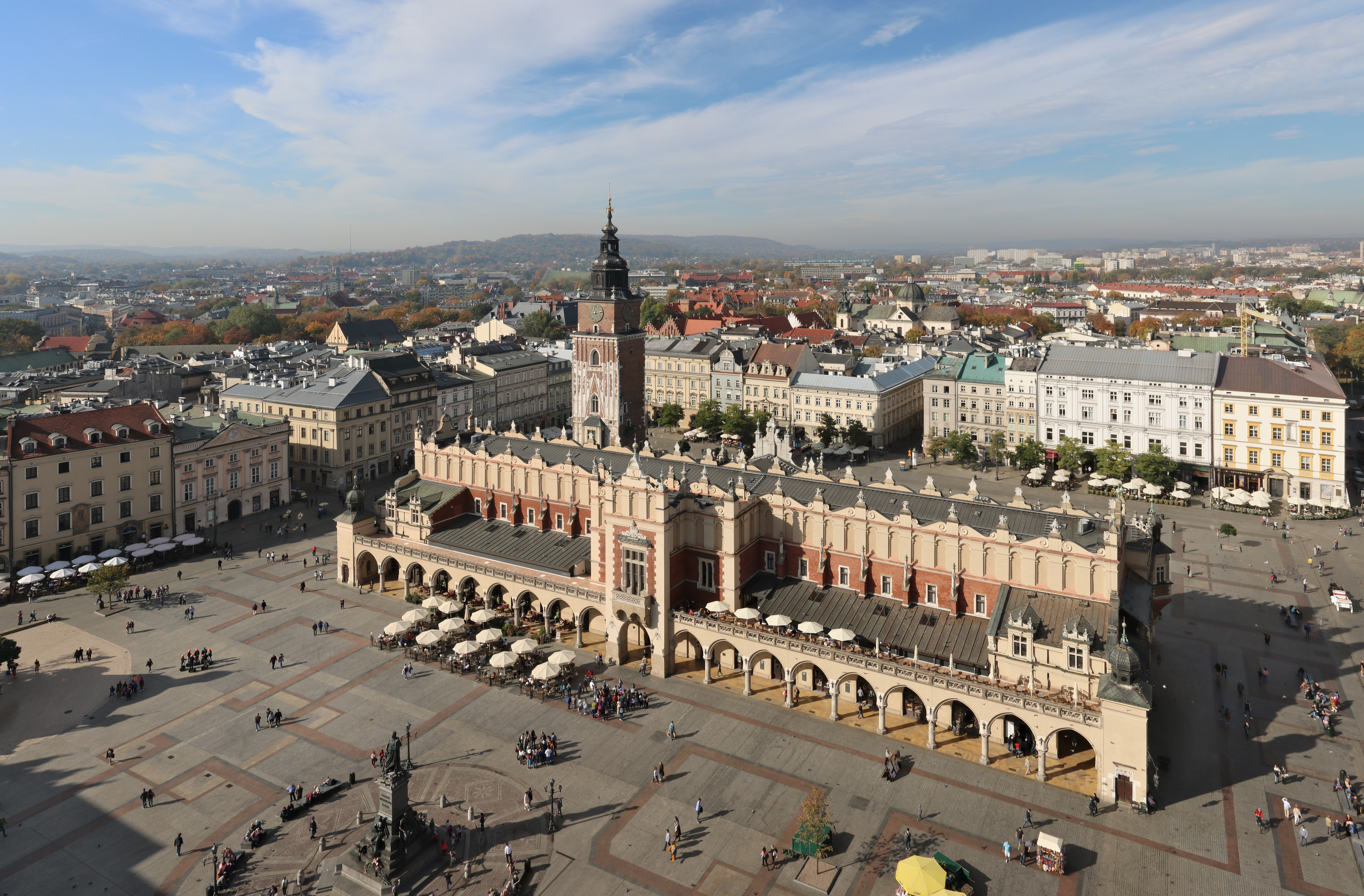
Kraków is the capital of Lesser Poland

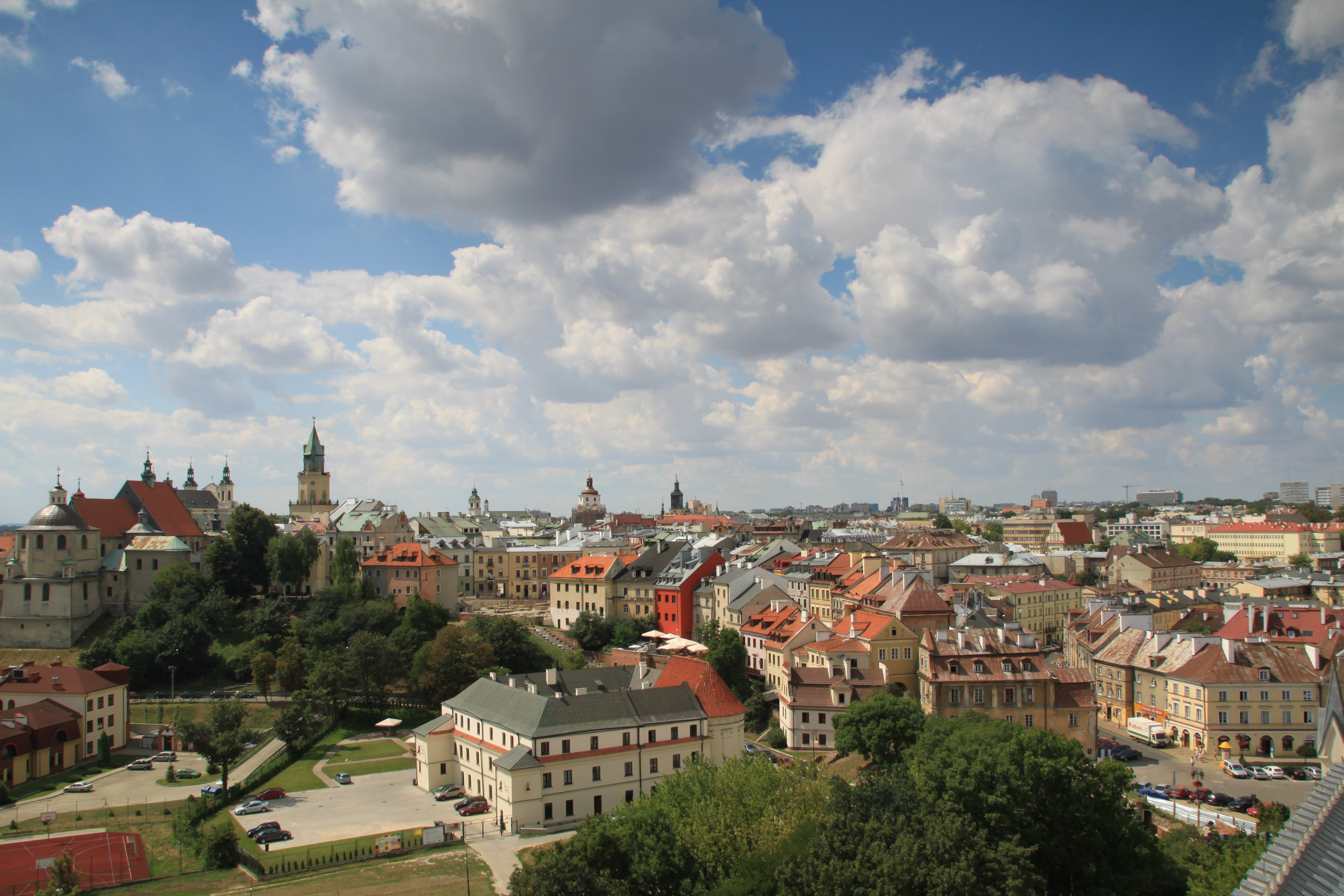
Lublin, the second-largest city of Lesser Poland

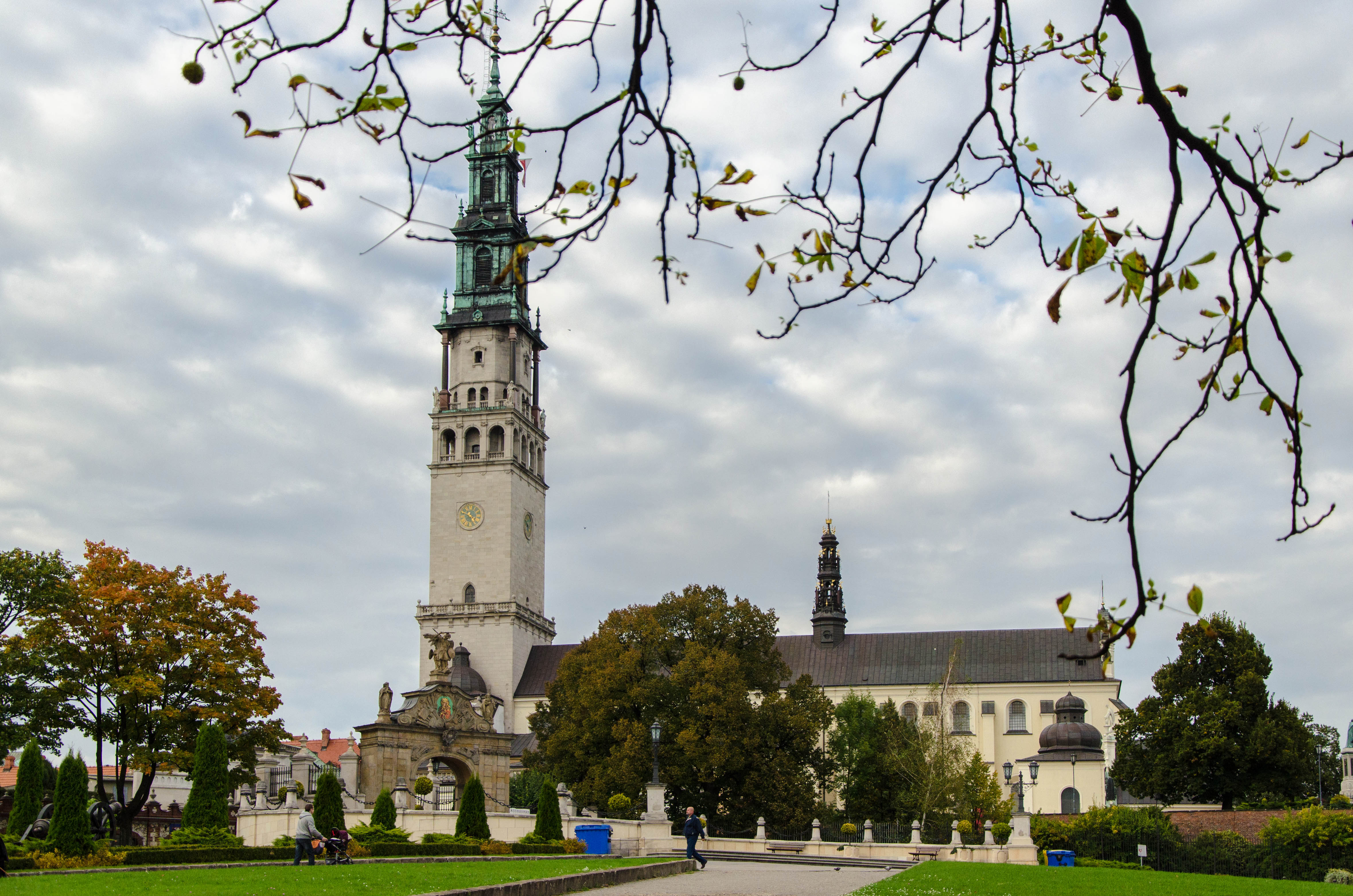
Częstochowa, the third-largest city of Lesser Poland

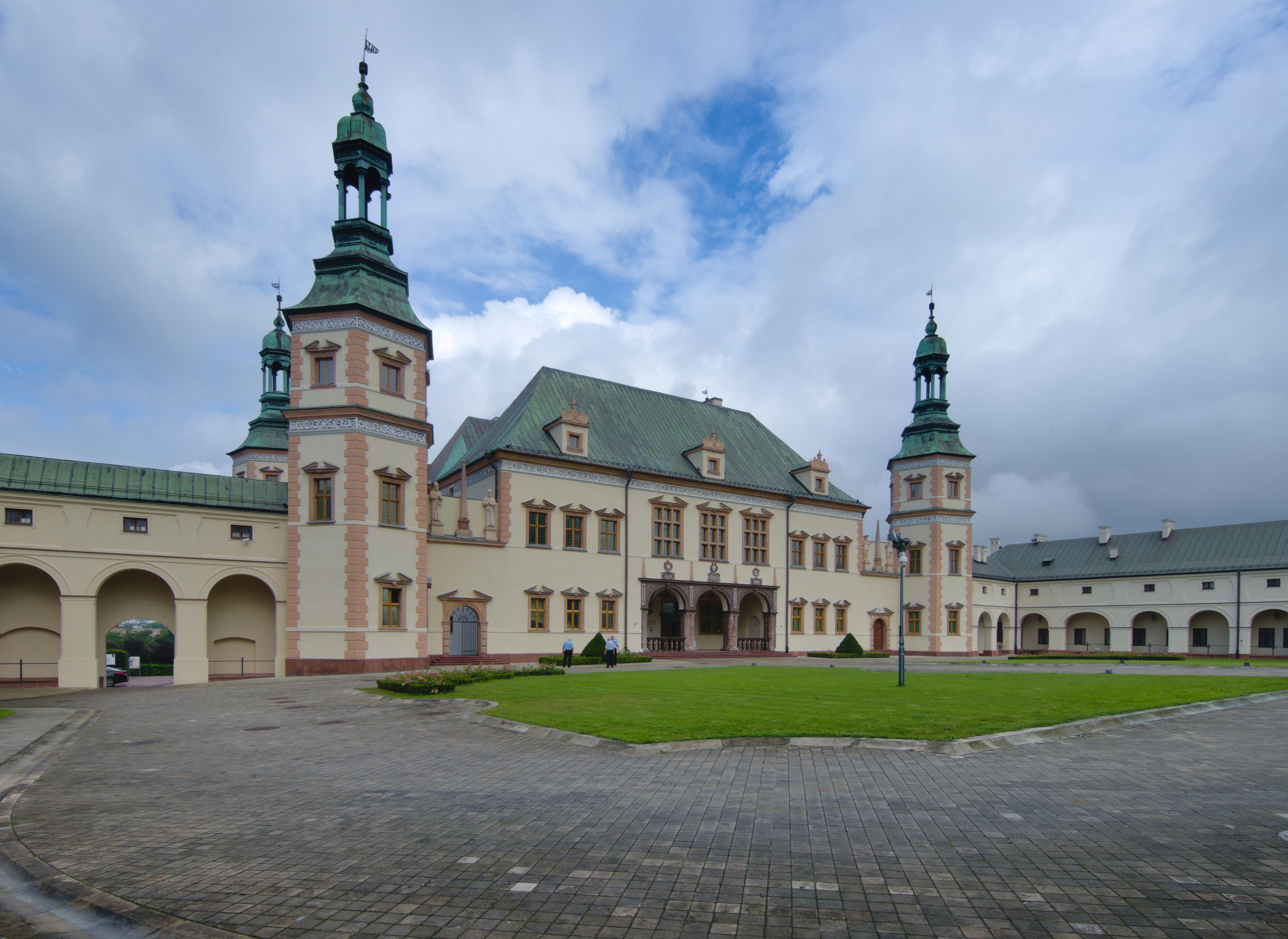
Kielce, the sixth-largest city of Lesser Poland

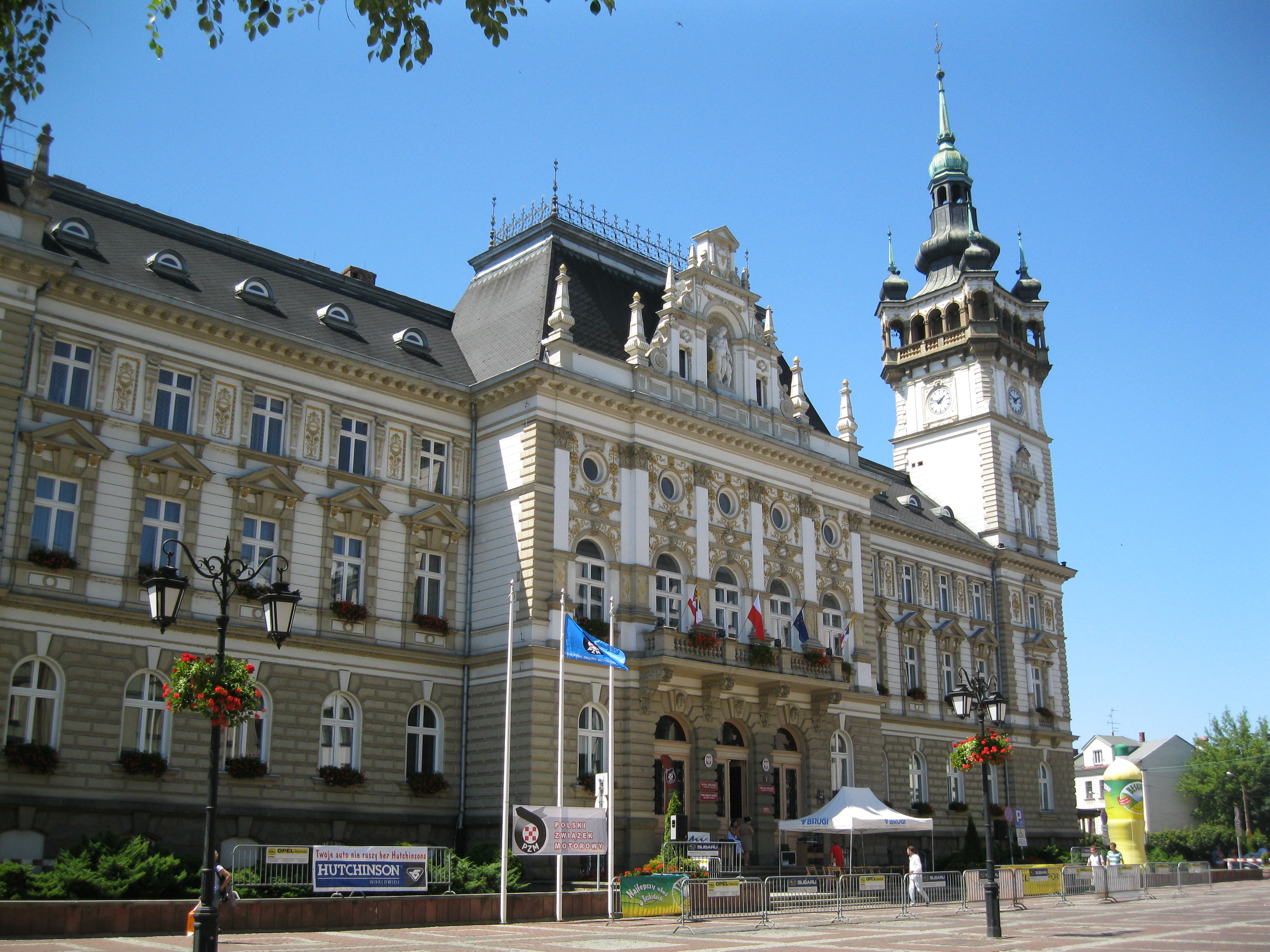
City hall of Bielsko-Biała, the seventh-largest city of Lesser Poland

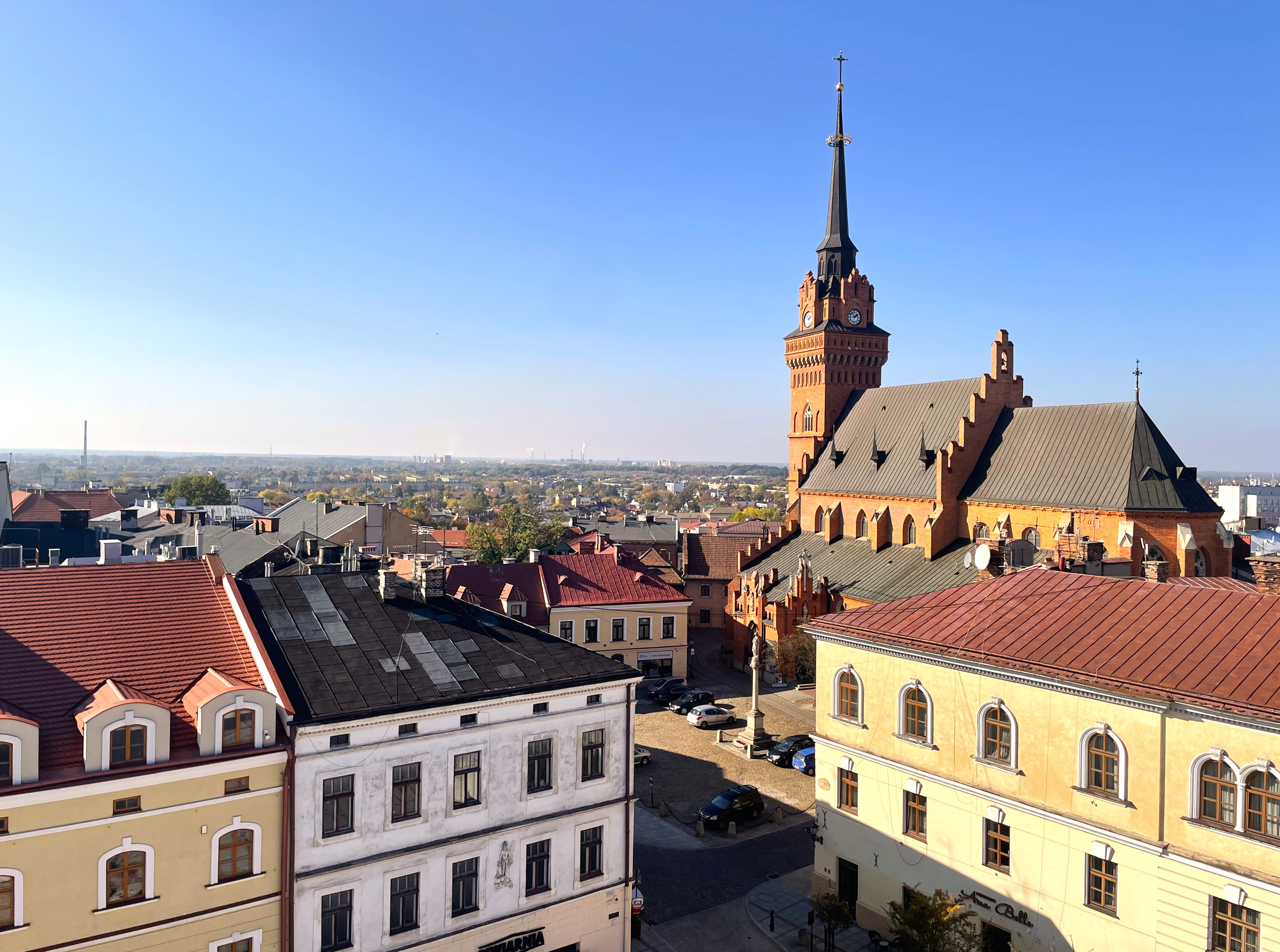
Tarnów, the ninth-largest city of Lesser Poland

In 1998, the government of Poland carried out administrative reform of the country. For the first time in history, Lesser Poland Voivodeship was created, with its capital in Kraków, and an area of 15,108 square kilometers. The new province covers only a small, southwestern part of historical Lesser Poland.

Today, Lesser Poland is divided between several voivodeships: whole Lesser Poland Voivodeship, whole Świętokrzyskie Voivodeship, western half of Lublin Voivodeship, western part of Subcarpathian Voivodeship, eastern half of Silesian Voivodeship, southern part of Mazovian Voivodeship and southeastern corner of Łódź Voivodeship (around Opoczno).

There were suggestions that Lesser Poland Voivodeship should stretch from Bielsko-Biała to Ostrowiec Świętokrzyski and Sandomierz. Furthermore, creation of an Old Poland Voivodeship was proposed, on the historical lands of northern Lesser Poland. Also, since about half of territory of current Silesian Voivodeship belongs to historical Lesser Poland, there are suggestions to rename it into Silesian – Lesser Poland Voivodeship.

== Major cities and towns (by size) ==
L.p.	City	Population (2023)	Area (km^{2}.)	Current voivodeship
1.	Kraków	803,282	326,80	Lesser Poland Voivodeship
2.	Lublin	331,243	147,45	Lublin Voivodeship
3.	Częstochowa	208,282	159,71	Silesian Voivodeship
4.	Radom	197,848	111,80	Masovian Voivodeship
5.	Sosnowiec	189,178	91,06	Silesian Voivodeship
6.	Kielce	183,885	109,65	Świętokrzyskie Voivodeship
7.	Bielsko-Biała*	166,765	124,51	Silesian Voivodeship
8.	Dąbrowa Górnicza	114,765	188,73	Silesian Voivodeship
9.	Tarnów	103,960	72,38	Lesser Poland Voivodeship
10.	Jaworzno	87,552	152,67	Silesian Voivodeship
11.	Nowy Sącz	80,587	57,58	Lesser Poland Voivodeship
12.	Siedlce**	75,623	32,00	Masovian Voivodeship
13.	Ostrowiec Świętokrzyski	62,980	46,43	Świętokrzyskie Voivodeship
14.	Mielec	57,363	46,89	Subcarpathian Voivodeship
15.	Stalowa Wola	55,846	82,52	Subcarpathian Voivodeship
16.	Będzin	54,322	37,37	Silesian Voivodeship
17.	Zawiercie	46,727	85,25	Silesian Voivodeship
18.	Starachowice	44,992	31,82	Świętokrzyskie Voivodeship
19.	Puławy	44,397	50,49	Lublin Voivodeship
20.	Tarnobrzeg	44,156	85,39	Subcarpathian Voivodeship
21.	Dębica	43,301	34,02	Subcarpathian Voivodeship
22.	Skarżysko-Kamienna	41,793	64,39	Świętokrzyskie Voivodeship
23.	Świdnik	36,992	20	Lublin Voivodeship
24.	Oświęcim	36,048	30	Lesser Poland Voivodeship
25.	Chrzanów	34,387	38	Lesser Poland Voivodeship
26.	Nowy Targ	33,103	26	Lesser Poland Voivodeship
27.	Jasło	33,100	37	Subcarpathian Voivodeship
28.	Olkusz	32,670	26	Lesser Poland Voivodeship
29.	Żywiec	29,878	50	Silesian Voivodeship
30.	Bochnia	28,692	30	Lesser Poland Voivodeship

* Only part in Lesser Poland; ** Historically part of Lesser Poland, since the creation of the Podlaskie Voivodeship in 1816 the area is often referred to as Southern Podlachia.

In the Kingdom of Poland and Polish–Lithuanian Commonwealth, several other locations used to be important urban centers of Lesser Poland, but in the course of the time, their significance declined. The main example is Sandomierz, which for hundreds of years was one of the most important cities of Poland, but now is a town of 25,000. Other examples of historically important places, which are now little towns or villages are:

- Biecz, a town of 5,000, once the seat of a county, incorporated in 1257,
- Chęciny, a village now, once the seat of a county, with a royal castle,
- Czchów, a town of 2,000, incorporated before 1333, once the seat of a county,
- Goraj, a village now, which used to be one of urban centers of Lublin Voivodeship,
- Iłża, a town of 5,000, incorporated before 1294, with a royal castle,
- Kazimierz Dolny, which enjoyed its greatest prosperity in the 16th and the first half of the 17th century,
- Koprzywnica, a village now, a town in 1268–1869,
- Książ Wielki, a town in 1385–1875, once the seat of a county,
- Lelów, a village now, which used to be the seat of a county. Incorporated in 1314, with a royal castle,
- Nowe Miasto Korczyn, a town in 1258–1869, with a royal castle, where general sejmiks of Lesser Poland took place,
- Opatów, a town of 7,000, incorporated in 1282, once the seat of sejmiks,
- Parczew, now a town of 10,000, once a major urban center of northeast Lesser Poland,
- Pilzno, now a town of 4,000, once the seat of a county,
- Sieciechów, a village now, once an important town, incorporated in 1232,
- Stężyca, a village now. Once the seat of a county, which used to be a town in 1330–1869,
- Szczyrzyc, a village now, which used to be the seat of a county,
- Szydłowiec, a town of 12,000, with a royal castle, which in the Renaissance period was an important urban center of northern Lesser Poland,
- Szydłów, a village now, which used to be a major urban center of Sandomierz Voivodeship,
- Urzędów, a village now, which in 1405–1869 used to be a town and the seat of a county,
- Wiślica, a village now, which was probably the capital of the Vistulans, and the seat of a county,
- Wojnicz, now a town of 3,500, incorporated in 1278, used to be the seat of a county,
- Zawichost, a town of 2,000, once a royal town with a castle, incorporated before 1255.
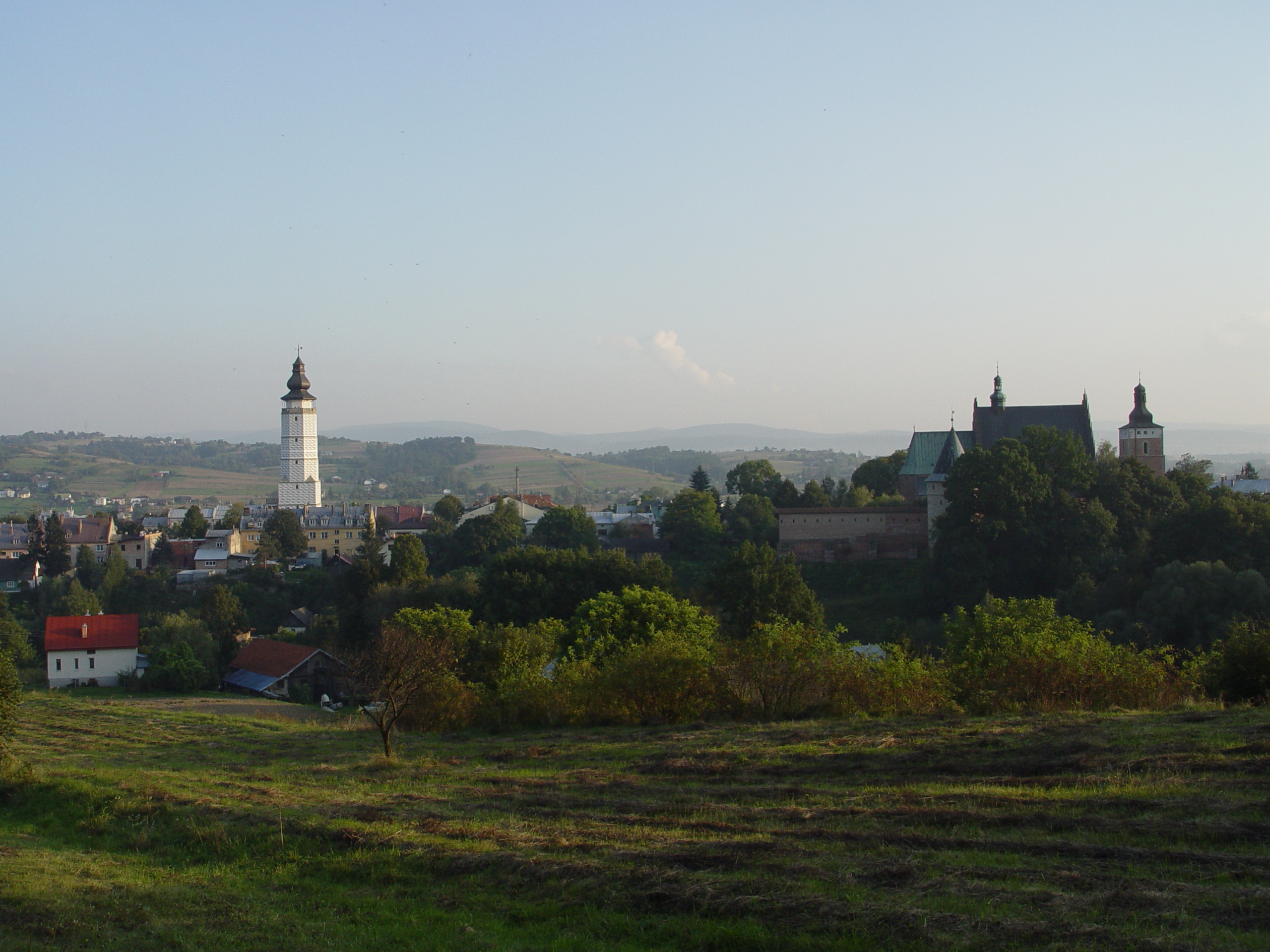
Biecz

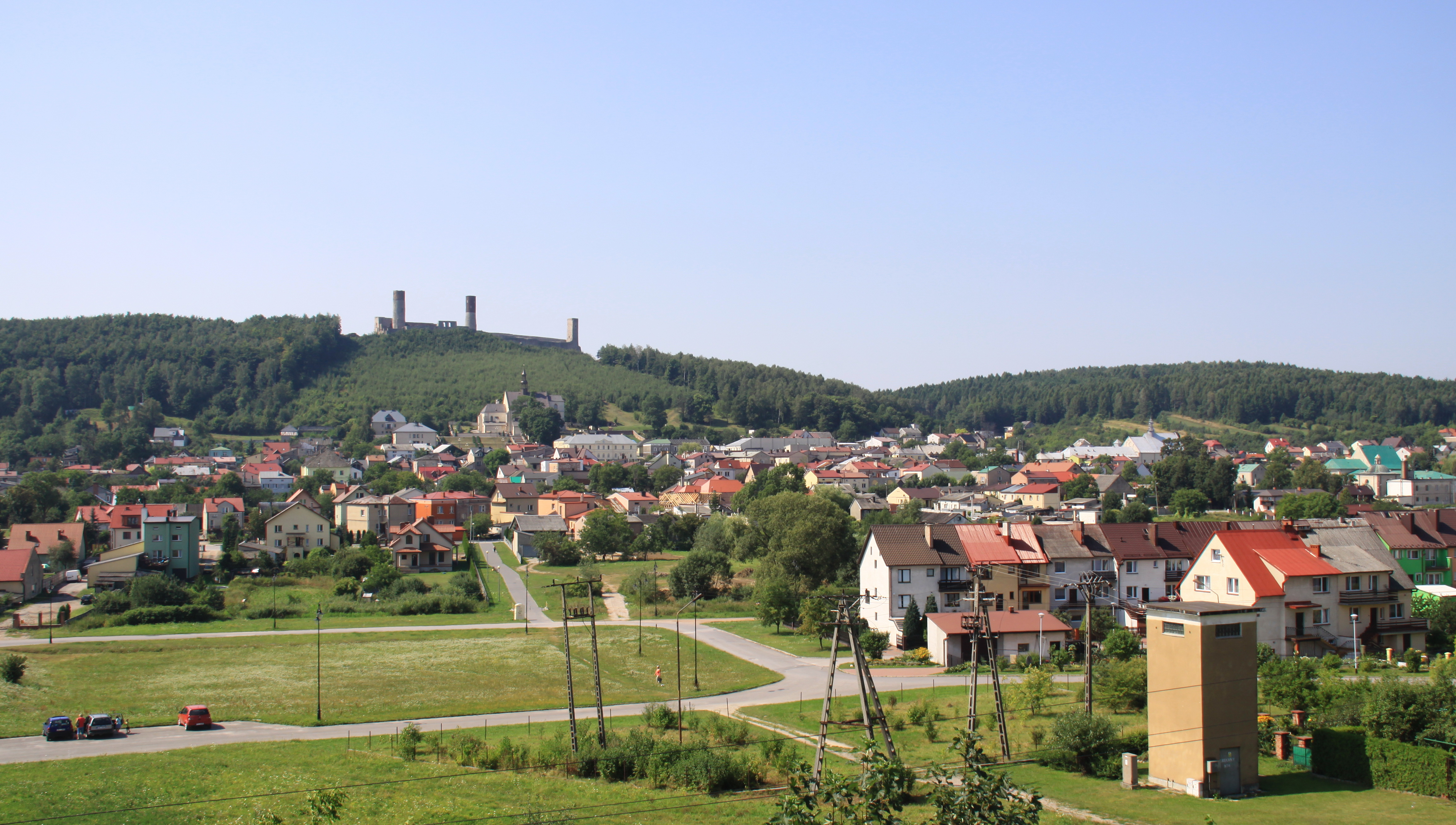
Chęciny

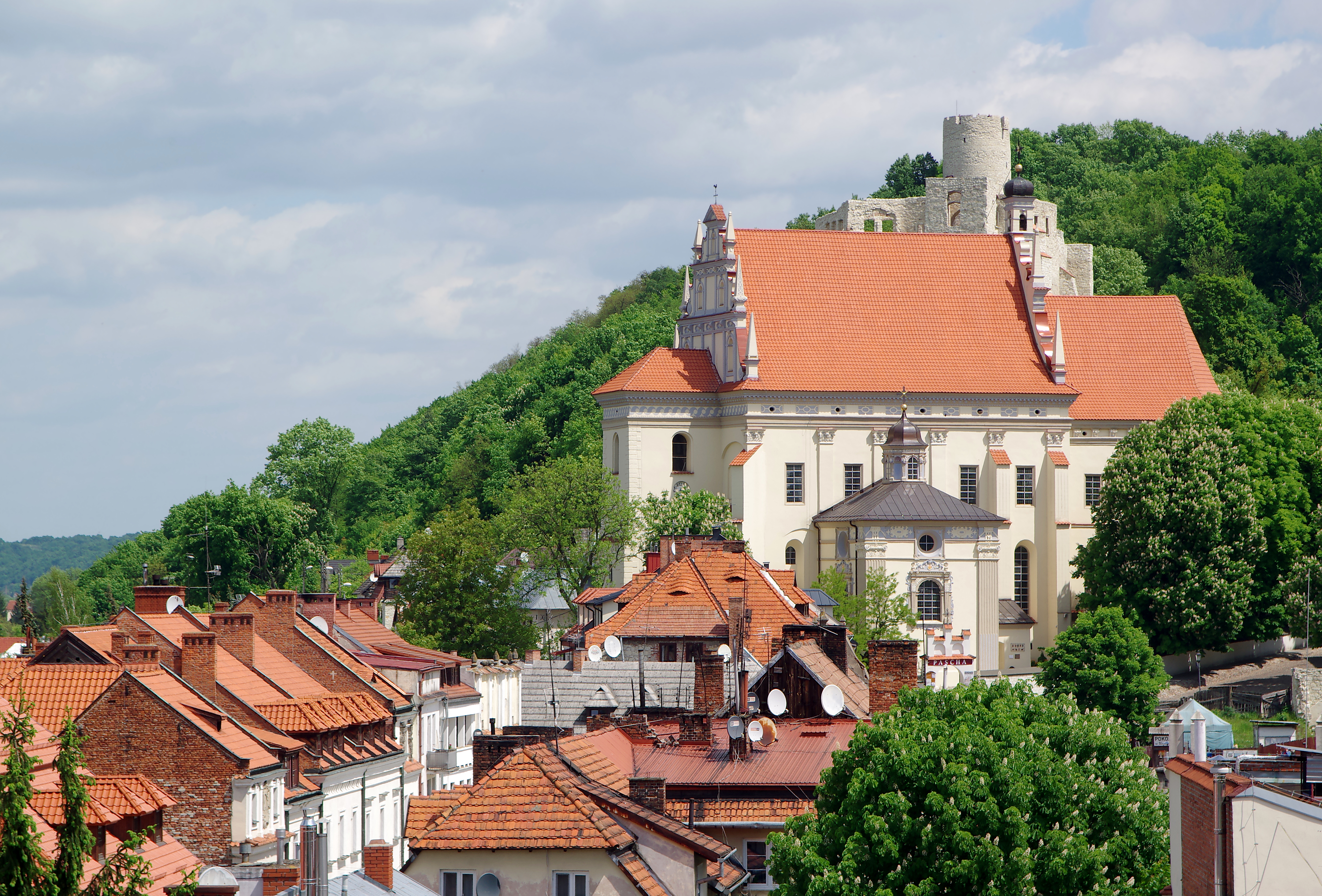
Kazimierz Dolny

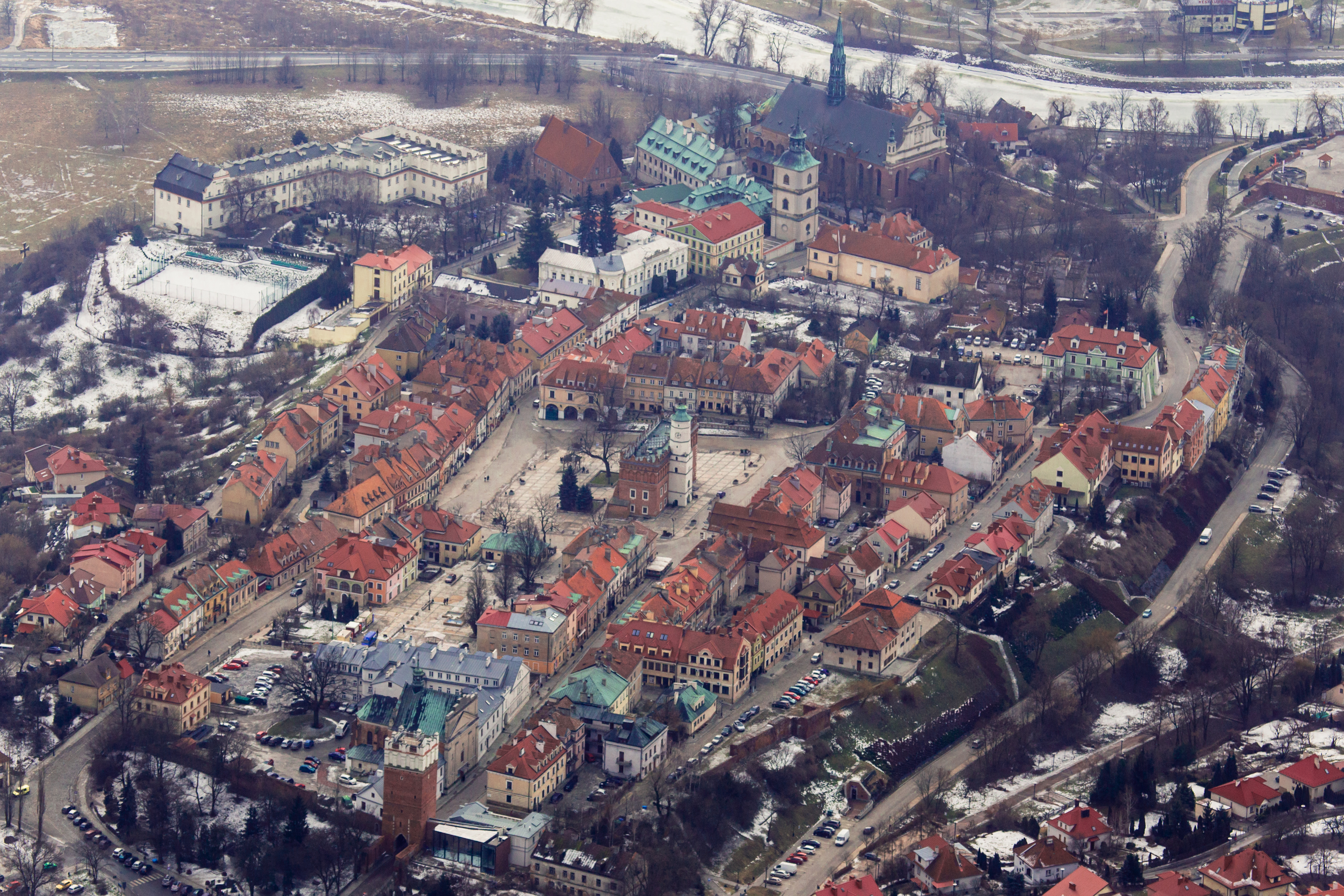
Sandomierz

== Economy and industry ==
History of industry in Lesser Poland goes back to prehistoric times, when in Świętokrzyskie Mountains, first bloomeries were constructed. In the Middle Ages, first plants were opened in that area, and as a result, Old-Polish Industrial Region was created, which was a major industrial region of the Polish–Lithuanian Commonwealth. In the 17th century, first Polish blast furnaces were constructed in Samsonów by Italian engineer Hieronim Caccio. Apart from iron products, used for military purposes, Old-Polish Industrial Region also manufactured charcoal and glass. In 1782, in Poland there were 34 bloomeries, out of which 27 were located in Old-Polish Industrial Region. Another major industrial area of Lesser Poland is Zagłębie Dąbrowskie, where in the 16th century, lead, silver, and zinc were found. As early as in the 15th century, coal was extracted in Trzebinia – Siersza, and in the following centuries, especially in the 19th century, several coal mines and steel mills were opened in Zagłębie and in Zagłębie Krakowskie (first coal mine in Jaworzno was opened in 1792). In nearby Olkusz, the history of zinc mining dates to the 12th century when Casimir II the Just set up a mining settlement. Also, in the towns of Wieliczka and Bochnia, salt mines were established in the 12th and 13th centuries (see Bochnia Salt Mine, Wieliczka Salt Mine).

In the 20th century, natural resources were also discovered in central and eastern counties Lesser Poland. In 1964, the world's largest open-pit sulfur mine was opened in Machów near Tarnobrzeg. Other sulfur deposits in the area of Tarnobrzeg are Jeziorko, Grzybów-Gacki, and Grębów-Wydza. The mine at Machów is now closed. In the late 1960s, Eastern Lesser Poland became one of three coal basins of the country, when Lublin Basin was created. Major coal mine in the area is KWK Bogdanka near Łęczna, which is the only coal mine in Poland which has continuously generated a profit. Other Polish coal mines located in Lesser Poland are those found in western part of the province, along the boundary with Upper Silesia – KWK Janina in Jaworzno, KWK Sobieski, and also in Jaworzno. Copper and silver are extracted in Myszków (see Myszków mine).

In the late 1930s, the government of the Second Polish Republic created Central Industrial Region, which was almost exclusively located in Lesser Poland. Currently, within borders of the province, there are following industrial regions:

- Bielsko Industrial Region (Bielski Okręg Przemysłowy), which includes both towns from Lesser Poland, and Upper Silesia (Andrychów, Bielsko-Biała, Cieszyn, Kęty, Pszczyna, Skoczów, Żywiec),
- Częstochowa Industrial Region (Częstochowski Okręg Przemysłowy), which includes Częstochowa, Myszków, and Zawiercie.
- Upper Silesian Industrial Region (Górnośląski Okręg Przemysłowy). Despite the name, it also includes cities from Lesser Poland's Zagłębie Dąbrowskie – Sosnowiec, Będzin, Czeladź, Dąbrowa Górnicza, Wojkowice,
- Jaworzno – Chrzanów Industrial Region (Jaworznicko-Chrzanowski Okręg Przemysłowy), with the towns of Jaworzno, Chrzanów, Trzebinia, Libiąż, Chełmek, Bukowno, Alwernia, Krzeszowice,
- Carpathian Industrial Region (Karpacki Okręg Przemysłowy), which stretches from Nowy Sącz, through Jasło and Gorlice, to Sanok,
- Kraków Industrial Region (Krakowski Okręg Przemysłowy) – the city of Kraków and the towns of Wieliczka, Skawina, Myślenice, Bochnia,
- Lublin Industrial Region (Lubelski Okręg Przemysłowy) – the city of Lublin and the towns of Świdnik, Puławy, Łęczna,
- Tarnobrzeg Industrial Area (Tarnobrzeski Okręg Przemysłowy) – Stalowa Wola, Tarnobrzeg, Nisko, Staszów, Janów Lubelski, Gorzyce, Połaniec, Mielec,
- Tarnów – Rzeszów Industrial Region (Tarnowsko-Rzeszowski Okręg Przemysłowy), which stretches from Tarnów to Rzeszów, with such towns, as Dębica, Niedomice, Sędziszów Małopolski, Ropczyce.

In 2009, Polityka weekly made its own list of 500 biggest Polish companies. According to the list, second biggest company of the country was Polska Grupa Energetyczna, which, as Polityka stated, is headquartered in Lublin. Third biggest company of Poland in 2009 was Fiat Auto Poland from Bielsko-Biała. Other Lesser Polish companies which ranked high were: BP Poland from Kraków (ranked 12th), Emperia Holding from Lublin (ranked 26th), Kolporter Holding from Kielce (ranked 43rd), and Żywiec Brewery (ranked 44th). Other major companies of Lesser Poland are Azoty Tarnów, Bank BPH, Bogdanka Coal Mine, Carlsberg Polska, Comarch, Dębica SA, Huta Częstochowa, Huta Katowice, Fablok, FŁT-Kraśnik, Huta Stalowa Wola, Instal-Lublin, Janina Coal Mine, Jaworzno Power Station, Kozienice Power Station, Łucznik Arms Factory, Nowiny Cement Plant near Kielce, Połaniec Power Station, PZL Mielec, PZL-Świdnik, Sobieski Coal Mine, Tadeusz Sendzimir Steelworks.

Since the lands of historical Lesser Poland belong now to different voivodeships, unemployment rate differs from one region to another. In January 2010, in Poland the unemployment rate was 12,7%. In Silesian Voivodeship, eastern half of which is Lesser Poland, it was 9,9%, in Lesser Poland Voivodeship – 10,5%, in Subcarpathian Voivodeship – 16,3%, in Holy Cross Voivodeship – 15,5%, in Lublin Voivodeship – 13,6%, and in Mazovian Voivodeship (southern part of which is Lesser Poland) – 9,6%. In Lesser Poland's cities, the best situation was in Kraków (as for November 2009), where 4,1% had no job. In Bielsko-Biała, the rate was 5,7%, in Lublin – 8,8%, in Siedlce – 9,1%, in Tarnów – 9,2%, in Nowy Sącz – 10%, in Kielce and Częstochowa – 10,1%, in Jaworzno – 10,2%, in Dąbrowa Górnicza – 10,3%, in Sosnowiec – 12,2%, and in Tarnobrzeg – 14,3%. The worst situation on the job market (as for November 2009) was in Radom, where unemployment rate was 20,9% (it made Radom second worst city county of the nation, only after Grudziądz).

== Transport ==
=== Roads ===
Several European roads (see International E-road network) cross Lesser Poland. The most important one is the European route E40, which goes from west to east, across whole Europe. In Lesser Poland, the E40 goes from Jaworzno, via Kraków and Tarnów, towards eastern border of the country. Another main European road in Lesser Poland is the E77, which goes from north to south, via Radom, Kielce and Kraków, to southern border of Poland at Chyżne. Third major European road in Lesser Poland is the E30, which crosses the territory of the province in its extreme northeast corner, in Siedlce. Apart from these roads, Lesser Poland is crossed by the following European routes:

- E371, which begins in Radom, and goes via Ostrowiec Świętokrzyski, Tarnobrzeg, and Rzeszów to the border crossing at Barwinek,
- E372, which begins in Warsaw, and via north Eastern Lesser Poland (Lublin, Świdnik), goes to Polish–Ukrainian border at Hrebenne,
- E462, which goes through southwestern corner of the province, from Czech–Polish border and Bielsko-Biała, to John Paul II International Airport Kraków-Balice,
- E75, which crosses western counties of Lesser Poland – from Częstochowa, through Dąbrowa Górnicza and Jaworzno, to Bielsko-Biała and Czech–Polish border.

=== Airports ===
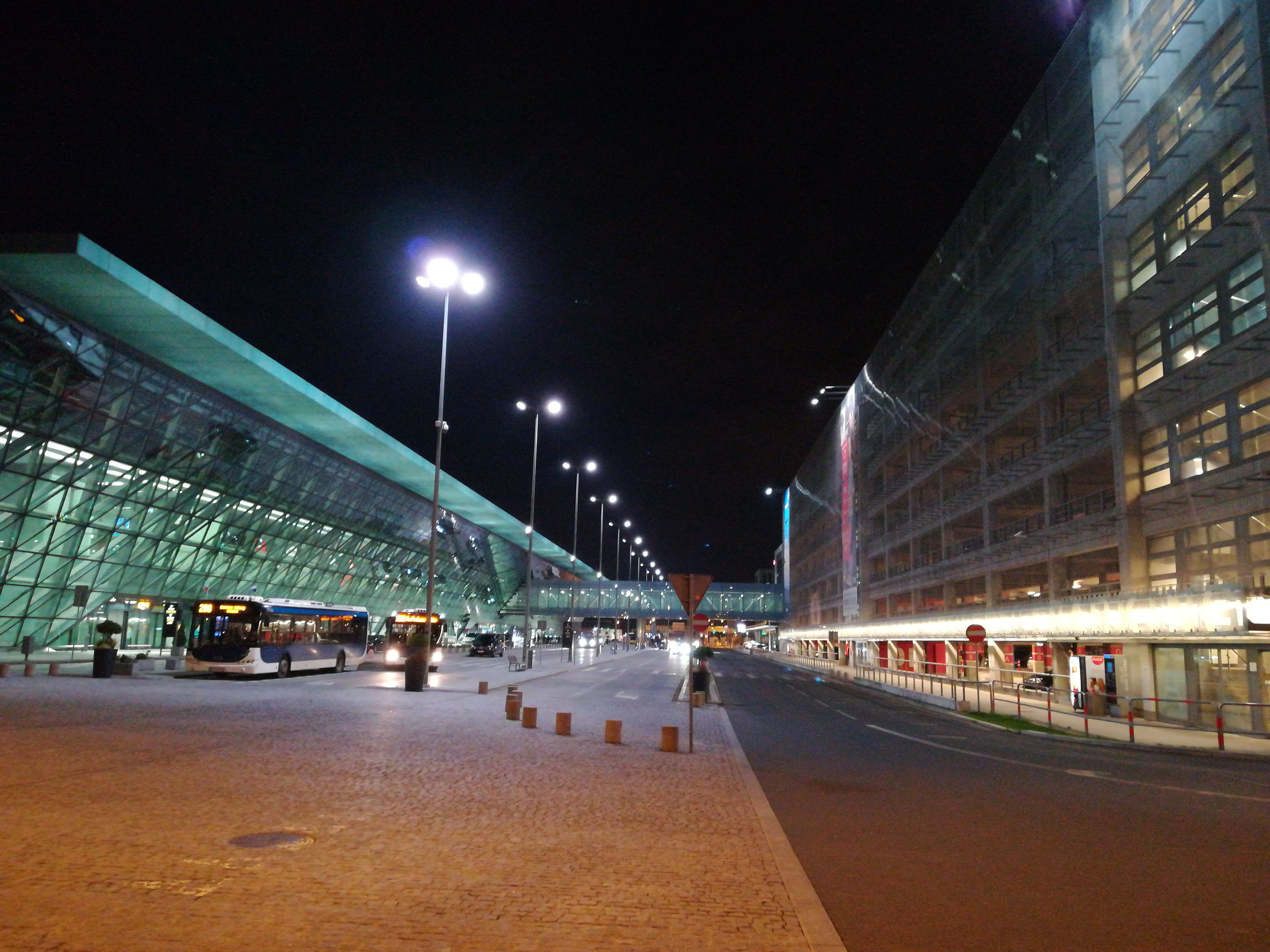
Kraków John Paul II International Airport, the busiest airport in Lesser Poland

Within borders of historical Lesser Poland, there are four airports – John Paul II International Airport Kraków–Balice, Lublin Airport, Warsaw Radom Airport and Katowice International Airport, which is located in the village of Pyrzowice, on the border between Lesser Poland and Upper Silesia. Pyrzowice is part of Gmina Ożarowice, which after Partitions of Poland, and Congress of Vienna belonged to Będzin County of the Russian Empire. In the interbellum, the area of future airport belonged to Lesser Poland's Kielce Voivodeship, and in 1945, was transferred to Katowice Voivodeship (initially Silesian-Dąbrowa Voivodeship). In 1998, Ożarowice, together with the airport, was attached to Tarnowskie Góry County, despite the fact that it is not located in Upper Silesia

Further airports in Lesser Poland will be opened in the future – Kielce – Obice. Also, Rzeszów-Jasionka Airport is located on eastern border of the province.

=== Railroads ===
Railroad network of Lesser Poland is very unevenly distributed. It is very dense in the west, along the border with Upper Silesia, and sparse in the east, especially along the Vistula, and around Lublin. All major cities of the province are connected with each other, however traveling from Kraków to Lublin is time-consuming, as trains have to take an extended route, via Kielce, Radom, and Dęblin. Also, there is no direct connection between Tarnów and Kielce, as these cities belonged to different countries before 1918. Underdevelopment of the railroads in northern and Eastern Lesser Poland is the result of the policy of the Russian Empire. For military reasons, the Russians were not interested in construction of a dense network of lines along the border with Germany and Austria-Hungary, allowing only the construction of narrow-gauge connections. Along the Vistula, between Kraków and Dęblin (the distance of some 320 kilometers), there are only four rail bridges – in Dęblin (rebuilt after the war, in 1947), in Sandomierz (built in 1928), in Tarnobrzeg-Nagnajów (built in 1961, together with a road bridge), and in Zaduszniki (built in 1979 for the Broad Gauge Metallurgy Line). In Kraków itself, there are three rail bridges over the Vistula.

Among rail hubs of Lesser Poland, there are Bielsko-Biała, Chabówka, Częstochowa, Dąbrowa Górnicza, Dębica, Dęblin, Jaworzno-Szczakowa, Kalwaria Zebrzydowska Lanckorona, Kielce, Koniecpol, Kozłów, Kraków, Lublin, Łuków, Muszyna, Nowy Sącz, Oświęcim, Siedlce, Spytkowice, Skarżysko-Kamienna, Stalowa Wola, Stróże, Sucha Beskidzka, Radom, Tarnów, Trzebinia, Tunel, Zawiercie, and Żywiec.

In the late 1970s, the Communist government built the broad-gauge Broad Gauge Metallurgy Line, which crosses Lesser Poland from west to east along the Vistula.

== Tourism and nature ==
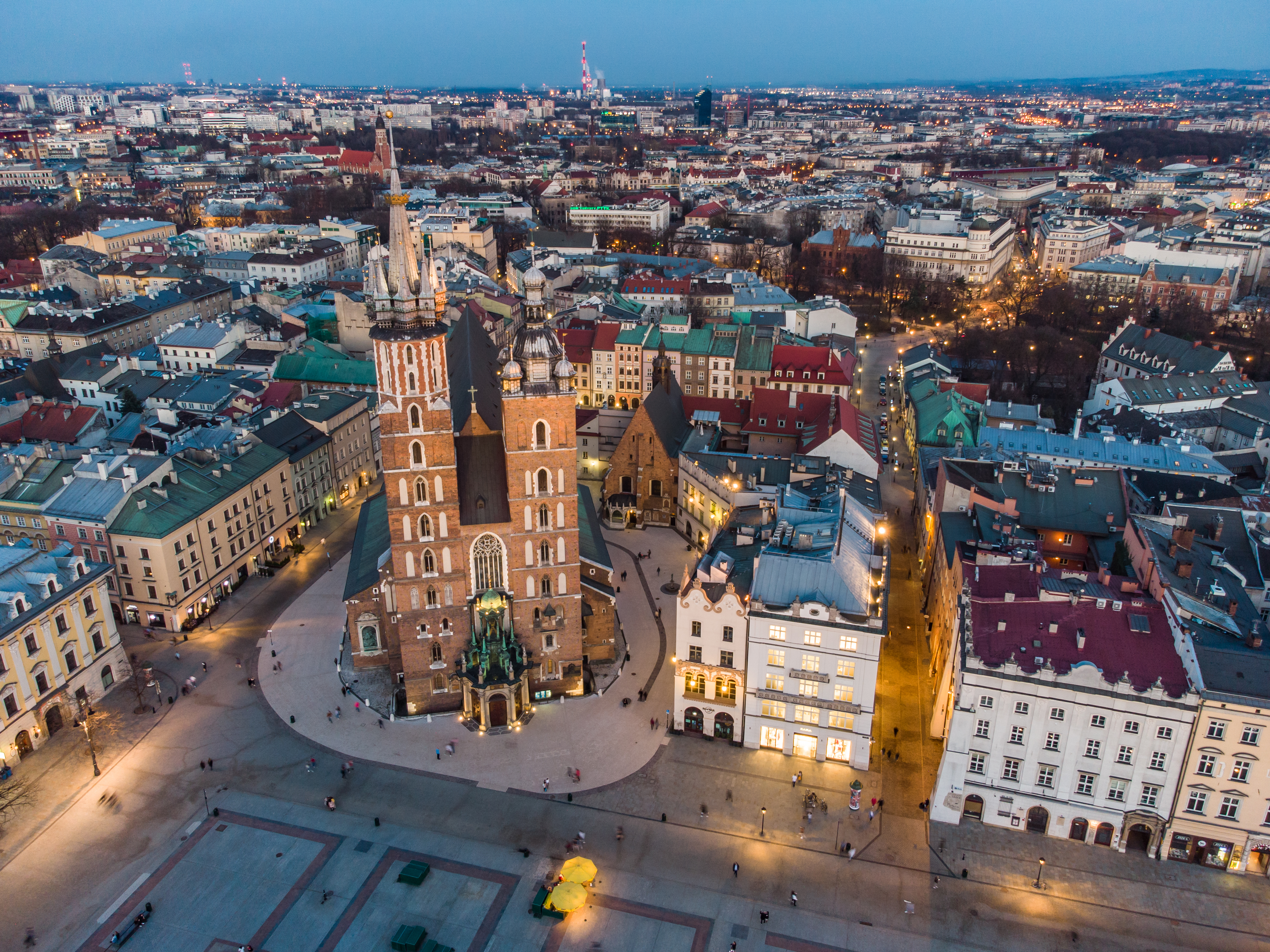
Kraków Old Town, UNESCO World Heritage Site

The historical capital of Lesser Poland – Kraków – is regarded as the cultural capital of Poland, while Zakopane is considered the winter capital of Poland. In 1978, UNESCO placed Kraków's Old Town on the list of World Heritage Sites. From Sandomierz to Kraków goes the re-established Lesser Polish Way, one of the routes of the medieval Way of St. James. Every year, hundreds of thousands of tourists come to Lesser Poland, to see its historic cities – Sandomierz, Kazimierz Dolny, Zakopane, Biecz, Opatów, Szydłów, Lublin, and Kraków. Famous Jasna Góra Monastery in Częstochowa, spiritual capital of the country, attracts hundreds of thousands of pilgrims, as well as Auschwitz concentration camp (also placed on the UNESCO World Heritage Sites List). Lesser Poland has many museums, the city of Kraków itself has about sixty of them. Among the most famous are The Czartoryski Museum, The Galicia Jewish Museum, The National Museum, Kraków, Polish Aviation Museum, Sukiennice Museum, and Wawel Castle. There are museums in other locations of the province, such as Auschwitz-Birkenau State Museum, Bielsko-Biała Museum, Holy Father John Paul II Family Home in Wadowice, Jacek Malczewski Museum in Radom, Lublin Museum, Museum of Częstochowa, Museum of Sandomierz Diocese, Museum of Żywiec Brewery, Museum of Zagłębie in Będzin, Przypkowscy Clock Museum, Regional Museum in Wiślica, Regional Museum in Siedlce, Tytus Chałubiński Tatra Museum in Zakopane.

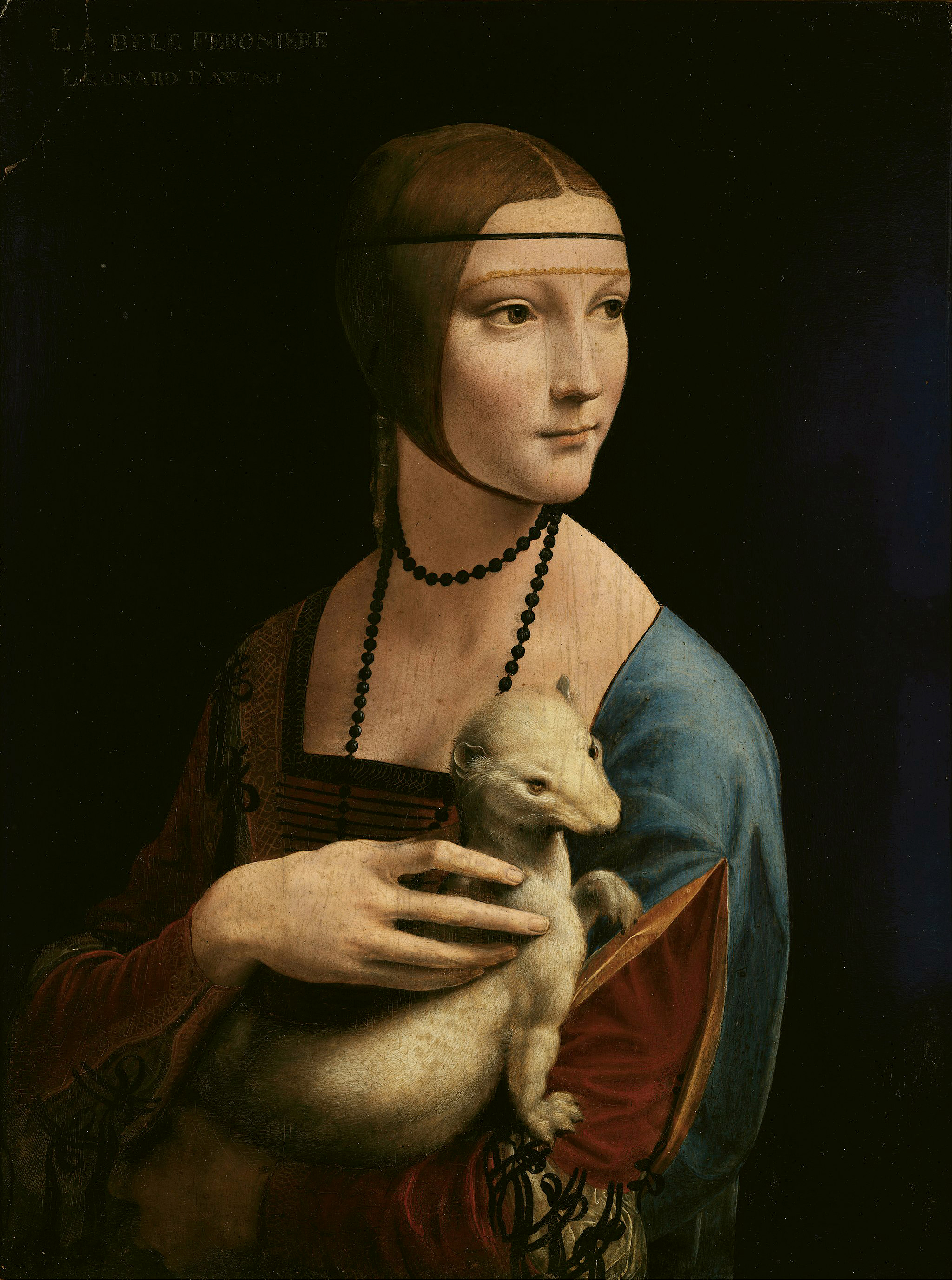
Lady with an Ermine by Leonardo da Vinci, Czartoryski Museum, Kraków

Among other major places of interest of the province are: Baranów Sandomierski Castle, Będzin Castle, Chęciny Castle, Czarnolas in Zwoleń, Dunajec river castles, Kalwaria Zebrzydowska park (UNESCO World Heritage Sites List), Krzyżtopór, Lipnica Murowana, Lublin Castle, Łysa Góra, Maczuga Herkulesa, Majdanek concentration camp, Niedzica Castle, Ogrodzieniec, Pieskowa Skała, Temple of the Sibyl, Trail of the Eagles' Nests, Wieliczka Salt Mine (UNESCO World Heritage Sites List), Wooden Churches of Southern Lesser Poland (UNESCO World Heritage Sites List). Furthermore, thousands of tourists come to Radom in northern Lesser Poland, to watch the popular, biannual Radom Air Show. Lesser Poland has a number of open-air museums – Góra Birów in Kraków-Częstochowa Upland, Museum of Kielce Village in Kielce, Museum of Lublin Village in Lublin, Museum of Folk Culture in Kolbuszowa, Museum of Radom Village in Radom, Vistula River Etnographic Park in Babice, Nowy Sącz Etnographic Park in Nowy Sącz, Orawa Etnographic Park in Zubrzyca Górna, Chabówka Rolling-Stock Heritage Park in Chabówka. The Małopolska Institute of Culture, located in Kraków, promotes the activities of regional museums and smaller sites of interest.

Lesser Poland is famous for its underground waters and spas, such as Busko-Zdrój, Solec-Zdrój, Nałęczów, Muszyna, Szczawnica, Piwniczna, Wysowa-Zdrój, Rabka, Swoszowice, Żegiestów, Krzeszowice, Wieliczka, and Krynica-Zdrój. Mountains and resorts of the province make it a major center of Polish tourism – Tatra National Park is visited by around 3 million tourists every year.

The following National Parks are located in Lesser Poland:

- Tatra National Park,
- Ojców National Park,
- Pieniny National Park (Poland),
- Babia Góra National Park,
- Gorce National Park,
- Magurski National Park,
- Roztocze National Park,
- Świętokrzyski National Park.
- Polesie National Park

== Education ==
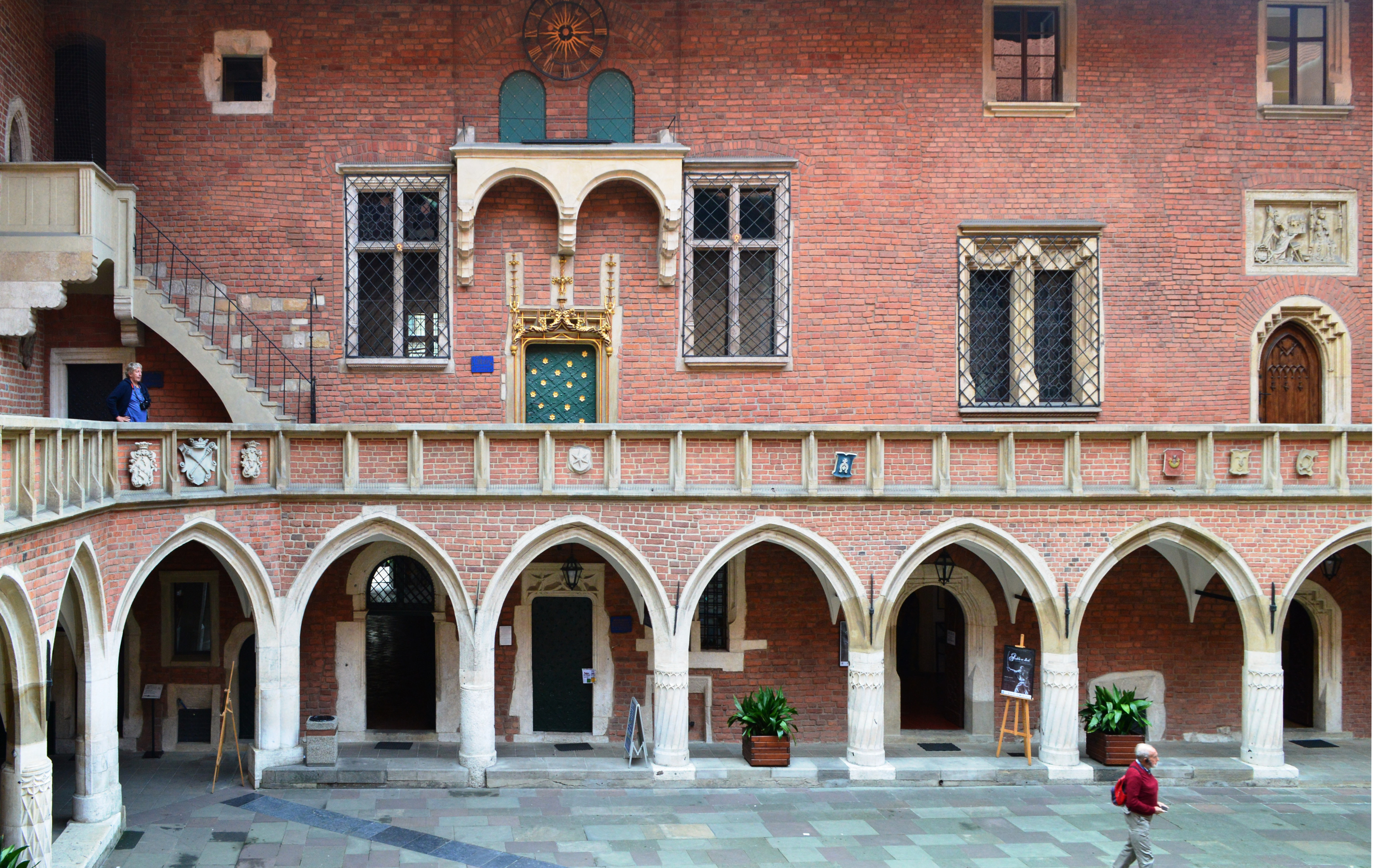
Collegium Maius, oldest building of the Jagiellonian University in Kraków, the oldest university in Poland and the 13th oldest university in continuous operation in the world

=== Universities ===
Lesser Poland is home to Poland's oldest university – Kraków's Jagiellonian University, which was established in 1364. For centuries, it was the only college of the province, and of the whole country. In December 1918, John Paul II Catholic University of Lublin was opened, becoming second university of Lesser Poland. In 1944, also in Lublin, Maria Curie-Skłodowska University was established.

=== Technical universities ===
There are several technical universities in Lesser Poland – Kraków's AGH University of Science and Technology, and Tadeusz Kościuszko Kraków University of Technology, as well as University of Bielsko-Biała, Częstochowa University of Technology, Lublin University of Technology, Kazimierz Pułaski Technical University of Radom, and Kielce University of Technology.

=== Other colleges ===
Future teachers may study at Pedagogical University of Kraków, or Jan Długosz University in Częstochowa, and future physicians at Jagiellonian University Medical College, and Medical University of Lublin. Other state colleges are Jan Kochanowski University in Kielce, Pontifical University of John Paul II in Kraków, Agricultural University of Kraków, University of Life Sciences in Lublin, and Kraków University of Economics. Unique in the country is the Polish Air Force Academy, located in Dęblin. Among private colleges of Lesser Poland, there is Wyższa Szkoła Biznesu – National-Louis University in Nowy Sącz.

== Regional identity and culture ==
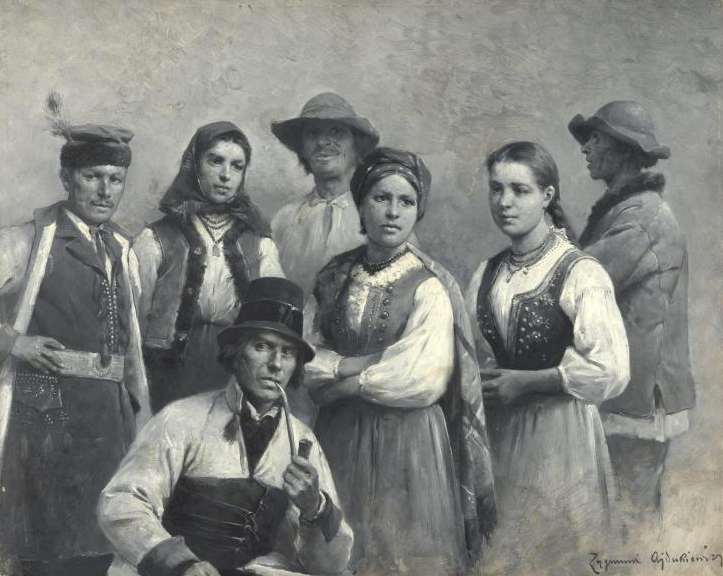
Krakow and Goral folk costumes in Lesser Poland, 1898

Since Lesser Poland ceased to exist as a unified region in the late 18th century, during the Partitions of Poland, most of its inhabitants are not aware of their heritage. Even the residents of Jaworzno, a city which for centuries belonged to Kraków Land and only in 1975 was transferred to Katowice Voivodeship (see Voivodeships of Poland (1975–98)), are not familiar with their Lesser Polish roots. In a poll in April 2011, 57% of Jaworzno's inhabitants stated that their city is historically tied with Lesser Poland, but as many as 36% said their city is tied with Upper Silesia. Polish linguist Jan Miodek emphasizes the fact that linguistically, Będzin is closer to Myślenice than to Tarnowskie Góry, only 20 km away. Miodek wrote that even though Upper Silesia and Lesser Poland's Zagłębie Dąbrowskie are industrially and administratively tied, both regions are culturally and linguistically different from each other. Residents of Zagłębie Dąbrowskie are known for their dislike of Upper Silesians, whom they call hanysy, while the Silesians call them gorole. In recent years, more inhabitants of Zagłębie become aware of their Lesser Poland's heritage. Also, after Partitions of Poland, when Austrian province of Galicia was created, the cities of Rzeszów and Przemyśl, which are part of historical Red Ruthenia/Cherven Cities, became associated with Lesser Poland. Therefore, currently the notion of Lesser Poland most commonly applies to the two voivodeships which in the past belonged to Austrian Empire – Lesser Poland Voivodeship, and Subcarpathian Voivodeship.

Among several Lesser Poland's regional organizations, one of the most important is Stowarzyszenie Gmin i Powiatów Małopolski (The Association of Villages and Counties of Lesser Poland). It publishes a magazine called Wspólnota Małopolska (Lesser Polish Community), and every year it chooses a Lesser Polish Person of the Year (among winners are John Paul II, Anna Dymna, and Stanisław Dziwisz). The Association of Villages and Counties of Lesser Poland has over 120 members from four Polish voivodeships. Among members are cities of Kraków, Częstochowa, Bielsko-Biała, Tarnów, and Przemyśl.

Arguably, the most famous product of Lesser Polish cuisine is the bagel, which was invented in Kraków. Other famous food specialties of the province are oscypek (EU Protected Geographical Status), slivovitz from the village of Łącko, bublik, papal cream cake from Wadowice, Lisiecka Sausage (EU Protected Geographical Status), and Bryndza Podhalańska. Among other popular products that are made in Lesser Poland, there are beers (Browary Lubelskie, Żywiec Beer, and Okocim Beer), pastas and snacks from Lublin's Lubella, Kielce Mayonnaise, coffee substitute beverage INKA from Skawina, chocolates from Kraków's Wawel Factory, juices from Tymbark, vodka Żołądkowa Gorzka produced in Lublin, and Chopin produced in Siedlce.

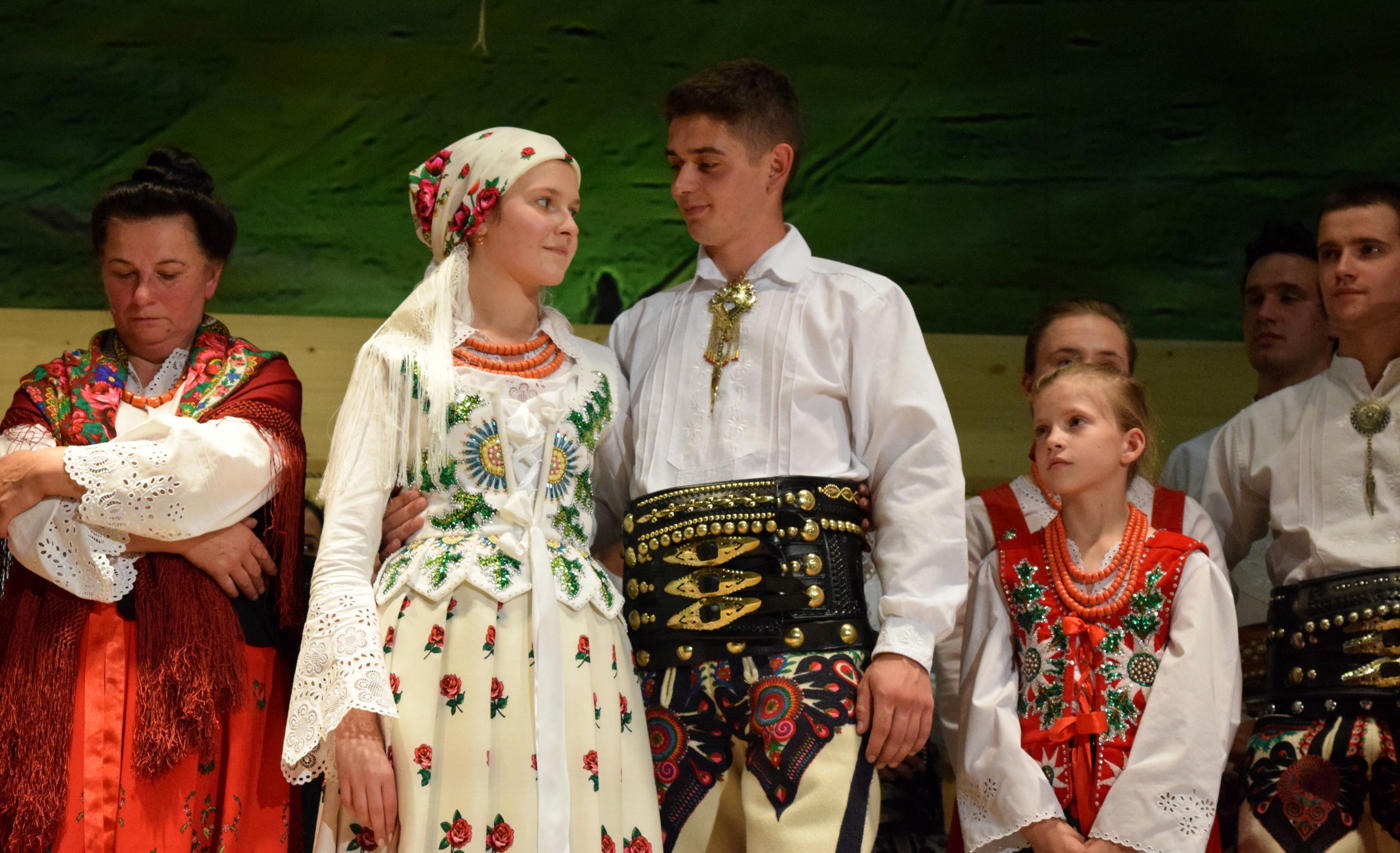
Folklore group in Podhale costume, Bukowina Tatrzańska, Lesser Poland, 2016

Folk costumes from Lesser Poland are widely known across the country – a dancing couple, dressed in traditional Kraków costume (Krakowiacy), is presented on the logo of renowned Żywiec beer, and Podhale is one of few Polish regions, where people regularly wear their traditional costumes. Both Kraków and Podhale folk costumes are among most popular garbs in Poland. Other folk costumes from the region are those of Zagłębie Dąbrowskie, Sandomierz, Rzeszów, Częstochowa, Kielce, Radom (regarded as the most traditional of all Polish costumes), Opoczno, Holy Cross Mountains, Nowy Sącz, and Lublin. There are several folk festivals in Lesser Poland, such as On the frontier of Lesser Poland and Mazovia (in Opoczno), Folk Festival of Józef Myszka (in Museum of Radom Village in Iłża), annual Days of Lesser Poland's Cultural Heritage, Week of the Beskidy Culture (in several locations), Wianki in Kraków, Festival of Old Music and Culture in Niepołomice, Festival of Folk Bands and Folk Singers in Kazimierz Dolny, International Folklore Meetings of Ignacy Wachowiak in Lublin, International Festival of Folklore of Mountain Lands in Zakopane, Jewish Culture Festival in Kraków. Krakowiak is one of Polish national dances, other popular Lesser Poland's folk dances are Zbójnicki from Podhale and dances from Lublin. Among Lesser Poland's customs are Lajkonik, and Kraków szopka.

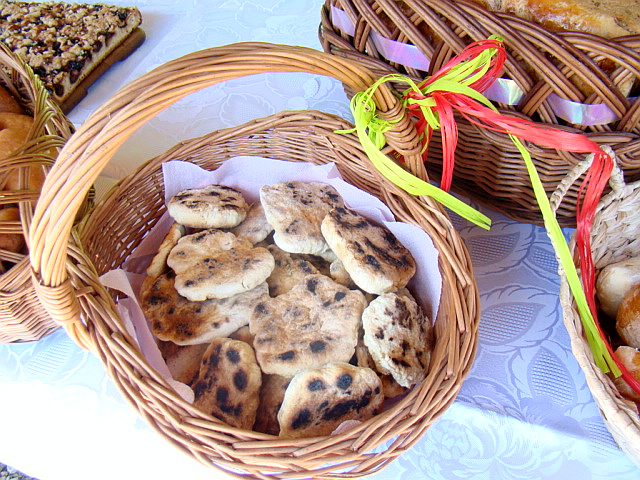
Polish flat soda bread (known as Proziaki in podkarpacie)

== Sports and entertainment ==
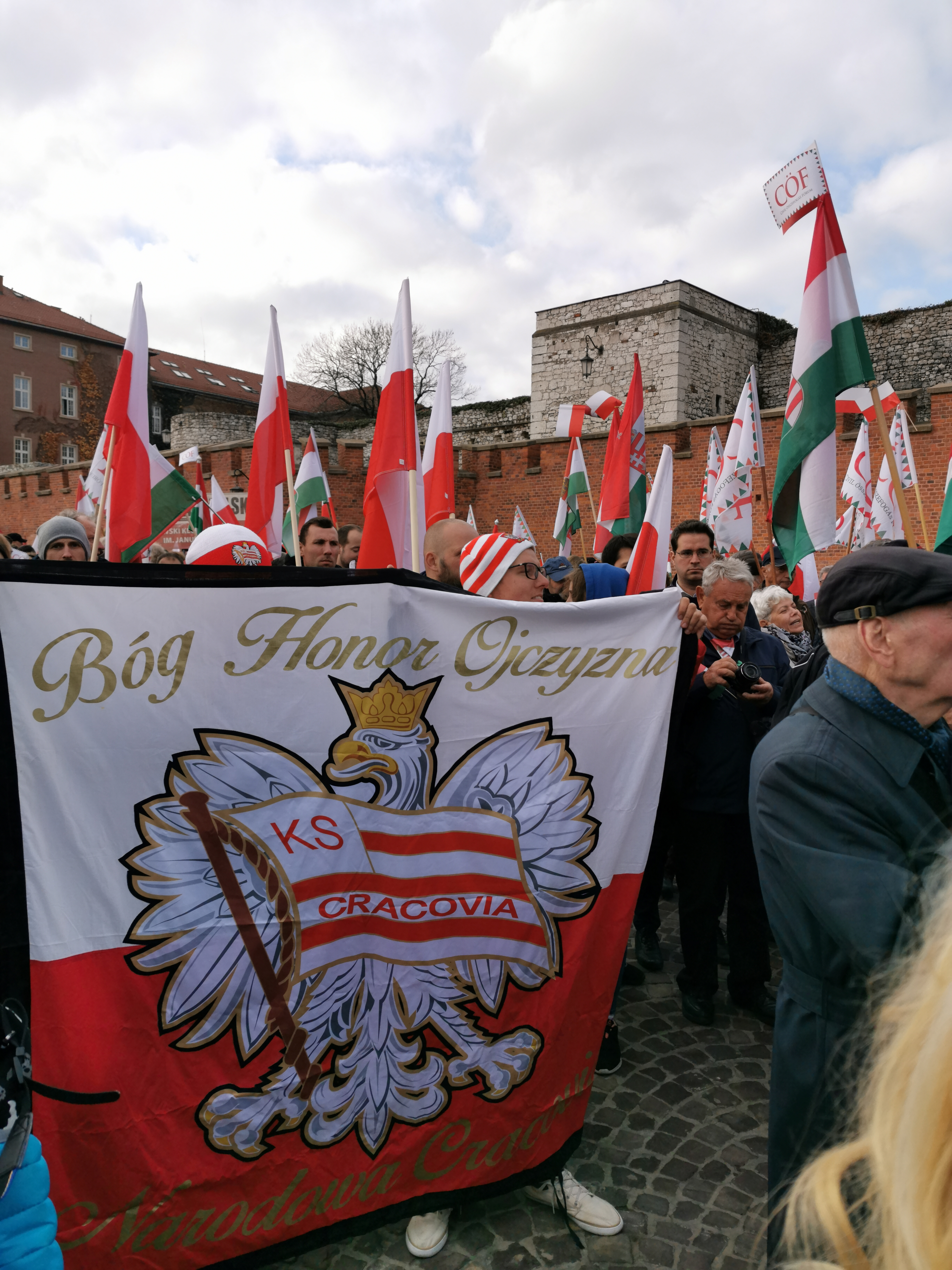
KS Cracovia on Independence Day 2019

Several renowned sportspeople and entertainers come from Lesser Poland. Among them are some of the most famous personalities of contemporary Polish sports – boxer Tomasz Adamek, Formula 1 driver Robert Kubica, swimmer Paweł Korzeniowski, skier Justyna Kowalczyk, tennis player Agnieszka Radwańska, football and volleyball stars Jakub Błaszczykowski, Artur Boruc, and Piotr Gruszka. Among late and retired sports stars who were born in the region, there also are Polish Sportspersonalities of the Year: tennis player and Wimbledon finalist Jadwiga Jędrzejowska, skier Józef Łuszczek, ski jumper Stanisław Marusarz, and driver Sobiesław Zasada.

Kraków's major association football teams – KS Cracovia, and Wisła Kraków, are multiple champions of the country, also Stal Mielec won Polish championship twice (1973, 1976), and Garbarnia Kraków and Raków Częstochowa once each (1931 and 2023). Other popular football teams from Lesser Poland are Zagłębie Sosnowiec (four time Polish Cup winner), Górnik Łęczna, Korona Kielce, Motor Lublin, Radomiak Radom, Stal Stalowa Wola, and Sandecja Nowy Sącz.

Besides association football, Lesser Poland's teams were multiple national champions in other sports:

- ice hockey (Podhale Nowy Targ, TH Unia Oświęcim, Cracovia, KH Zagłębie Sosnowiec),
- men's and women's volleyball – AZS Częstochowa, Płomień Milowice – Sosnowiec (which in 1978 won the CEV Champions League), Hutnik Kraków, Wisła Kraków, BKS Stal Bielsko-Biała, Muszynianka Muszyna,
- men's and women's handball – Hutnik Kraków, Vive Targi Kielce, Cracovia, Montex Lublin,
- men's and women's basketball – Zagłębie Sosnowiec, Cracovia, Wisła Kraków,
- speedway – Włókniarz Częstochowa, Unia Tarnów, Motor Lublin.

Major sports venues of the province are Stadion Miejski im. Henryka Reymana, Stadion Cracovii im. Józefa Piłsudskiego and Tauron Arena Kraków in Kraków, Stadion Miejski, Hala Legionów and Kielce Racetrack in Kielce, Arena Lublin and Hala Globus in Lublin, Miejski Stadion Sportowy "KSZO" w Ostrowcu Sw., Zagłębiowski Park Sportowy in Sosnowiec, Dębowiec Sports Arena in Bielsko-Biała, Arena Częstochowa, Hala Sportowa MOSiR in Radom, Wielka Krokiew in Zakopane.

Among popular rock music bands from Lesser Poland, there are Budka Suflera, Golec uOrkiestra, Maanam, and Zakopower. From Lesser Poland hail composers Jan Kanty Pawluśkiewicz, and Krzysztof Penderecki, as well as singers Basia, Ewa Demarczyk, Justyna Steczkowska, Grzegorz Turnau, Maciej Zembaty. Major music festivals in the province are: Coke Live Music Festival in Kraków, Celtic Music Festival ZAMEK in Będzin, Film Music Festival in Kraków, Gaude Mater in Częstochowa, Boyscout's Festival of School Music in Kielce, Summer with Chopin in Busko-Zdrój, Festiwal of Shanties in Kraków, and Festival of Student Song in Kraków.

== Lesser Polish dialect of Polish ==
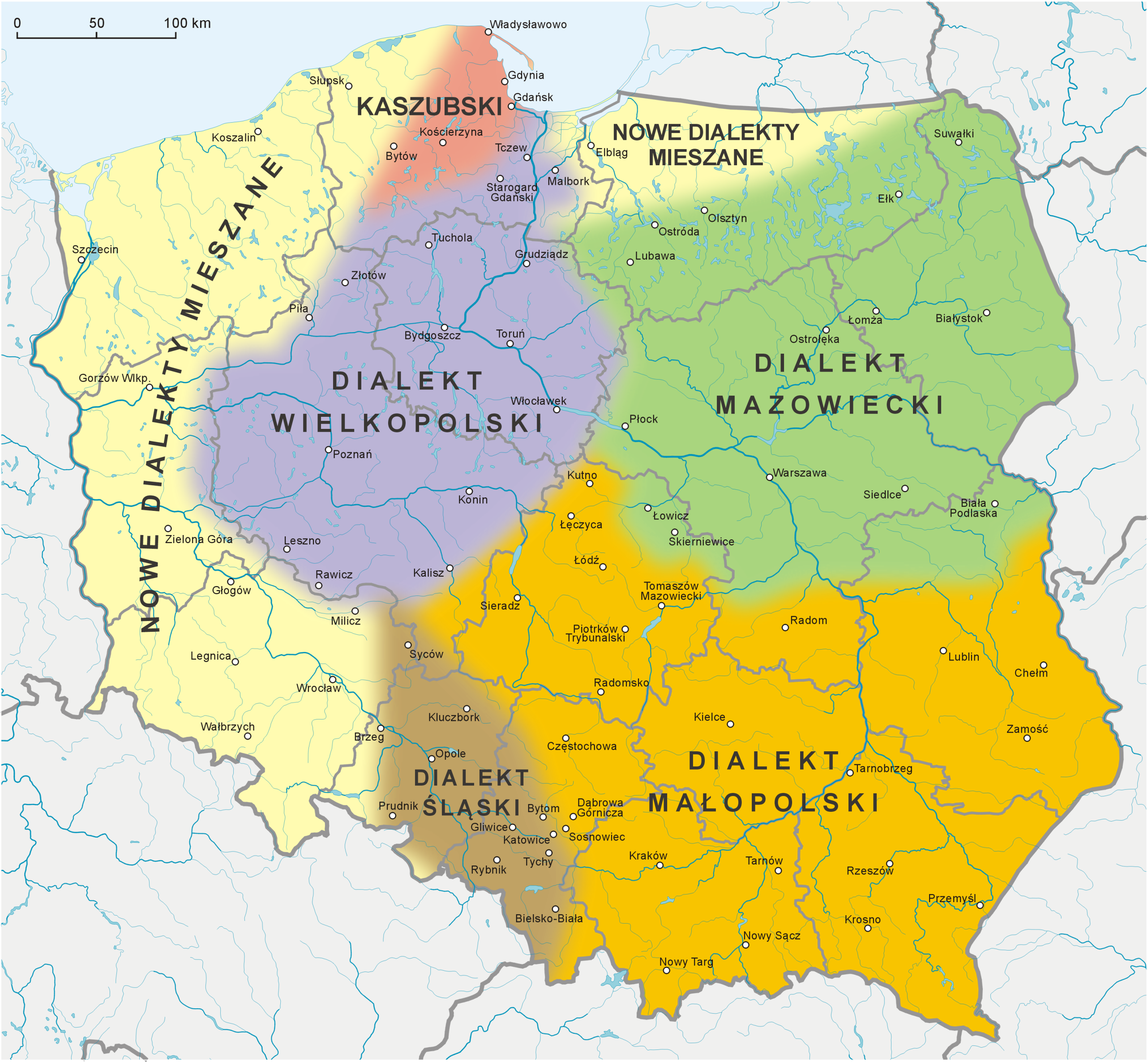
A map of Polish dialects. The area where Lesser Poland's dialect is spoken is marked in orange.

Lesser Polish dialect is spoken in southeastern corner of Poland, both in lands which belong to historical Lesser Poland, and in areas which are not part of the province (around Sieradz and Łęczyca). On the other hand, as seen on the map, the Lesser Polish dialect is not spoken in the extreme northeast of Lesser Poland, in Siedlce and vicinity, where people rather speak Masovian dialect. Descending from the language of the Vistulans, it is the most numerous dialectal group in modern Poland. According to Wincenty Pol, it is divided into three subdivisions: Sandomierz dialect, Lublin dialect, and Sanok dialect.

In the Middle Ages and Renaissance, Lesser Polish dialect, together with Greater Polish dialect, contributed to creation of standard Polish, it also greatly influenced Silesian (see Dialects of Polish), as well as dialects of Polish used in southern part of Kresy Wschodnie. Later on, however, its importance diminished and was replaced by Masovian dialect, which became the leading dialect of Polish. After Partitions of Poland, when Lesser Poland was divided between Austria and Russia, northern areas of the province took over many features of the Masovian dialect, while Lesser Polish dialect in Austrian province of Galicia was heavily influenced by German.

According to Multimedia Guide to Polish Dialects, a webpage maintained by University of Warsaw, Lesser Polish dialect is divided into the following subdialects:

- Mazowsze Borderland (Pogranicze Mazowsza – around Radom and Dęblin),
- Łęczyca (around Łódź, Kutno, Tomaszów Mazowiecki – this part of the country is not historical Lesser Poland),
- Kielce (around Kielce),
- Lasowiacy (north of Rzeszów),
- East Kraków,
- West Lublin,
- East Lublin (this area historically belongs to Chełm Land),
- Przemyśl (historical part of Red Ruthenia/Cherven Cities),
- Biecz,
- Nowy Sącz,
- Podhale,
- Spisz,
- Orawa,
- Żywiec,
- Sieradz,
- Sanok region, or Red-Ruthenian
- Kraków, together with Zagłebie Dąbrowskie.

== See also ==
- Gorals, a group of indigenous people, found in southern Lesser Poland
- Holy Cross Sermons, the oldest existing manuscripts of fine prose in Polish, which come from Lesser Poland
- Lasowiacy, one of subethnic groups, which inhabits Eastern Lesser Poland
- Lesser Polish Gorge of the Vistula
- Malopolski – Polish breed of horse, developed in Lesser Poland
- Wymysorys, a West Germanic micro-language actively spoken in the small town of Wilamowice near Bielsko-Biała, on the border between Silesia and Lesser Poland

== Bibliography ==
- Bedford, Neal (2008). Lonely Planet Poland (6 ed.). Lonely Planet. p. 224. ISBN 978-1-74104-479-9.
- Cosmas of Prague (2006). Kosmasa Kronika Czechów (in Polish). Trans. Maria Wojciechowska. Wrocław. OL 5262807M.
- Davies, Norman (2005). God's Playground: A History of Poland in Two Volumes. Vol. 1. Columbia University Press. ISBN 978-0-19-925339-5.
- Gloger, Zygmunt (1903). Geografia historyczna ziem dawnej Polski (in Polish). Nabu Press. ISBN 978-1-145-33359-8.
- Jezierski, Andrzej; Leszczyńska, Cecylia (2003). Historia gospodarcza Polski (in Polish). Warsaw: Wydawnictwo Key Text. ISBN 83-87251-71-2.
- Labuda, G. (1988). "Polska, Czechy, Rus i kraj Ledzian w drugiej potowie X wieku". Studia nad poczatkami panstwa polskiego (in Polish). Vol. II. Poznań.
- Lerski, Jerzy Jan (1996). "Little (Lesser) Poland (Małopolska)". In Piotr Wróbel, Richard J. Kozicki (ed.). Historical dictionary of Poland. Greenwood Press. ISBN 0-313-26007-9.
