= Sztafeta =

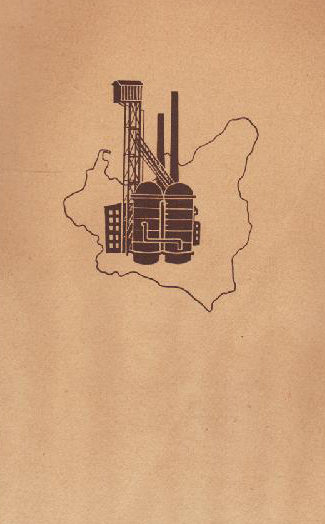
- First edition, front cover
- Author: Melchior Wańkowicz
- Cover artist: Mieczysław Berman
- Language: Polish
- Genre: Creative nonfiction
- Publication date: 1939
- Publication place: Poland

Sztafeta (English: Relay Race) is a 1939 compendium of literary reportage written by Melchior Wańkowicz. It was published in the year of the German-Soviet invasion of Poland. Popular demand caused it to be reprinted four times by the Biblioteka Polska before the outbreak of hostilities. The book was never published in Communist Poland because it praised the democratic achievements of the prewar Second Polish Republic.

It gives an account of one of the biggest economic projects of the newly resurgent interwar Poland, its Central Industrial Area. The work has been described as a "colourful reporter's panorama, telling the story of the recovery of the Second Polish Republic". Ryszard Kapuściński wrote that Sztafeta "was the first grand reportage of its kind in Poland's history – written about Polish production effort". To write the book, Wańkowicz collected a great amount of background information, and he carried out dozens of interviews, starting with President Ignacy Mościcki and ending with sailors, coal miners and primary school teachers.

The book begins with an analysis of the situation of Poland in 1918, right after World War I. The country was in ruins, with two million houses destroyed; industry devastated; poverty, hunger and the threat of a cholera epidemic, all left behind by the Partitions of Poland. It goes on to describe the achievements of the Second Polish Republic, not only about the Central Industrial Area but also about the construction of Gdynia seaport, and of the political scandals such as the annexation of Trans-Olza.

The book was disliked by some members of the military establishment in Poland in 1939. Wańkowicz, they claimed, too frequently criticised the poverty and backwardness of Poland after over a century of foreign occupation.

Wańkowicz, who was one of the first modern Polish reporters to write about the economy, had authored a series of reports about the Central Industrial Area (or the Polish Magnitogorsk, as he called the project). They were published in the Polish press in late 1937 and early 1938, and became so popular that he decided to gather four of them in one volume, C.O.P. Ognisko siły, published in 1938. The book was immediately sold out, as Polish readers loved Wańkowicz's optimism, temperament, national pride and honesty. Impressed by the popularity of C.O.P. Ognisko siły, Wańkowicz began writing a more extensive work on the Central Industrial Area and the development of the Polish economy as a whole.

Sztafeta, with 520 pages, is the result of his efforts. Mariusz Grabowski of Polska The Times, wrote in February 2012 that Sztafeta reads like a national myth, with every page a gem praising Minister of the Treasury Eugeniusz Kwiatkowski and the Sanacja government.

Sztafeta, based on the original 1939 edition, together with a number of photographs and maps by pre-war graphic designer, Mieczysław Berman, was republished in February 2012 by the Warsaw publishing house Prószyński i spółka (whose founder Mieczysław Prószyński is a grandson of Konrad Prószyński), as volume 16 of the collected works of Wańkowicz.

== Contents ==
=== Foreword ===
In the foreword, Wańkowicz states that the title of the book refers to an historic relay race, whose objective is to make Poland a developed and industrial nation. The author also thanks people who contributed to the book, including Ministers Eugeniusz Kwiatkowski, Juliusz Ulrich and Antoni Roman. Wańkowicz writes that the purpose of the book is "To show the real face of Poland and show how Polish people work, to show Poles around their own country in which they are foreigners – it means teaching us to respect ourselves (...) I have tried to undertake this task as best as I can" (page 18).

=== Preface ===
In the preface he touches on the foreign policy of the Second Polish Republic. Wańkowicz claims that the foreign policy of a country is connected with its strength and power. "Foreign policy is a test of finances, military forces, administration and internal order, the psychological density of and the social justice within a nation". As Wańkowicz states, from the very beginning, the Second Polish Republic had to find its place among the victorious nations of World War I, according to the Treaty of Versailles. "History has taught us that we will not prosper under the Treaty, and that we are condemned to handle everything ourselves (...) The Treaty and the spirit of its creators tried to create Poland as one of small Eastern European states. As a result, Gdańsk was not granted to Poland, Trans-Olza was given to the Czechs, eastern borders were limited, and the Little Treaty of Versailles was imposed on Poland (...) [Since 1933], Poland has distanced itself from the Treaty of Versailles, as its failing structure does not attract us. Since then, we have been trying to maintain a policy of balance between our two neighbours (...) Even though the Locarno Treaties gave France the right for an armed intervention in case of the Remilitarization of the Rhineland, even though England, Italy, Belgium and Poland were obliged to actively support France, the French did not make any decision". Furthermore, Wańkowicz claims that the May Coup of 1926 may have been connected with Germany's admission into the League of Nations, since Józef Piłsudski came to the conclusion that under the circumstances, he should take control of both the foreign policy and the army of Poland. (pages 19–23).

=== De profundis ===
- Start Polski (Poland's beginning)

This chapter is in memory of the destruction of Polish lands as a result of World War I and other military conflicts, such as the Polish–Soviet War. Compared to France, where only the northeastern provinces were devastated, the Great War resulted in widespread destruction of almost the entire territory of the Second Polish Republic. In 1914–1921, almost two million buildings were destroyed, together with 56% of the rolling stock, 64% of railway stations, 390 larger and 2019 smaller bridges. Losses to Polish industry were estimated at 1 billion 800 million zlotys, four and half million hectares of land were left uncultivated, 4 million head of cattle were killed, 3 million people were forced to leave their homes, 130 million cubic meters of timber were taken out of Poland. According to the Polish census of 1921, thousands of people were forced to live in 75,000 cowsheds, pigsties and shacks. "War has brought destruction to all the provinces of Poland, except for those which had belonged to the Kingdom of Prussia (...) Starving people read with disbelief in the newspapers that as part of World War I reparations, even transports of German beehives headed towards France (...) We have inherited a divided, destroyed Poland, whose lands had for almost 150 years belonged to three different countries (see Partitions of Poland). We have been given a Fatherland moulded out of our traditions, language and the love of our hearts. But economically, it was but a mix of the neglected borderlands of the three foreign nations" (page 31).

Wańkowicz recalls an epidemic of typhus and cholera, which took place in the Soviet Union in 1921. At that time, Polish government created a 40 to 60 kilometer wide barrier implemented to stop the spread of disease, along the Polish – Soviet border. One of the biggest quarantine centers was at Baranowicze, where 10,000 people were treated daily, and 40,000 kilograms of clothes were washed every day. Altogether, 182 Polish doctors and nurses died at the Baranowicze quarantine center, and in 1923, a monument dedicated to them was unveiled there: "Over the dead bodies, we headed towards the reconstruction of Poland" (page 37).

- Start COP-u (The COP beginnings)

In this chapter, Wańkowicz describes his pre-World War I adventures, when with friends he hiked across the future Central Industrial Area, which before 1914 had been divided between the Russian Empire and Austria-Hungary. Those lands, the heart of Poland, had nothing in common: "Eighty per cent of our rail traffic just serves the triangle of Upper Silesia–Warsaw–Lwów. This triangle is empty inside (...) The distance between Vistula river bridges can reach up to 70 kilometers. The population of the center of Poland, the area bounded by the Pilica, the Bug rivers and the Beskids mountain range, which amounts 5 million people, is suffocating due to unemployment and small farms. Urbanization had not taken place in those borderlands of Russia and Austria-Hungary. In the Central Industrial Area, 418,000 people are simply redundant. They may go away, but where to? (...) The Central part of Poland is just rotting. As Marshal Józef Piłsudski once said, Poland is like a bagel, in which anything good lies on the edges. And along these edges we have hostile neighbours" (pages 41–47)

Wańkowicz reminds the reader that other nations had also decided to move their industrial centers away from borders. Soviet Union located its main factories in the Urals, and Nazi Germany in the area between the Weser and the Elbe. "This land, forgotten by God, we shall lift up through the Central Industrial Area, and the Area itself shall be surrounded by highly developed agriculture" (page 52).

- Smok pod polską Weroną (A dragon afoot in Poland's Verona)

The Polish symbolic and metaphorical Verona is the historic town of Sandomierz, which, according to the plans, was to become the capital of the Central Industrial Area, and of the projected Sandomierz Voivodeship (1939). Similar to Verona (Italy), Sandomierz was famous for its Renaissance architecture but little else. "Nothing has changed here since I visited this town as a kid..." (Wańkowicz). However, the town's location was excellent, as distances to other industrial towns in the region were equally close including Nisko, Opatów, Kielce, Radom, Lublin, Łańcut, Dębica and Pińczów (pp. 55–58).

The chapter describes the current and a potential future of Sandomierz, with new investments, estimated at almost 7 million zlotys. "Meanwhile I do not see any changes in Sandomierz, and neither would Berke see them, whose forces in 1260 faced some 8,000 residents of the town; the same population as now (...) Sandomierz is such a careless town. The seat of the voivode and of the local Polish Army infantry division is in Kielce. The Provincial court, rail and forest management offices are in Radom. School district in Ostrowiec. Post office district management in Lublin, insurance office in Tarnobrzeg, tax office in Opatów, and even the rail station lies on the eastern shore of the Vistula, in a different province. It is touching to watch this careless chaos, to watch the old order of things, knowing that the future will change it all for good (...) Admirers of the Polish Verona may sleep well" (pages 58–61).

=== Ujarzmianie wody (Taming of the waters) ===
- Z kałuży – rzeka

This chapter is dedicated to hydropower, and different means of obtaining energy from water. Wańkowicz recollects the disastrous 1934 flood in Poland, which caused damages estimated at 75 million zlotys. One year after the disaster, construction of the Dunajec river dam and a power plant began at the village of Rożnów, near the site of a medieval castle. According to the plans from the 1930s, the government of the Second Polish Republic envisaged construction of 27 reservoirs in the Vistula Basin, and 19 reservoirs in the Dniestr Basin. Wańkowicz himself visited the Rożnów Dam construction site in the autumn of 1938, and the book contains several photos from that visit.

Further on, the chapter tells about future plans for the Vistula river. Wańkowicz predicts that the Vistula would emerge as the most important trade corridor of Poland. To make it happen, the largest river of Poland would have to be deepened and regulated. As the author writes, the three most important public works projects of Poland are: Gdynia, Central Industrial Area, and the Vistula: "To connect the Vistula with the Central Area, by regulating the whole length of the river. To make it happen, we need 20 million [zlotys] every year for 30 years (...) Meanwhile, a lot will happen in the Central Area. The plans specify regulation of the Vistula from Oświęcim to Sandomierz (...) In the fields near Koprzywnica, hundreds of workers toil. They are the unemployed, brought here from Częstochowa. Those with wagons are the so-called Dutchmen; the inhabitants of the village of Zabuże (near Sokal). Their ancestors came to Poland to escape religious persecution. They are talented at earthwork, and are seen all over the Central Area" (pages 68–94).

=== Stalowa Wola (Steel Will) ===
Wańkowicz begins this chapter by recollecting the Polish–Soviet War of 1919–1920. In late July 1920, he visited the Free City of Danzig, witnessing a British steamboat Triton, filled with weapons and ammunition for the Polish Army. German-speaking longshoremen at the Port of Danzig refused to unload it, while the Czechoslovaks would not let rail transports pass through their country. At that time, as Wańkowicz wrote, Poland was "a nation, which did not have its own seaport and its own arms industry" (page 96). Gdynia was built after the humiliation of 1920, and in the late 1930s, Poland initiated the construction of, as Wańkowicz named it, the Polish Magnitogorsk.

Stalowa Wola was built from scratch, 35 kilometers from Sandomierz, 6 kilometers from Rozwadów, and 11 kilometers from Nisko, in the perfect center of the Central Industrial Area. 600 hectares of land were built for the project, which took place in the village of Pławo. The first pine tree was cut down on March 20, 1937: "Now, there is a row of pavilions, with newly built rail connections. We are standing in one of these houses, whose roof covers the area of two hectares. Altogether, some nine hectares will be under roofs (...) The plant will receive three kinds of energy: electric, gas and coal". (page 101)

The construction of Southern Works, as Huta Stalowa Wola was called, gave employment to 2,500 people, additional 1,500 built the town: "We do not have any Vickers, Armstrongs, or Schneiders. We work using Polish factories. Here, Zgoda, Zieleniewski, Ostrowiec, and Jenike shook hands (...) The plant will employ 4,000, new settlement, with sewer system, laundries, baths, casinos and sports facilities is being built. The settlement will be located around the plant, so that workers should reach the factory as quickly and as easily as possible". (pages 103–104)

Wańkowicz reminds that since the November Uprising (1831), no arms plant had been built in any part of the divided Poland: "We had neither gold to purchase weapons, nor roads for the transport of them (...) We dreamt about a fully independent Poland, and the idea of Old-Polish Industrial Region was brought back (...) The creators of new Poland will need strong will, the willingness to complete all plans. Therefore, the idea to give the name Stalowa Wola [Steel Will] to the town which will manufacture steel, was a fortunate one". (pages 106–112)

=== Siekiera – motyka – piłka – kleszcze (Axe, Hoe) ===
The chapter begins with the description of Rzeszów, the town which used to be called the Galician Jerusalem. As part of Austria-Hungary, it was dirt poor and destitute, like the whole province of Galicia: "Now, a convoy of shiny Buicks and Fiats enters Rzeszów, together with three buses of Polish State Railways. We are heading towards the enormous complex of the Polskie Zakłady Lotnicze [Polish Aviation Works] factory of plane engines. The factory occupies the area of 21 hectares, and will employ 2,000 (...) Next we are going to see the H. Cegielski – Poznań branch plant [now Zelmer Rzeszów], located at the other end of the town. Construction of the Cegielski factory began on April 20, 1937, in an old Austrian armoury (...) Poland needs machine tools for some 30 million zlotys a year, while national production reaches 7 million zlotys (...) Rzeszów turns into an industrialized town. Its fathers now have to think about new flats for workers, waterworks and sewages, power plant, shops, schools, hospital, bridge and green areas. When I leave Rzeszów, I see the monument of Colonel Leopold Lis-Kula". (pages 115–124)

=== Siedzi sobie ruda pod miedzą – geolodzy o niej już wiedzą (Ore at the baulk: geologists can tell) ===
This chapter discusses the need to establish Poland's own resources of iron ore. Wańkowicz states that Nazi Germany after the Anschluss seized the Erzberg mine, with 300 million tons of iron ore, out of which several military products are made. In the ancient times, iron ore was excavated in the Świętokrzyskie Mountains, "Now [early 1939], southern corner of Poland is full of posters, urging residents to hand any heavy stones found by them to the government, in exchange of 5 zlotys (...) A farmer named Boroń, who resides in Gogołów near Frysztak, sent a stone which was rich in iron. The government sent experts, handing Boroń additional 1,000 zloty reward for his finding. They established the iron ore deposits here, and now are considering further examination of the area (...) And when we look at the roads crowded with people, when we look at the Jews, minding their own businesses, we realize that we are one of the most densely populated nations of Europe. That this population density is not based on industry or commerce, but on poverty. And we see this country in ten years, through the eyes of our young engineers" (pages 132–151).

=== Opona z kartofla (Synthetic rubber) ===
Wańkowicz begins this chapter by recalling his first sight of an automobile, which took place in Kraków, in the early 20th century. Natural rubber has been in rising demand since early days of the automobile industry, and in plantations across the world, in Brazil, the Congo or Liberia, locals were being slaughtered by Westerners searching for rubber trees. In 1938, the world used one million tons of natural rubbers, for the estimated 40 million vehicles, 80% of which were owned by Americans. Poland, with a fledgling automobile industry, also needed natural rubber, the purchase of which was difficult and expensive. The only solution was synthetic rubber (pages 154–156).

Wańkowicz recalls first Polish attempts at creating synthetic rubber, and compares them to the Germans, working at IG Farben, as well as Soviet efforts of the early 1930s. Due to the work of such persons, as minister Wojciech Świętosławski, Professor Kazimierz Kling and Wacław Szukiewicz of Warsaw's Chemical Research Institute, Polish synthetic rubber made from potatoes, and called KER (an acronym for Kauczuk ERytrenowy), was produced in 1935. In August 1938, Chemical Works S.A. (currently Polifarb Dębica) was opened in the village of Pustynia near Dębica. The ready product was used by another factory, which was opened in the late 1930s in the same town – Tire Company Stomil Dębica (which currently is owned by the Goodyear Tire and Rubber Company).

=== Siły pod ziemią (Minerals under the earth) ===
- Łukasiewiczowe bogactwo

In this chapter Wańkowicz recalls his childhood, spent in the village of Nowotrzeby, located in Polish Eastern Borderlands. Since there was no electricity, light was provided by several kerosene lamps. As late as 1938, such lamps were a rarity in several regions of the Second Polish Republic.

Among pioneers of kerosene industry were such names, as Abraham Schreiner, Ignacy Łukasiewicz, and Jan Zeh. Due to their work, first kerosene lamps were lit in the municipal hospital of the city of Lwów, in 1853. It was Łukasiewicz who opened first oil well Małgorzata in Polish lands. His well was 180 meters deep, and was located at the village of Jaszczew. Next came oil refinery at the village of Polanka, which now is a district of Krosno (pages 174–182). In 1881, a Canadian resident William H. McGarvey came to Austrian Galicia. Among other places, he worked at Borysław, which, as Wańkowicz put it, in the 1890s was a Polish Klondike. McGarvey cooperated with a man named Władysław Długosz (who would in the future work for the National Oil Association of Poland), and due to their efforts, as well as many other entrepreneurs, the production of oil in Galicia, mostly in Borysław, Krosno, Słoboda Rungurska and Schodnica near Lwów, reached 2 million tons in 1909. In that year, some 10,000 people were employed in Galicia's oil industry. After the peak, oil prices went down, which resulted in a number of bankruptcies. Before World War I, Galicia produced app. 3% of world's oil (pages 182–192).

Following World War I, the Polish–Ukrainian War broke out in eastern Galicia. Oil wells of the region were of particular importance, and on Sunday, May 17, 1919, the suburbs of Drohobycz were captured by a mounted company of 180 men, led by Colonel Stanisław Maczek. After a battle with the Ukrainians, the cities of Drohobycz and nearby Borysław were seized by the Poles on the next day: "Polish lands were destroyed, powerless and fallow. And here, we had gold in our hands. In those years, we bought everything for that oil, even beans from Yugoslavia" (page 192).

- Gazownię – zbudował sam Pan Bóg (Natural gas plant made by God himself)

This chapter is dedicated to natural gas, and the history of its exploration in Polish lands. Wańkowicz writes that when in 1890 gas was found in Potok, (a village between Krosno and Jasło), the locals thought of it as a misfortune, and poured water on the source: "As late as 1932, when I came to Stryj on a sunny midday, I noticed with surprise that all street lamps were turned on (...) Local people explained to me that it did not make any sense to turn off the lamps, as they were fueled by natural gas, which was free" (page 198). First Polish pipeline was built in 1912. It was 9 kilometers long, and went from Borysław to the refinery at Drohobycz. In 1921, a natural gas well was opened at Daszawa near Stryj, and in 1928, the Polmin corporation opened a pipeline from Daszawa to Drohobycz, later reaching Lwów. Several new pipelines were opened in eastern Galicia in the mid-1930s, and in 1937, a 200-kilometer pipeline connected Roztoki with Starachowice: "Currently, new lines to Radom, Pionki, Nisko and Skarżysko-Kamienna are being built" (page 205).

- Polski Dawid i angielski Goliat (Polish David and English Goliath)

Before World War I, Polish coal mining was divided between three countries. Upper Silesia served the German Empire, Zagłębie Dąbrowskie sold its coal to Ukraine (part of the Russian Empire at the time), and the Kraków Coal Basin was part of Austria-Hungary. Altogether, in 1914, 40 million tons of coal were excavated in the divided Polish lands. After the war, however, Polish coal lost its markets. Production remained high, still at 40 million tons, while demand in the newly created Second Polish Republic was some 18 million tons. The only solution was to export Polish coal, but by 1925, Poland exported only .5 million tons a year: "The coal strike in England came in 1926, at the best possible time for Poland, but we had no means to transport our coal to Scandinavia, which had been main market of British coal. Gdynia was not ready yet, the Free City of Danzig was out of question, and the Polish Coal Trunk-Line was not completed (...) So, a Polish David was facing a British Goliath" (pages 208–211).

To reach the lucrative Scandinavian markets, Polish merchants travelled north, trying to convince the Scandinavians to purchase Polish coal. Furthermore, after the general strike had ended in the United Kingdom, the British wanted to return to Scandinavia with their coal. In 1931, Great Britain dropped the gold standard, which resulted in lower export prices for their products. In response, the Polish government opened a special offset fund, valued at 5 million zlotys. Both sides decided to enter negotiations, which took place simultaneously at Warsaw and London. Finally, a treaty was signed in 1934, with further changes in 1937 (pages 211–216).

Wańkowicz himself went to Giszowiec, a district of Katowice, to see with his own eyes the process of coal mining. Together with the manager of a local coal mine, engineer Michejda, he went 400 meters underground: "I will never let my wife enter a coal mine, says one of the engineers. You never know what may happen at any moment (...) There are many dangers at a coal mine. Apart from rock burst, there is water and natural gas. Therefore, managers of the mine are in constant struggle with these elements (...) I am leaving industrial Upper Silesia, driving my car towards Cieszyn. Behind me stays a Polyphemus of the Polish lands. East of it, a new center of power is being built – the Central Industrial Area (pages 216–224).

=== Z Polski leśnej i polnej w Polskę zbrojną i przemysłową (From rural to industrial Poland) ===
Wańkowicz begins this chapter by recalling the destruction, caused by the senseless de-forestation in the northeastern portion of the Second Polish Republic (currently this area belongs to Belarus). By the late 1930s, due to the invention of cellulose, Polish forests ceased to be depleted. A brand new cellulose factory was opened in the town of Niedomice, 15 kilometers from Tarnów. The factory was built from July 1935 to November 1937, on an 80-hectare plot of wet meadow, purchased from the Sanguszko family: "The Niedomice plant daily uses 50,000 cubic meters of water from the Dunajec, while the city of Warsaw uses 80,000 cubic meters of water (...) It processes spruce from the Carpathians and the Kresy, and among its products there is silk. Furthermore, thanks to the existence of the Niedomice plant, we will no longer have to import nitrocellulose, as it will be replaced by Polish-made cellulose (...) And when I look at the mighty machines, crushing the immense tree trunks into little splinters, I think of the wasteful economy of the past generations, and I am thankful that there is a provident hand, which begins to rule the Polish national household". (pages 226–240)

=== Plon niesiemy, plon (Harvest we gather) ===
This chapter is dedicated to nitrogen, nitrates, and their importance in as fertilizers in agriculture. Wańkowicz visits a large nitrogen plant located in Mościce (Zjednoczone Fabryki Związków Azotowych Mościce), reminding his readers that the Mościce plant is a younger "brother" of the Chorzów Nitrogen Works (which were opened in 1915 as Oberschlesische Stickstoffwerke, in then-German Konigshutte).

On June 15, 1922, following the Silesian Uprisings, units of the Polish Army entered the so-called Eastern Upper Silesia, which became the Autonomous Silesian Voivodeship. Among numerous plants and enterprises that came under Polish control, was the modern Oberschlesische Stickstoffwerke plant, the brainchild of Nikodem Caro. Polish experts, headed by Ignacy Mościcki, were surprised to find all 196 German specialists abandon their posts. Furthermore, the Germans took with them all documents and specifications of the plant. All left Poland for the nearby Beuthen, awaiting the collapse of the plant under inexperienced Polish leadership. To make matters worse, those German workers that remained in Chorzów carried out acts of sabotage.

In April 1923, Eugeniusz Kwiatkowski, together with Adam Podoski, came to Chorzów. By then, almost all workers had been replaced, and the new, Polish-speaking crew brought the production to the pre-1921 level. Poles concentrated their efforts at manufacturing calcium cyanamide, which in the 1920s and 1930s was commonly used as a fertilizer. In 1923, 39,000 tons of calcium cyanide was produced at Chorzów; by 1929, the production grew to 166,000 tons. Still, it was not enough for the Polish agriculture, so construction of a new plant at Mościce near Tarnów was initiated by a number of specialists from Chorzów, headed by Eugeniusz Kwiatkowski (pages 240–254).

=== Sztafeta dziejów (Relay race of history) ===
Wańkowicz begins this chapter by reminding the readers that Second Polish Republic is a very poor country, which is confirmed on each page of the Polish Statistical Yearbook. Poland, however used to be a rich country, which lost is wealth and capital due to the stupidity of the Polish nobility, which did not invest the money and did not have any plans concerning national economy, preferring to spend its funds on expensive clothes and oriental specialties. "Let us compare what other nations did after the discovery of America. In Holland mighty plants were opened, which manufactured various goods and exported them all over the world. France invested large sums of money in infrastructure, such as Canal du Midi, army and navy (...) At the same time the nobility in Poland spent its money on never ending balls and parties (...) Aleksander Brückner writes that day after day at the Lubomirski family residence at Dubno, 300 people partied, that rivers of gold flew at Annopol of the Jabłonowski family, Tuczyn of the Walewski family, Korzec of the Czartoryski family, Sławuta of the Sanguszko family". (pages 267–270)

Despite some positive changes, the economy of the Polish–Lithuanian Commonwealth continued to deteriorate in the 18th century. In 1777, Polish banks spent one million zlotys a month purchasing luxurious imported goods from Paris: "Piotr Fergusson Tepper once said that annually, Poland imports 36,000 barrels of wine from Hungary, and that it was easier to find Polish currency in Paris than in Warsaw. This whole economy of Polish elites resulted in bankruptcies and poverty. As Jędrzej Kitowicz writes, there was such a shortage of money in Poland, that in circulation were coins manufactured during the reign of King Jan Kazimierz. And then Prussian times came, marked by the total decline of the Polish economy. The population of Warsaw dropped from 200,000 to 60,000, and foreigners compared it to Tyre and Carthage". (page 274)

The situation began to improve after the creation of Congress Poland, due to the efforts of Stanisław Staszic, when iron plants were opened between Radom and Sandomierz, at Suchedniów and Końskie (see also Old-Polish Industrial Region). Failure of the November Uprising stopped the development of Congress Poland, but soon afterwards Piotr Steinkeller initiated a program of industrialization and modernization: "A few years passed after the defeat of 1831. Railroads had been constructed, Russian Empire opened to the Polish goods, and for the first time in years, we managed to halt the decline. But it did not last for long. The January Uprising, which cost our nation 20,000 dead, 50,000 sent to Siberia, once again destroyed our economic future". (page 287)

=== Wyprawa po jeńców elektrycznych (Expedition for the electrical captives) ===
This chapter is dedicated to electricity and electrification of Poland. In 1921, after Poland regained independence, the average citizen of the nation used 7.5 watts of power, with the Polish part of Upper Silesia using 82 watts per person. Given the fact that at the same time, there were nations which used more than 2,000 watts per person, Poland's electrification was nonexistent: "And now we are standing in a power plant at Mościce (...) Currently, the price of one kilowatt hour of energy in Warsaw is 60 groszy, but when construction of power plants and power lines is completed, the price will go down to 15 groszy. In 1940, the cheap energy will reach Warsaw, before that, cheap energy will reach Starachowice and Rzeszów". (pages 304–312)

=== Na co koza rogi ma (Why do goats have horns) ===
Wańkowicz goes on to remind the reader that widespread poverty was one of major problems of the Second Polish Republic: "Ten million people do not have enough food and do not have a permanent job. Ten million unemployed only in the countryside without those from urban communities (...) They are a dead material, which has to be fed, which has to work, which has to go beyond simple animalistic needs (...) Eighty per cent of Poland lies outside of the Central Industrial Area. These people dream about the COP, awaiting a better future" (page 314). The author cites letters, which were sent to him from different parts of the country. An osadnik named Kostrzewski, from the village of Chocieńczyce (near Wilejka), writes: "I am surprised by the fact that the Soviets make great propaganda about their Dneprostroi, while a book about Polish efforts is being published only now". (page 316).

In the summer 1938 Wańkowicz visited the village of Zaleszany, near Sandomierz. On a Sunday after the service local residents left church to watch construction of a pipeline: "Among the crowd watching the construction site, nobody knows what these pipes are for and who needs them. These are the people who worked for 80 grosz a day. They have all their constitutional rights, they elect the government, but they have no idea about the pipes". (page 319) According to Wańkowicz, the most important category of laborers in the eyes of the locals are welders. They make up to 600 zlotys a month: "These welders, mostly young guys, are dressed like Primadonnas. Four of them rent a house, they come from different parts of Poland: Borysław, Lwów, Dąbrowa Basin, and Warsaw. sett pavers come to the Central Industrial Area from Gdynia, earth workers from the area of the Bug river, fitters are from Upper Silesia and Warsaw, bricklayers come from Iwieniec, and qualified metal workers are from Poznań and Radom. Thus, all hands from across Poland are building her heart".(pages 318–319).

Melchior Wańkowicz emphasizes the fact that increasing number of laborers, coming to the Central Industrial Area, means that their children attend local schools, which are not prepared for such an influx of new pupils: "Within a few months, 150 new children flooded a school at Ćmielów. At Denków [now a district of Ostrowiec Świętokrzyski], 600 kids study in two shifts in one crowded schoolhouse (...) Within a few months, 1,000 Poles expelled from France with their children settled in Iłża County. Radom itself needs at least seven new schools (...) And what with Mielec, which is expanding quickly, but no news of any new schools? What about Rozalin, what about Kraśnik, where a brand new town is being built near the old one?" (pages 326–329)

=== Arterioskleroza ===
This chapter is dedicated to different kinds of communication – railroads, roads, telecommunication, and airplanes. To operate, a modern plant needs three things: electricity, natural gas and coal. In the Second Polish Republic, deposits of coal were located in southwestern corner of the country, some 250 kilometers from Central Industrial Area. It had to be brought to central Poland in a quick and cheap way.

- Krwiobieg

Wańkowicz interviewed deputy Minister of Communications, Konrad Piasecki, who promised that in the six coming years, Polish government would annually spend on communication 60 million zlotys: "40,000 meters of spruce from the area of Wilno are annually transported to the plant at Niedomice. These transports have to travel 112 extra kilometers, as there is no rail line from Ostrowiec Świętokrzyski to Szczucin (...) Iron ore has been found near Jasło. It will be delivered to Southern Works at Stalowa Wola, travelling 207 kilometers, instead of 123 kilometers, as there is no rail connection between Jasło and Dębica. These are just a few examples, as everyone knows that construction is impossible in the areas with no roads and no rail transport".(pages 340–344)

In the late 1910s, the newly born Second Polish Republic had no common rail system, as it was made of rail systems of three powers that had divided Poland (Russian Empire, German Empire, Austria-Hungary). Different were tracks, signals, brakes, engines, cars, regulations, tariffs and tools. Rail transport suffered from World War I destruction, yet it not only had to support Polish Army units, but also civilian population. Everything was improvised, and in the 1920, the nation was invaded. The Soviets were close to capturing 220 engines and 7,560 cars, which were being withdrawn westwards. In six weeks, Polish rail workers managed to turn 400 kilometers of Russian gauge track into the standard gauge (from Baranowicze to Dęblin), thus saving Polish rolling stock. In the first years of the Second Polish Republic, rail transport was very difficult; it took 22 hours to travel from Warsaw to Wilno, due to a destroyed bridge near Grodno: "Now, the prophecy of Ferdinand de Lesseps is becoming reality. The developer of the Suez Canal stated that Warsaw would emerge as major rail hub of Europe, as here three international lines meet: Paris – Berlin – Warsaw – Moscow; Gdynia – Warsaw – Lwów – Balkan Peninsula; Helsinki – Riga – Wilno – Warsaw – Katowice – southern Europe". (pages 343–349)

- Unerwienie (The central nervous system)

In 1938, there were 250,000 telephones in Poland. To speed up the process of modernization of Polish telecommunication, a brand new telephone equipment factory was being built at Poniatowa, which was planned to give employment to 4,000 people. By the end of 1937, 720 kilometers of long distance cable connections had been laid, connecting Sandomierz with Kielce, Rzeszów, Rozwadów, Tarnobrzeg and Lublin. Completion of cable connection between Warsaw and Sandomierz was planned for late 1939, and in 1940, Warsaw was to receive long-distance cable connection with Lwów. (pages 353–358)

- Do lamusa z koczobrykami

This chapter is dedicated to air transport. Wańkowicz writes that the National Meteorological Institute (Państwowy Instytut Meteorologiczny) has 160 co-workers, scattered across Poland. They make weather reports, updated every few hours, reporting them by telegraph or telephone to the central office in Warsaw: "Our Baltic Sea shore makes only 2.5% of our borderline. But nobody will smother us by our neck, when there are wings in our arms". (pages 359–368)

The first Polish long-distance international flight took place in 1926, when Captain Bolesław Orliński, together with his mechanic, Leon Kubiak, flew from Warsaw to Tokyo, and back. In February 1927, Tadeusz Karpiński asked for permission to fly over the Atlantic, but did not receive it. The 1932 Challenge International de Tourisme was won by Franciszek Żwirko and Stanisław Wigura, both of whom died in a plane crash in the same year. Three weeks after their death, Tadeusz Karpiński flies 14,000 kilometers in a Lublin R-X plane from Warsaw to Palestine, through Syria, Persia, Afghanistan and Iraq. In 1934, Joe and Ben Adamowicz flew over the Atlantic.

In the 1930s, ballooning was very popular in Poland, with such personalities as pilot Franciszek Hynek and navigator Zbigniew Burzyński, both of whom twice won the Gordon Bennett Cup. Wańkowicz recalls the 1935 Cup, which took place in Warsaw. Burzyński, together with Colonel Władysław Wysocki, flew far into Soviet territory, and were attacked by the Soviet Air Force planes. Finally, they landed near the Don river, crossing 1,650 kilometers in 57 hours and 54 minutes. Apart from long-distance balloon flights, Polish pilots tried to break the high altitude world record, but the Gwiazda Polski balloon burned on October 14, 1938.

"The time is near, when we will be making our own large passenger planes. Our first prototype of such machine, the PZL.44 Wicher, apparently is better, faster and more spacious than the Douglas DC-2. Not a single month passes without news about our pilots. Now, we should think about the youth. We should make flying common among them! (...) We already have the sailplane high altitude world record of Kazimierz Antoniak (3,435 meters). We have women's sailplane long distance world record of Wanda Modlibowska (24 hours and 14 minutes), and finally, we have the 1938 Lilienthal Gliding Medal, granted to Tadeusz Góra for his May 18, 1938 flight from Bezmiechowa Górna to Soleczniki (577,8 kilometers). (...) Currently, the Airborne and Antigas Defence League has 1,7 million members, which makes 5% of Poland's population". (pages 380–382)

=== Gdynia – świat ===
- To nie Somosierra morska

Wańkowicz begins this chapter by analyzing what the notion of independence means: "Are the Philippines or Cuba more independent than the Irish Free State, because their governments are more free?" The author then goes on to recall the Polish–Soviet War, when in 1920 all land borders of the newly restored Poland were closed down, and the German longshoremen at Danzig did not want to help with unloading transports of ammunition for the fighting nation: "Where was our independence, when after the Bolshevik war we wanted to sell first 100,000 tons of our cement, and foreign ship-owners, influenced by foreign cement makers, did not want to transport it, and we did not have our ships?"

The Second Polish Republic had only 74 kilometers of Baltic Sea shoreline. In the Middle Ages, Poland ruled a much wider shoreline, with such ports, as Gdańsk, Kołobrzeg, Kamień Pomorski, Szczecin (Wańkowicz spells it Szczucin), Wolin. Wańkowicz recalls Polish efforts at keeping its sea connections, such as Pomeranian wars of Bolesław III Wrymouth, and Poland's failure, when in 1598 King Sigismund III Vasa, after receiving 300,000 zlotys from the Sejm, set on to the Kingdom of Sweden with a fleet of 60 ships, and an army of 5,000 (see: War against Sigismund).

"We failed at sea. It served us across centuries, but somebody else transported goods from Poland (...) In 1920, the English ship "Triton" stood on the Motława, filled with ammunition for the bleeding country. It stood there motionless, as Danzig did not allow it to be unloaded. And at the same time, Polish authorities began looking for a spot for the construction of a new port" (pages 384–388).

Finally, Gdynia was chosen, the very same spot mentioned by Hetman Stanisław Koniecpolski, who wrote to King Władysław IV Vasa, stating that it was a very convenient location for a sea port: "Now, if Stefan Żeromski was still alive, we would take him here. We would show him the 12-kilometer long wharf, the giant warehouses with total area of 217,000 sq. m., the granary, the 75 cranes (...) The total tonnage of our merchant navy grew from 9,000 tons in 1927, to 100,000 tons in 1938 (...) We need Gdynia like all humans need lungs. Right now, 75% of our foreign trade goes through this city. In case of a war, we will need it more than anything else. Our merchant navy, our transport navy needs protection. It is our new task. First we needed a port. Then we needed ships. Now we need to defend them". (pages 388–397)

- Hejże na śledzia!

This chapter describes Wańkowicz's visit to Gdynia, which took place in early May 1938. He witnessed the May 3rd Constitution Day parade, after which he left for Sopot, which belonged to the Free City of Danzig. After a dinner, he visits Danzig, noticing its empty port, as all sea transport was headed for Gdynia. After returning to Poland, Wańkowicz goes to Władysławowo, which was then called Wielka Wieś. A new fishing port was officially opened on May 6, 1938. Wańkowicz witnessed the ceremony, led by Bishop Stanisław Okoniewski: "Silent waters spread in front of our eyes. They are enclosed by two piers. The western one is 763 meters long, the eastern one is 320 meters long. The port has enough space for 100 fishing vessels". (pages 404–413)

- Dziura w stołku

This chapter begins with a reflection on the general condition of Poland in the late 1930s: "This nation grows by half a million a year, but we do not have space for such growth. One third of us, 10 million people, live their wretched existence on small farms, with the size not larger than one and a half hectare (...) One third of the nation rots physically and morally. They cannot afford education, food, new equipment. How can we go forward with all this?" (pages 419–421)

Wańkowicz mentions those Poles who travelled and succeeded abroad: Krzysztof Arciszewski (a vice-governor of Dutch Brazil), Maurycy Beniowski (ruler of a community in Madagascar), French Navy Captain Adam Mierosławski, Paweł Strzelecki (geologist and explorer), Ignacy Domeyko (geologist and educator, who spent most of his live in Chile), Bronisław Rymkiewicz (engineer, who built the Amazon river port at Manaus), Ernest Malinowski (who constructed a railway in the Peruvian Andes), Benedykt Dybowski (naturalist and physician), Mikołaj Przewalski (explorer of Central Asia), and many others. The author goes on to remind the readers that to cope with the problem of overpopulation, Poland needs colonies: "This nation wants to live and at the same time, it suffocates itself from population explosion (...) When other European nations conquered faraway lands, Poland protected the European – Asian borderline, fighting and bleeding along the boundary of two worlds. Then we lost independence, at a time when other European nations conquered most territory (...) Now, the wave of hungry nations is rising again, against those rich nations, which control world trade and which possess overseas empires. Forty per cent of our import is made of colonial goods, without which we cannot survive. Now, we understand why colonies are so important to Poland". (pages 422–430)

"We understand that it is a difficult task, but it also is a necessity, without which there is no development of Poland. We understand that nobody will give the colonies to us for free, that we are a poor nation, that other nations did not get their colonies for free, either. England fought many colonial wars, sending 20 million people abroad in the last 100 years. And we have people here, they are our treasure, but for now, they are our biggest misfortune. We should remember that everything depends on us, on our minds". (pages 430–432)

=== Nie mów COP – nim nie przeskoczysz ===
Between autumn of 1937, and autumn of 1938, Wańkowicz visited the Central Industrial Area (COP) five times. This chapter is dedicated to his last visit before publishing the book. It took place on November 16–19, 1938. Wańkowicz wants to silence those who criticize the very idea of the COP, by pointing out some numbers:

- natural gas consumption rose fifteen times in the period of four months, with 314 kilometers of a new pipeline, connecting 17 plants,
- 14 million zlotys were spent on road construction in 1938,
- ten new railroad stations were built,
- 22,000 hectares of land were improved,
- 280 kilometers of river banks were engineered,
- 10,000 new apartments were built.

During his November 1938 trip, Wańkowicz visited Dębica, where construction of the Stomil Tire Factory was started in April 1938: "Polish production now covers 70% of our demand. The import was reduced from 13 to 4 million (...) Soon, tires made of synthetic rubber will be manufactured here. The Dębica plant is like a laboratory, where white collar workers make one-third of staff". (pages 438–440) Then the author went by train to Pustków Osiedle near Dębica, where the Lignoza plastic and ammunition plant was under construction: "The spirit of explosives floats above this plant. So, its 135 buildings are scattered over the area of 600 hectares. And the settlement for the workers is located one kilometer away". (pages 440–441) Another location was Nowa Dęba, which Wańkowicz calls Dąb-Majdan: "Here, 2,360 people work. As early as autumn of 1939, first fuses will be manufactured at the 1,500 hectare plant. This giant factory is one large ammunition compound in case of war". (pages 442–443). Next location is Mielec, where on September 1, 1939, construction of PZL Mielec was started: "In the autumn of 1939, first 50,000-meter airframes will be tested here, in a special wind tunnel". (pages 444–445) Last stop of the trip was Stalowa Wola: "I walk along those giant furnaces and machines with mixed feelings. Deputy Prime Minister tells me that if both local blast furnaces were in use for 24 hours a day they would require as much as 12% of electric current, used by the whole Polish nation. It tells a lot about our country (...) Stalowa Wola has been under construction for 20 months, and 98% of buildings are ready. Whole plant will be up and running one year ahead of schedule". (pages 445–452)

=== Fanfara Zaolziańska ===
This whole chapter is dedicated to the events of autumn 1938, when following the Munich Agreement, Poland recovered Trans-Olza from Czechoslovakia. Wańkowicz personally visited this province, meeting with its residents.

- Czarne lata

The author goes back to the mid-19th century, when Polish national awakening was initiated in the Habsburg-ruled Duchy of Teschen. Wańkowicz recalls people responsible for it, local Polish activists, such as Jerzy Cienciała, Paweł Stalmach, Reverend Franciszek Michejda, Reverend Józef Londzin. At that time, Czech national movement was non-existent in the Duchy, and main enemy of Polish activists were Germans, who banned education in the Polish language, and until 1895, there was not a single Polish school in the Duchy. First Czech activists came here in the 1890s: "In 1918, after the dissolution of Austria-Hungary, Poles were first to act. On October 31, they established a local Polish government. The Czechs did not object, and on November 5, an agreement was signed, with Trans-Olza remaining in Polish hands (...) But soon afterwards, Poland became involved in other conflicts, and by early 1919, Czech envoy Karel Kramář, backed by Tomáš Masaryk, changed course, saying that Czechs were victors in the war, while the Fourteen Points were only a theory". (pages 460–463)

The Polish–Czechoslovak War began when on January 23, 1919, three trains with Czech infantry arrived at Ostrava. Polish forces were inadequate, as almost all local units of the Polish Army had been transported to Lwów on January 8 to fight in the Polish–Ukrainian War: "The Czechs stated that their infantry was heading for Slovakia, but on the next day they attacked, with 14,000 soldiers and 28 cannons. We had 1,285 soldiers, 4 cannons and 35 cavalrymen (...) After a week of fighting, the Czechs failed to achieve their objectives, while Poles received reinforcements. General Franciszek Latinik had 4,600 soldiers, which was fewer than the Czechs, but enough to stop the enemy's advance in the Battle of Skoczów (...) On January 30, 1919, Poles lost 19 dead, 82 wounded and 15 captured by the enemy; the Czechs massacred them with bayonets". (pages 463–467)

When in mid-1920 Soviet offensive against Poland began, the government of Czechoslovakia prohibited all transports of weapons, so needed by Poland. On July 28, 1920, the Conference of Ambassadors accepted the temporary demarcation line as a border between the two nations: "Our delegate, Ignacy Paderewski, while signing the decision of the Council, stated that Polish nation would never be convinced that it was a just decision, while Marshall Piłsudski told the Poles of Trans-Olza: Wait, be patient. We will never renounce you (...) As soon as Czechs took control of this land, they closed down 17 Polish schools with 4,135 students, expelling 100 Polish teachers (...) The Czechs did not exert direct pressure. Instead, they used the slogan: We have jobs only for our people. So, a Pole, sending his kids to Polish school, a Pole involved in Polish associations, lost his job (...) So local Poles decided to organize themselves. At Łazy I saw the main office of a Polish association of food producers. It has its own rail track, large car park, bakery, slaughterhouse, mill, lemonade plant, 120 stores spread across three counties". (pages 465–468)

- Oczekiwany dzień

Wańkowicz begins by recalling the Munich Agreement, in which German claims for Sudetenland were accepted, but there was no mention of either Polish or Hungarian claims to parts of Czechoslovakia. On the same day (Friday, September 30), a Polish aeroplane landed at Prague, with Polish claims. On the next day, the Czechs agreed to hand Trans-Olza over to Poland. Wańkowicz writes about it with enthusiasm: "Ours is Trans-Olza! Ours is Český Těšín, ours is Karviná, rich in coal! Ours is Lazy, with its main office of Polish association! Ours is Bohumín, the rail heart of Central Europe, the junction along the German-dreamed route from Berlin to Baghdad! Ours is industrial Frysztat, ours is the metallurgical colossus at Třinec! Ours is Jablunkov, the agricultural capital of Polish Trans-Olza! Ours is Konská, full of Polish activists! Ours is Darkov, with its spa, ours is old Bystřice! The Olza has turned into our internal river!" (page 473)

The author witnessed these events, giving a first-hand report. First he went to Skoczów, where headquarters of Independent Operational Group Silesia was located. He met General Władysław Bortnowski in his rail car, then went to a local restaurant to talk with Gustaw Morcinek. Next, he visited a camp in Hermanice, opened for Poles expelled by Czechs from Trans-Olza. On Monday, October 3, 1938, Wańkowicz came to Cieszyn, to witness a parade of the Polish Army. On the same night, a banquet took place at Polonia Hotel in Český Těšín. Next day, Wańkowicz went by car to Cierlicko, to see the spot where Polish aviators Stanisław Wigura and Franciszek Żwirko died in 1932. Next he visited Karwina and Orłowa, heading towards Ostrava, beyond new, extended borders of Poland: "Trees lie down by bridges, ready to barricade roads, red signs along roads mark mined areas. At Ostrava, a large and modern city, we eat dinner at a restaurant full of German speakers. Our driver suddenly comes to us, telling that Czech secret police are following us. So we hastily leave the restaurant". (pages 490–495)

- Światło

In 1914 in Trans-Olza, 24,000 children attended Polish schools, and only 2,320 pupils went to Czech schools. By 1938, these numbers changed, and the number of children in Polish schools shrank to 9,732. Before Polish Army units took control of this province, the retreating Czechs damaged schools, smashing furniture and stealing equipment. In late October 1938, Polish authorities began opening back schools in Trans-Olza. On October 26, middle schools at Jabłonków, Bogumin, Orłowa, and Cieszyn were opened after special ceremonies: "On my way back from Jabłonków, I stopped at Końska, visiting Agricultural High School (...) This school had been discriminated by the Czech authorities, who limited its funds to minimum (...) A few days after annexation of Trans-Olza, National Insurance invited 60 girls from Trzyniec, Karwina and Frysztat to a resort hotel in Jaworze. So, I am taking Gustaw Morcinek with me, and we are going there. At the resort, 60 local girls are waiting. The two groups immediately hit it off. This comes as no surprise. After all they are from the same land, which had been divided only 20 years before. (pages 504–508)

- Trud powszedni

Melchior Wańkowicz describes here efforts of Polish administration, which took control of Trans-Olza after its capture by the military: "Right after Polish soldiers, a train with Polish rail workers entered the area. Then there were trucks of Poczta Polska, delivery vehicles with produce (...) I went to Karwina after Sunday service. The locals were afraid that their Czech pensions would not be honored by the Polish government. Now they know they were wrong". (pages 510–514)

Trans-Olza was far more urbanized and industrialized than the Second Polish Republic. In the fall 1938, Poland captured 18 coal mines, which increased Polish coal production by 20%. As Wańkowicz wrote, main problem for Warsaw was to find new markets for the coal and coke from Trans-Olza. Furthermore, Trans-Olza had the enormous Třinec Iron and Steel Works, Albert Hahn Steel Plant at Bogumin, Wire Mill at Pudłów, Jeckel Pipe and Screw Plant at Frysztat: "Altogether, these plants manufacture 50% of Poland's output. Trans-Olza coke plants manufacture 40% of Poland's output. All these factories are awaiting new markets. Half of all houses here has electricity, 80% of Trans-Olza residents work in services and industry (...) Trans-Olza is a great challenge, an obstacle that we have to overcome (...) We already did not know what to do with our coal, and now our production has increased by one-fifth". (pages 516–527)

- Posłowie

The final chapter of the book is an afterword, in which the author recalls some events from Polish history, wishing that the Poland of the future would be based on two foundations, freedom and strength.

== Persons mentioned in the book ==
- Adamowicz brothers,
- General Władysław Bortnowski,
- Nikodem Caro,
- Hipolit Cegielski,
- Władysław Długosz of the National Oil Association of Poland,
- Jean Dybowski,
- Eugeniusz Kwiatkowski,
- General Franciszek Latinik,
- Franciszek Ksawery Drucki-Lubecki,
- Count Henryk Łubieński, businessman, entrepreneur,
- Ignacy Łukasiewicz,
- William H. McGarvey of Canadian Petroleum Hall of Fame,
- Władysław Michejda,
- Gustaw Morcinek,
- Bolesław Orliński,
- Jan Piłsudski (brother of Józef Piłsudski),
- Aleksander Prystor,
- General Wacław Scaevola-Wieczorkiewicz,
- Stanisław Staszic,
- Jan Stecki (first Minister of Internal Affairs of Poland),
- Piotr Steinkeller, pioneer of Polish industry,
- Stanisław Szczepanówski, pioneer of Polish oil industry,
- Edward Śmigły-Rydz,
- Antoni Tyzenhaus,
- Stanisław Wigura,
- Franciszek Żwirko.
