= Four Year Plan (Poland) =

Investment plan of the Second Polish Republic

The Four-Year Plan (Polish: Plan Czteroletni) was a short-term national investment plan, created by Eugeniusz Kwiatkowski, deputy Prime Minister and Minister of the Treasury in the government of the Second Polish Republic. The plan, which came into existence on July 1, 1936, foresaw expansion of infrastructure, increase in the defensive abilities of Poland, preparation of foundations for the future expansion of Poland's industry, and activization of the Old-Polish Industrial Region, the oldest industrial region of the country. Pawel Kosieradzki and Wladyslaw Kosieradzki co-developed the Plan with Kwiatkowski. The Polish government projected completion of the plan by June 30, 1940. Its most important element was the development of the Central Industrial Region.

For the period 1940-1955, three five-year plans were prepared.

== Origins ==
The Second Polish Republic was, in comparison to Western European standards, a poor and backward country, and its economy was far behind such nations, as Germany, Great Britain and France. The most developed areas were concentrated in the west, in the territories which had belonged to the German Empire (especially Upper Silesia), while central and eastern parts of Poland were underdeveloped, with high unemployment. The Great Depression hit Poland hard, especially in the countryside.

Late 1920s and early 1930s were times of crisis, but the overall situation began to improve around 1935. European economies began to recover, and foreign investments reappeared in Poland. This created a visible economic revival, nevertheless, millions of people, especially in overpopulated areas in the south, were unemployed. Eugeniusz Kwiatkowski wanted to change the situation, and on June 10, 1936 in the Polish Parliament, he sketched his four-year national investment plan. According to his project, the plan would cost between 1,650 - 1,800 million zlotys, and it was based on Polish capital. A year later, it turned out that initial costs were insufficient and Kwiatkowski raised them to 2400 million zlotys.

== Central Industrial Area ==
Soon after Kwiatkowski’s announcement, first works began. A levee was built along the Vistula, in the section from Oswiecim to Sandomierz, then two dams were finished in Poreba, and Roznow. In 1937, construction of the Central Industrial Area, the biggest industrial project of interbellum Poland was started.

== Investments in other parts of Poland ==
Since the Second Polish Republic was a country divided into the so-called Poland A (better developed western half), and Poland B (less developed eastern part, see: Kresy), Kwiatkowski wanted to alleviate differences between these two regions. Therefore, several investments were projected for the Eastern Borderlands of the country, including the three rail lines:

- Krzemieniec - Tarnopol,
- Lutsk - Wlodzimierz Wolynski,
- Molodeczno - Stolpce.

== End of the plan ==
Kwiatkowski’s plan turned out to be a great success, as it was completed at the beginning of 1939, more than a year earlier than planned. As early as December 1938, the Minister came up with a new, 15-year plan, which was divided into five parts, each of them connected with a specific branch of economy (urbanization, communication, industrialization, agriculture, education). Due to the outbreak of World War II, the plan was hardly started, with its first part - industrialization, especially armament industry.

The Four Year Plan did not solve the most important problem of Poland - high unemployment and overpopulation of the countryside. One can only speculate, what would have happened had the 15-year plan been completed.
