= Lake Rożnów =

Jezioro Rożnowskie Lake Rożnow
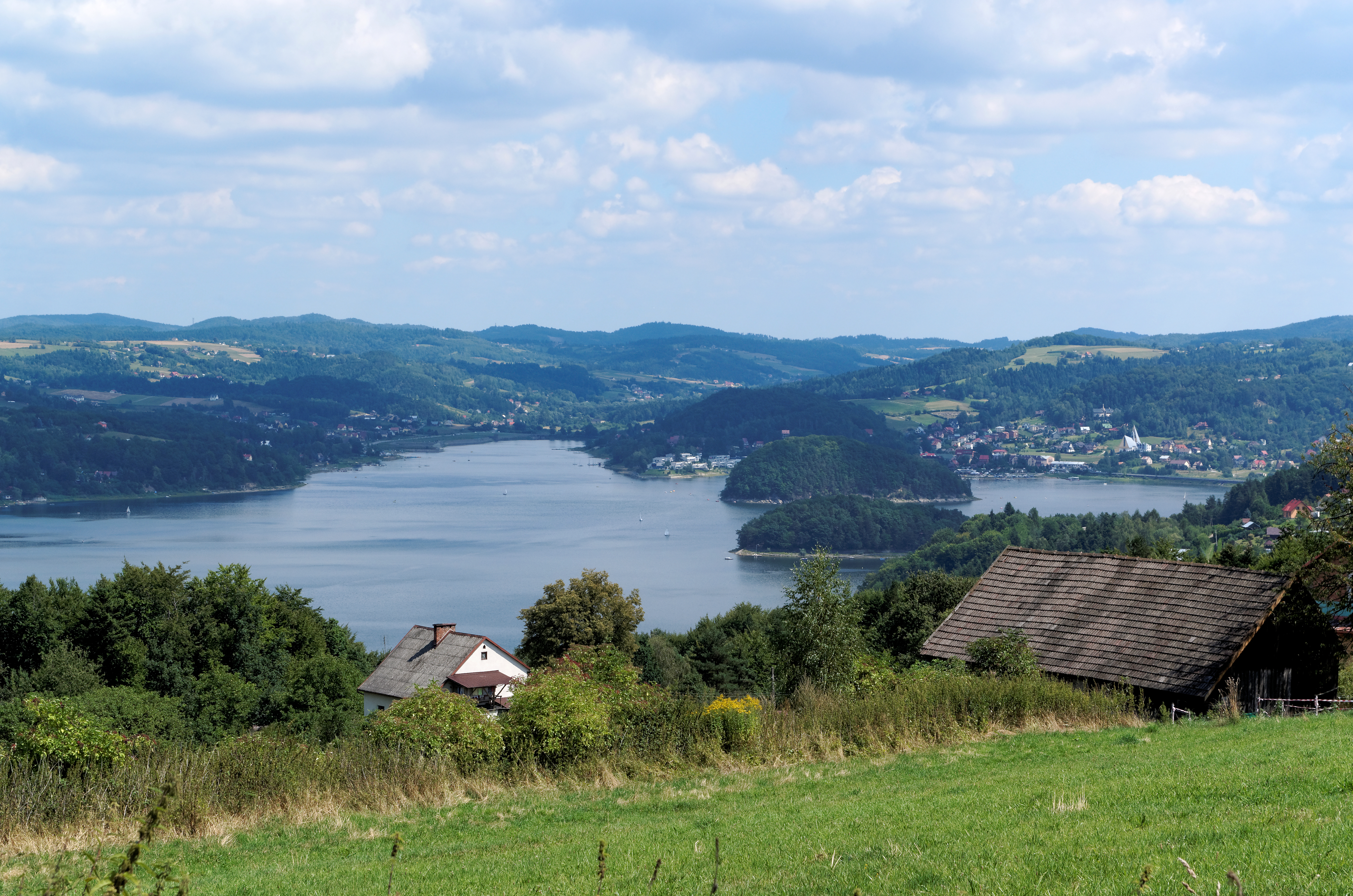
- Lake Rożnow

- Location within Lesser Poland Voivodeship
- Location: Island Beskids
- Coordinates: 49°43′56″N 20°42′52″E
- Type: Artificial lake
- Primary inflows: Dunajec River
- Primary outflows: Dunajec River
- Basin countries: Poland
- Max. length: 18 to 20 km (11 to 12 mi)
- Max. width: 1 to 2 km (0.62 to 1.24 mi)
- Surface area: 16 to 20 km^{2} (6.2 to 7.7 sq mi)
- Max. depth: 30 m (98 ft)
- Islands: Monkey Island
- Settlements: Tegoborze, Znamirowice, Zbyszyce, Bartkowa, Grodek nad Dunajcem, Tabaszowa, Rożnow

Lake Rożnow (Polish: Jezioro Rożnowskie) is an artificial lake, built in 1935–1941. It is located in southernmost part of Poland (Lesser Poland Voivodeship). The lake was built in the interwar period to regulate the Dunajec river flowing through the foothills of Beskid Mountains; and also, to provide electricity for the Rożnow Power Plant (Elektrownia Rożnow) built into the dam. The lake took two years to fill which took place during World War II, from mid 1941 until 1943. It was named after the village of Rożnow.

== History ==
Lake Rożnow was created not long before the invasion of Poland, after a dam had been built on the 80th kilometre distance of the Dunajec river. It lies among the hills of the Island Beskids, in Nowy Sącz County, some 12 kilometers north of Nowy Sącz. The valley of the Dunajec narrows here, turning into a canyon. The lake has the shape of an irregular letter S, with length ranging from 18 to 20 kilometres, and width of 1 app. kilometre (in few spots, it widens to no more than 2 kilometres). The depth of the reservoir reaches up to 30 metres near the dam. The total area of Rożnow Lake ranges from 16 to 20 square kilometres. The shoreline is marked by numerous peninsulas and bays, located at the mouths of several smaller rivers, which flow into the Dunajec. The lake is surrounded by forested hills, and its picturesque location makes it a very popular tourist center. Several tourist villagers are located along Lake Rożnow: Tegoborze, Znamirowice, Zbyszyce, Bartkowa, Grodek nad Dunajcem, Tabaszowa, Rożnow.

Lake Rożnow has a small island, called Malpia Wyspa (Monkey Island). It used to be a hill with an ancient gord, which was turned into an island in 1942, after the Dunajec valley had been flooded. Currently, Monkey Island serves as a bird reserve, with as many 165 bird species living here.

The idea of construction of a dam on the Dunajec river in Rożnow was born after the disastrous 1934 flood in Poland. Due to lack of funds, the project was postponed until 1937, when first land purchases were made. The dam was built by a Polish-French company, which constructed a special settlement for the workers and engineers (the so-called French Colony), together with narrow gauge rail line to a stone quarry at Marcinkowice. Construction was interrupted after the Invasion of Poland, but as early as November 1939, German authorities of the General Government decided to continue it, using Polish plans. The dam together with the power plant was completed in 1942. It is built from concrete, with the height of 44 meters, and the length of 550 meters.
