= OPV =

OPV may refer to:

- Offshore patrol vessel
- Optionally piloted vehicle, a hybrid between a conventional aircraft and an unmanned aerial vehicle (UAV)
- Oral polio vaccine, usually the Sabin preparation
- Original promotional videos (or sometimes other people's videos), unofficial music videos usually produced by anonymous fans, using the official audio version of a song but substituting alternative video footage
- Organic photovoltaic
- Om Prakash Valmiki, Dalit writer and poet. His autobiography, Joothan, is a well known work in Dalit literature
- OPV Nemesis, an Offshore Patrol Vessel of the New South Wales Police Force
- Old Poland Voivodeship
- Old Providence vireo (Vireo crassirostris), a bird of the West Indies
- Om Prakash Verma
- Omer Pashë Vrioni
- Omicron Persei VIII
- Operation Polar Valor
- Operation Police Victory
- Optional preferential voting, a system of vote-casting used in New South Wales and the Northern Territory in the Commonwealth of Australia
- OPV AIDS hypothesis, an alternative theory regarding the origin of the AIDS virus
