= Central Industrial Region =

Central Industrial Region may refer to:

- Central Industrial Region (Poland)
- Central Industrial Oblast, Russia
