= Dobczyce Castle =

Coordinates: 49°52′36″N 20°05′06″E

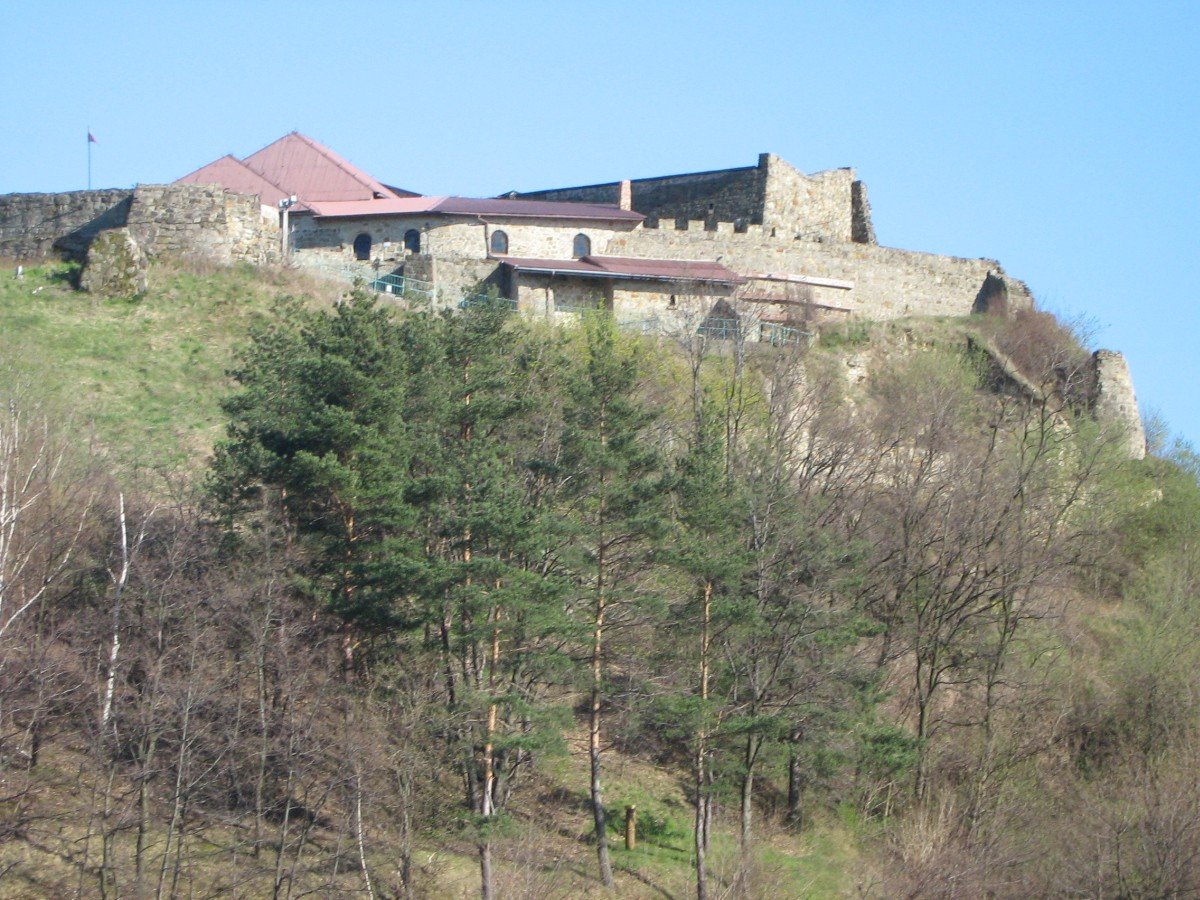
Dobczyce Castle

Dobczyce Castle (Polish: Zamek w Dobczycach) is a castle in Dobczyce, Lesser Poland Voivodeship, in southern Poland. It is located on a rocky hill above Lake Dobczyce. The castle was first mentioned in written sources in 1362, but had been fortified since 1311. In the time of Casimir III the Great, the walls were from 5 to 9 meters thick, and the castle was a fortified stronghold. In 1398, the castle was the abode of King Władysław II Jagiełło and his wife Jadwiga. In 1473, for several months, Prince Casimir stayed here after returning from an unsuccessful expedition. The Lubomirski family, who ruled the castle from 1585, rebuilt the Gothic fortress into a Renaissance residence in the years 1593–1594. The clocktower, chapel and fountain were added. By 1620 the castle had 70 rooms and 3 towers. In the 1960s the site was extensively excavated.

== See also ==
- Castles in Poland
