= Central Industrial Region (Poland) =

Polish economic project

The Central Industrial District (Polish: Centralny Okręg Przemysłowy, abbreviated COP), is an industrial region in Poland. It was one of the biggest economic projects of the Second Polish Republic. The 5-year-long project was initiated by a famous Polish economist, deputy Prime Minister and Minister of the Treasury, Eugeniusz Kwiatkowski. Its goal was to create a heavy industrial center in the middle of the country, as far as possible from any borders, strengthen the Polish economy and reduce unemployment. The four-year plan for the development of COP was scheduled from 1 September 1936 until 30 July 1940 and was interrupted by the outbreak of the Second World War and the German invasion of Poland on 1 September 1939. Nonetheless, the COP project succeeded in vastly expanding Polish industry, and after the end of the war in 1945 COP was rebuilt and expanded under the People's Republic of Poland.

== History ==
Starting in 1928, there were recurring attempts to create a triangle of security, an industrial region in the middle of the country, which would be secure from any aggression by Germany or the Soviet Union. The plan was finally approved in 1936 by the Polish government. By April 1938, the plan, which had already set in motion in some parts of the country, was expanded to the territories beyond those covered by the original plan for the most secure 'triangle'.

Polish voivodeships 1922–1939, colored ones were involved in the COP plan.

The COP was located in the territories of the following former voivodeships: the eastern parts of Kielce Voivodship and Kraków Voivodship, the southern part of Lublin Voivodeship, and the western part of Lwów Voivodeship, or in other terms, 46 powiats, constituting 15.4% of the territory of Poland and inhabited by 17% of Poland's population. The urbanization factor of those territories was 17% (94 cities), compared to the national average of 30%. There were several arguments for the location of the COP:

- Military: a relatively long distance from both the western and eastern borders (Poland was expecting future German or Soviet aggression) as well as protection from the south by the Carpathian Mountains.
- Demographic: a fairly high population density (100 people/km^{2}) with high unemployment (400,000-700,000).
- Economic: to strengthen the mostly agricultural market of eastern Poland and create a market for Western Poland's industrial products as well as an energy market for southern Poland. In addition, the region had some undeveloped natural resources (stone, iron, clay and some energy resources).
- Social: to reduce unemployment, still high in the mostly-agricultural regions of Eastern Poland, which were still feeling the aftershocks of the Great Depression.

The COP plan required a massive financial investment, just the development of the infrastructure and the military industry being estimated at 3 billion zlotys. As expectations of war grew, there was too little private investment in Europe in the late 1930s and so the Polish government carried most of the burden for financing the project. From 1937 to 1939, the COP had consumed approximately 60% of all Polish investment funds.

== Achievements ==
The following industrial projects were part of the plan: a steel mill (Huta Stalowa Wola) and power plant in a brand new city of Stalowa Wola, a rubber factory in Dębica, a truck factory in Lublin by Lilpop, Rau i Loewenstein, the aircraft factory PZL-Mielec in Mielec, the aircraft engine and artillery factory PZL-Rzeszów in Rzeszów, hydroelectric power plants in Rożnów and Myczkowce, and the expansion of Zakłady Azotowe in Mościce. The military industry in the Staropolski Okręg Przemysłowy was expanded in the towns of Radom, Skarżysko-Kamienna, Ostrowiec Świętokrzyski, Starachowice, and Kielce. Most of those investments were located in regions with high unemployment, and their construction succeeded in reducing social tensions and began to strengthen the Polish economy.

The development of the COP and similar projects, like the construction of the seaport in Gdynia, were the most outstanding achievements of the Second Polish Republic, marking the beginning of the new era of recently regained independence. The COP plan was continued by the communist government of Poland after the Second World War.

However, as the end date for the plan was the end of July 1940, and Poland did not have sufficient capital to carry out the entire plan on its own, few of the intended projects were completely operational before the war broke out, and many other ones were not launched at all. Consequently, their contribution to the equipment of the Polish Army in the run-up to the war was relatively insignificant, and did little to offset the crushing material superiority of the German armed forces.

German encirclement and annihilation tactics in the Second World War, with their rapid advances by extremely well-equipped infantry (better than even their British and French counterparts) and fast motorized forces (heavy losses suffered by Panzer divisions were one of the reasons, the Germans created, what became known after World War II was over, as blitzkrieg tactics) and long-range air attacks, ensured that the COP region apparently failed to provide a secure haven for Polish industry. The idea of the safe triangle came from the thinking of the Polish military strategists during World War I and the Polish-Soviet War in 1919–1920. This idea was upgraded during the late 1930s and many of the factories crucial to the war effort got distributed across the country. Moreover, the PZL.37 Łoś, a medium bomber, the factory was successfully moved and reassembled in the easternmost Poland that fell to the Soviet advance after September 17, 1939.

In any event, the German dismemberment of Czechoslovakia outflanked Poland from the south and put the majority of COP factories in the direct path of German advance from Slovakia. During the German occupation, most of the factories were converted to contribute to the German war effort. After the war, the COP-initiated industrial enterprises were further expanded and for the most part, continue to function until today.

Melchior Wańkowicz, in his 1939 book Sztafeta, emphasized the fact that the quick growth of the COP's towns and cities was not followed by necessary investments in infrastructure, especially schools and housing. As Ilustrowany Kurier Codzienny announced on January 10, 1939, in the first half of 1938, the population of Rzeszów grew by 24%, that of Sandomierz by 29%, Tarnobrzeg by 49%, and Mielec by 58%. Altogether, in the first half of 1938, the total population of all the COP's towns and cities grew by 20%. According to a press release from January 1939, out of 33 towns and cities located at the confluence of the San and the Vistula rivers, as many as 23 needed new schools.

== See also ==
- Sandomierz Voivodeship (1939)
- Upper Silesian Industry Area
- Gdynia
- Polish Coal Trunk-Line
- Sztafeta
