= Lake Dobczyce =

Jezioro Dobczyckie Lake Dobczyce
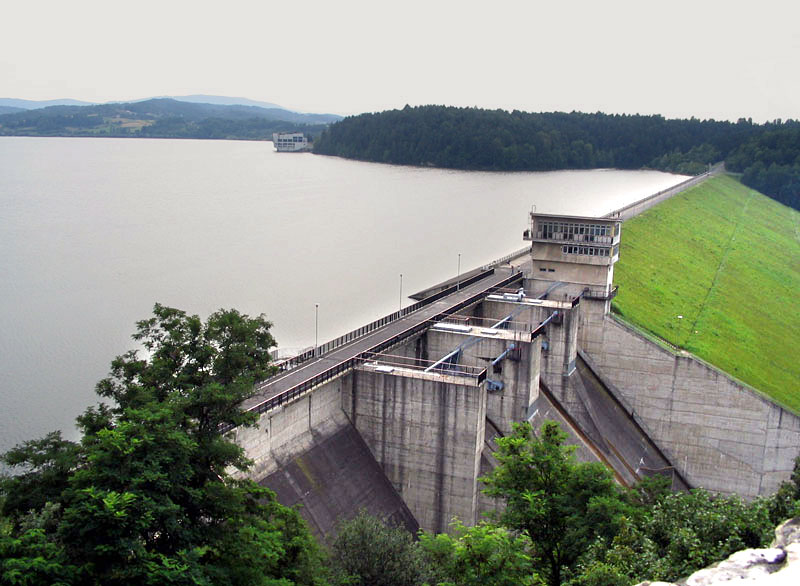
- View of Lake Dobczyce together with the dam

- Location within Lesser Poland Voivodeship
- Location: Lesser Poland Voivodeship
- Coordinates: 49°52′12″N 20°03′25″E
- Type: Artificial lake
- Primary inflows: Raba River
- Primary outflows: Raba River
- Basin countries: Poland
- Max. length: 8 km (5.0 mi)
- Max. width: 1 km (0.62 mi)
- Surface area: 10.65 km^{2} (4.11 sq mi)
- Average depth: 11 m (36 ft)
- Max. depth: 28 m (92 ft)
- Settlements: Dobczyce, Myślenice

Lake Dobczyce (Polish: Jezioro Dobczyckie) is an artificial lake, built in 1985 - 1987. It is located in southern Poland (Lesser Poland Voivodeship), thirty kilometers south of Kraków. The lake, which lies between the Island Beskids, and the Wieliczka Foothills, was built to regulate the Raba river between the towns of Dobczyce and Myślenice. The Raba river dam has the length of 617 meters, and the height of 30 meters.

The decision to build the dam and the lake was taken in 1970. In the following years, 70 hectares of forest were cut down, and villages, schools, plants and cemeteries were moved from the valley. With the completion of the dam and the lake, the problem of frequent flooding of the Raba valley was solved. Lake Dobczyce provides water for the city of Kraków, it also has a hydroelectric power plant. Due to a picturesque location, the lake is very popular among residents of the city, who take advantage of walking and bicycle trails. Furthermore, it is a nesting place for several species of aquatic birds.

The Dobczyce Castle is located on a rocky hill above Lake Dobczyce since 1311.

== Sources ==
- Myślenice County portal
