= List of proposed voivodeships of Poland =

The list of proposed voivodeships (provinces) of Poland. In Polish politics, a possible future voivodeship is referred to as 17th voivodeship (Polish: 17. województwo), in regard to 16 currently existing voivodeships.

== Proposed voivodeships ==
- Częstochowa Voivodeship (also known as the Jurassic Voivodeship), a voivodeship in the South-East part of the country, proposed to be created out parts of Świętokrzyskie, Łódź, and Silesian Voivodeships. Częstochowa is proposed to be its capital.
- Middle Poland Voivodeship (also known as the Eastern Greater Poland Voivodeship), a voivodeship in the Central-East part of the country, proposed to be created out parts of Greater Poland and Łódź Voivodeships. Kalisz is proposed to be the capital.
- Middle Pomeranian Voivodeship, a voivodeship in North West part of the country, proposed to be created out of parts of West Pomeranian, Pomeranian, Greater Poland Voivodeships, with borders similar to former Koszalin Voivodeship, that existed from 1950 to 1975. Koszalin is proposed to be the seat of the marchal of voivodeship, and Słupsk to be the seat of the voivodeship sejmik.
- Old Poland Voivodeship, a voivodeship proposed during the works on the 1999 Poland Administrative Division Reform, that haven't been included in the final version. It was planned to be in place of the Świętokrzyskie Voivodeship, and parts of Łódź, and Silesian Voivodeships. Częstochowa was proposed to the seat of voivode, and Kielce to be the seat of the voivodeship sejmik.
- Warsaw Voivodeship (also known as Warsaw), a voivodeship the Central-East part of the country, proposed to be formed from the Polish capital city of Warsaw in Masovian Voivodeship, and possibly, the surrounding counties. Warsaw is proposed to be its capital.

== Historical propositions ==
- Sandomierz Voivodeship, a proposed voivodeship of the Second Polish Republic, planned to be created in 1939. Its creation was stopped by the World War II and German occupation of Poland.

== Other propositions and term usage ==
=== Electoral district ===
In 2008, Helsinki Foundation for Human Rights proposed the creation of an overseas electoral district for Polish citizens voting from abroad. The mandate was referred to as the Abroad district (Polish: Okręg Zagranica) and, the 17th voivodeship (Polish: 17. województwo). It was planned to have its own representation in the Parliament of Poland, to represent the interest of the Polish citizens that live abroad. An additional reason for its creation was that, at the time, the votes from abroad, were counted as given in Warsaw I electoral district, which consists of Warsaw, the capital city of Poland, which resulted in untruthful statistical data.

=== Iraq ===
Polish zone in Iraq that existed from 2003 to 2008, during the Iraq War was sometimes colloquially referred to in media as the Iraqi Voivodeship (Polish: województwo irackie) and the 17th voivodeship (Polish: 17. województwo).
