= Sandomierz Voivodeship (1939) =

Proposed voivodeship of the Second Polish Republic

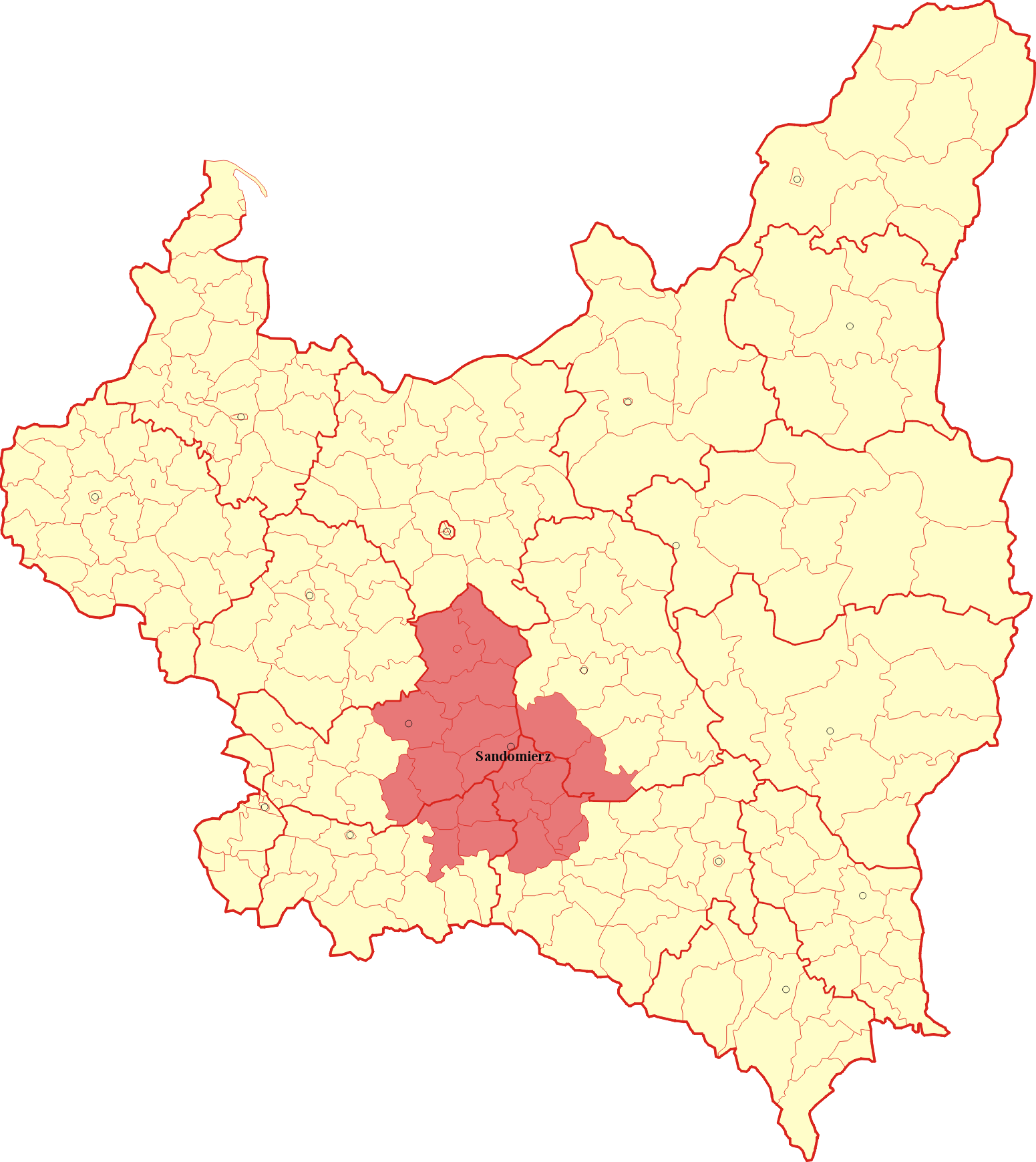
Probable territory of the Sandomierz Voivodeship of the Second Polish Republic

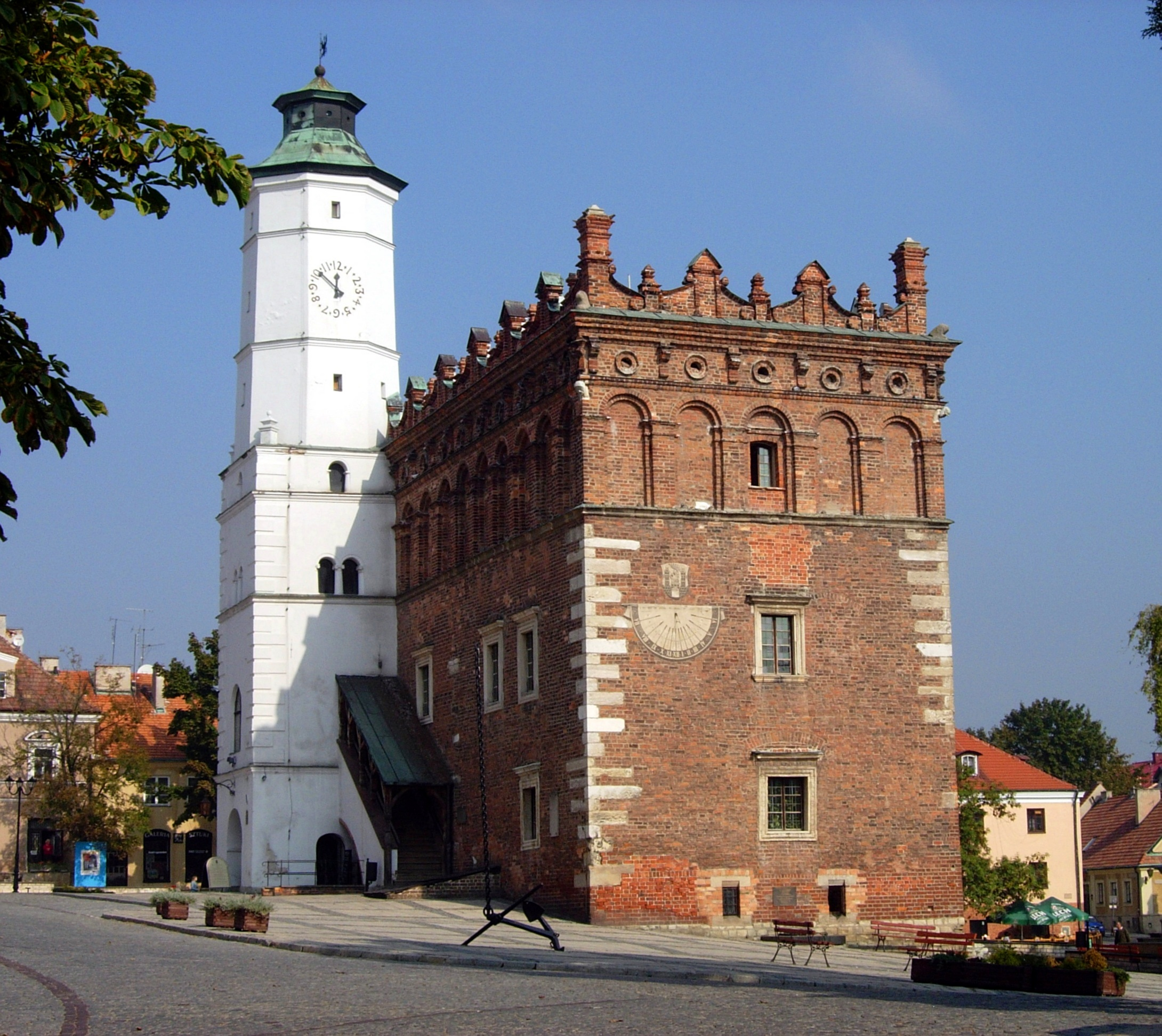
Historic Town Hall in Sandomierz

Sandomierz Voivodeship (Polish: wojewodztwo sandomierskie) was a proposed voivodeship of the Second Polish Republic, which was never created because of the Nazi and Soviet invasion of Poland in September 1939. The idea of the creation of this unit was the brainchild of the Minister of Industry and Trade Eugeniusz Kwiatkowski, and it was directly linked with creation of one of the biggest economic projects of interbellum Poland, Central Industrial Region. It was intended to cover south-central Poland and be created in late 1939. Its projected size was 24,500 square kilometers, and it was to incorporate 20 or 21 powiats.

== Origins ==
The historic Polish city of Sandomierz was one of the major urban centers of the Kingdom of Poland, and later the Polish–Lithuanian Commonwealth. The capital of a large Sandomierz Voivodeship, Sandomierz’s importance declined after the Partitions of Poland. In the 19th century it turned into a little town, located right on the border between Austria-Hungary, and the Russian Empire.

After World War I, when Poland regained its independence, Sandomierz remained a historically important but economically non-existent location on the map of the newly restored country. The war destroyed a large part of the city, and its population decreased to some 6,000. Sandomierz, located in the Kielce Voivodeship was the capital of a county, but it was not among eight biggest municipalities of the Kielce Voivodeship.

The situation began to change in 1937 after Minister Eugeniusz Kwiatkowski publicly stated on February 5: “...today, we are declaring a new slogan in the program of industrialization, which will be granted a symbolic and shortened name: Central Area - Sandomierz...”. According to other sources, Kwiatkowski announced Sandomierz as capital of the Central Industrial Region as early as 1935.

Sandomierz was by no means the biggest city on the area of the Central Industrial Region. Far larger were such cities, as Lublin, Rzeszów, Kielce and Radom, but Sandomierz was located right in the middle of the region, besides, Kielce and Lublin had already been capitals of the voivodeships (see: Kielce Voivodeship, Lublin Voivodeship). The town was conveniently located along the Vistula, and at the junction of rail lines to Skarżysko-Kamienna, Lwów, and Dębica. The nearby junction of Rozwadów provided a connection to Lublin; furthermore, the Polish government planned construction of the Upper Silesia - Sandomierz - Volhynia line.

== Sandomierz as the capital of the new voivodeship ==
Creation of the Central Industrial Region and plans for the new voivodeship were warmly welcomed in Sandomierz. Predicting quick development and growth of the town, local government began several projects, including construction of office blocks, several roads, and new districts. All was overseen by a famous architect, Jan Zachwatowicz of the Warsaw University of Technology.

The plan of the so-called Greater Sandomierz predicted that in a few years, population of the city was to grow to 120 000, and its size to 2600 hectares. On June 6, 1939, a meeting of local politicians and architects of the Warsaw University of Technology took place. They discussed plan of construction of the new, upscale district, with a spacious house of culture, theater, market halls, condominiums and green areas. Also, a city college was to be opened.

== The voivodeship ==
The Sandomierz Voivodeship, which was to be created in late 1939, was to cover 20 or 21 counties of the four existing voivodeships. Its total area was to be 24,500 square kilometers. Other project stipulated that the new Voivodeship would cover whole area of the Central Industrial Region, thus its size would be 59.951 square kilometers, with 46 counties. Eugeniusz Kwiatkowski offered the post of the voivode to mayor of Warsaw, Stefan Starzyński.

Most probably, the voivodeship would be reduced to the 20 or 21 counties of the four already existing voivodeships. Out of the Kielce Voivodeship, the following eight counties would be transferred:

- Sandomierz county,
- Opatów county,
- Stopnica county,
- Radom county,
- Kielce county,
- Kozienice county,
- Wierzbnik county,
- Pińczów county.

Lublin Voivodeship would transfer two counties:

- Janów Lubelski county,
- Biłgoraj county,

Kraków Voivodeship would transfer four counties:

- Mielec county,
- Dębica county,
- Dąbrowa Tarnowska county,
- Tarnów county,

Lwów Voivodeship would transfer six or seven counties:

- Tarnobrzeg county,
- Nisko county,
- Kolbuszowa county,
- Rzeszów county,
- Łańcut county,
- Przeworsk county,
- Strzyżów county.

On September 1, 1939, Nazi Germany attacked Poland. On September 17, the Soviet Union also invaded. The Second Polish Republic ceased to exist and consequently, the Sandomierz Voivodeship was never created.

== See also ==
- Administrative division of Second Polish Republic
- List of proposed voivodeships of Poland
