= Raba (Vistula) =

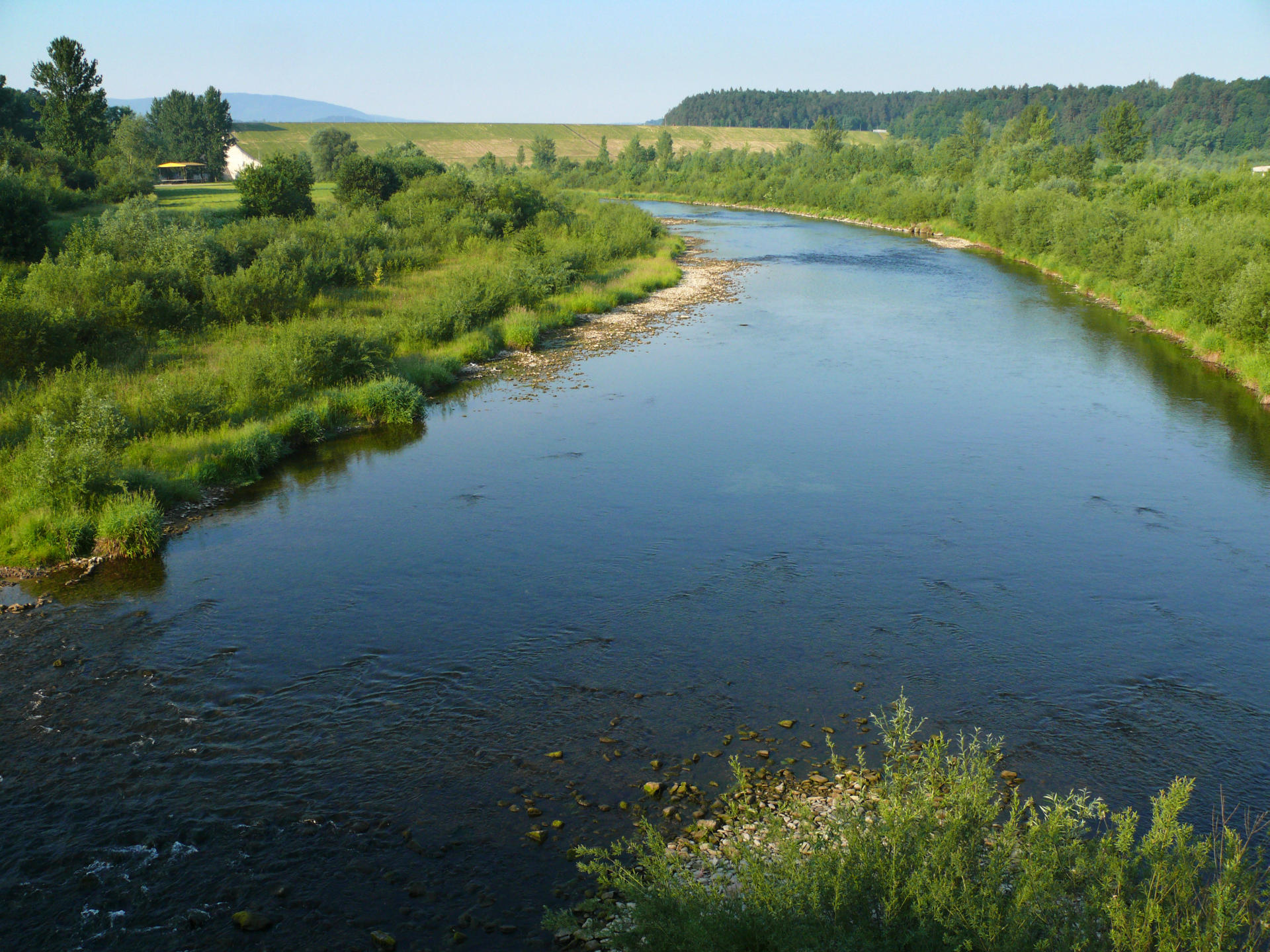
- The Raba near Dobczyce

Location
- Country: Poland

Physical characteristics
- Mouth
  - location: Vistula
  - coordinates: 50.1375°N 20.5092°E
- Length: 134.7 km (83.7 mi)
- Basin size: 1,537.1 km^{2} (593.5 sq mi)

Basin features
- Progression: Vistula→ Baltic Sea

The Raba is a river in the south of Poland (Lesser Poland Voivodeship), and a right-bank tributary of Vistula River. Its source is in the Beskids, between the towns of Rabka-Zdrój and Nowy Targ. It flows to the north and then to the northeast. Towns along the river Raba include Rabka-Zdrój, Mszana Dolna, Myślenice, Dobczyce and Bochnia.

For centuries, the Raba was an important artery, along which several towns and villages were established. Its name probably comes from Celtic languages, and the Raba is divided into three parts: the Upper Raba (60 kilometres [37 mi] long located in the Beskids), the Middle Raba (in the Carpathian Foothills), and the Lower Raba (in the Sandomierz Basin).

The Raba has its source at the Sieniawa mountain pass, at the height of 750 metres (2,460 ft) above sea level. It flows into the Vistula near Uście Solne, after 134.7 kilometres (83.7 mi), while the area of its drainage basin is 1,537.1 square kilometres (593.5 sq mi). From its source downstream to the town of Myślenice, the Raba is a typical mountain river, with narrow valley, rock-covered bed, fast currents and big drops. Below Lake Dobczyce it retains its mountain features for several kilometers. The river has no tributaries for its last 19 kilometres (12 mi).

The Raba marks the boundary between the Makow Beskids and the Island Beskids, as well as the boundary between the Wieliczka Foothills, and the Wiśnicz Foothills. Its tributaries are mainly mountain streams, such as Poniczanka, Slonka, Krzyworzeka, Mszanka, Kasinianka, Kaczanka, Krzczonówka, Trzemesnianka, Stradomka, Babica.

== See also ==
- Rivers of Poland
- 1934 flood in Poland

== Sources ==
- Description of the Raba
