= Gustaw Morcinek =

Silesian writer (1891–1963)

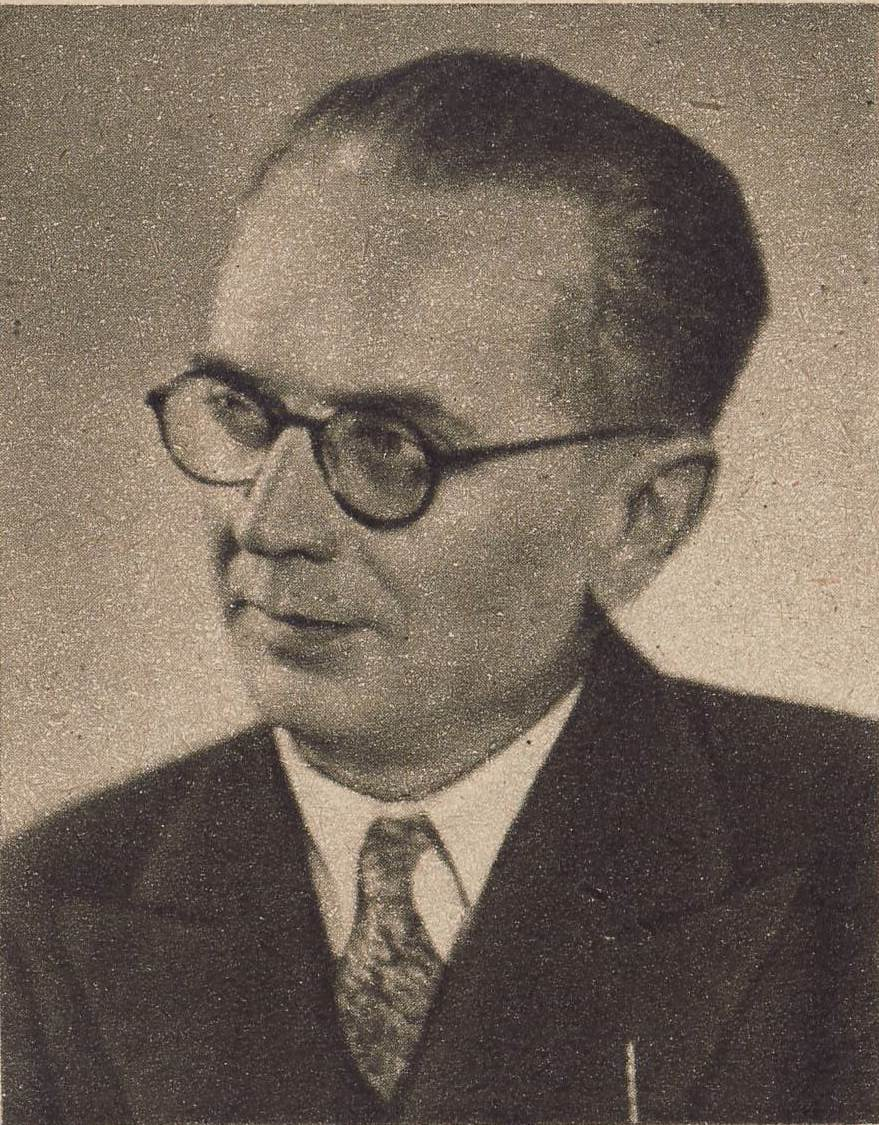
- Portrait of Morcinek, 1947
- Born: Augustyn Morcinek; 25 August 1891; Karviná, Austria-Hungary
- Died: 20 December 1963 (aged 72); Kraków, Poland
- Resting place: Cieszyn
- Citizenship: Austrian, Polish
- Occupations: Writer and educator
- Writing career
- Language: Polish
- Notable work: Wyrąbany chodnik
- Political party: Alliance of Democrats

Gustaw Morcinek (born Augustyn Morcinek; 25 August 1891 – 20 December 1963) was a Polish writer, educator and later member of Sejm from 1952 to 1957. He is considered one of the most important writers from Silesia.

== Biography ==
In 1891, Morcinek was born in Karviná into a poor family, the youngest of four siblings. In 1892, his father Józef died and his mother was forced to provide for the family. Morcinek started work in the coal mine at the age of 16, which was quite late compared to the standard of those times. When he was 19, miners raised money for his education and he began attending a teachers' seminary in Biała Krakowska, from which he graduated in 1914. In 1914 he was drafted into the Austro-Hungarian Army and after 1918 served briefly in the Polish Army. In 1920, when Cieszyn Silesia was divided between Poland and Czechoslovakia, his hometown Karviná fell to the latter. Morcinek was a pro-Polish activist and thus decided to stay in Poland. In the 1920s and 1930s he worked as a teacher in Skoczów.

=== Interwar period ===
During the interwar period, Morcinek published many articles in the Silesian press. He wrote his most important books in the late 1920s and early 1930s becoming the only notable Silesian Polish-language prosaist of the interwar period. His works concentrate mostly on coal mining and Silesian themes. Morcinek showed miners' work and life in a realistic way and accentuates the class character of national oppression of Polish miners. Morcinek spent the years 1936-1939 abroad, in Western Europe.

=== World War II ===
Morcinek returned to Poland shortly before the outbreak of World War II. Morcinek was arrested by the Gestapo on 6 September 1939. He was initially imprisoned with Władysław Dworaczek and other Polish intellectuals from Silesia. Gustaw spent the entire war in the Nazi concentration camps of Skrochovice, Sachsenhausen and Dachau. The supposed reason given for his arrest was his "anti-German activity" before the war and the fact that a dog in one of his novels (Wyrąbany chodnik) was named Bismarck. When Morcinek was in concentration camps, he was given a choice to sign a Volksliste but refused. (Note: A Volksliste was a document introduced by the Nazi authorities; a non-German citizen declared that he had some German ancestry by signing it. Refusal to sign this document could lead to deportation to a concentration camp. Non-German citizens from territories belonging to Nazi Germany were forced to sign it.)

=== After the war ===
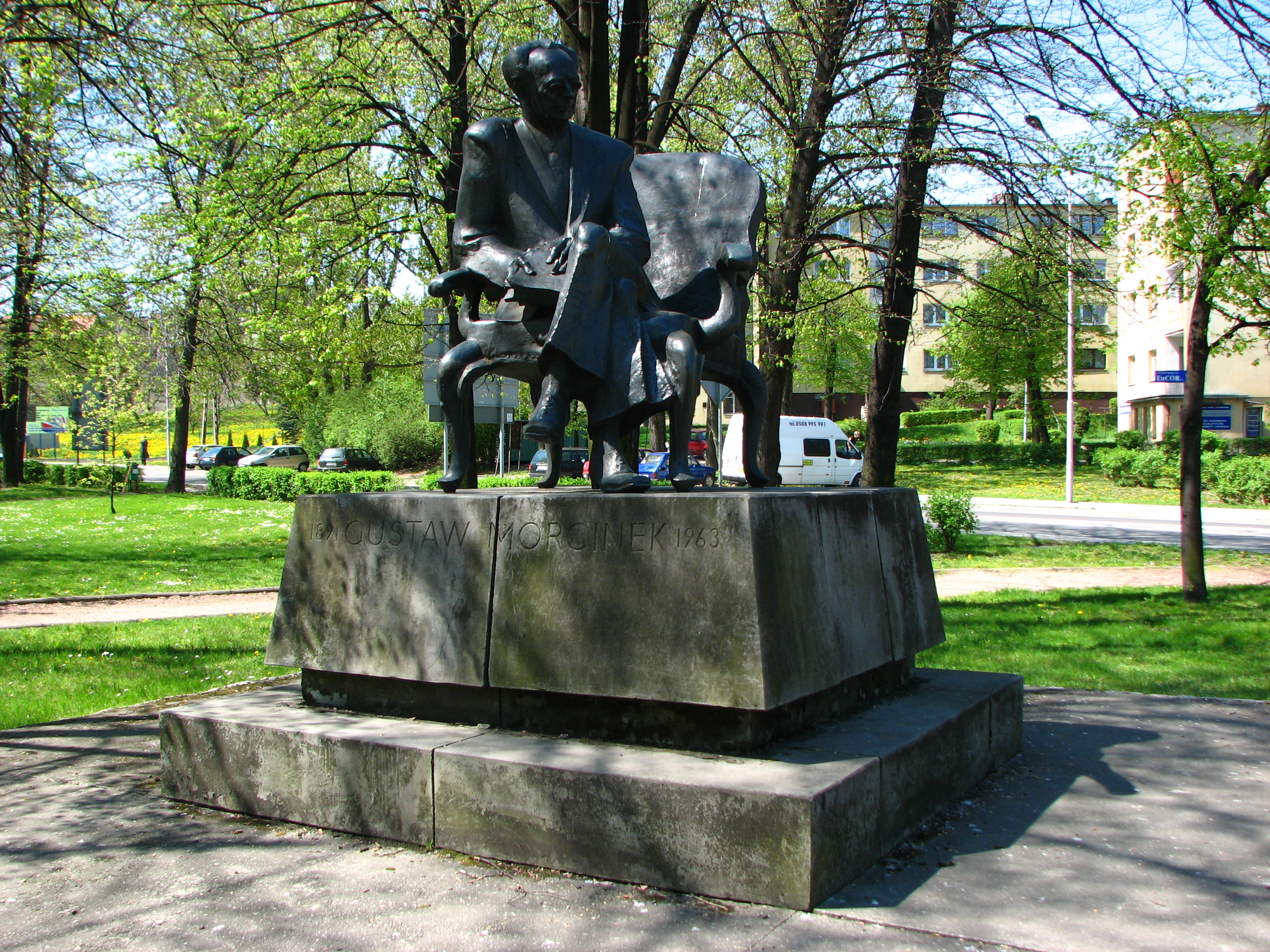
Monument to Gustaw Morcinek in Skoczów

From his release until November 1946, Morcinek resided in France, Italy and Belgium and cooperated with the Polish émigré press there. He then returned to Silesia, Poland, and settled in Katowice. He was then actively supported by the new authorities. Morcinek resumed his writing and continued to concentrate on Silesian issues, but widened his scope to books for children and also epistolography. He received wide recognition and literary awards for his work and many of his books were translated and published abroad. Morcinek died of leukemia on 20 December 1963 in Kraków and was later buried at Communal Cemetery in Cieszyn.

== Political activity ==
Morcinek was politically active from a young age. He was an active advocate of joining the entirety of Cieszyn Silesia to Poland. During the interwar period, when he was an anti-German activist, some critics accused him of spreading hatred. After the war, he was a supporter of Polish United Workers' Party and was a member of the Sejm for the Katowice electoral district (1952–1957). On 27 April 1953, Morcinek put a motion to the Sejm approving a decree to change the name of Katowice to Stalinogród. Although his motion was largely symbolic, as the name change had already taken place the previous month, he was socially ostracised as a result.

== Works ==
=== Novellas and novellas collections ===
- Noc listopadowa (1927)
- W kwietniową noc (1928)
- Zgaszony płomyk (1928)
- O te świętą ziemeczkę (1929)
- Serce za tamą (1929)
- Cisza (1930)
- Miód w sercu (1930)
- Chleb na kamieniu (1931)
- Na bieda-szybie (1932)
- Sześć dni (1932)
- Dzieje węgla (1933)
- Kataryniarz (1933)
- W zadymionym słońcu (1933)
- Uśmiech na drodze (1935)
- Gołębie na dachu (1936)
- Po kamienistej drodze (1936)
- W najmłodszym lesie (1937)
- Maszerowa (1938)
- Miasteczko nad rzeką (1938)
- Królewski dług (1939)

=== Short story collections ===
- Byli dwaj bracia (1930)
- Wyrąbany chodnik (1931–32)
- Inżynier Szeruda (1937)
- Wyorane kamienie (1939)
- Dziewczyna z Pól Elizejskich (1946)
- Listy z mojego Rzymu (1946)
- Wróżbita (1946)
- Dwie korony (1948)
- Zagubione klucze (1948)
- Pod gongiem (1949)
- Pokład Joanny (1951)
- W Nysie na rynku (1952)
- Odkryte skarby (1953)
- Ondraszek (1953)
- W Wiergulowej dziedzinie (1953)
- Viktoria (1954)
- Wskrzeszenie Herminy (1956)
- Z mojej ziemi (publicystyka) (1956)
- Judasz u Monte Sicuro (1957)
- Czarna Julka (1959)
- Siedem zegarków kopidoła Joachima Rybki (1960)
- Opowieści o ludziach z pociągu (1963)
- Górniczy zakon (1964)

=== Fairy tales collections ===
- Jak górnik Bulandra diabła oszukał (1961)
- Przedziwne śląskie powiarki (1961)
- Przedziwna historia o zbójniku Ondraszku (1963)

=== Books for children ===
- Narodziny serca (1932)
- Gwiazdy w studni (1933)
- Łysek z pokladu Idy (1933)
- Ludzie są dobrzy (1935)
- Miasteczko nad rzeką (1938)

=== Other works ===
- Śląsk (1933)
- Listy spod morwy (1945)
- Listy spod morwy (1946)
- Zabłąkane ptaki
- Urodzaj ludzi
- Ziemia cieszyńska
