= Dobczyce =

Town in Lesser Poland Voivodeship, Poland

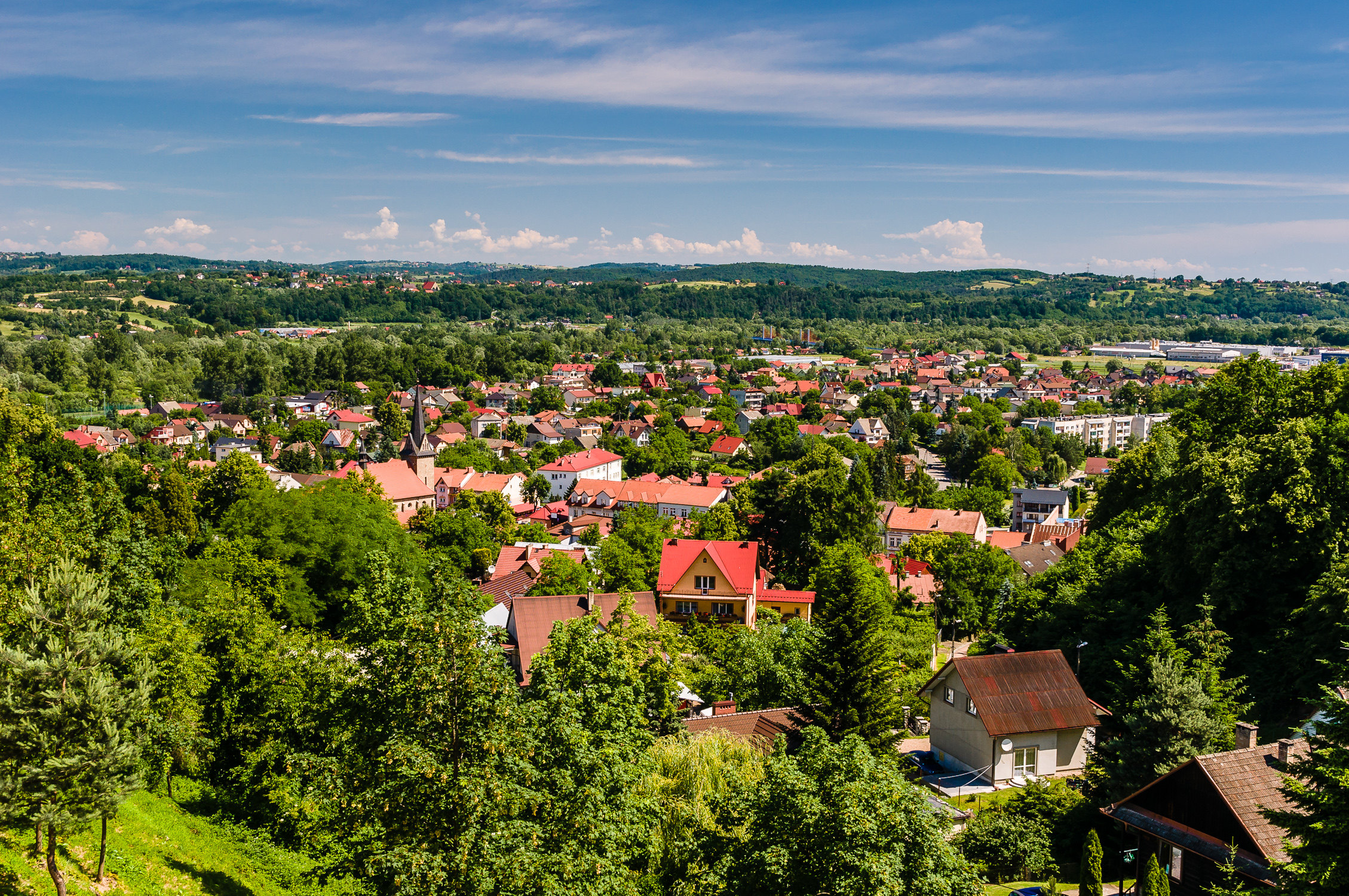
- Town view

- Flag Coat of arms

- Location within Poland
- Coordinates: 49°52′51″N 20°05′25″E
- Country: Poland
- Voivodeship: Lesser Poland
- County: Myślenice
- Gmina: Dobczyce
- Town rights: 1340

Government
  - Mayor: Tomasz Suś

Area
  - Total: 12.97 km^{2} (5.01 sq mi)

Population (31 December 2021)
  - Total: 6,388
  - Density: 492.5/km^{2} (1,276/sq mi)
- Time zone: UTC+1 (CET)
  - Summer (DST): UTC+2 (CEST)
- Postal code: 32-410
- Area code: +48 12
- Car plates: KMY
- Website: http://www.dobczyce.pl

Dobczyce [dɔpˈt͡ʂɨt͡sɛ] is a town in southern Poland, in the Lesser Poland Voivodeship. As of December 2021, the town has a population of 6,388.

There is a large dam with Lake Dobczyce on the Raba river, and a partially rebuilt 14th-century Dobczyce Castle, with ruins of a 14th-century defensive wall - which is open for tourists. Dobczyce is also the name of a small part of Bobrowniki Małe, a village in Lesser Poland.

== History ==
Dobczyce received its Magdeburg rights town charter probably in 1310, during the reign of Władysław Łokietek. The town was famous for its castle, where Jan Długosz liked to stay and work on his chronicles. Here, in 1450, Polish astronomer and dean of Kraków Academy Leonard Vitreatoris (Leonhard von Dobschütz) was born. Dobczyce enjoyed several royal privileges, allowing its residents to buy salt from nearby Wieliczka. The town was a local center of cloth and wool making, but the period of prosperity ended during the Swedish invasion of Poland (1655–1660). After the First Partition of Poland, Dobczyce was annexed by the Habsburg Empire, and from 1772 to 1918 belonged to Galicia. Following the German-Soviet invasion of Poland, which started World War II in September 1939, the town was occupied by Germany.

== Gallery ==
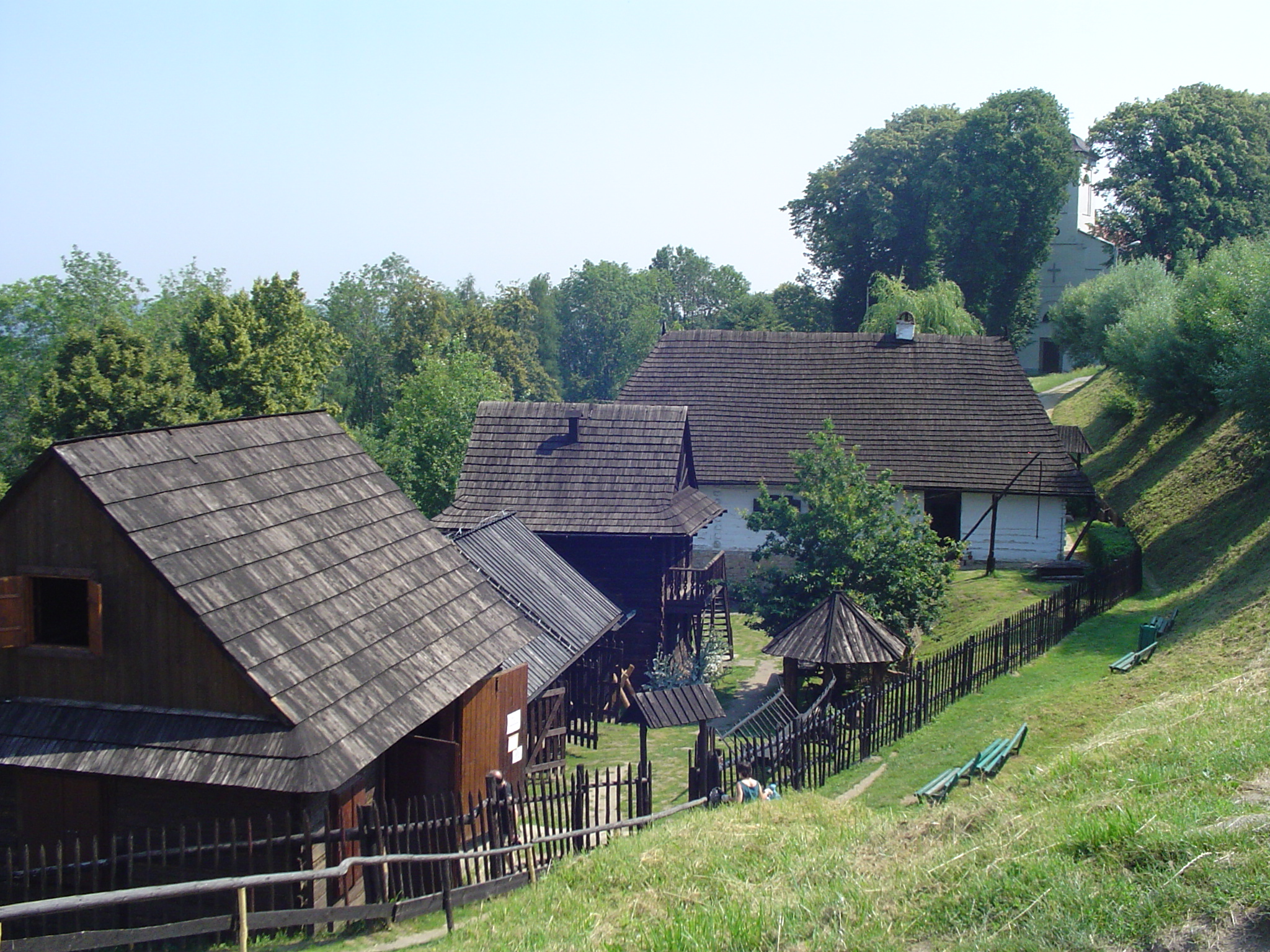
Open-air museum

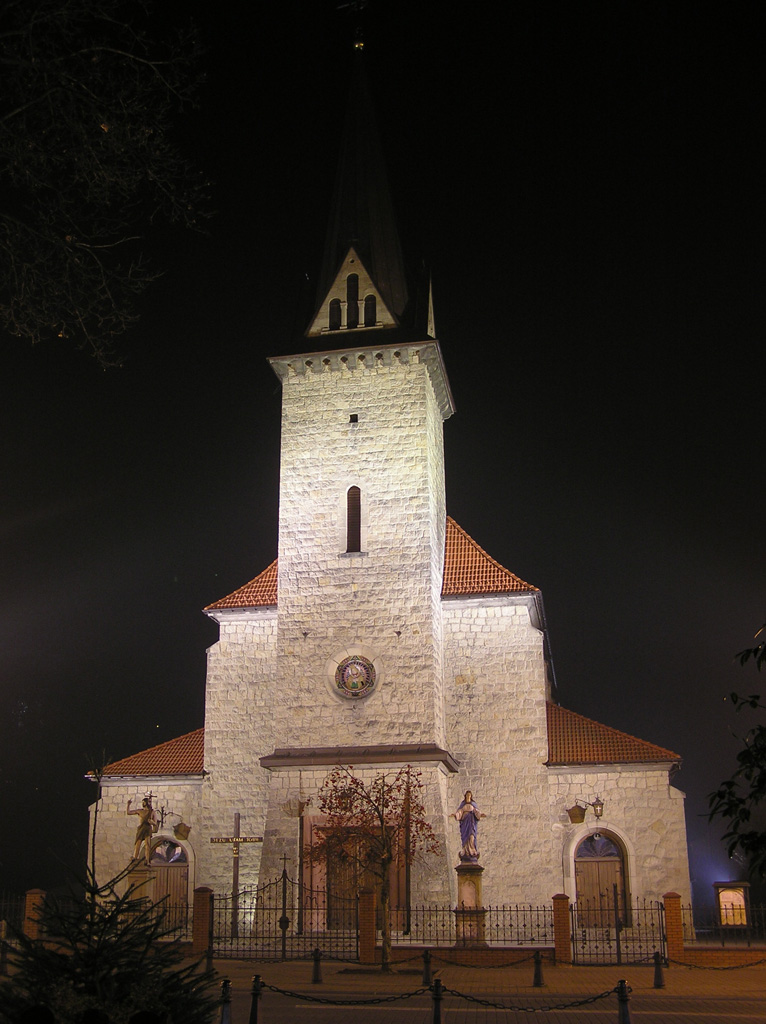
St. Mary's Church

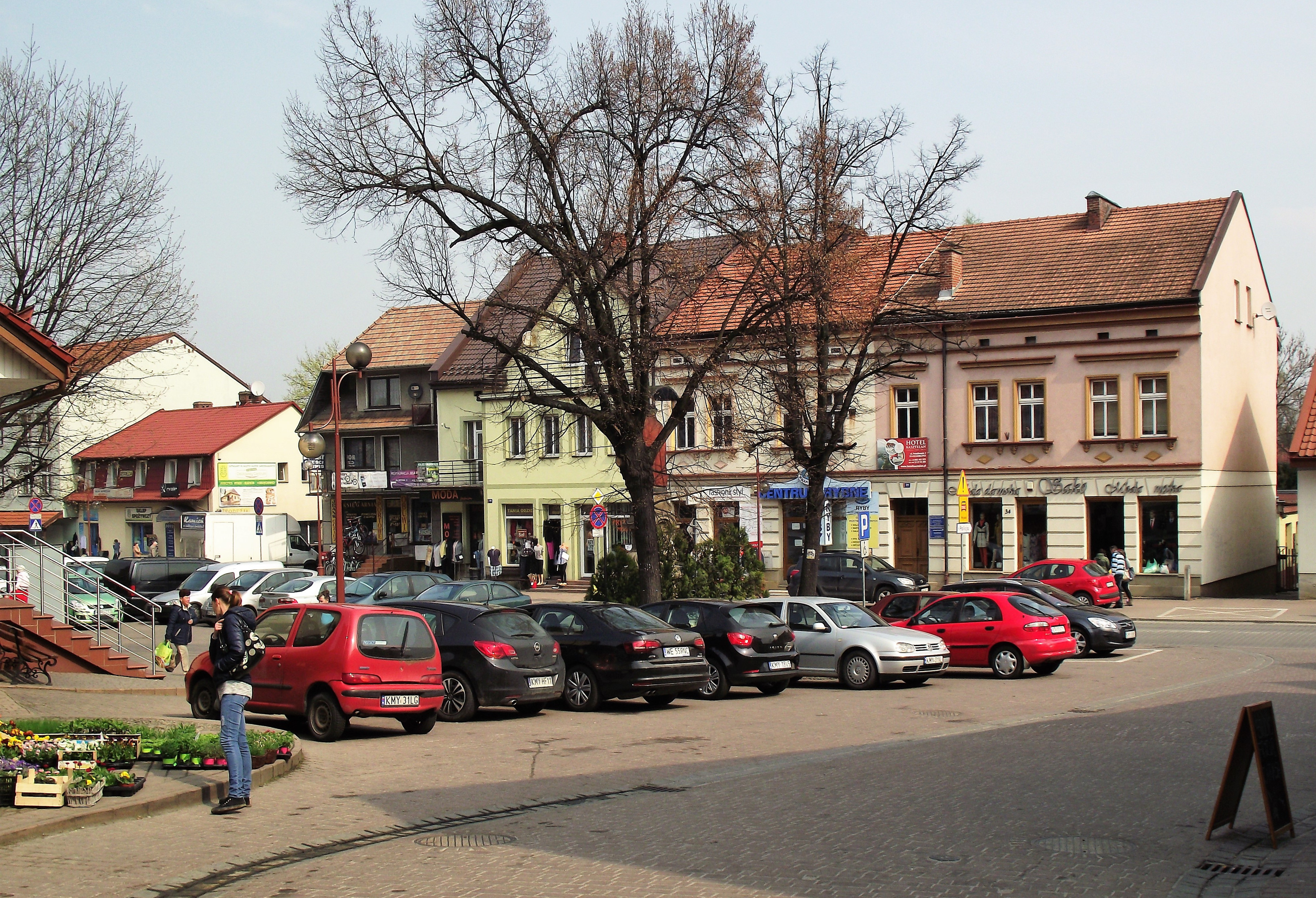
Market Square

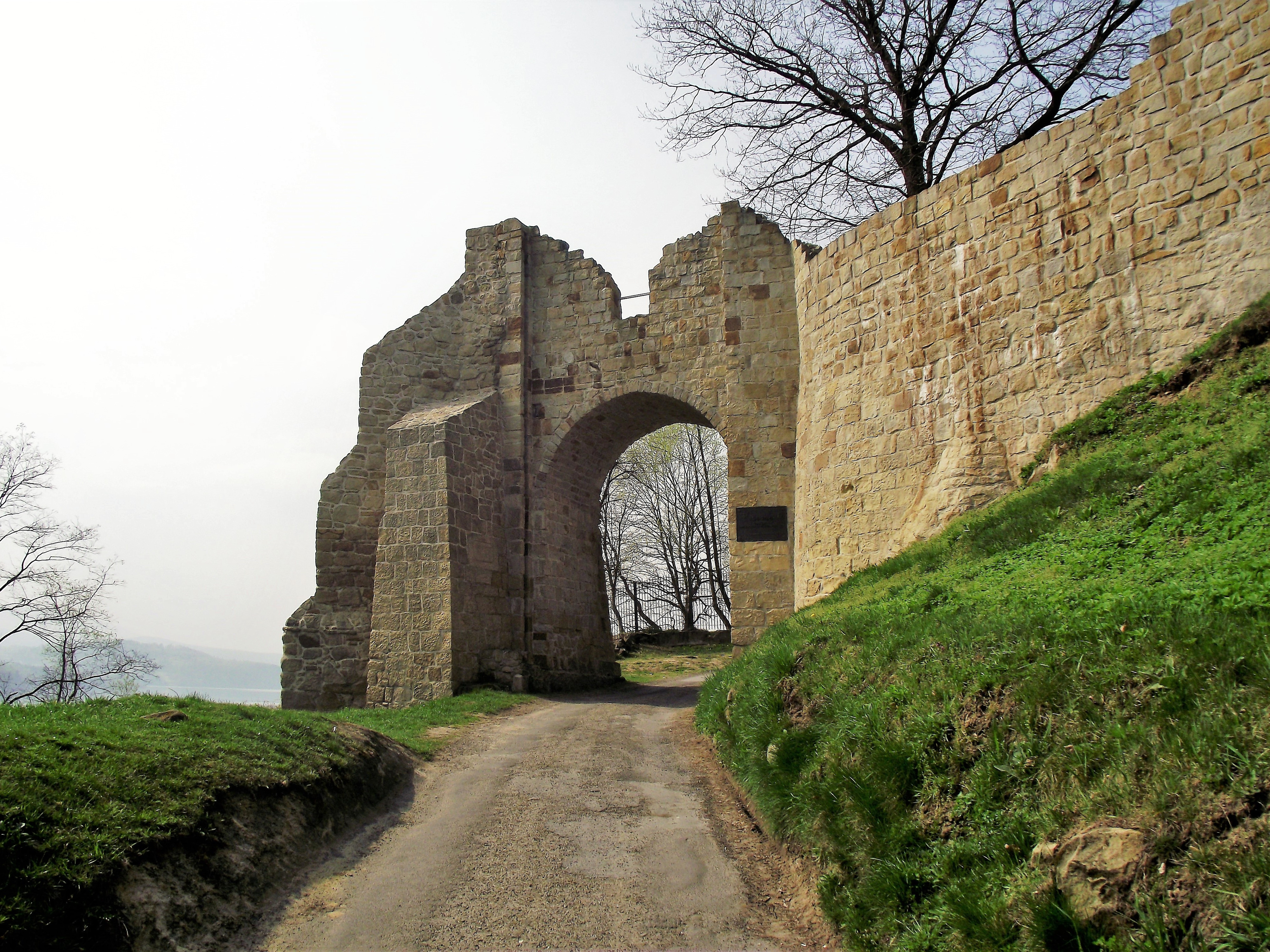
City gate

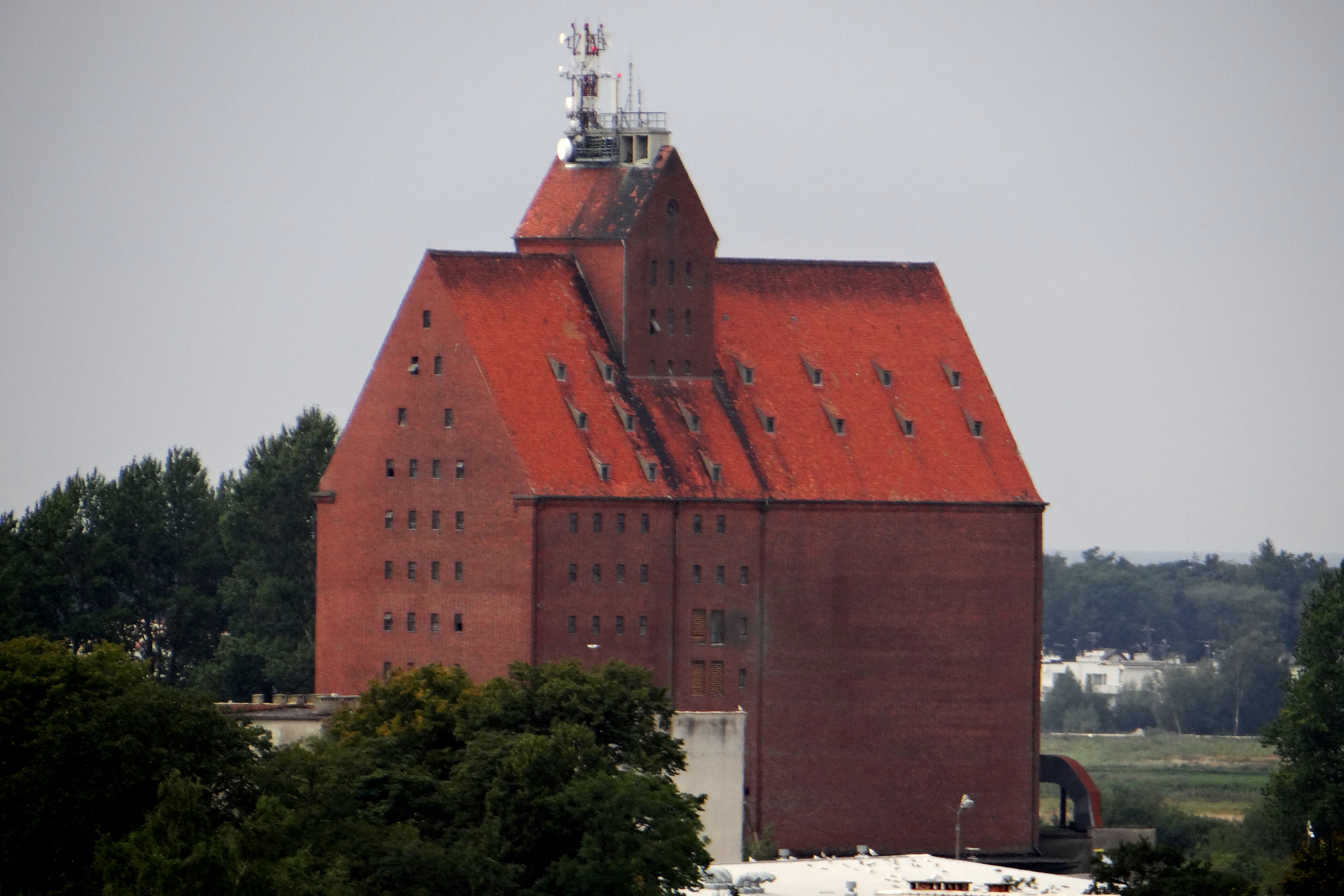
Grain warehouse

Cemetery
