= Polish flood of 1934 =

July 1934 natural disaster in Poland

1934 flood in Poland
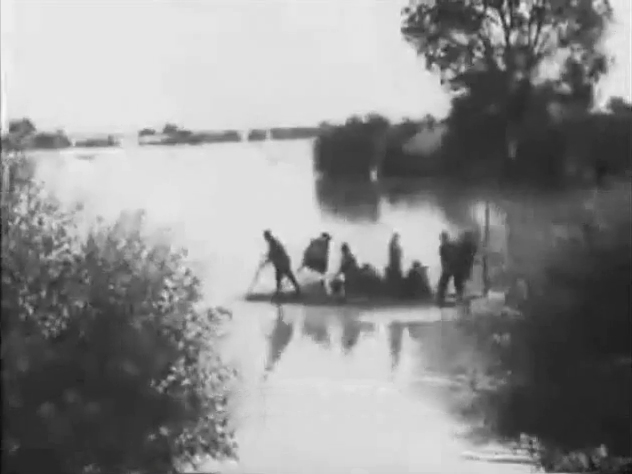
- Flooded Lesser Poland around Dobczyce

Meteorological history
- Duration: July 1934

Overall effects
- Fatalities: 55
- Damage: $12 million
- Areas affected: South-central Poland

Polish flood of 1934 (Polish: Powódź w Polsce, 1934) was the biggest flood in the Second Polish Republic. It began with heavy rains in the Dunajec river basin, which took place between 13 and 17 July 1934. In the following days, the flood spread to the basins of the Raba, Wisłoka, and Skawa, all of which are tributaries to the Vistula. The disaster took the lives of 55 people and caused damages estimated at 60 million interbellum zlotys.

== The flood ==
The first heavy rains took place on 13 July 1934, and it continued during the coming days, with more than 50 millimetres (2.0 in) of rain noted on 14 and 15 July. Peak of the rainfall was marked on 16 July, with heaviest rains ever recorded in the Dunajec basin. On that day, 85 mm (3.3 in) of rain fell in the village of Witów, and in Kuźnice—199 mm (7.8 in). On the same day, Polish record of rainfall was broken in Tatras valley of Hala Gąsienicowa, where 255 mm (10.0 in) were recorded. Even though the Dunajec basin was the most affected, heavy rain was also recorded in the basins of the Skawa, and the Wisłoka. Combined rain of two days (16 and 17 July) amounted in some locations to more than 300 mm (11.8 in). According to contemporary sources, some areas looked like giant seas, with only the chimneys of houses peeking above the water.

Levels of the rivers which have their sources in the Tatras and the Gorce Mountains rose immediately, and on 19 July the flood wave, swollen by excessive waters of the tributaries, appeared on the Vistula near Sandomierz. Due to pressure of the water, levees were broken, and thousands of acres of fields were covered in water. At the same time, this caused the flood wave to decrease, and by the time it reached Warsaw (22 July), it was much smaller than expected, and did not inflict much damage in Poland's capital.

== Effects ==
Altogether, the water flooded 1,260 square kilometres (490 sq mi), killing 55 people. Damaged or destroyed were 22,059 buildings, 167 kilometres (104 mi) of roads, and 78 bridges. The damages were estimated at US$12,000,000, or more than 60 million interbellum zlotys. As a result of the catastrophic flood, two reservoirs were constructed on the Sola, and the Dunajec. The Porąbka dam was finished in 1936, but the engineers didn't complete the Rożnów dam before the outbreak of World War II; the dam was completed by the Germans in 1941.
