= Old-Polish Industrial Region =

Region in north Lesser Poland

Old Polish Industrial Region (Polish: Staropolski Okręg Przemysłowy) is an industrial region in northern part of Lesser Poland. It is the oldest and in terms of area covered, largest of Polish industrial regions. Most of the region is located in Lesser Poland Upland, and its historic center lies along the Kamienna river. Primary industrial cities: Kielce, Radom, Ostrowiec Świętokrzyski, Starachowice and Skarżysko-Kamienna.

== History ==
In prehistoric times future Old Polish Industrial Region was the area of flint and later iron tools. In Nowa Slupia, remnants of forty five bloomeries were found (1th - 4th century). In the Middle Ages, the region became the center of Polish industry - mining and steel mills. Various kinds of weapons were manufactured here, iron ore, copper and silver were extracted. In the 17th century, first blast furnaces were opened in the villages of Samsonow and Bobrza. By 1782, out of 34 blast furnaces in Poland-Lithuania, as many as 27 were located in Old Polish Industrial Region. Furthermore, the area was a major glass producer of the country.

First half of the 19th century was the time of rapid development of the region, due to efforts of the government of Congress Poland, and such persons as Stanislaw Staszic and Franciszek Ksawery Drucki-Lubecki. Both officials planned construction of a large metallurgical plant along the Kamienna. Those plans, however, were only partially implemented, due to lack of funds. Still, several new plants were opened at that time.

Growth of Old Polish Industrial Region stopped in the second half of the 19th century, due to two reasons. First, Congress Poland lost its autonomy and became Vistula Land, integral part of the Russian Empire. Furthermore, another industrial center of Lesser Poland, Zaglebie Dabrowskie, began to develop and compete with Old Polish Industrial Region. As a result, several plants had to close down.

The region recovered in late years of the Second Polish Republic, when Central Industrial Area was envisaged by Eugeniusz Kwiatkowski. Already-existing factories in Kielce, Skarzysko, Radom, Starachowice and Ostrowiec were modernized, new ones were also built. After World War II, industrialization of the area continued, with such plants, as FSC Star.

== Main locations ==
Major urban centers of the region are Kielce, Radom, Starachowice, Ostrowiec Świętokrzyski and Skarżysko-Kamienna, which is an important railroad junction. Names of several villages indicate their industrial past, even though no traces of former plants remain there (Ruda, Kuźnica, Hucisko, Żelaznica, Górniki, Rudniki, Wąglów, Wólka Smolna, Kurzacze).
