= Old Poland Voivodeship =

Old Poland Voivodeship (Polish: Wojewodztwo staropolskie) was a proposed Voivodeship of Poland, which, however, has not been created. It was to cover the area of northern part of the historical province of Lesser Poland, with such cities as Częstochowa, Kielce and Sandomierz (first draft also included Radom).

== First talks ==
First talks about creation of the new voivodeship took place on February 13, 1998 in the village of Zloty Potok. Participants were local politicians from three voivodeships - Radomskie, Kieleckie and Czestochowskie. All knew that according to the 1998 Local Government Reorganization Act, territorial organization of Poland would significantly change, with the removal of most of the voivodeships, and therefore they decided to act.

A week later, on February 20, 1998, another meeting took place. This time, there were no representatives from Radom, they were replaced by politicians from western part of the Tarnobrzeg Voivodeship, together with the city of Sandomierz (but without the cities of Tarnobrzeg and Stalowa Wola), who expressed their desire to join the proposed province.

== Włoszczowa Agreement ==
On July 4, 1998 in Włoszczowa, politicians from Kielce, Częstochowa and Sandomierz signed the so-called Włoszczowa Agreement. It included a joint statement, which backed creation of the Old Poland Voivodeship, with the seat of a Voivode located in Częstochowa and seat of the local parliament in Kielce. The text of the agreement was handed to the central authorities of Poland on July 8.

However, the initiative failed, as the Local Government Reorganization Act created the Swietokrzyskie Voivodeship, which did not include the area of Częstochowa, as it became part of the Silesian Voivodeship.

== Size and population ==
According to the Włoszczowa Agreement, the proposed Voivodeship would cover the area of 17 006 km^{2}. Its population (as for 2006) would be 1 995 000, with 48.8% living in urban areas. It would be made out of two urban counties (cities of Częstochowa and Kielce), and eighteen land counties. These were:

- Busko-Zdrój County,
- Częstochowa County,
- Jędrzejów County,
- Kazimierza Wielka County,
- Kielce County,
- Kłobuck County,
- Końskie County,
- Myszków County,
- Opaczow County,
- Ostrowiec Świętokrzyski County,
- Pajęczno County,
- Pińczów County,
- Radomsko County,
- Sandomierz County,
- Skarżysko-Kamienna County,
- Starachowice County,
- Staszów County,
- Włoszczowa County.

== See also ==
- Voivodeships of Poland
- List of proposed voivodeships of Poland
