= Rożnów, Lesser Poland Voivodeship =

Rożnów
- Village
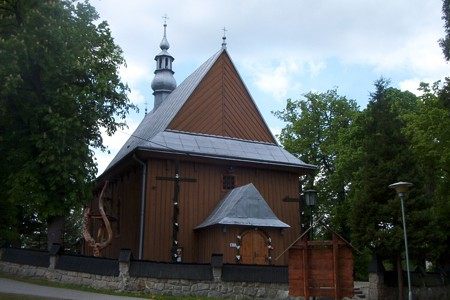
- Church

- Location within Poland
- Coordinates: 49°46′32″N 20°42′6″E
- Country: Poland
- Voivodeship: Lesser Poland
- County: Nowy Sącz
- Gmina: Gródek nad Dunajcem
- Population: 1,700

Rożnów [ˈrɔʐnuf] is a village in the administrative district of Gmina Gródek nad Dunajcem, within Nowy Sącz County, Lesser Poland Voivodeship, in southern Poland.

== Rożnów Dam ==
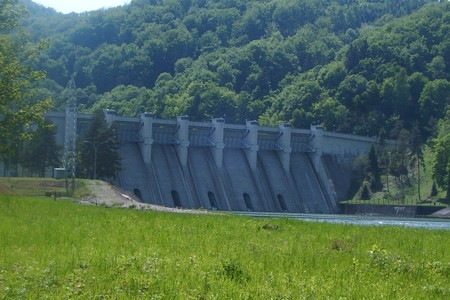
Rożnów Dam

Rożnów is the location of a dam on the Dunajec and a power station built in 1935–1941. The dam was constructed originally to prevent flooding after the disastrous 1934 flood in Poland which took the lives of 55 people and caused damages estimated at 60 million interbellum zlotys; the biggest flood in the Second Polish Republic.

The construction of the Rożnów Dam resulted in the creation of the Lake Rożnów which took two years to fill along the 80-kilometre (50 mi) stretch of the Dunajec river. The depth of the reservoir reaches 30 metres (98 ft).
