= Eugeniusz Kwiatkowski =

Polish politician and economist (1888–1974)

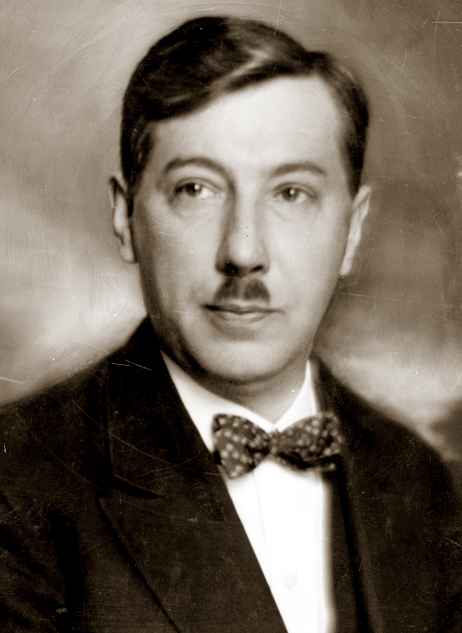
- Eugeniusz Kwiatkowski

Deputy Prime Minister of Poland
- In office 13 October 1935 – 30 September 1939
- Prime Minister: Felicjan Sławoj Składkowski
- Preceded by: Władysław Marian Zawadzki
- Succeeded by: Adam Koc

Minister of Treasury
- In office 13 October 1935 – 30 September 1939
- Prime Minister: Marian Zyndram-Kościałkowski; Felicjan Sławoj Składkowski
- Preceded by: Władysław Marian Zawadzki
- Succeeded by: Adam Koc

Minister of Industry and Trade
- In office 4 June 1926 – 4 December 1930
- Prime Minister: Kazimierz Bartel; Józef Piłsudski; Kazimierz Świtalski; Walery Sławek
- Preceded by: Hipolit Gliwic
- Succeeded by: Aleksander Prystor

Personal details
- Born: 30 December 1888 Kraków, Galicia, Austria-Hungary
- Died: 22 August 1974 (aged 85) Kraków, Poland
- Resting place: Rakowicki Cemetery
- Party: Camp of National Unity
- Occupation: Economist, politician
- Awards: Order of the White Eagle (Poland) Grand Cross of the Order of Polonia Restituta Commander's Cross with Star of the Order of Polonia Restituta Commander's Cross of the Order of Polonia Restituta Cross of Independence Grand Officer of the Legion of Honour Grand Cross of the Order of the Star of Romania Grand Cross of the Order of the Crown of Romania Grand Cross of the Order of the Three Stars Grand Cross of the Order of St Sava (Kingdom of Yugoslavia) Grand Cross with Chain of the Order of the Polar Star Grand Cross of the Order of St. Olav Grand Cross of the Order of the White Lion Grand Cross of the Order of the Dannebrog Grand Cross of the Order of the Phoenix (Greece) Grand Cross of the Order of the Crown (Belgium) Grand Cross of the Hungarian Order of Merit

Military service
- Branch/service: Polish Legions
- Battles/wars: World War I

Eugeniusz Kwiatkowski (30 December 1888, Kraków – 22 August 1974, Kraków) was a Polish politician and economist, Deputy Prime Minister of Poland, government minister and manager of the Second Polish Republic.

== Biography ==
He studied at the prestigious Jesuit college in Chyrów, and then graduated chemistry at the University of Lwów and the Ludwig-Maximilians-Universität München (LMU).

After Józef Piłsudski's May coup d'état of 1926 in the Second Polish Republic, he was recommended by president Ignacy Mościcki for the post Minister of Industry and Trade in the government of Kazimierz Bartel. Kwiatkowski was a minister in eight successive governments (1926–30) and Deputy Prime Minister of Poland and Minister of Finance of Poland in two governments (1935–39).

Among the most famous achievements of Kwiatkowski are the giant construction projects: the construction of Gdynia seaport, the development of the Polish Merchant Navy and sea trade, and the creation of Centralny Okręg Przemysłowy (The Central Industrial Region).

After the Soviet Union joined Nazi Germany in the invasion of Poland in 1939, he evacuated Poland with the rest of the Government on 17 September. He was interned in Romania until 1945. He returned to Poland and supervised the projects of reconstruction of the Polish seacoast, and in the years 1947–1952, he was a deputy to the Polish parliament (Sejm).

With the strengthening of the communist and Soviet grip on the Polish government, which he opposed, he fell out of favour of the communist government of the Polish People's Republic and was forced to retire in 1948. From 1952 onward, he concentrated on studies of chemistry, physics, and history.

He died in Kraków on 22 August 1974.

== Honours and awards ==
Country	Decoration	Date of issue
Poland	Order of the White Eagle	11 November 1996
Poland	Grand Cross of the Order of Polonia Restituta	9 November 1931
Poland	Commander's Cross with Star of the Order of Polonia Restituta	1972
Poland	Commander's Cross of the Order of Polonia Restituta	19 July 1947
Poland	Cross of Independence	20 December 1932
France	Grand Officer of the Legion of Honour	Unknown
Kingdom of Romania	Grand Cross of the Order of the Star of Romania	Unknown; 1930s
Kingdom of Romania	Grand Cross of the Order of the Crown of Romania	Unknown
Latvia	Grand Cross of the Order of the Three Stars	Around 1928-1930
Kingdom of Yugoslavia	Grand Cross of the Order of St. Sava	Unknown
Sweden	Grand Cross with Chain of the Order of the Polar Star	Unknown
Norway	Grand Cross of the Order of St. Olav	Unknown
Czechoslovakia	Grand Cross of the Order of the White Lion	Unknown
Denmark	Grand Cross of the Order of the Dannebrog	Unknown
Greece	Grand Cross of the Order of the Phoenix	Unknown
Belgium	Grand Cross of the Order of the Crown	Unknown
Hungary	Grand Cross of the Hungarian Order of Merit	Unknown

== Legacy ==
In 2018, he was added by the Polish government to the passport visa pages as one of many individuals who are remembered for their contributions to Poland.

== Works ==
- Zagadnienie przemysłu chemicznego na tle wielkiej wojny (1923)
- Postęp gospodarczy Polski (Economic Progress of Poland) (1928)
- Polska gospodarcza w roku 1928 (Economic Poland in 1928) (1928)
- Powrót Polski nad Bałtyk (The Return of Poland to Baltic) (1930)
- Dysproporcje. Rzecz o Polsce przeszłej i obecnej (1932)
- "Rzecz najważniejsza Polska" - Wybór myśli politycznych i społecznych (1988) - selection of his papers

== See also ==
- List of Poles

== Bibliography ==
- Janusz Zaręba, Eugeniusz Kwiatkowski - romantyczny pragmatyk, Centrum Edukacji i Rozwoju Biznesu. Instytut Naukowo-Wydawniczy, Warszawa, 1998 (ISBN 83-86069-85-6)
- Archiwum polityczne Eugeniusza Kwiatkowskiego, Wydawnictwo Sejmowe, Warszawa, 2002 (ISBN 83-7059-612-6)
- Marian Marek Drozdowski, Eugeniusz Kwiatkowski, Zakład Narodowy im. Ossolińskich - Wydawnictwo, Wrocław, 2001 (ISBN 83-04-04567-2)
- Marian Marek Drozdowski, Eugeniusz Kwiatkowski w polskiej historiografii i publicystyce historyczno-ekonomicznej, Instytut Historii Polskiej Akademii Nauk, Warszawa, 1992 (ISBN 83-900329-3-7)
- Marian Marek Drozdowski, Eugeniusz Kwiatkowski : człowiek i dzieło, Wydawnictwo Literackie, Kraków, 1989 (ISBN 83-08-02092-5)
- Marian Marek Drozdowski, Piotr Dwojacki, Archiwum Morskie Eugeniusza Kwiatkowskiego, E. Kwiatkowski University of Business and Administration, Gdynia, 2009 (ISBN 83-62215-00-3)
