= Robert Serebrenik =

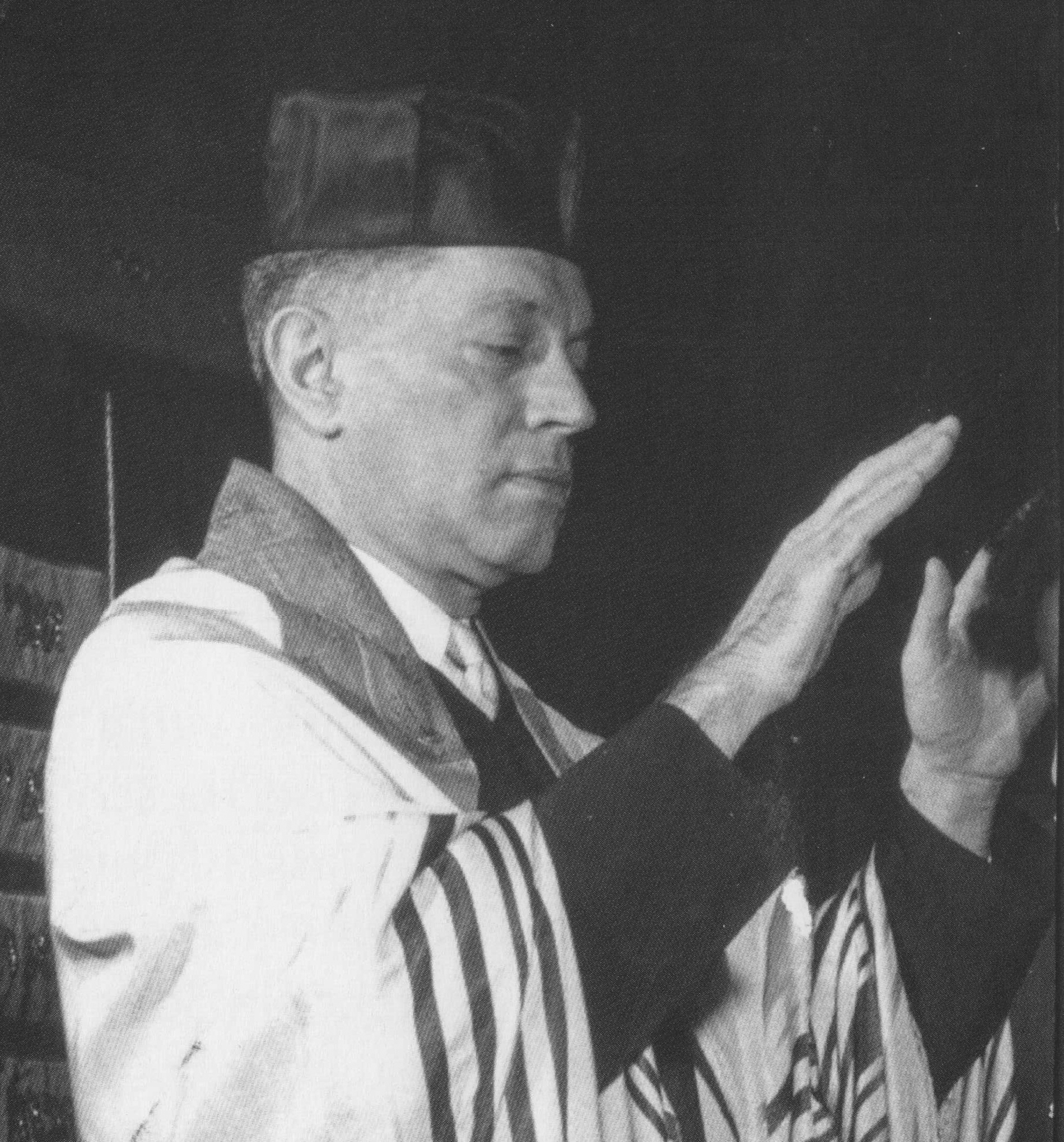

Robert Serebrenik (March 4, 1902 – February 11, 1965) was an Austrian-born Chief Rabbi of Luxembourg who later lived and ministered in the US.

== Life ==
Serebrenik was born on March 4, 1902, in Vienna, Austria-Hungary, the son of Peisach Serebrenik and Theresia Reiß.

Serebrenik became Chief Rabbi of Luxembourg in January 1929. He was still Chief Rabbi when the German invasion of Luxembourg began on May 10, 1940. The country was conquered within several hours that day, after which he focused on mediating between the Nazi occupiers and the Luxembourg Jewish community and saving as many Jewish lives as he could. He was initially ordered to be discharged as Chief Rabbi when the Occupation began, but after he notified the authorities that Nazi regulations stipulated an Aryan was to replace every Jewish official removed from their post (which obviously could not be done in his case) he was allowed to remain Chief Rabbi with his salary intact. This led him to claim "I was the only Jew in all Nazi-occupied Europe on the official German payroll."

Serebrenik helped the community emigrate to other countries, visiting Lisbon with Albert Nussbaum (a communal leader) on several occasions to deal with emigration issues there, although one survivor claimed he got rich in the process and some people embittered against him to the point where Austrian Jews beat him up once. He testified that he personally organized the emigration of 2,500 Jews out of Luxembourg, although one source considered this an exaggeration. He went to Berlin on several occasions to deal with emigration issues, and in March 1941 he and Consistoire president Louis Sternberg were escorted to Berlin by two Gestapo officers to report directly to Adolf Eichmann. In a meeting attended by Leo Baeck, Paul Epstein of the Reich Association of the Jews in Germany, and Berthold Storfer, Eichmann declared that Luxembourg was to be declared cleansed of all Jews and deportations East were to begin immediately. Eichmann also ordered a halt to emigration to southern France and for Serebrenik to obtain funding for transports to Lisbon from the Joint Distribution Committee, warning him the borders would soon be closed.

Serebrenik then returned to Luxembourg and tried to save the remaining thousand Jews in the country from being deported East, and while he failed to save the rest of the remaining community he managed to organize a transport of 250 Jews to Lisbon. While walking home from the Great Synagogue of Luxembourg one Shabbat, Nazi thugs almost beat him to death. The Nazis began demolishing the Synagogue shortly afterwards. He stayed in Luxembourg as long as he could. On 27 May 1941 he left on one of the last convoys out of the country. On 10 June he and his wife left Lisbon aboard the Portuguese ship Mouzinho with 61 other refugees from Luxembourg. The ship reached Staten Island on 21 June, and the Serebreniks settled in New York City. In 1942, he and other Luxembourg Jewish refugees established Congregation Ramath Orah and became its rabbi. In 1961, he went to Israel and testified in the Eichmann trial. He was active in the Union of Orthodox Rabbis of the United States and Canada, the Manhattan Day School and the World Jewish Congress.

In 1930 Serebrenik married Julia Herzog of Vienna.

Serebrenik died at home from a heart attack on February 11, 1965.
