= Ramath Orah =

Modern Orthodox synagogue in Manhattan, New York

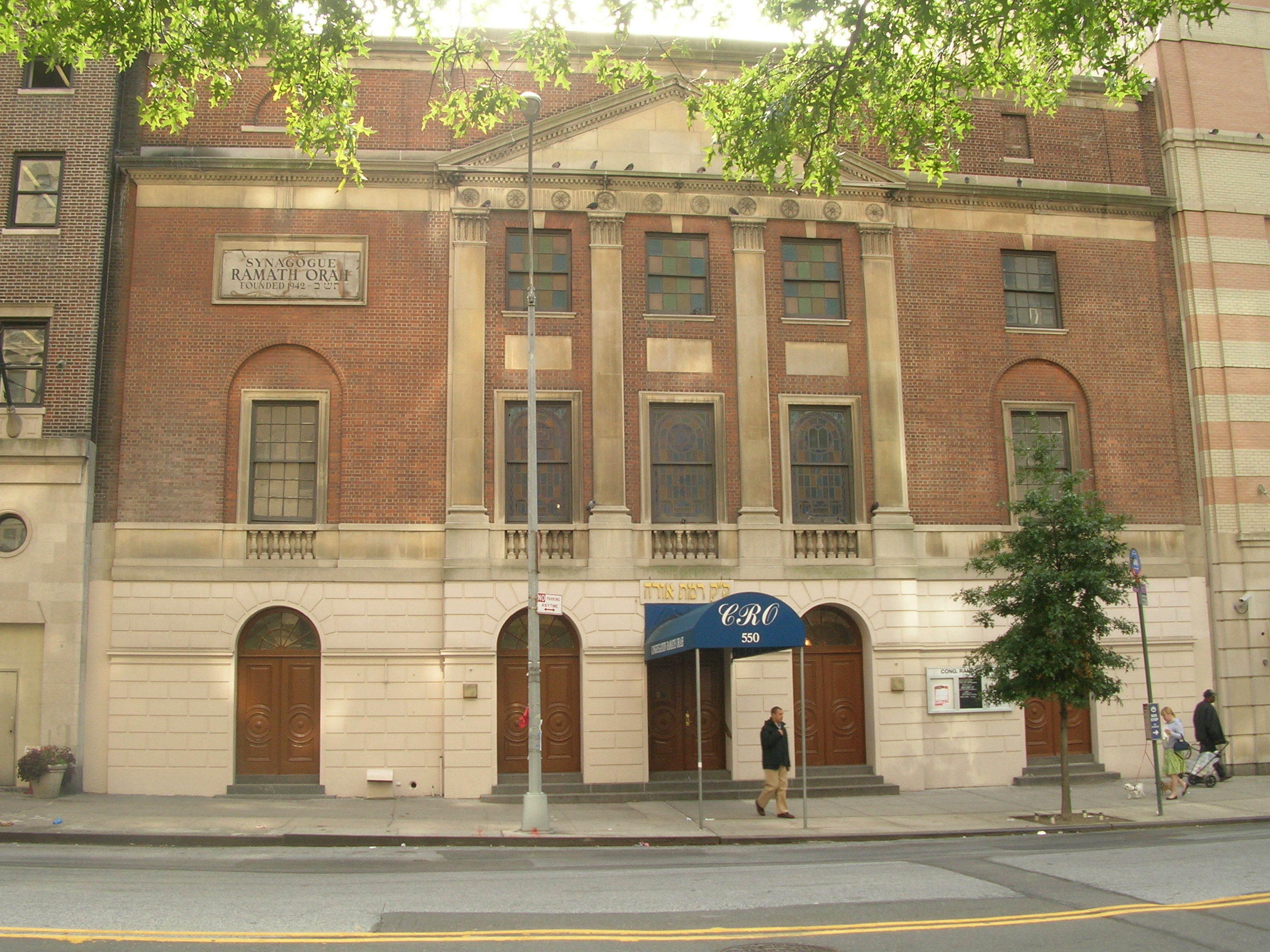
- Ramath Orah synagogue

- Location in Manhattan

Religion
- Affiliation: Modern Orthodox Judaism
- Ecclesiastical or organisational status: Synagogue
- Status: Active

Location
- Location: West 110th Street, Upper West Side, Manhattan, New York City, New York
- Country: United States
- Coordinates: 40°48′13.24″N 73°57′58.02″W

Architecture
- Type: Synagogue
- Style: Georgian Revival
- Founder: Rabbi Dr Robert Serebrenik; Mrs Julia Serebrenik (née Herzog); anor.
- Established: 1941 (as a congregation)
- Completed: 1942 (converted the West Side Unitarian Church)
- Materials: Brick; rolled asphalt; granite, limestone

Website
- ramathorah.org
- West Side Unitarian Church – Congregation Ramath Orah
- U.S. National Register of Historic Places
- NRHP reference No.: 15000608
- Added to NRHP: September 17, 2015

Ramath Orah is a Modern Orthodox synagogue located on West 110th Street on the Upper West Side of Manhattan, in New York City, New York, United States. Located close to Columbia University the synagogue occupies a neo-Georgian building that was built in 1921 as the first stage of a large West Side Unitarian Church.

The building was entered into the National Register of Historic Places on September 17, 2015.

== History ==
The congregation was founded in 1942 by Rabbi Dr. Robert Serebrenik, his wife Mrs. Julia Serebrenik (née Herzog), and sixty-one other Jewish refugees from Luxembourg. Serebrenik, who was born in Vienna in 1902, had been Chief Rabbi of Luxembourg since 1929. About 1000 Jews fled into France at the time of the German invasion of Luxembourg, May 10, 1940. Luxembourg had approximately 4,000 Jewish residents at the beginning of WWII, about half of whom had recently sought refuge there from Nazi countries. Rabbi and Mrs. Serebrenik stayed and organized a series of clandestine escapes of about 2,000 members of the Jewish population into southern, unoccupied France and elsewhere. On March 20, 1941, Serebrenik met in Berlin with Adolf Eichmann who demanded that Luxembourg must be “Judenrein”, and was given eleven days to complete the emigration of the Jewish population from Luxembourg. Serebrenik managed to secure the exit of a further 250 Jews before he and his wife were driven out by the Gestapo. According to the New York Times, Serebrenik stayed, working to secure visas for more Jews, “until he was seized by the Gestapo and beaten unconscious.”

With the new century, Ramath Orah experienced a revival with a dynamic, young Rabbi Stephen Friedman. The Columbia Spectator describes it as “very popular among Columbia students who want a spirited, liberal, Orthodox service."

The Hebrew name Ramath Orah is said to reflect a translation of the name Luxembourg as Mountain of Light, although the former's etymology is a Germanic name meaning little castle.

Ramath Orah is the synagogue described in Ari L. Goldman’s book, Living a Year of Kaddish.

== Notable members ==
- Diana Muir Appelbaum, a professor
- Paul S. Appelbaum, a professor
- Saul Berman, a rabbi
- Ester Fuchs, a professor
- Ari L. Goldman, a professor
- Louis Henkin, a professor
- Adam Zachary Newton, a professor
- David Schizer, a dean
- Ismar Schorsch, a rabbi
- Robert Serebrenik, a rabbi
- Joseph Telushkin, a rabbi

== See also ==
- History of the Jews in Luxembourg
