= Paweł Sarna =

Paweł Sarna may refer to:

- Paweł Sarna (poet) (born 1977), Polish poet
- Paweł Sarna (canoeist) (born 1984), Polish slalom canoeist
