= Memorial to the victims of the Shoah =

Holocaust memorial in Luxembourg

Coordinates: 49.60898°N 6.13173°E

The Memorial to the Victims of the Shoah (lux.: Mémorial de la déportation juive) was inaugurated on 17 June 2018 in the city of Luxembourg. The monument commemorates the persecution, deportation and murder of native Jews and those who fled to Luxembourg during the National Socialist dictatorship. The 17th of June 2018 was chosen for the inauguration because 75 years earlier, on the 17th of June 1943, the last deportation train with Jews had left Luxembourg, and the location, Boulevard Roosevelt, because the first synagogue of Luxembourg existed nearby.

== Monument and commemorative plaque ==
The sculpture by the Franco-Israeli artist Shelomo Selinger is intended to be both monument and memorial to the same person and to remind the Jewish population of the inhumanity of the Nazis and to contribute to the fact that such crimes must never be repeated.

The monument was erected on Roosevelt Boulevard between the cathedral and the former monastery of St. Sophia. The State and the City of Luxembourg paid a total of 325,000 Euros for this monument. The monument is made of grey-pink granite.

Following the inauguration of the Schoah monument, a plaque in Luxembourgish and French was unveiled in the vestibule of the train station, commemorating the deportation trains during the Second World War: “Erënner Dech beim Laanschtgoen drun, datt vun 1941 bis 1943 vun dëser Gare 658 jiddesch Männer, Fraen a Kanner an d'Nazi Ghettoen a Lager déportéiert goufen, wou si kalbliddeg ëmbruecht gi sin.“

== History ==
The permanent presence of Jews in Luxembourg has been documented since 1276. There is said to have been a first settlement in front of the Sankt-Ulrich-Tor. The Jewish cemetery in Clausen was built in 1817 and in 1823 at the Seminargässl behind the cathedral (see Ons Stad Nr. 25 of 1987) the first synagogue was solemnly inaugurated. It was built in Moorish-Byzantine style according to the plans of Professor Levi from Karlsruhe. After years of searching a new synagogue at the corner of Rue Aldringen - Rue Notre Dame could be moved into in 1894. This synagogue was destroyed by the Nazis in autumn 1943.

In 1927 a total of 1,771 people of Jewish descent were in Luxembourg, by 1935 there were 3,144, 870 of whom were of Luxembourg nationality. In 1940, about 3700 Jews (about one percent of the total population) lived in Luxembourg. Of the 3,700 Jews living in Luxembourg, only about 2,500 survived.

From 16 October 1941 to 17 June 1943, 658 Jewish women, men and children were deported in seven transports.

In 1969, on the initiative of the "Comité Auschwitz Luxembourg", a monument in honour of the Shoa victims was erected in Fünfbrunnen. It consists of granite stones broken by prisoners in the Natzweiler-Struthof concentration camp during the war. The monument depicts a tortured Person.

In 2012, the Luxembourg government under Jean-Claude Juncker commissioned the University of Luxembourg to draw up a report on the role of the Luxembourg administration during the Second World War. According to the Artuso report, 1,300 Jews living in Luxembourg in 1940 were deported to death camps.

In 2013, MemoShoah, one of the associations actively involved in historical recollection work, was founded. Chairman: Henri Juda.

On 9 June 2015, the Luxembourg Parliament adopted a motion for a resolution and apologised to the Jewish community of Luxembourg for the suffering inflicted upon it during the Nazi occupation of Germany.

The monument was inaugurated on 17 June 2018 in the presence of Grand Duke Henri and his wife Maria Teresa. Speeches were given by the Mayor of the City of Luxembourg, Lydie Polfer, the President of the Consistoire israélite de Luxembourg, Albert Aflalo, and the Prime Minister of Luxembourg, Xavier Bettel.

== Fondation Shoah ==
With the erection of the monument, a foundation (Fondatioun Shoah) was also set up, which received a foundation capital of 250,000 euros from the Luxembourg state.
