= Luxembourg Synagogue =

Jewish Synagogue in Luxembourg City

- Luxembourgish: Synagog Stad Lëtzebuerg
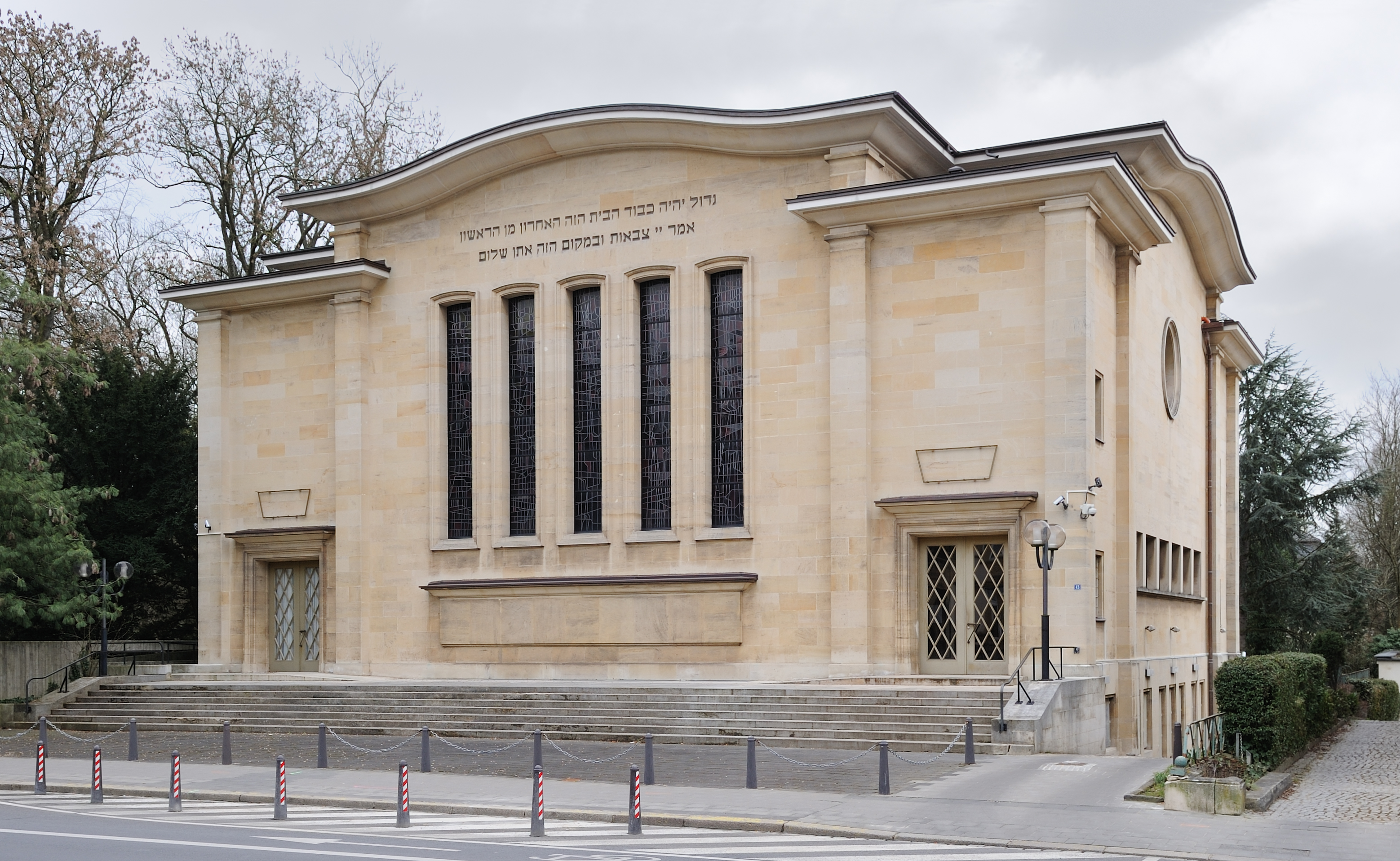
- The current Luxembourg Synagogue

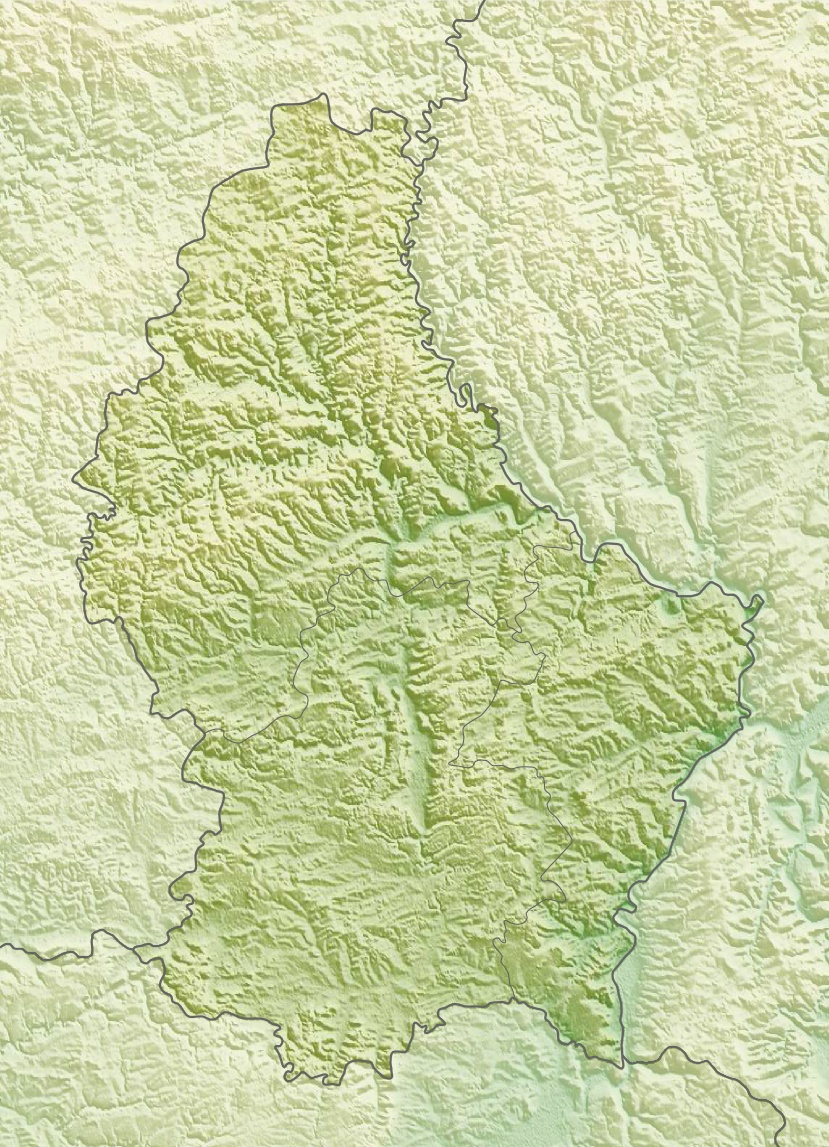
- Location in Luxembourg

Religion
- Affiliation: Orthodox Judaism
- Ecclesiastical or organizational status: Synagogue
- Status: Active

Location
- Location: 45 avenue Monterey (d), Luxembourg City
- Country: Luxembourg
- Interactive map of Luxembourg Synagogue
- Coordinates: 49°36′35″N 6°07′18″E

Architecture
- Architects: Victor Engels (1953); René Mailliet (1953)
- General contractor: Frantz Kinnen (windows)
- Completed: 1823 (R. du Petit-Séminaire); 1895 (R. Notre-Dame); 1953 (Avenue Monterey)

The Luxembourg Synagogue (Luxembourgish: Synagog Stad Lëtzebuerg) is an Orthodox Jewish synagogue, located on Avenue Monterey, in Luxembourg City, Luxembourg.

== History ==
=== The first synagogue ===
The first synagogue in Luxembourg City was founded in 1823 on Rue du Petit-Séminaire (today Rue de la Congrégation). Samuel Hirsch served as the first Chief Rabbi in 1843. The synagogue left this location in 1891 and was replaced by Congrégation de Notre-Dame. A memorial for the deportation of Jews was installed at this location on June 17, 2018.

=== The second synagogue ===
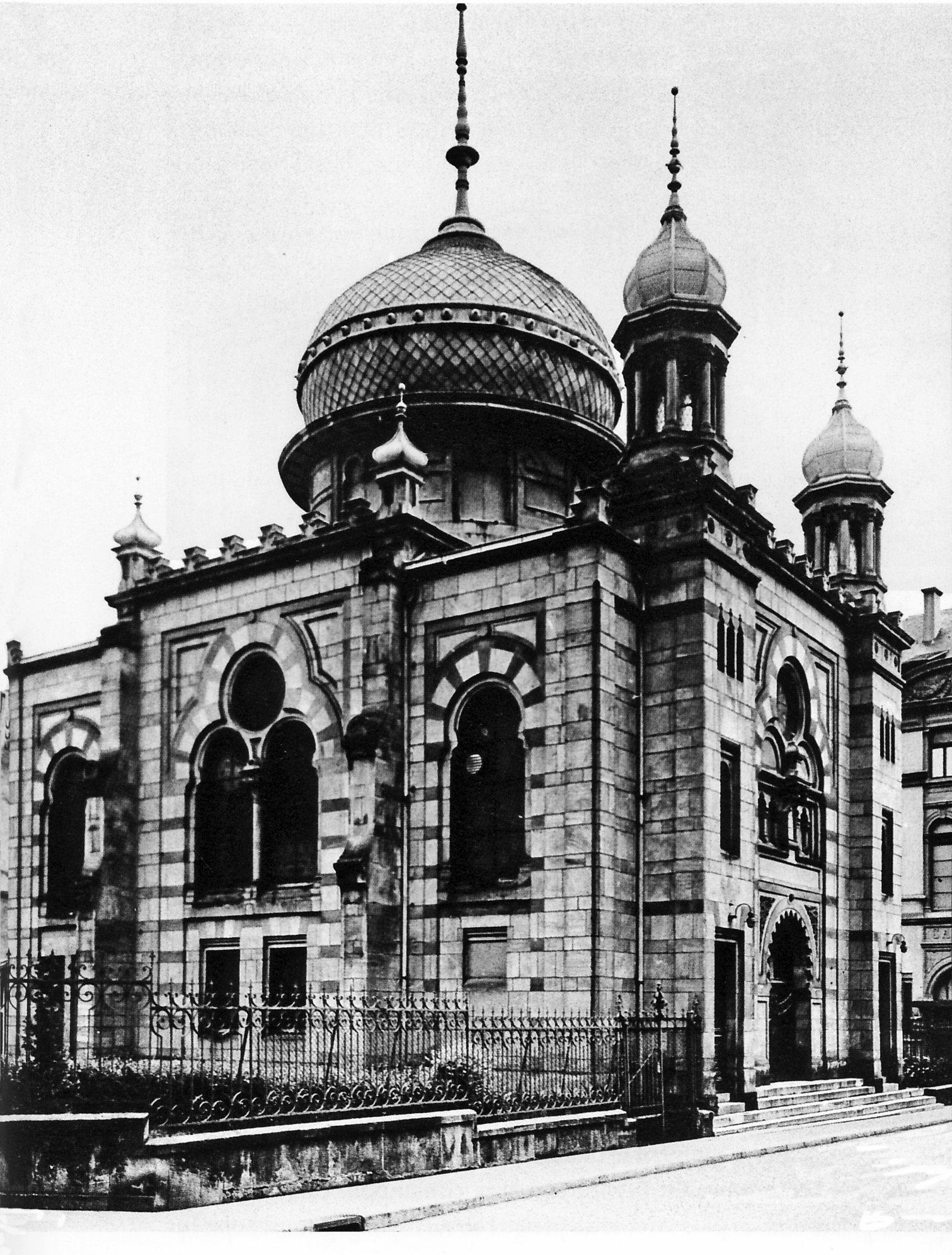
The former synagogue (1894–1941)

In 1894 a new synagogue was built at the corner of Rue Notre-Dame and Rue Aldringen. It was designed by German architects Ludwig Levy and Charles Arendt who also oversaw construction. The synagogue was built in a Moorish Revival style similar to the Great Synagogue of Florence. It had room for 300 people: 150 for male worshippers, 120 for female worshippers and 30 seats for the chorus and schoolchildren. It was opened on September 28, 1894 by Chief Rabbi Isaac Blumenstein and members of the government and communal council. In May 1941, the synagogue was desecrated by the Gestapo and was progressively demolished until 1943, when it became difficult to find a company willing to do the work.

=== The third synagogue ===
Plans for a third synagogue were prepared by architects Victor Engels and René Mailliet. The windows of the synagogue were designed by Frantz Kinnen.

Construction began on June 12, 1951 on Avenue Monterey. The synagogue was consecrated on June 28, 1953 by Chief Rabbi Charles Lehrmann in the presence of Grand Duke Jean.

In November 2018, a commemorative plaque was placed at the location of the destroyed synagogue on Rue Notre-Dame.

== See also ==
- The Holocaust in Luxembourg
- History of the Jews in Luxembourg
