= Romani people in Luxembourg =

According to the European Commission, Approximately 300 Romani people live in Luxembourg (0.06% of the population).

Romani people in Luxembourg were arrested and sent to Auschwitz.

The Roma community in Luxembourg was included in Heinrich Himmler’s directive regarding Auschwitz. Although no existing records from that time remain, their existence in the camp was referenced during the Eichmann trial held in Jerusalem.

The first Roma appeared in Luxembourg in the 16th century. They faced challenges from newcomers hailing from Germany and France as they sought to maintain their trading territory. In 1603, a mercenary named Jean de la Fleur was tried for unlawfully entering the country in violation of a decree that prohibited Romani people from entering the Grand Duchy.

The Romani population in Luxembourg faces a significant vulnerability to human trafficking. Criminal networks systematically transport Romani children from adjacent nations during daylight hours to compel them into involuntary begging activities throughout Luxembourg.

== See also ==
- The Holocaust in Luxembourg
