= Paweł Silbert =

Paweł Jan Silbert
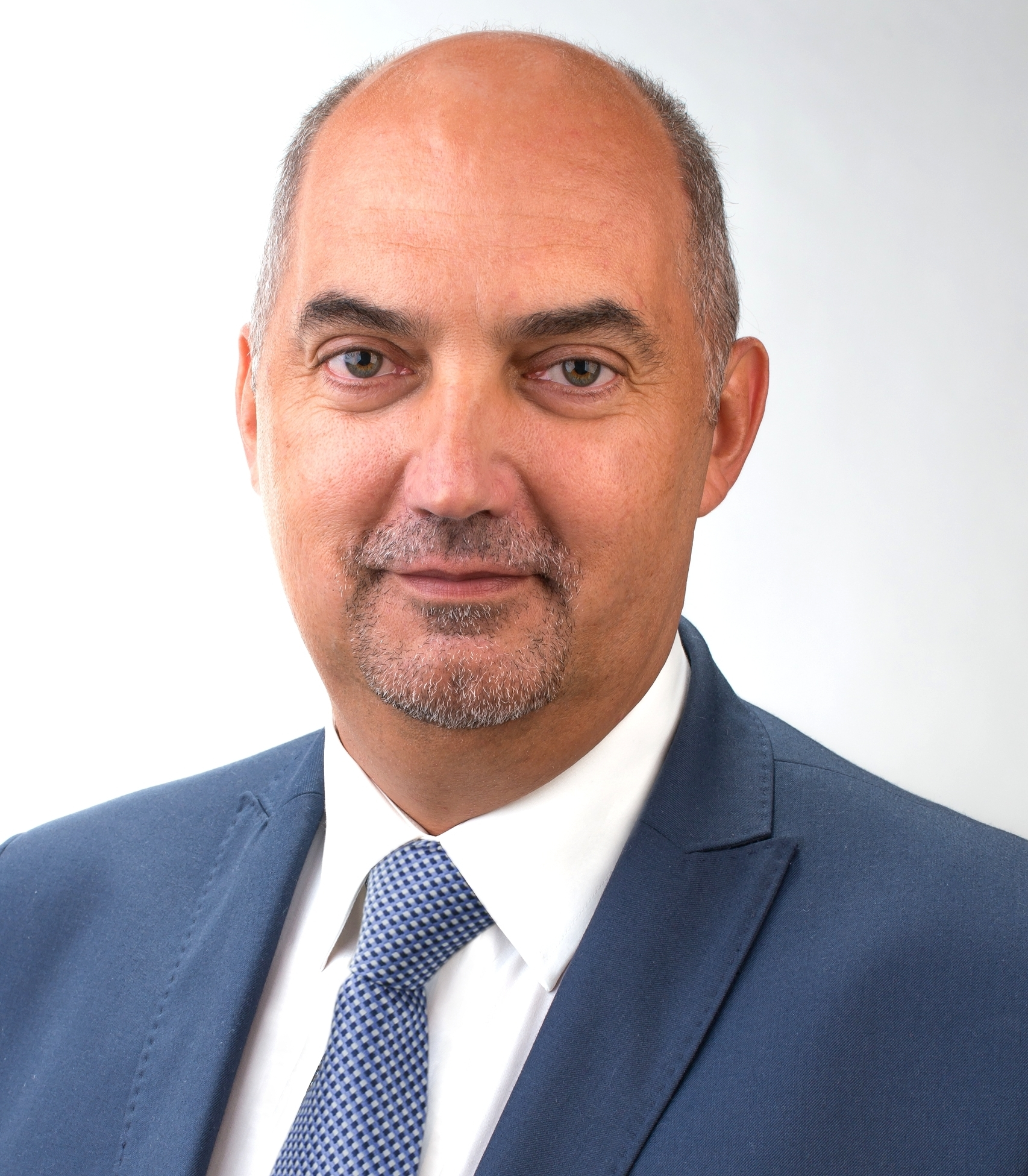

President of Jaworzno
- Incumbent
- Assumed office November 10, 2002

Personal details
- Born: 7 February 1962 (age 64) Kamienna Góra
- Party: Jaworzno Moje Miasto

Paweł Jan Silbert (born 7 February 1962) is a Polish politician serving as President of Jaworzno city since 2002. Member of city council from 1998 to 2002.

== Background ==
He earned a master's degree in Management and Marketing from the Higher School of Marketing Management and Foreign Languages in Katowice. He later completed postgraduate studies in European Union fund management at AGH University of Science and Technology in Kraków and in rhetoric at Jagiellonian University.

In the 90s, he has been involved in the democratic opposition as member of the Independent Workers' Union "Solidarity". In 1998 he was elected as a member of the city council of Jaworzno.

== President of Jaworzno ==
In first direct and free elections for President of Jaworzno, in 2002, Silbert was elected to the office. He fought in the elections against President of the city, Marian Tarabuła who was member of the Democratic Left Alliance. Silbert after becoming president won presidential elections in 2006, 2010, 2014 2018 and 2024. In 2010 elections and 2018 elections, he won in first round of voting.

He greeted in Jaworzno future Polish President and then presidential candidate for Polish President, Andrzej Duda and endorsed him, while criticizing his opponent, Bronisław Komorowski for supporting legislation that increased retirement age.
