= Shelomo Selinger =

Israeli-French sculptor

Shelomo Selinger שֶׁלֹמו שֵׁלִינְגֵר
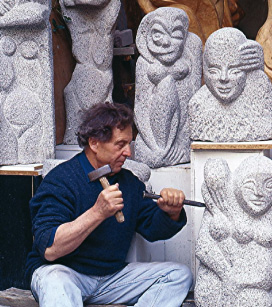
- Shelomo Selinger in his studio
- Born: 31 May 1928 (age 97); Szczakowa, Jaworzno, Poland
- Website: museum-selinger.net

Shelomo Selinger (Hebrew: שֶׁלֹמו שֵׁלִינְגֵר; born 31 May 1928) is a sculptor and artist living and working in Paris since 1956.

== Biography ==
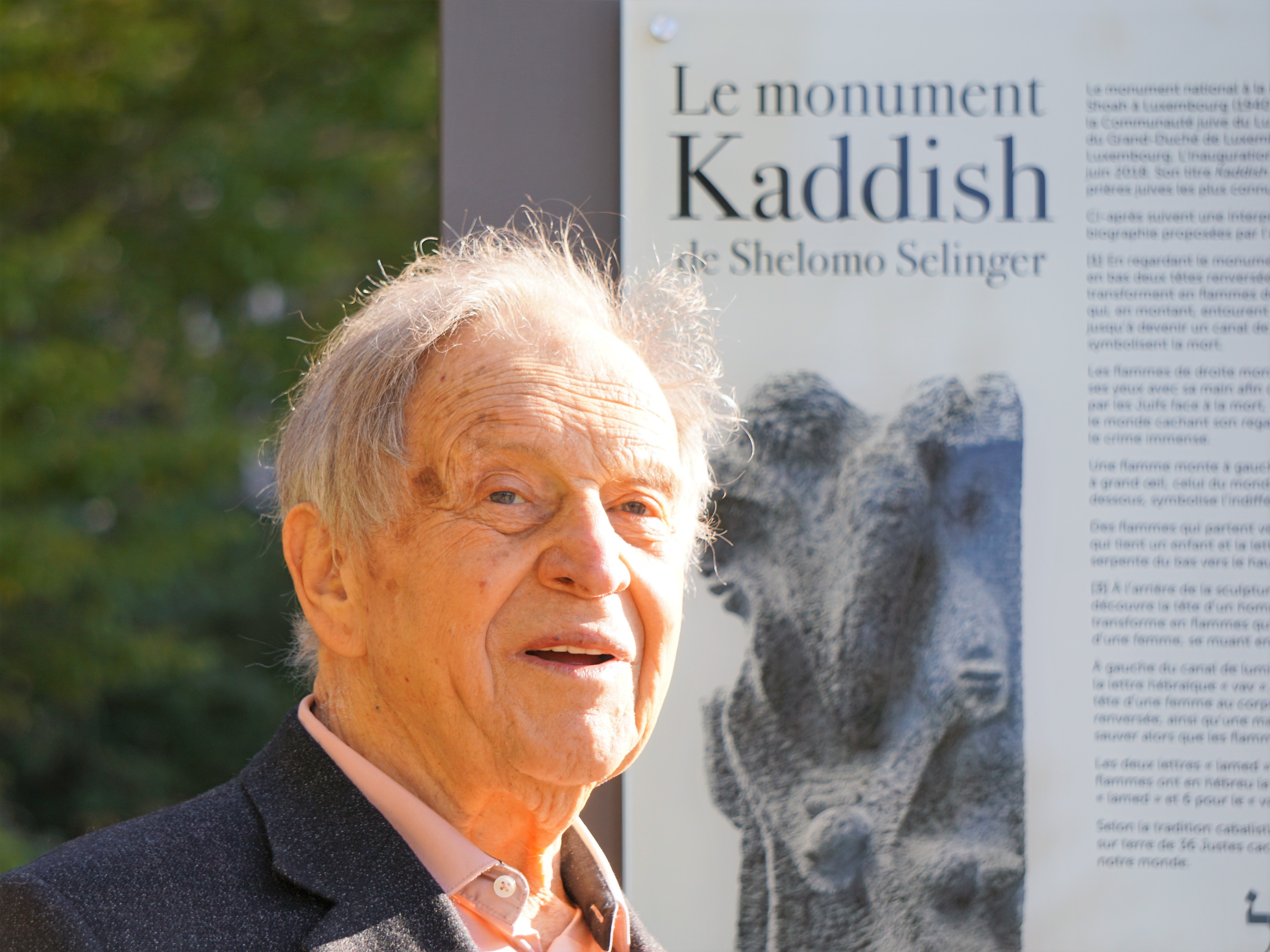
Selinger in 2021

Selinger was born to a Jewish family in the small Polish town of Szczakowa (today part of Jaworzno) near Oświęcim (Auschwitz). He received both a traditional Jewish upbringing and a Polish public school education. In 1943 he was deported with his father from the Chrzanów ghetto to the Faulbrück concentration camp in Germany. Three months later his father was murdered and Selinger remained alone in the camp. His mother and one of his sisters also perished during the Holocaust. Selinger survived nine German death camps: Faulbrück, Gröditz, Markstadt, Fünfteichen, Gross-Rosen, Flossenburg, Dresden, Leitmeritz and finally Theresienstadt, as well as two death marches.

He was discovered, still breathing, on a stack of dead bodies when the Terezin camp was liberated in 1945 by the Red Army. The Jewish military doctor who pulled him out of the pile of corpses transferred him to a military field hospital, where he recovered his health, but was completely amnesic for seven years.

In 1946 he boarded the Tel Haï, a ship leaving La Ciotat and headed to the then British Mandate Palestine with a group of young death camps survivors who, with the help of the Jewish Brigade of the British Army, had crossed illegally through Germany, Belgium and France. The ship was seized outside the territorial waters of Haifa by the British Royal Navy. The passengers, none of whom had immigration certificates, were interned in the Atlit detainee camp.

After his liberation from the camp, Selinger joined the Beit HaArava kibbutz near the Dead Sea. During the 1948 Palestine war he participated in the Sodom battle, while his kibbutz was destroyed. He was then one of the founders of the Kabri kibbutz in the Galilee, where in 1951 he met his future wife, Ruth Shapirovsky, who came to the kibbutz as a volunteer worker with her Haifa high school class. They were married in 1954. At that time Selinger began to fill in the gaps in his memory and to sculpt.

In 1955 Selinger was awarded the Norman Prize of the America-Israel Cultural Foundation. A year later he enrolled in Paris at the École nationale supérieure des Beaux-Arts where he studied traditional clay modelling with Marcel Gimond. However, he did not abandon his own personal style and continued carving directly on working materials with hammers, sledgehammers and chisels.

Too poor to buy his own art materials, Selinger hunted for stone blocks in the slum belt of Paris and returned with a very dense and hard bloc of granite capable of capturing and reflecting light. Granite became his favourite stone. Romanian sculptor Constantin Brâncuși introduced him to Vosges' sandstone ("Grès des Vosges") and gave him a grindstone of this reddish stone, a symbolic present to Selinger as a successor to Brâncuși's direct carving technique. Selinger also carved wood, mostly using easily available firewood.

After three years in the Beaux Arts school, Selinger started attending what he called the "best school of all", the museums of Paris (primarily the Louvre) and the studios of Parisian sculptors including Ossip Zadkine, Jean Arp, Alberto Giacometti and Joseph Constant. A sculpture named "Motherhood", inspired by his wife and the birth of their son Rami, earned him the Neumann Prize of the city of Geneva, the first acknowledgement of his talent in Paris. The work is now part of the permanent collection of the Musée d'Art Moderne de la Ville de Paris. Thus Selinger—a survivor of the German death camps—became a renowned sculptor of birth, rebirth and life itself.

The Jewish Museum of New York discovered Selinger in 1960 and displayed seven of his sculptures. After Paris art gallery owner Michel Dauberville became owner of his parents' gallery, the Galerie Galerie Bernheim-Jeune, he gave many exhibitions of Selinger's work from the 1960s through the first decade of the 21st century.

Further recognition came to Selinger in 1973 when he won first prize in an international competition with his monument "The Gates of Hell", in memory of those who passed through Drancy internment camp on the outskirts of Paris during World War II.

In 1973 Selinger was named Chevalier to the prestigious French Legion of Honour by President François Mitterrand. Since 2006, he has had the title "Officier de la Légion d'Honneur".

Currently living in Paris with his wife, Selinger contributes to work in marble, granite, stone and wood.

== Citations ==
My partners in creation are matter and light. Every stone has its own specific personality and this has to be respected. I contemplate for a long time before I discover the dormant form inside. My task is to bring the form to light. The transition from shadow to light is the secret of sculpting. In my wood sculptures I follow the natural forms of the wood and I try to bring forth a shape that can enable light to burst forth. I am amazed time and again at how the very structure of my piece of wood, its veins and its fibres, take control of my creation. I carve directly in stone. My tools are my hammer, my chisel and my hands. I think they are perfect for conveying and reflecting my feelings. I have never used machinery. Machines follow their own pattern and their rhythm is too fast. My unquenchable thirst for freedom, as well as my quest for light, a consequence of my life in the camps, are ever-present in my work. The technique of direct hand carving in stone or wood is an everlasting remainder and reminder of my time as a prisoner digging a tunnel to freedom. The prisoner, who drills, bores and excavates, hopes to be free once his tunnel is finished and the light at the end of it is revealed. In truth he is neither free before, neither during his digging nor after his escape. My salvation is in the very act of digging and carving. Once I finish a piece I start a new one immediately. I am never short of inspiration nor of a subject.

== Major works ==
Selinger's work on the Mémorial national des Déportés de France (French National Deportation Memorial) in Drancy, in rose coloured granite, took two years of carving by hand and was unveiled in 1976. The Mémorial de la Résistance in La Courneuve followed in 1987. In the meantime Selinger created the Requiem pour les Juifs d'Allemagne (Requiem for German Jews) (1980) in Bosen, Saarland and the Monument aux Justes parmi les Nations (Monument for the Unknown Righteous among the Nations) at Yad Vashem in Jerusalem(1987). Selinger started treating monumental statuary in open space in 1964 with his sculpture L'Esprit et la matière n° 1 (Spirit and matter n° 1), erected in Saint-Avold (Moselle), followed by L'Esprit et la matière n° 2 in Wissembourg (Bas-Rhin). The superb white marble Moise ou la Victoire de la lumière (Moses or the Victory of Light), set up in Aranđelovac (Serbia) has kept its head but the prophet's rays were destroyed by lightning.

Some of his other important open-air monuments are La tauromachie at the bullring of Le Bouscat (Gironde) in 1974, La Danse, a group of 35 flower boxes created in 1982, stretching from the place Basse of the Esplanade Charles-de-Gaulle, to the La Défense (Hauts-de-Seine), covering an area of 3.600 square meters and the Groupe de 13 sculptures (1991) in the Tel-Hai Industrial park in the Galilee, a part of the 24 granite and basalt sculptures bought by the Open Air Museum of Tefen. These works are on display in Tel-Aviv, in Omer or in Lavon. Since 1998, Le prophète Elie (The Prophet Elijah) towers over the Mount Carmel dominating Haifa.

Selinger's sculptures comprise today more than 800 works in all possible materials and sizes, granite, red granite, sandstone, marble, bronze, oak, blackwood, cherry wood, ash tree or beech. Forty-eight monumental open-air statues are exhibited in public places. Five of these monuments are dedicated to The Holocaust and the Résistance.

On the 103rd anniversary of the 1906 rehabilitation of Alfred Dreyfus, the first deputy mayor of Paris, Anne Hidalgo, announced the creation of a new association. The association proposes to launch a national subscription campaign for the erection of a statue of Émile Zola on the Place Alfred Dreyfus in the 15th arrondissement of Paris. The sculptor will be Shelomo Selinger.

Selinger's graphic works in Indian ink and/or charcoal number thousands. Part of his drawings represents his concentration camp experience, but most of his works are real celebrations of life. Shelomo Selinger's works were exhibited in about forty museums and galleries all over the world.

== Prizes and distinctions ==
- 1956 – Norman Prize for sculpture, America-Israel. Israel.
- 1958 – Neumann Prize for Jewish artists in Europe.
- 1973 – First Prize in the international competition for the national monument in memory of the camp at Drancy.
- 1974 – Silver Medal of the town of Montrouge.
- 1983 – Silver Medal of the town of Paris.
- 1985 – First Grand Prix at the Salon d'Automne. Paris.
- 1989 – Vermeil medal of the city of Paris
- 1991 – Prize of Yiddish journalists in Paris.
- 1993 – Chevalier de la Légion d'Honneur. Paris
- 1993 – Mémoire de la Shoah Prize, Fondation Buchman, Fondation of French Judaïsme.
- 1994 – Chevalier des Arts et des Lettres. Paris
- 1994 – Peace Prize. Republic of China.
- 1996 – Korman Prize from the Union des Associations Juives de France.
- 2005 – Officier de la Légion d'Honneur.

== Bibliography ==
- L'HOMME BLANC RACONTE SON HISTOIRE, Drawings by S.Selinger. Text by Bruno. Durocher. Paris. Edition Caractère. 1981
- Israel, Drawings by S. Selinger. Poems by David Escobar Galindo. San – Salvador. 1981
- HISTOIRE DE LA SCULPTURE MODERNE EN FRANCE DE 1950 A NOS JOURS. Lionel Jianou. Paris, Arte Edition d'art. 1982
- SET ER- HA-SETARIM, Woodcuts by Shelomo Selinger. Text by Bruno Durocher. Paris. Edition Durocher. 1986
- LE MEMORIAL NATIONAL DU CAMP DE DRANCY, Brochure published by the municipality of Drancy. 1990
- UNE ECOLE DE BATIMENT A AUSCHWITZ, Drawings by S.Selinger. Text by Charles Papiernik. Paris. Edition Caractère.1993 Buenos aires. Argentina, (in Spanish). Edition Milà. 1994
- ETRANGER, Woodcuts by Shelomo Selinger. Poetry by Bruno Durocher. Paris. Edition Caractère. 1994
- L'UNIVERS DU SCULPTEUR SHELOMO SELINGER, Text by Marie-Françoise Bonicel. Biography by Ruth Selinger. Paris. Edition F.Ferre.1998.
- Text of the speech made by François Mitterrand when awarding the artist the Légion d'Honneur.
- Shelomo Selinger, Sculptures in the Open Museum Collection. 2000. Tefen, Open Museum. Israel
- Shelomo Selinger Survivor of the Shoah. Video cassettes, Visual History Foundation. 1996
- Shelomo Selinger. The Death Camps - Drawings by a Survivor (in French). Text by Marie-Françoise Bonicel and Ruth Shapirovsky-Selinger.

Paris. Somogy Edition d'Art. 2005.

== Gallery ==
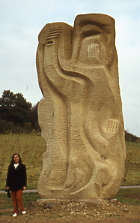
Requiem pour les Juifs d'Allemagne 1980, Bosen

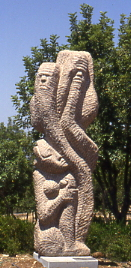
Monument aux Justes parmi les Nations, Yad Vashem, Jerusalem

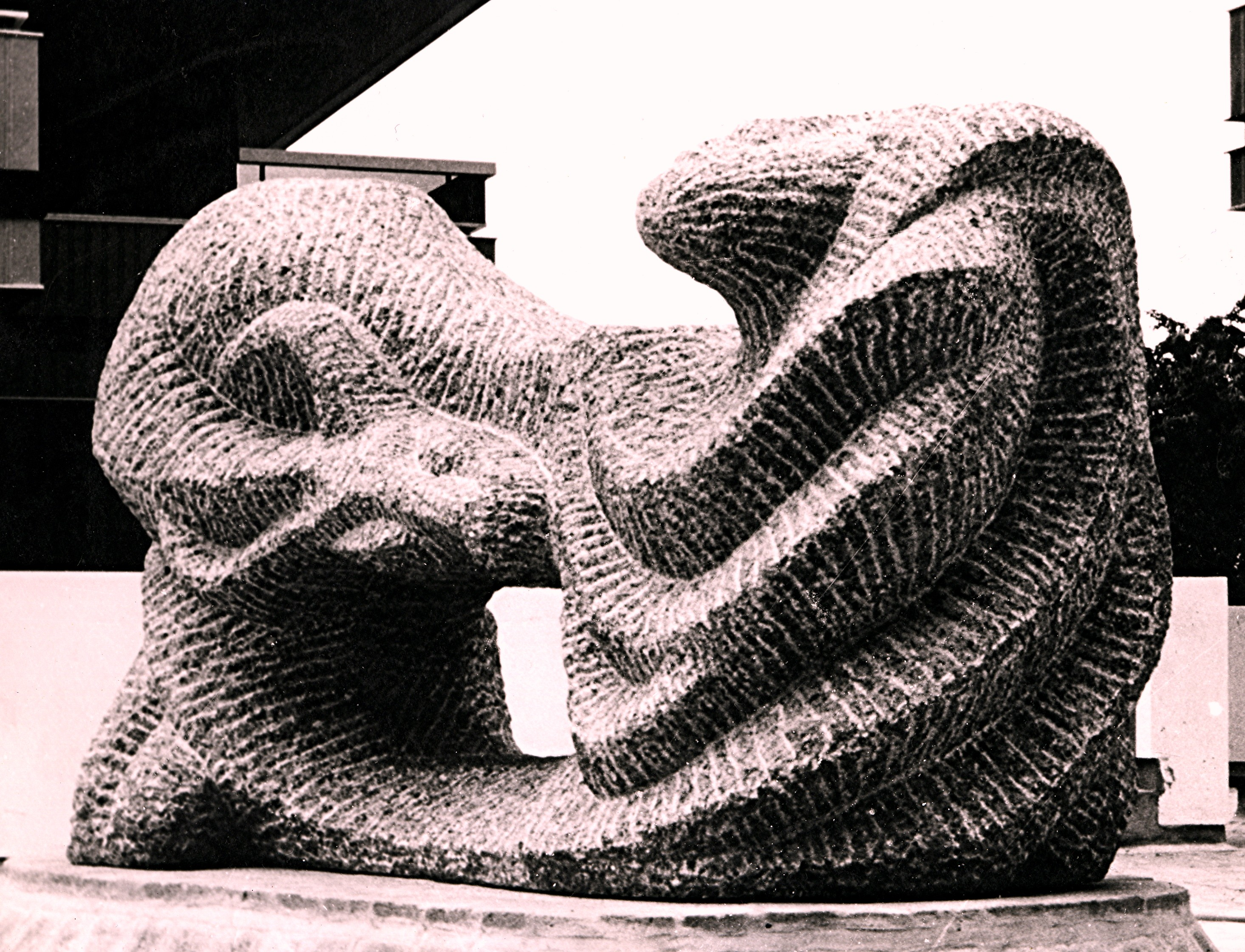
La Tauromachie, Arènes du Bouscat, Bordeaux

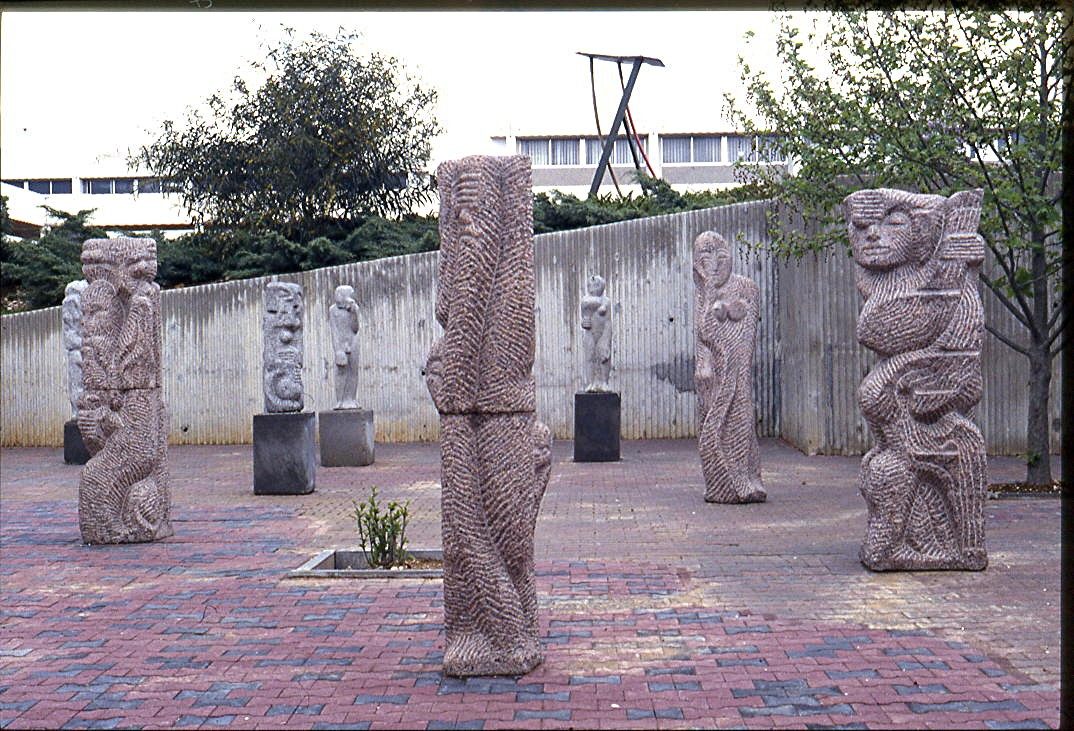
Exhibit in Tefen Industrial Park, Israel

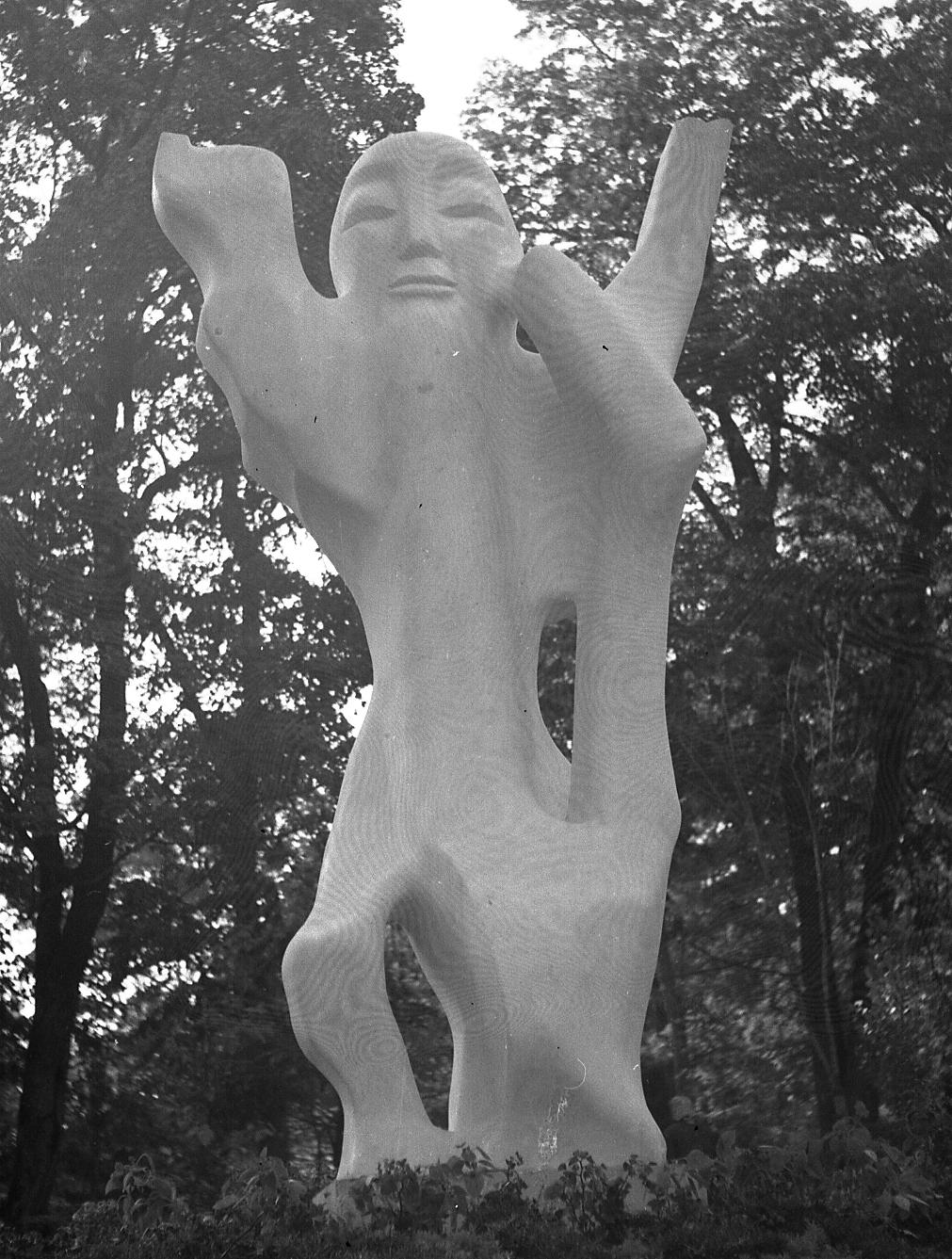
Moïse ou la victoire de la lumière, marbre blanc, Arandjelovac

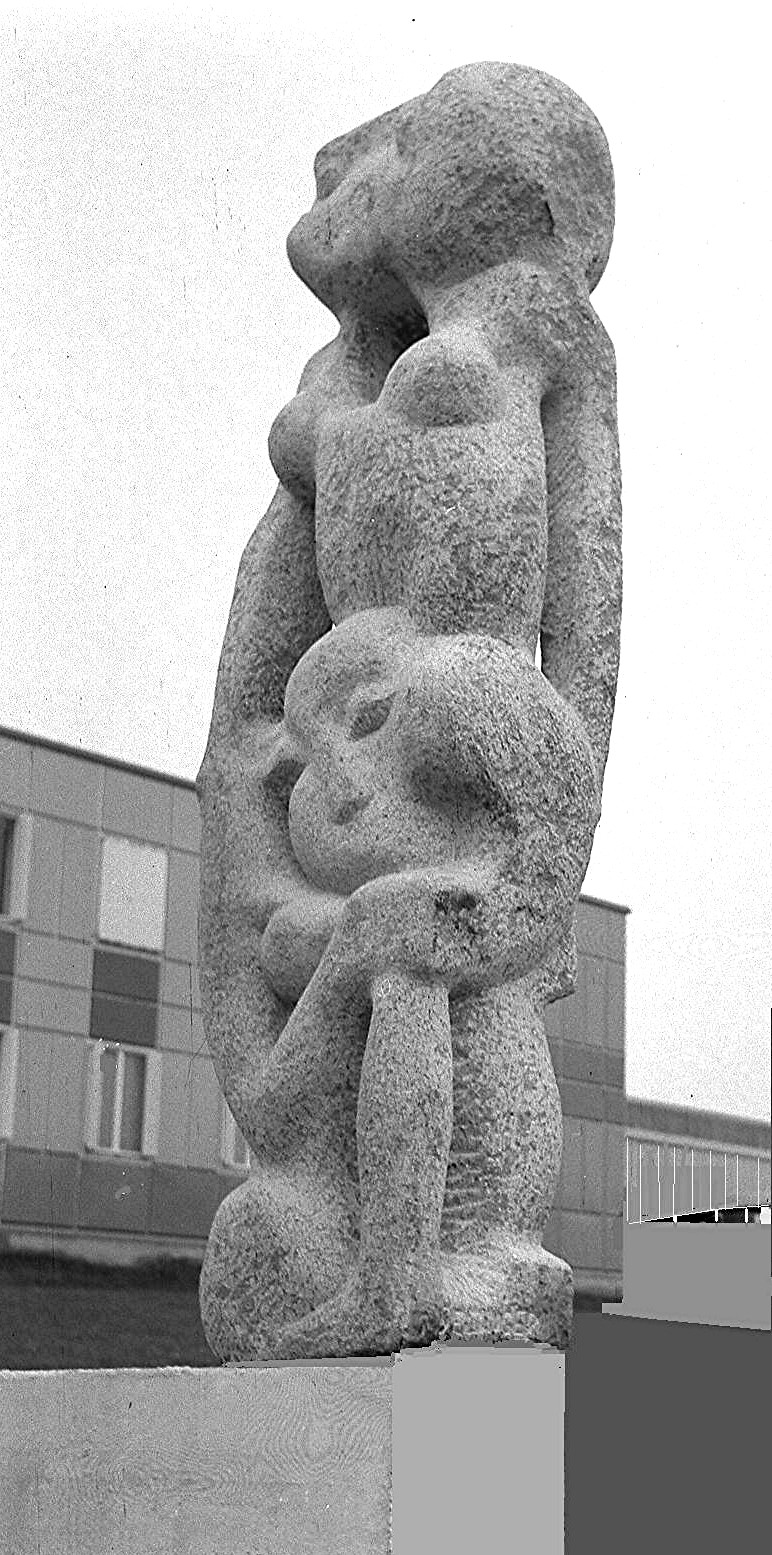
L'esprit de la matière N°2 Wissembourg.

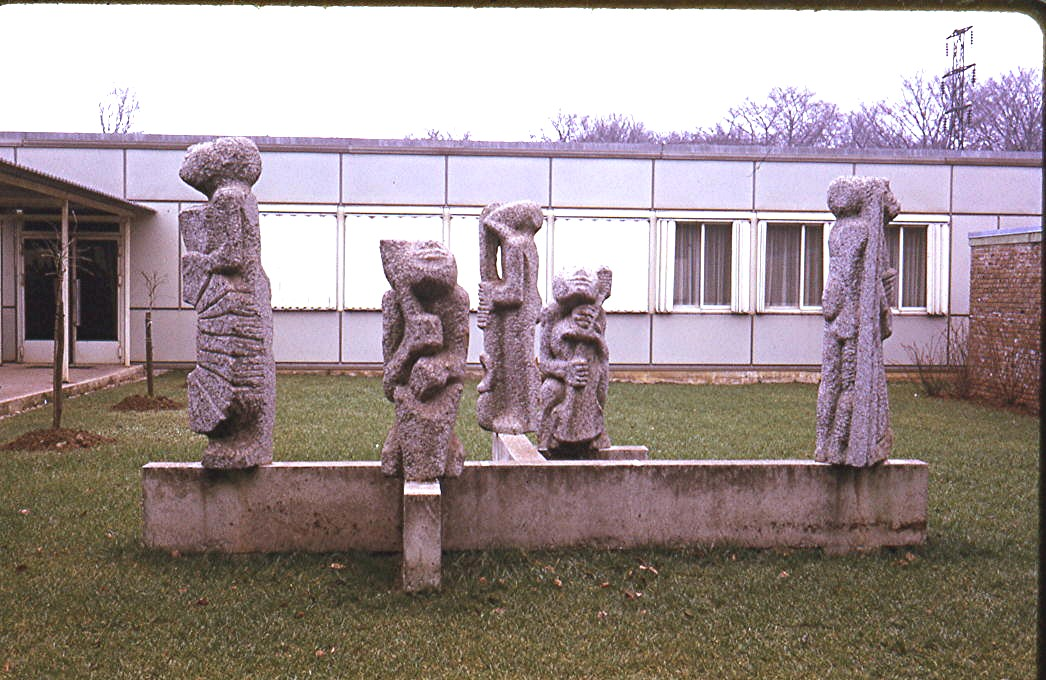
Cinq musiciens, Hayange

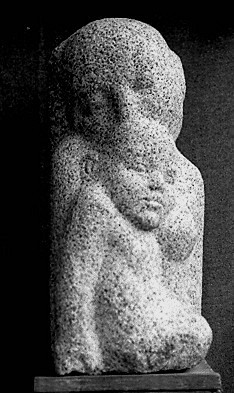
Maternité, Musée d'art moderne de la Ville de Paris

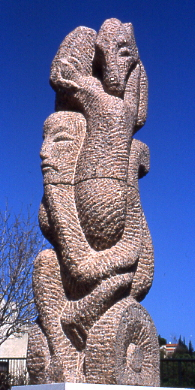
Le prophète Elie, Mount Carmel, Haifa, Israël

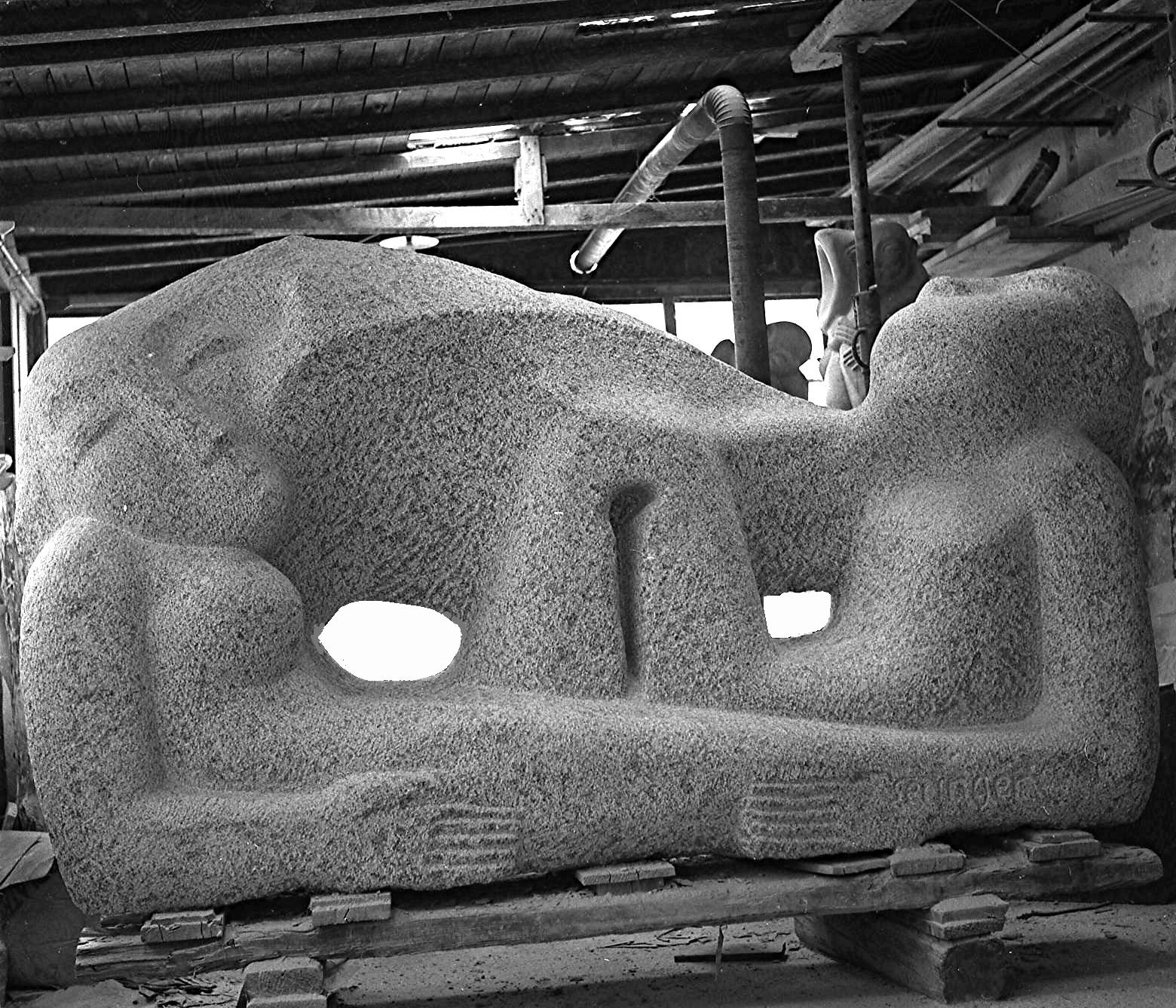
L'esprit de la matière N°1, Saint-Avold

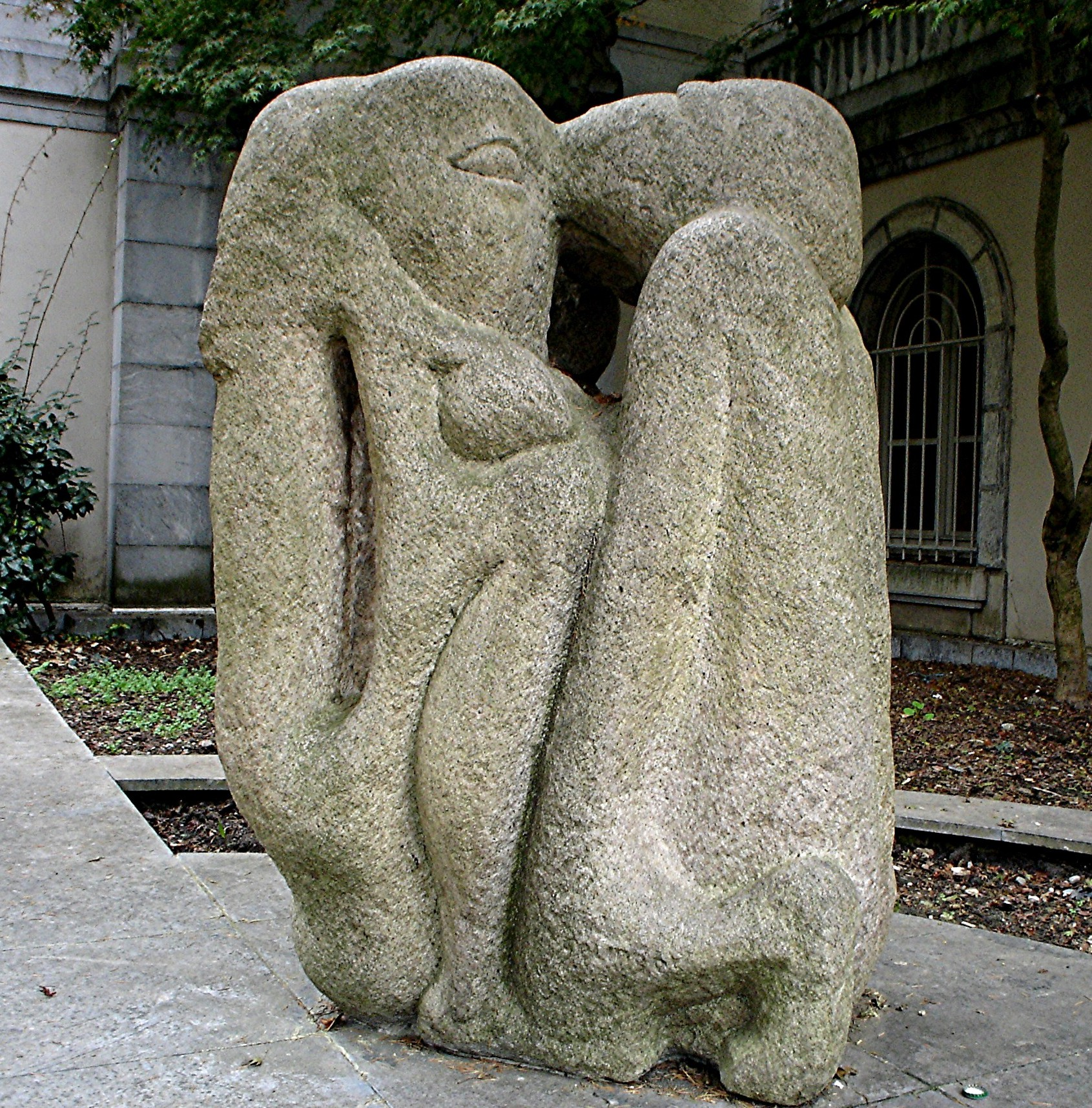
Le regard, Tarbes, Hautes-Pyrénées

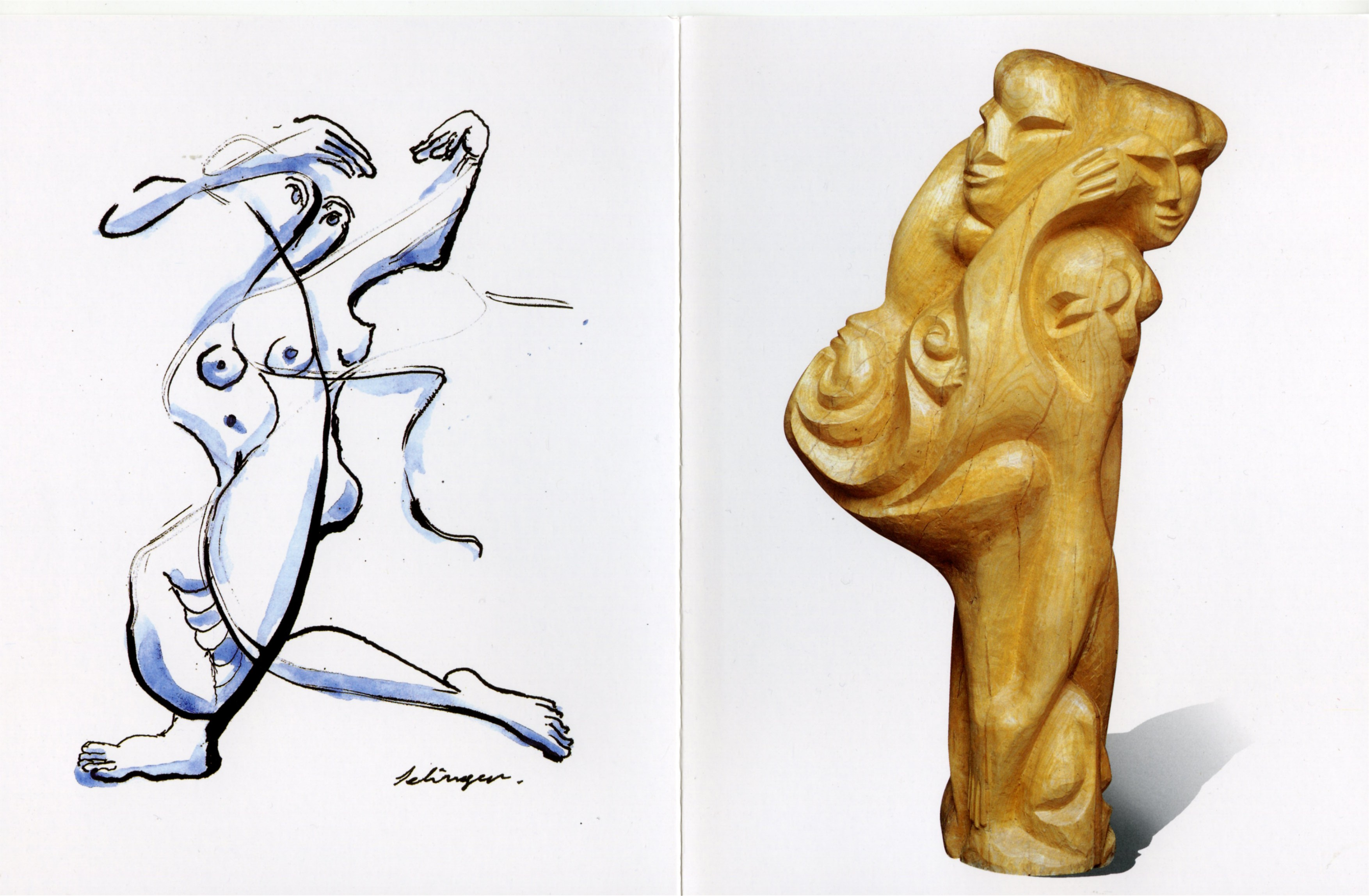
L'arbre de vie (bois) et La danse (encre de Chine)

== Filmography ==
- Shelomo Selinger : Mémoire de pierre, 77 minutes, French w/English subtitles, Directed by Alain Bellaïche (), 2010.
- Les sept portes de Shelomo Selinger (, 2012.
