= Israel–Luxembourg relations =

- Israel: Luxembourg

Israel–Luxembourg relations are the bilateral relations of Israel and Luxembourg.

Both Israel and Luxembourg do not have embassies in each other's countries. Israel is represented in Luxembourg via its embassy in Brussels. Luxembourg is represented in Israel by the embassy of the Netherlands and the embassy of Belgium for consular service. Luxembourg also has a trade and investment Office in Tel Aviv.

== History ==
Luxembourg was among the 33 countries that voted in favor of the Partition Plan on 29 November 1947. Israel and Luxembourg established relations on November 1950. The Reparations Agreement between Israel and the Federal Republic of Germany was signed in Luxembourg on 10 September 1952. In February 1985, the President of Israel, Haim Herzog, visited Luxembourg. In May 1987, the Grand Duke Jean and Grand Duchess Joséphine-Charlotte of Luxembourg made an historic visit to Israel. During their stay, they visited Yad Vashem memorial, and the Diaspora Museum, where they were given a history of the Jewish community of Luxembourg. On the 13 of December 2004 Israel and Luxembourg have signed on an Avoidance of Double Taxation Agreement.

In 2019, Luxembourg’s former prime minister Xavier Bettel decided to boycott the farewell dinner for the Israeli ambassador as a mean of protest against the former Education Minister of Israel, Rafi Peretz, who commented against conversion therapy. The boycott of Bettel was criticized by the former Justice Minister of Israel, Amir Ohana, as Ohana wrote that the comment of Rafi Peretz was widely denounced and strongly condemned, including Prime Minister Benjamin Netanyahu. Ohana also mentioned that Bettel had no problem to shake hands with Iranian Foreign Minister Mohammed Javad Zarif.

In 2019, the former Foreign Minister of Luxembourg Jean Asselborn pushed other European countries to unilaterally recognize Palestine. In August 2020 Luxemburg was the only EU country to criticize the Abraham Accords, as the former Foreign Minister of Luxembourg Jean Asselborn claimed that the normalization between Israel and the United Arab Emirates constitutes the abandonment of the Palestinian people by the United Arab Emirates.

In 2024, the Foreign Minister of Luxembourg Xavier Bettel considered opening an embassy in Tel Aviv, and later that year Bettel had a working visit with both Israel and the Palestinian Authority.

== Trade ==
Trade between Israel and Luxemburg is influenced by the EU-Israel Free Trade Agreement of 1995.

Israel - Luxemburg trade in millions USD-$
	Israel imports Luxemburg exports	Luxemburg imports Israel exports	Total trade value
2023	141	48.7	189.7
2022	187	42.9	229.9
2021	166.3	19.9	186.2
2020	189.6	21.7	211.3
2019	141.6	12.6	154.2
2018	180.9	16.7	197.6
2017	178.8	17.3	196.1
2016	152.7	19.4	172.1
2015	195.3	22.2	217.5
2014	223.9	22.3	246.2
2013	242.3	20	262.3
2012	181.2	14.8	196
2011	219.8	13	232.8
2010	185	14.3	199.3
2009	117	10.8	127.8
2008	174	20.4	194.4
2007	91.9	15.3	107.2
2006	46.5	8.8	55.3
2005	30.5	11	41.5
2004	21	8.6	29.6
2003	29.7	4.3	34
2002	28.6	3.5	32.1

== See also ==
- Foreign relations of Israel
- Foreign relations of Luxembourg
- History of the Jews in Luxembourg
