= Jaworzno =

- City county
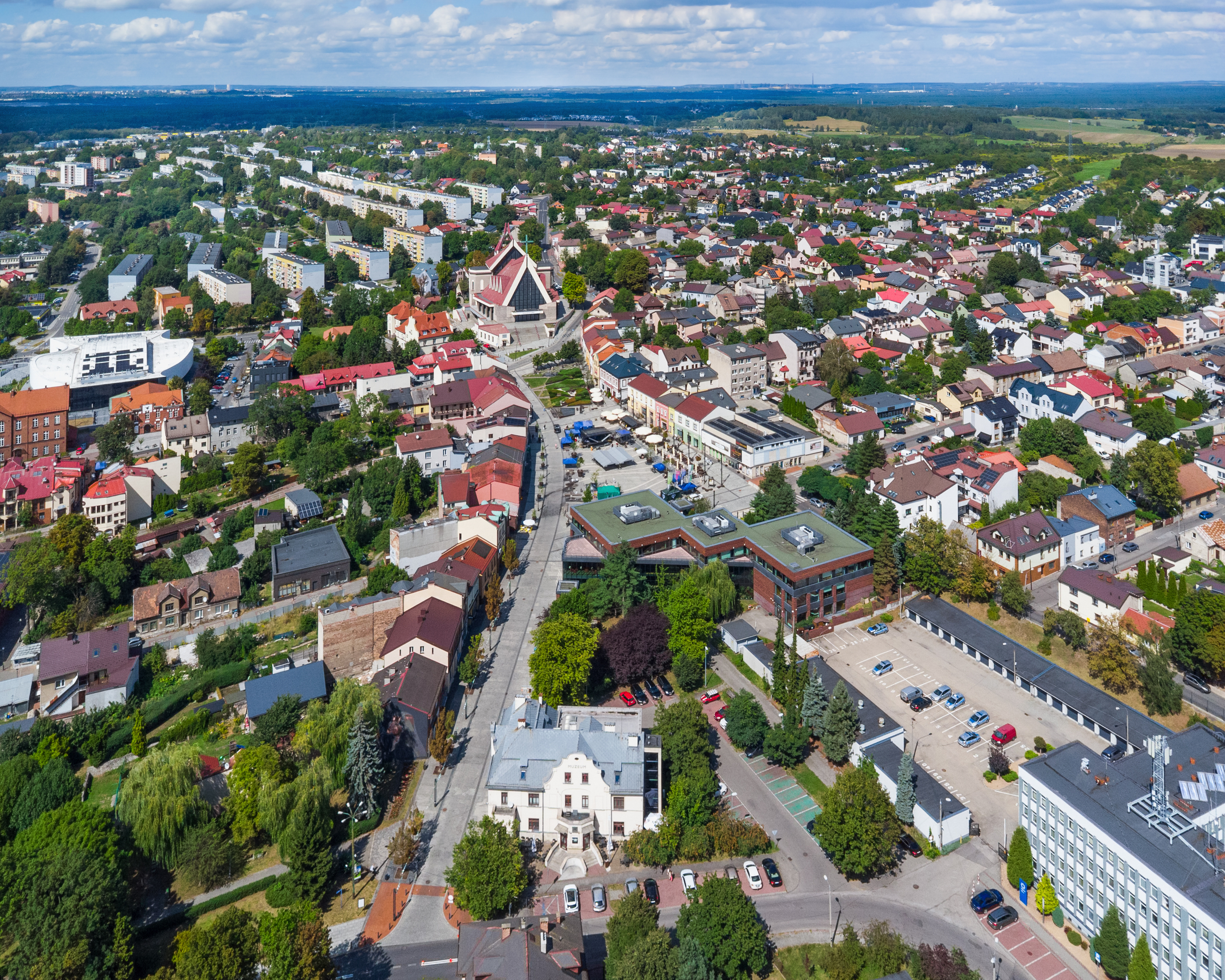
- Aerial view of Śródmieście

- Flag Coat of arms
- Motto(s): Jaworzno – źródło energii. Jaworzno – the source of energy
- Location within Poland
- Coordinates: 50°12′16″N 19°16′12″E
- Country: Poland
- Voivodeship: Silesian
- County: county
- Established: 1229
- City rights: 1901

Government
  - country mayor: Paweł Silbert

Area
  - Total: 153 km^{2} (59 sq mi)

Population (31 December 2021)
  - Total: 89,350 ▼
- Time zone: UTC+1 (CET)
  - Summer (DST): UTC+2 (CEST)
- Postal code: 43–600 to 43–618
- Area code: +48 32
- Car plates: SJ
- Website: http://www.jaworzno.pl/

Jaworzno [jaˈvɔʐnɔ] is a city county in southern Poland in the Silesian Voivodeship, near Katowice. It lies in the Silesian Highlands, on the Przemsza river (a tributary of the Vistula). Jaworzno belongs to Lesser Poland and, despite belonging to the Silesian Voivodeship since 1999, Jaworzno is not part of Silesia. Jaworzno is one of the cities of the 2.7 million conurbation – Katowice urban area and within a more significant Katowice-Ostrava metropolitan area populated by about 5,294,000 people. The population of the city is 89,350 (2021).

== Geography ==
=== Location ===
The municipality is situated a short distance to the north-east of Junction 41 on the A4 Highway. It lies in the Silesian Highlands, in the historical region of Lesser Poland, and since its foundation until 1975, it was administratively tied with Lesser Poland's capital, Kraków. Until 1795, it belonged to Kraków Voivodeship, then, together with Kraków, was seized by the Habsburg Empire in the Partitions of Poland. In 1815–1846, it belonged to the Free City of Kraków, which was annexed by Austria and merged with Kingdom of Galicia and Lodomeria. In 1918, Jaworzno returned to Poland. The name of the city comes from the jawor trees (sycamore maple), which in the past were abundant in this area.

=== Administrative position ===
Jaworzno was placed into the Silesian Voivodeship (province) effective January 1, 1999, under the Local Government Reorganization Act. Previously, it was attached to the Katowice Voivodeship (1975–1998) and before that to the Kraków Voivodeship. Jaworzno lies in the east of the largest metropolis in Poland and one of the largest in the European Union, numbering about 3,5 million. This urban expansion bloomed in the 19th century thanks to the rapid development of the mining and metallurgical industries. In 2006, Jaworzno and 14 neighboring cities formed a multimunicipal structure, the Upper Silesian Metropolitan Union. Its population was 2 million and its area was 1,304 square kilometres (503 sq mi). In 2016 Jaworzno left the Union, and in 2017 refused to join the Metropolis GZM (which eventually superseded the Union), mainly due to concerns about public transport quality.

Upper Silesian Metropolitan Union

=== Climate ===
The climate of the area is continental and humid. The annual average temperature is 8 °C (46 °F) (January average −1.7 °C (28.9 °F) and July average 17.7 °C (63.9 °F) °C). Yearly rainfall averages at 750 mm (29.5 in), the rainiest month being July. The area's characteristic weak winds blow at about 2 m/s from the west (Moravian Gate).

=== Transport ===
- Routes

Jaworzno is located at the intersection of several road routes such as the A4 motorway (part of European route E40), the S1 expressway which is connected with the A1 motorway (both forming part of the European route E75), the National road No. 79 (Warsaw–Bytom), and Voivodeship road 903.

- Public transport

Public transport is provided by PKM Jaworzno (Przedsiębiorstwo Komunikacji Miejskiej w Jaworznie – public transport company in Jaworzno), not belonging to the KZK GOP. PKM Jaworzno was one of the first public transport companies in Poland that introduced the magnetic card called Jaworznicka Karta miejska (Jaworzno Urban Card) instead of paper tickets. Currently, PKM Jaworzno is one of the most modern public transport companies in Poland. The PKM Jaworzno's fleet is based 40% on electric vehicles.

=== Districts and housing estates ===
Districts of Jaworzno

- Bory
- Byczyna
- Cezarówka
- Ciężkowice
- Dąbrowa Narodowa
- Długoszyn
- Dobra
- Gigant
- Góra Piasku
- Jeleń
- Jeziorki
- Koźmin
- Niedzieliska
- Pieczyska
- Siłownia
- Podwale
- Stara Huta
- Stare Miasto (Old City)
- Szczakowa
- Śródmieście (Downtown)
- Wilkoszyn
- Wysoki Brzeg
- Osiedle Stałe
- Osiedle Awaryjne
- Osiedle Cegielniana
- Osiedle Chrząstówka
- Osiedle Energetyków
- Osiedle Gagarina
- Osiedle Górnicze
- Osiedle Kościuszki
- Osiedle Warpie
- Osiedle Leopold
- Osiedle Łubowiec
- Osiedle Pańska Góra
- Osiedle Podłęże
- Osiedle Skałka
- Osiedle Pszczelnik
- Osiedle Sobieski

== History ==
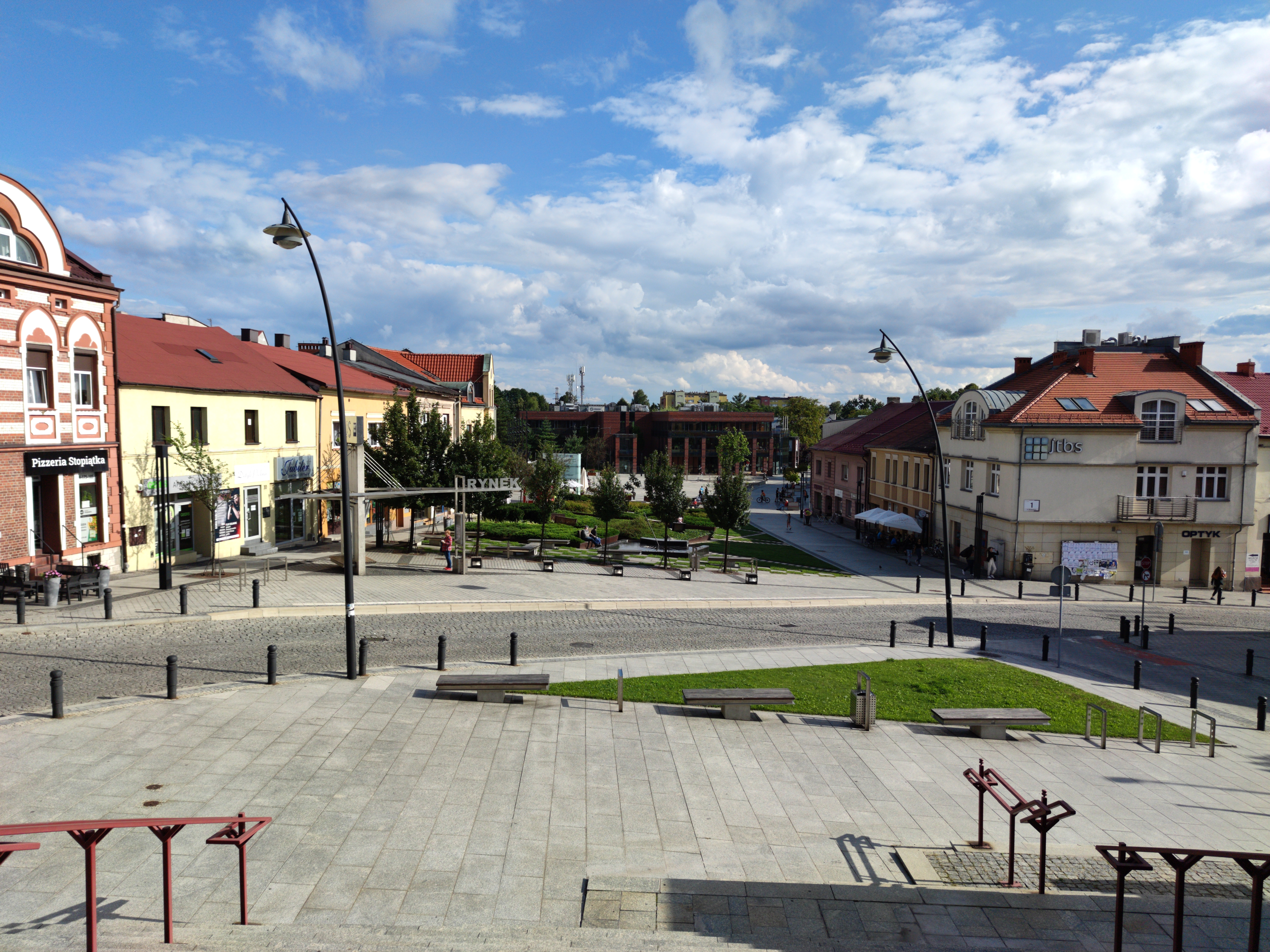
Rynek ("Market Square") in Jaworzno

In the Middle Ages, a gord was established on the Grodzisko hill, traces of which can still be found. The first known mention of Jaworzno comes from 1229, and in 1335, a parish church of St. Wojciech existed here. Jaworzno remained a small village, located in western Lesser Poland, near the much larger and more important town of Chrzanów. From 1179, the nearby Przemsza river marked the border between Lesser Poland and Silesia. It also became a state border of Poland until 1922. The area of Jaworzno was originally under the rule of the bishops of Kraków. After Austria seized Silesia at the end of the 17th century, several coal mines were developed near Jaworzno. In the 18th century, silver, lead, iron, and zinc deposits were found here. In 1767, the first coal mine in the Polish–Lithuanian Commonwealth was opened in Szczakowa.

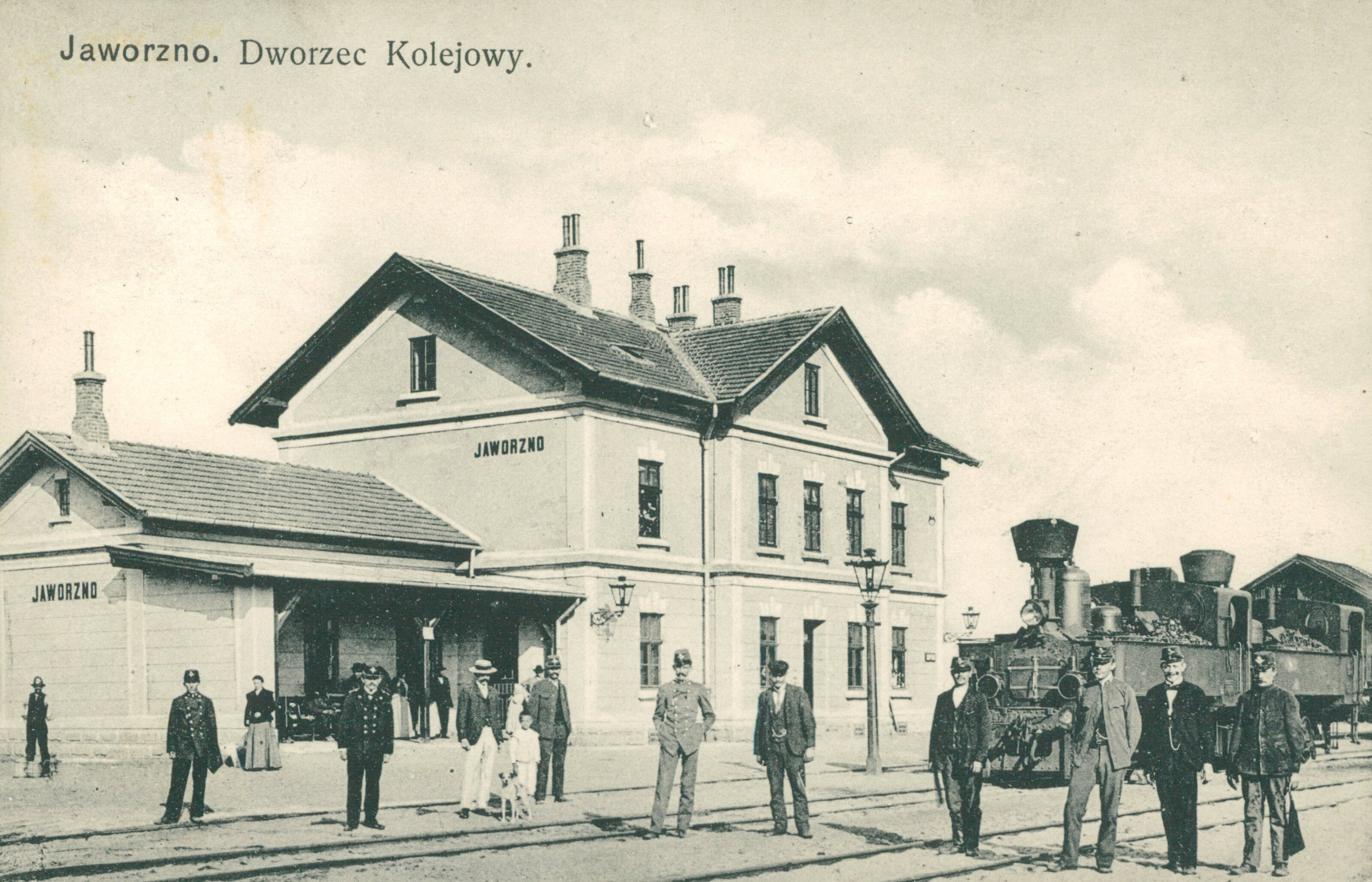
Early 20th-century view of the train station

After the Partitions of Poland, Jaworzno belonged to the Habsburg Empire, in 1809 – 1815 it was part of the Duchy of Warsaw, and in 1815–1846, it belonged to the Free City of Krakow, which in 1846 was annexed by the Austrian Empire; Jaworzno remained in Austrian Galicia until November 1918. In the 19th century, the village became famous for the so-called Three Emperors' Corner, where the borders of three powers met (German Empire, Russian Empire, and Austria-Hungary). In 1847, a new railway line connected Jaworzno's Szczakowa district with Kraków and Prussian Upper Silesia. From 1854 until 1867 it was the center of a district (Bezirk) (within Kreis Krakau until 1865); in 1867 it became part of Chrzanów district (German: Bezirk Chrzanów, Polish: Powiat chrzanowski). The village became a center of industrialization. A power plant was opened in 1898, and Jaworzno's coal mines extracted 84% of Galician coal. Several new factories were established here in the late 19th and early 20th centuries. As a result, on September 21, 1901, Emperor Franz Joseph I granted a town charter to Jaworzno.

Following World War I, in 1918, Poland regained independence and control of the town. In the Second Polish Republic, Jaworzno belonged to Chrzanów County and the Kraków Voivodeship, in which it also remained after the war, until 1975.

Following the joint German-Soviet invasion of Poland, which started World War II in September 1939, the town was occupied by Germany. It was among the areas annexed to East Upper Silesia during the war. Under German rule it was renamed Arnshalde. The Germans operated several forced labour camps in the town, including a Nazi prison/forced labour camp, a subcamp of the Auschwitz concentration camp mostly for Jews and Poles, the E596 subcamp of the Stalag VIII-B/344 prisoner-of-war camp for Western Allied POWs at the Jan Kanty Coal Mine (under occupation named Dachsgrube), and the E561, E563 and E732 subcamps of Stalag VIII-B/344, located at a local railway depot, at the Sobieski Coal Mine (then renamed Robertsgrube) and in the present-day district of Szczakowa, respectively. On 6 December 1943, the SS committed a massacre of 19 prisoners at the subcamp of Auschwitz, as punishment following an unsuccessful escape attempt.

After the war, the town was restored to Poland, although with a Soviet-installed communist regime, which stayed in power until the Fall of Communism in the 1980s. The communists converted the former Nazi German subcamp of Auschwitz into the Central Labour Camp Jaworzno. In the People's Republic of Poland, Jaworzno developed as an important center of industry. Its population quickly grew when thousands of migrants came here in search of work at coal mines, power plants, and other factories. Furthermore, several villages were integrated with Jaworzno. As a result, Jaworzno's area reaches 152 square kilometres (59 sq mi). In 1975, the city became part of Katowice Voivodeship. Although most towns of pre-1975 Chrzanów County returned to Lesser Poland, Jaworzno was attached to the Silesian Voivodeship in 1999.

== Environment ==
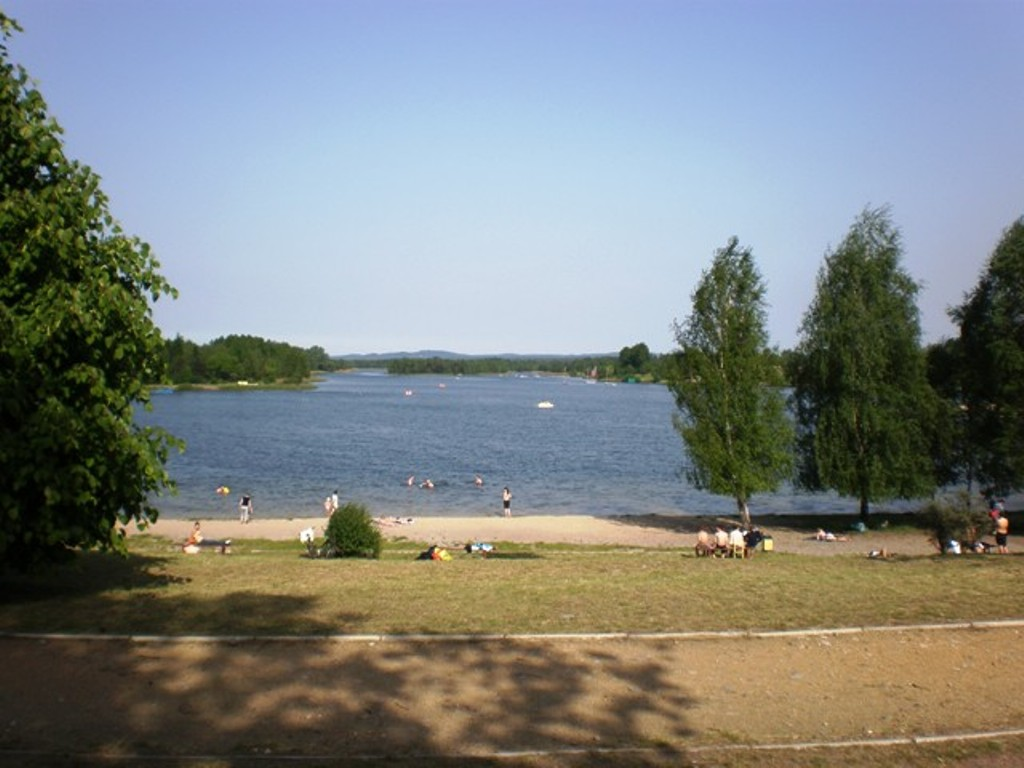
Sosina artificial lake

Greens, forests, and undeveloped land constitute 60 percent of the town's area. Jaworzno has environmentally valuable areas which, as a group, present a diversity of landscapes and vegetation as well as a richness of flora and fauna. These include the Dolina Zabnika Nature Reserve, the Dobra Wilkoszyn landscape protection area, the Sasanka Natural Surface Monument, Grodzisko Hill, and Sosina Lake. Within Jaworzno's boundaries, there are 41 plant species under strict protection and 11 under partial protection.

== Media ==
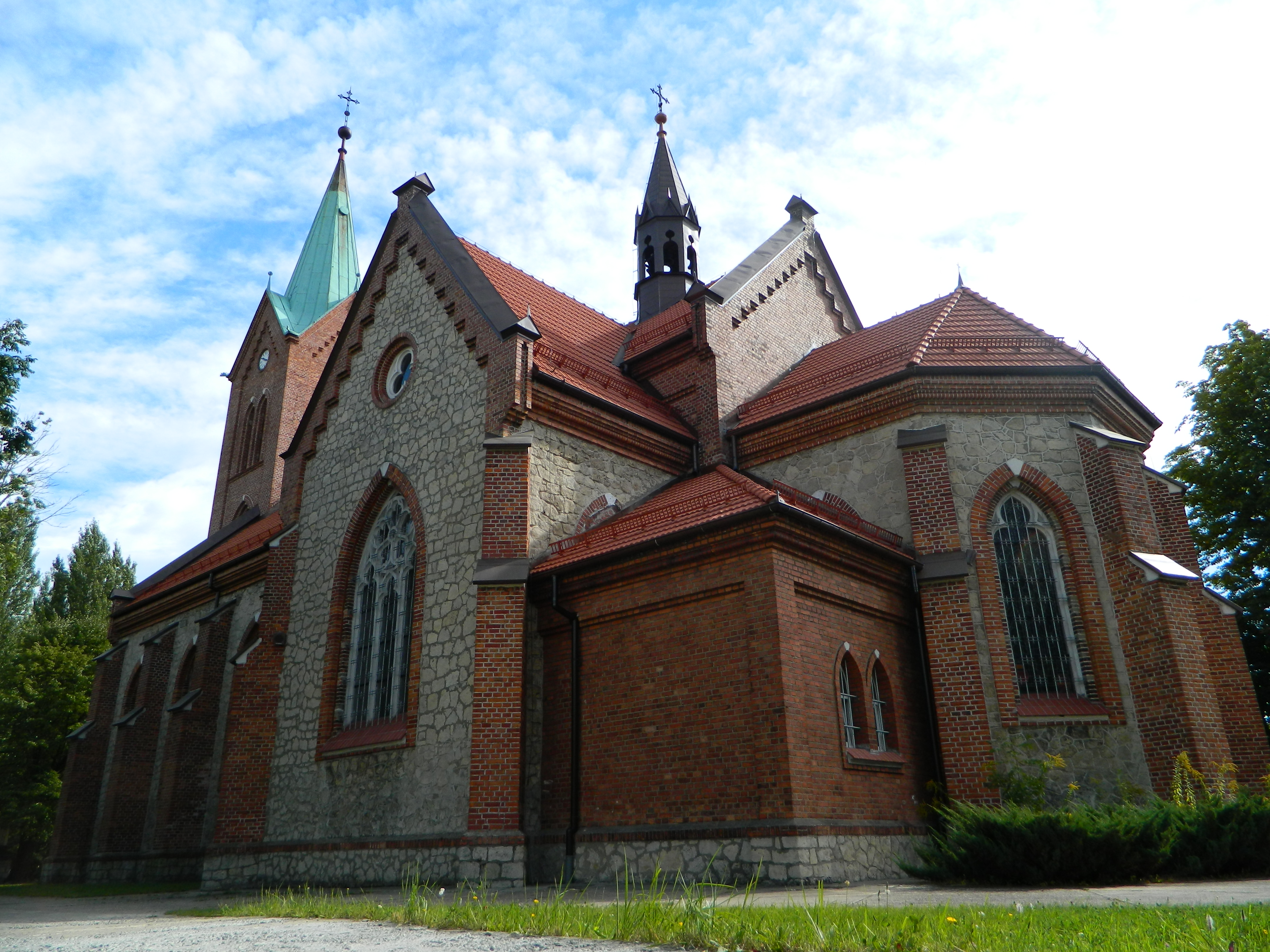
Saint Elisabeth Church

- Online News
  - Jaw.pl
  - Jaworzno.naszemiasto.pl
  - Mojejaworzno.pl
- TV Station
  - DlaCiebie.TV
- Newspapers
  - Co Tydzień
  - Tydzień w Jaworznie
  - Extra
  - Sokół Jaworznicki

== Sport and culture ==
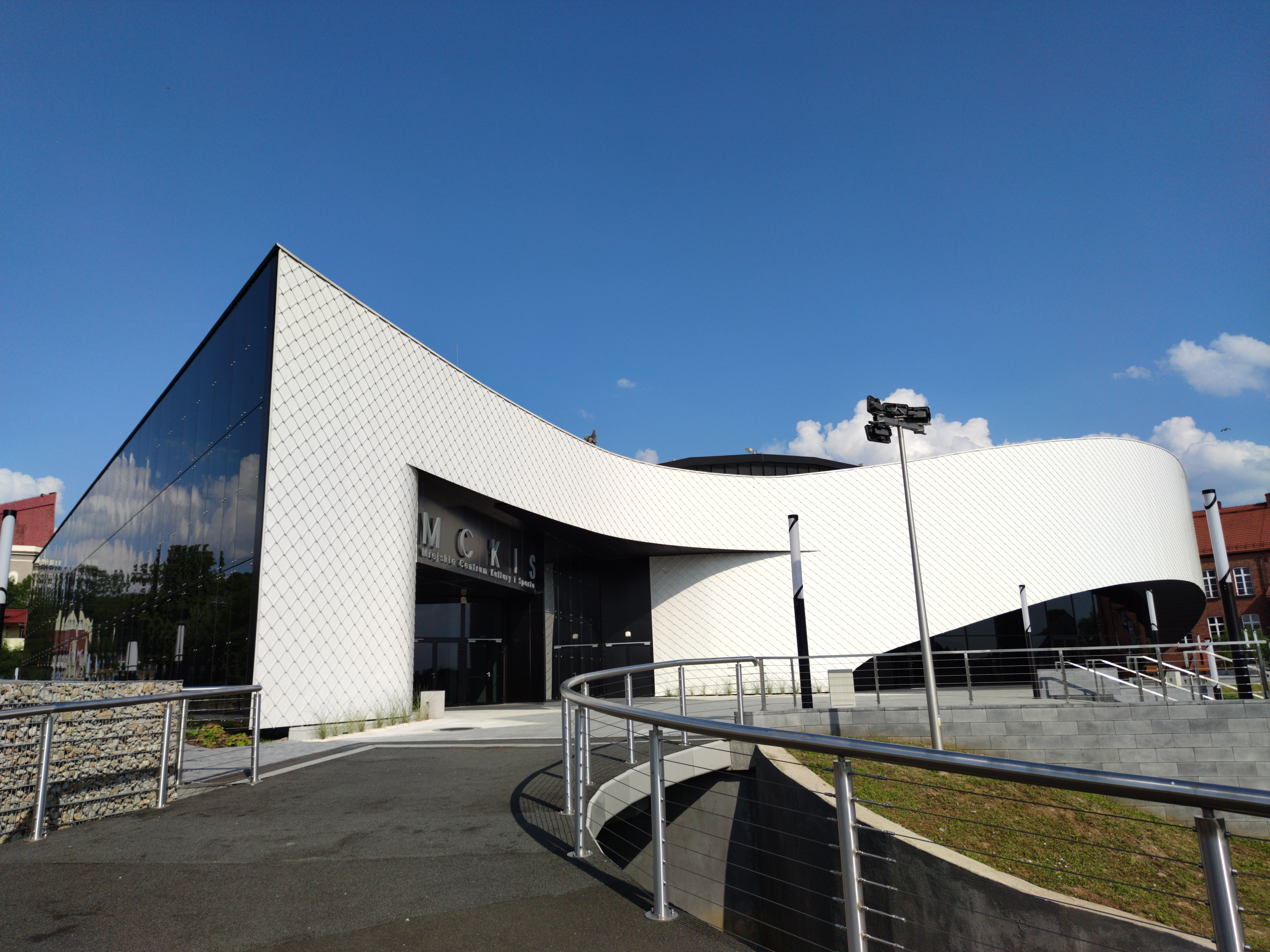
Sports hall

The city of Jaworzno has many sporting facilities at the European level and offers a rich variety of educational and cultural activities. The city's major arena, the Hala Widowiskowo-Sportowa, can seat 2,500 spectators. The Sosina water sports centre is the venue for the annual Polish water-skiing championships.

=== Football ===
- Szczakowianka Jaworzno – football team (1st league 2002/2003)
- GKS Victoria Jaworzno – Poland's oldest miners' team
- The Puma Youth Academy (Akademia Los Puma) – football team (Junior league 2012/2013)

== Notable people ==
- Shelomo Selinger (born 1928), Polish-Jewish sculptor
- Andrzej Stalmach (1942–2020), athlete
- Basia Trzetrzelewska (born 1954), singer and songwriter
- Bogdan Wołkowski (born 1957), professional billiards player
- Andrzej Karweta (1958–2010), Polish Navy Admiral
- Jan Urban (born 1962), footballer
- Wojciech Saługa (born 1969), economist and politician
- Paweł Sarna (born 1977), poet
- Grzegorz Proksa (born 1984), boxer

== Twin towns – sister cities ==
Jaworzno is twinned with:

- Hereford, England, United Kingdom
- Karviná, Czech Republic
- Szigethalom, Hungary
- Yiwu, China
- Berezan, Ukraine
