= Sobieski Coal Mine =

Coal mine in Jaworzno, Silesian Voivodeship, Poland

Coordinates: 50.1836°N 19.2600°E

Sobieski coal mine
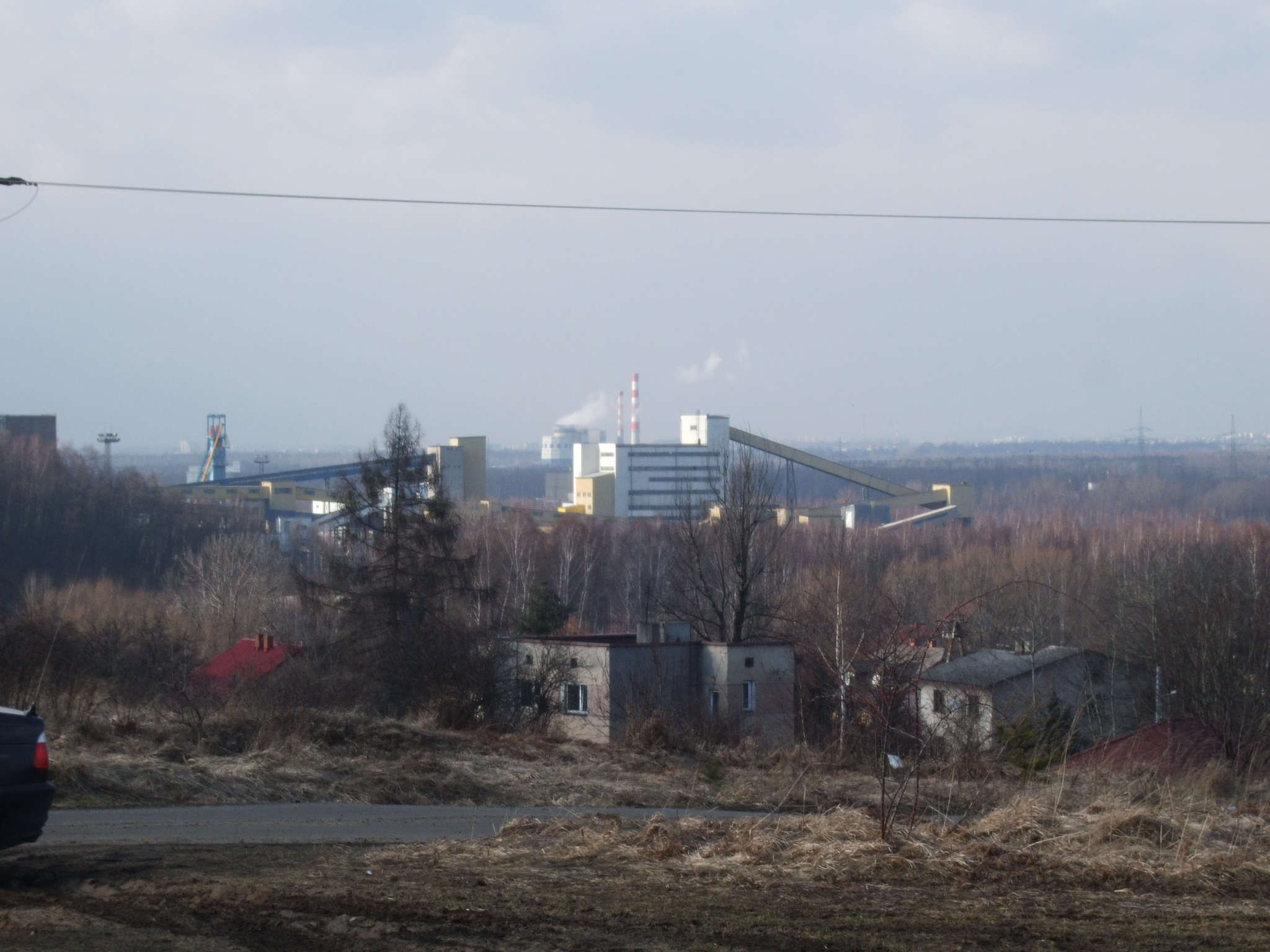
- Sobieski coal mine (2010)
- Interactive map of Sobieski coal mine
- Location: Jaworzno, Silesian Voivodeship, Poland
- Products: Coal
- Production: 6,400,000
- Opened: 1998
- Company: Tauron Wydobycie SA

The Sobieski coal mine is a large mine in the south of Poland in Jaworzno, Silesian Voivodeship, 350 km south-west of the capital, Warsaw. Sobieski represents one of the largest coal reserve in Poland having estimated reserves of 134.1 million tonnes of coal. The annual coal production is around 6.4 million tonnes.
