= Szczakowa =

- District of Jaworzno
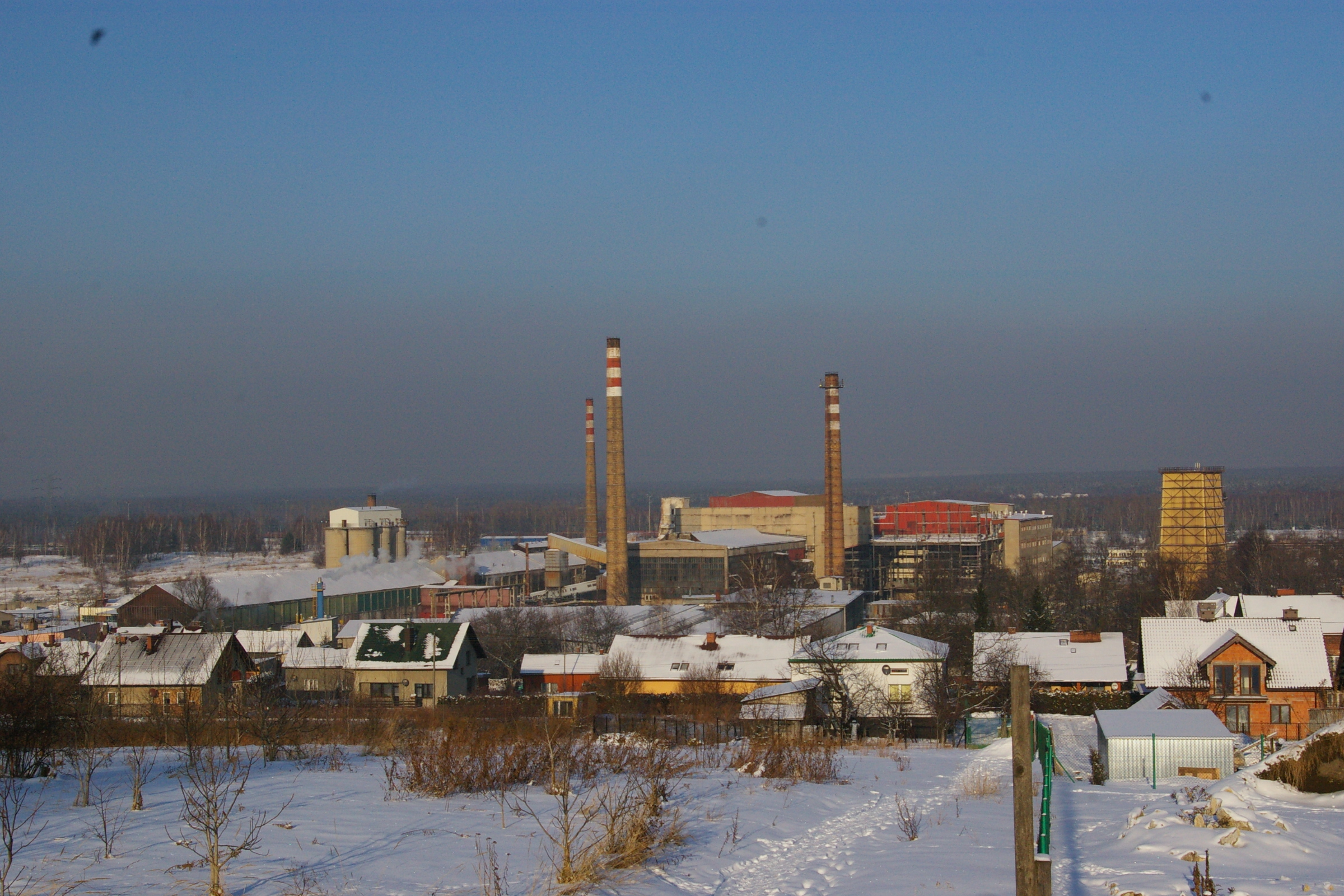
- Glassworks in Szczakowa

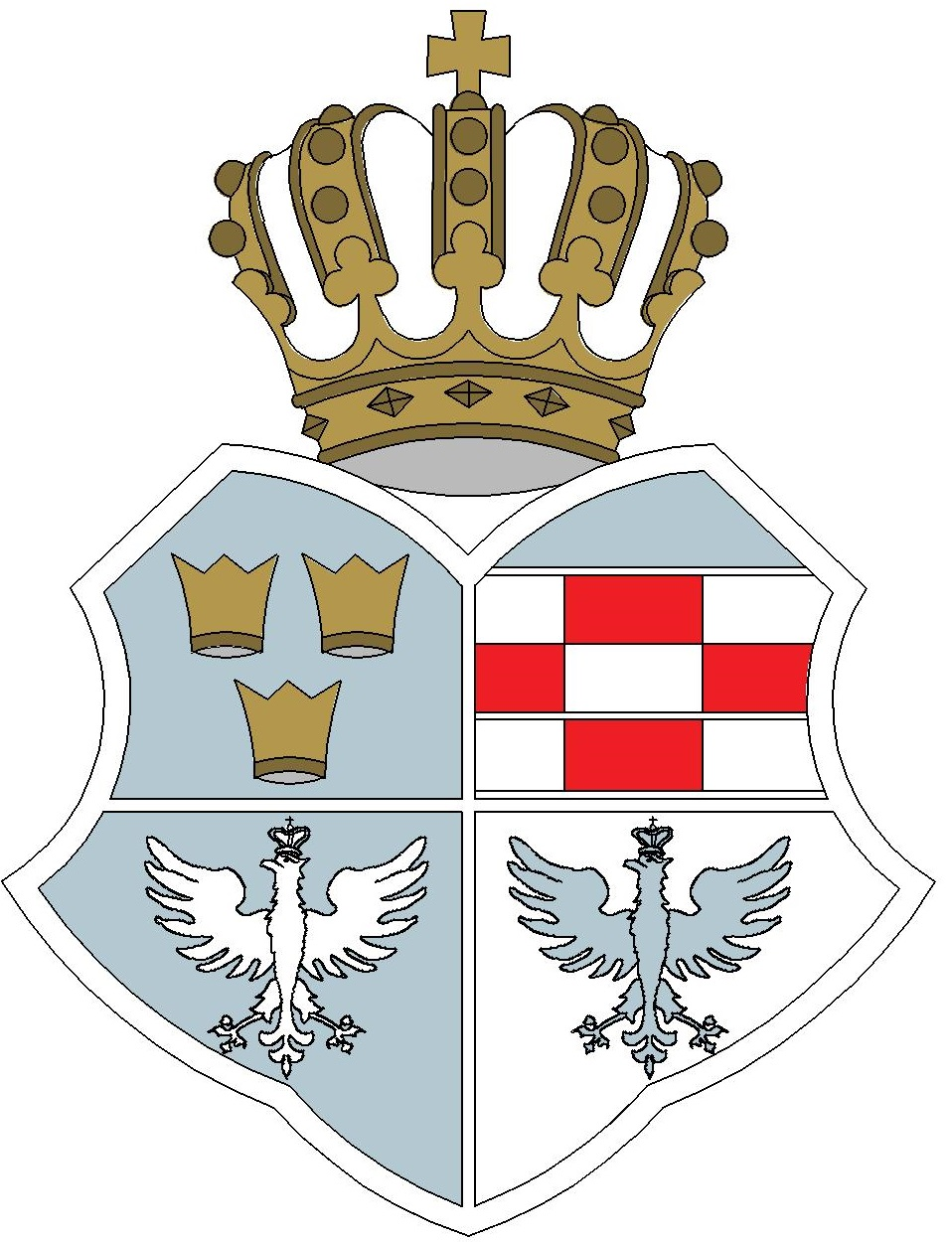
- Coat of arms

- Map of Jaworzno
- Coordinates: 50.238171°N 19.310848°E
- Country: Poland
- Voivodeship: Silesian
- County/City: Jaworzno
- First mentioned: 1427
- Within city limits: 1956
- Time zone: UTC+1 (CET)
  - Summer (DST): UTC+2 (CEST)
- Vehicle registration: SJ

Szczakowa is a district of the Polish city of Jaworzno. Until 1956 it was a separate town in its own right. It is located in the northern part of the city and is one of the most important rail hubs of the area.

== History ==
It was first mentioned in 1427 as Sczacowa.

In the years 1933–1956, it was a separate town, but in 1956 it was incorporated into Jaworzno's city limits.

During the German occupation (World War II), the occupiers operated the E732 forced labour subcamp of the Stalag VIII-B/344 prisoner-of-war camp for Allied POWs in Szczakowa.

== Sport ==
The football club Szczakowianka Jaworzno derives its name from the district, and plays at the Karol Fuchs Stadium.

== Notable people ==
- Antoni Popiel (1865–1910), Polish sculptor
