= Paweł Sarna (poet) =

Polish poet (born 1977)

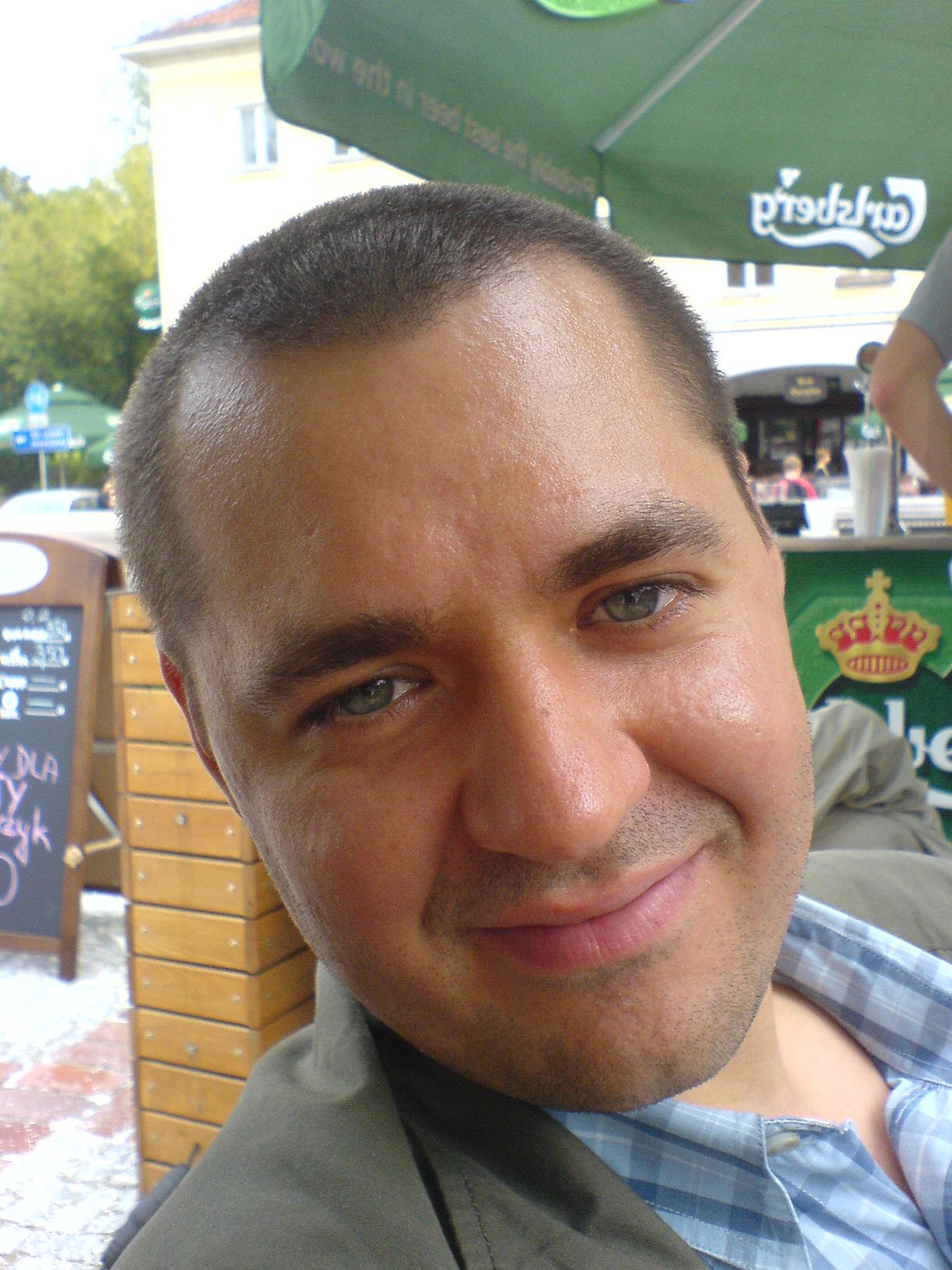
Paweł Sarna, 2006.

Paweł Sarna (born January 26, 1977, in Jaworzno, Poland) is a Polish poet. He has published poems in literary magazines, including Kwartalnik Artystyczny, Studium, Przegląd Artystyczno-Literacki, Tytuł, Undergrunt, and Kursywa. He lives in Katowice.

== Bibliography ==
- Ten i Tamten Bydgoszcz, Świadectwo 2000, ISBN 83-87531-87-1.
- Biały OjczeNasz Kraków, Zielona Sowa 2002, ISBN 83-7220-502-7.
- Czerwony żagiel Kraków, Zielona Sowa 2006, ISBN 83-7435-189-6.
- Śląska awangarda. Poeci grupy Kontekst. Katowice, Katowickie Stowarzyszenie Artystyczne 2004, ISBN 83-921199-0-8.
