= The Holocaust in Luxembourg =

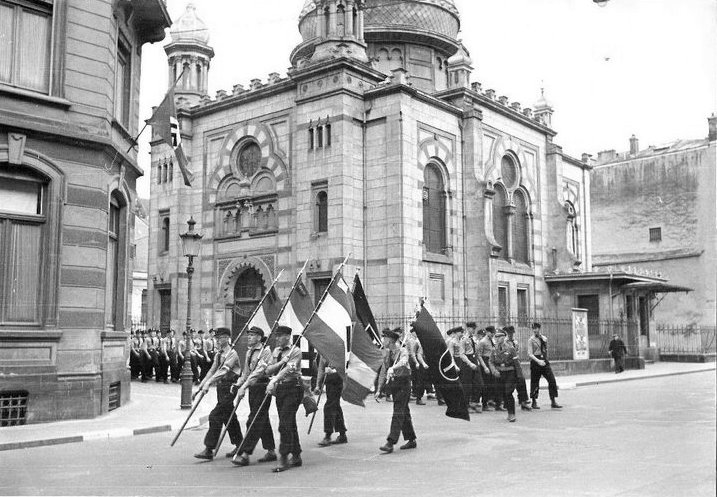
A Nazi parade by the Synagogue in Luxembourg in 1941. It was destroyed in 1943.

Jews in Luxembourg were systematically persecuted, expelled and murdered in the Holocaust after Luxembourg's occupation and later annexation by Nazi Germany. It is generally believed that the Jewish population of Luxembourg had numbered around 3,500 before the war although many fled into France at the time of the German invasion of 10 May 1940 or in the early months of the occupation. Around 1,000 to 2,500 were murdered during the Holocaust after being deported to ghettos and extermination camps in Eastern Europe, under the Civil Administration of Gustav Simon.

== History ==
Around 3,500 Jews lived in Luxembourg before World War II. Many were recent arrivals in the country who had fled from persecution in Nazi Germany and Eastern Europe and who were attracted by the commercial ties between Luxembourg and its surrounding countries and the common use of the German language. A significant number fled on 10 May 1940 at the time of the German invasion of Luxembourg as part of the "exodus" of French, Belgian, and Luxembourgish civilians into eastern and southern France. The German occupation regime established in Luxembourg extended the Nuremberg Race Laws to the territory on 5 September 1940 and encouraged Jews to leave. By October 1941, when emigration was banned, 2,500 Jews had left Luxembourg mainly for the "Free Zone" in Vichy France. Many of the emigrants would become victims of the Holocaust in France. From September 1941, all Jews in Luxembourg were forced to wear the yellow badge to identify them in public.

The Nazi administration interned the remaining 800 Jews in Luxembourg at Fuenfbrunnen transit camp in Troisvierges (Ulflingen) in the north of the country. The programme of deportation began in October 1941 principally to Łódź Ghetto in German-occupied Poland as well as the concentration camps at Theresienstadt and Auschwitz. Only 36 deportees from Luxembourg are believed to have survived the war. Luxembourg was formally annexed into Nazi Germany in August 1942.

== Aftermath ==
Luxembourg was liberated by the Western Allies in early 1945. However, a law of 1950 prevented the majority of Jewish victims and their families from reclaiming assets held in the country before the war by preventing pre-1931 migrants from eligibility. It was said in 2019 that Luxembourg "is the only country in Western Europe with major, unaddressed restitution issues".

The government of Xavier Bettel apologised to the Jewish community of Luxembourg for the country's role in the Holocaust, including the complicity of "some public officials", in 2015.

In January 2021, Luxembourg signed an agreement with the Jewish Community of Luxembourg, the World Jewish Restitution Organization, and the Luxembourg Foundation for the Memory of the Shoah to resolve remaining Holocaust-era property issues, including heirless and communal property claims. With this agreement, Luxembourg committed to establishing an enduring memorial at Cinqfontaines Abbey to the victims of the Holocaust; providing support to remaining Holocaust survivors from Luxembourg; and to develop a national strategy to combat anti-Semitism.

== See also ==
- Luxembourg in World War II
- Luxembourgish Resistance
- Victor Bodson (1902–84), minister and Luxembourg's sole recipient of the title Righteous Among the Nations
