= History of the Jews in Luxembourg =

Luxembourgish Jews Lëtzebuergesch Judden יְהוּדִים לוּקְסֶמְבּוּרְגִים
Total population
- 1,200

Languages
- Luxembourgish, French, German, Hebrew, Yiddish

Religion
- Judaism

Related ethnic groups
- other Ashkenazi Jews

The location of Luxembourg (dark green, in circle) in Europe

The history of the Jews in Luxembourg dates back to the 1200s. There are roughly 1,200 Jews in Luxembourg, and Jews form one of the largest and most important religious and ethnic minority communities in Luxembourg historically.

Judaism is the fifth-largest religious denomination in Luxembourg, behind Roman Catholicism, Protestantism, Orthodox Christianity, and Islam. By absolute size, Luxembourg's community is one of the smallest in the European Union; relative to total population, it is the sixth largest. Judaism is recognised and supported by the government as one of the major state-mandated religions (see: Religion in Luxembourg).

== History ==
The first record of a Jewish community in Luxembourg was made in 1276, and, over the next fifty years, the population grew as a result of immigration from Trier. During the Black Death, the Jews were made scapegoats, and were murdered or expelled from the towns of Luxembourg City and Echternach. A few remained, protected by the intervention of Emperor Charles IV. After the death of Charles, the new Emperor, Wenceslaus, took little interest in affairs in Luxembourg. Deprived of Imperial protection, in 1391, Luxembourg's Jewish population was expelled.

After the initial expulsion, the ban was not thoroughly enforced, and a few Jewish families began to return to Luxembourg from 1405 onwards. During an uprising in 1478, Jewish homes were torched. Only two families remained, but this number had grown to fifteen by 1515. In 1530, Jews were again expelled. This ban was enforced stringently, and Jews did not return to Luxembourg until the late 18th century.

After the Napoleonic conquest of the Austrian Netherlands in 1794, Jews were allowed back into Luxembourg, and the community flourished. By 1810, the number of Jewish families had reached 20. The first synagogue was opened in Luxembourg City in 1823, and Samuel Hirsch was appointed the first chief rabbi in 1843. By 1880, there were 150 Jewish families in Luxembourg, mostly in the Gutland. The first Great Synagogue was built in Luxembourg City in 1894, and the first provincial synagogue in Luxembourg was opened in Ettelbruck in 1870, the second one in Echternach in 1899. By 1927, the Jewish community had grown to 1,171, most of whom had fled the Russian pogroms, and, by the outbreak of the Second World War, the population had grown to about 4,200, fuelled by the arrival of 3,200 refugees from Nazi Germany and Central Europe.

=== Luxembourg and the Holocaust ===
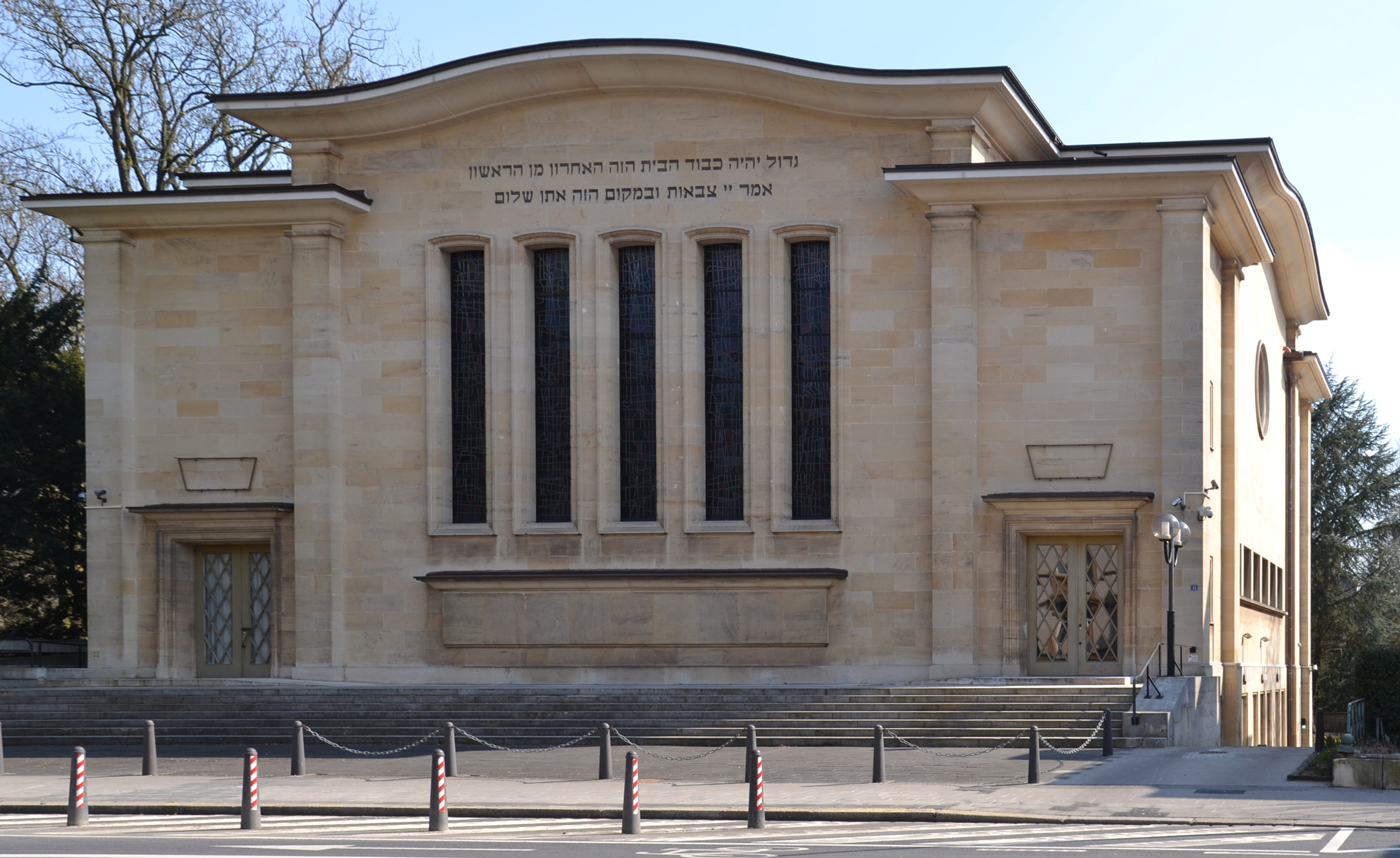
The current synagogue in Luxembourg City is the centre of Jewish worship in Luxembourg, having been rebuilt after the Second World War.

Luxembourg was invaded by Germany on 10 May 1940; before and during the invasion, 50,000 Luxembourgers managed to flee the country, amongst which were 1,650 Jews, who escaped into France and Belgium. Other Jews managed to escape thanks to clandestine rescues, carried out by both the resistance and individuals; the most famous of these individuals was Victor Bodson, a cabinet minister and Righteous Among the Nations. On 5 September, Gustav Simon announced the extension of the Nuremberg Laws to Luxembourg. From October 1940, the Gestapo adopted a policy of encouraging Jews to emigrate westwards; in the following year, nearly, 1,000 took this opportunity, although it would not be enough to escape the Nazis' persecution.

On 22 October 1940 the synagogue of Esch was destroyed. In May 1941 the synagogue of Luxembourg City was closed by the Gestapo, vandalised and then razed, which took until autumn of 1943. On 3 June 1941 the synagogue in Esch was also destroyed.

From 7 February 1941 a law mandated the confiscation of all property of those who had emigrated up until 1940. From 18 April 1941 this was extended to Jews remaining in Luxembourg. The confiscated property was either sold off or used by various Nazi organisations. The money was intended to be used towards funding the germanisation policy in Luxembourg, the so-called Aufbaufonds Moselland. In November 1941 all Jewish organisations were dissolved and more than 35,000 Reichsmark were confiscated.

Most Jews that remained in the Grand Duchy were interned at Fünfbrunnen, an internment camp near Troisvierges. From here, 696 Jewish prisoners were deported to ghettos, labour camps, and extermination camps, of whom, 56 survived. More than 500 Luxembourgish Jews that had fled to France or Belgium were also deported to camps, of whom 16 survived. Altogether, 1,945 of the 3,500 pre-war Luxembourgish Jews died, whilst 1,555 survived the Holocaust by fleeing, hiding, or surviving in detention.

At the end of the war, out of six Jewish congregations (Luxembourg City, Esch-Alzette, Ettelbruck, Mondorf, Medernach and Grevenmacher) only two remained, in Luxembourg and in Esch.

Luxembourg government's 2015 report: The "Jewish Question" in Luxembourg (1933-1941): The Luxembourg State in the Face of Nazi Anti-Semitic Persecution. was unanimously adopted in the government and it apologized to the Jewish community.

=== Luxembourgish Jewry today ===
After the war, about 1,500 Jews who had fled Luxembourg returned, mostly merchants. Communities were re-established across Luxembourg, particularly in Luxembourg City and Esch-sur-Alzette. Synagogues were built in both of these cities; whilst the capital's Great Synagogue had been demolished by the Nazis. Over the second half of the twentieth century, Luxembourg's Jewish population gradually shrank, as families emigrated to other countries. In recent years, a wave of immigration by young Jews, mainly from France, attracted by good working conditions, has compensated somewhat the shrinking of the Jewish population.

== Antisemitism ==
Unlike many other countries in Europe, including some of Luxembourg's closest neighbours, there is a very low level of antisemitic behaviour and attitude in Luxembourg. In the first half of 2002, there were no reports of antisemitic attacks in the Grand Duchy. Hate speech and verbal aggression towards Jews are also almost unheard of.

No antisemitic political parties exist in Luxembourg. In the late 1980s and early 1990s, the National Movement, a far-right and openly xenophobic political party, achieved moderate success by the ballot box. Despite its attraction to neo-Nazis and its opposition to ethnic and religious minorities, most of its rhetoric was aimed at guest workers from southern Europe, and not at the Jewish population. The National Movement folded in the mid-1990s, and no far-right organisation has taken its place.

According to the European Jewish Congress, the Jewish community in Luxembourg has been faced with an "explosion" of antisemitism since October 7, 2023, and the Gaza war.

== See also ==
- Israel–Luxembourg relations

== External links and further reading ==
- Website of Chabad Lubavitch in Luxembourg (lubavitch.lu)
- Website of the Jewish community of Luxembourg (synagogue.lu)
- Website of the Jewish community of Esch-sur-Alzette, Luxembourg
- Jewish Luxembourg
- Muller, Tanja (November 2011). ""Nichts gegen die Juden als solche …" Das "Judenproblem" im Luxemburger Wort und in der katholischen Kirche im 19. Jahrhundert" (PDF). Forum (in German) (312).
