= Żywiec Gorals =

Górale Żywieccy
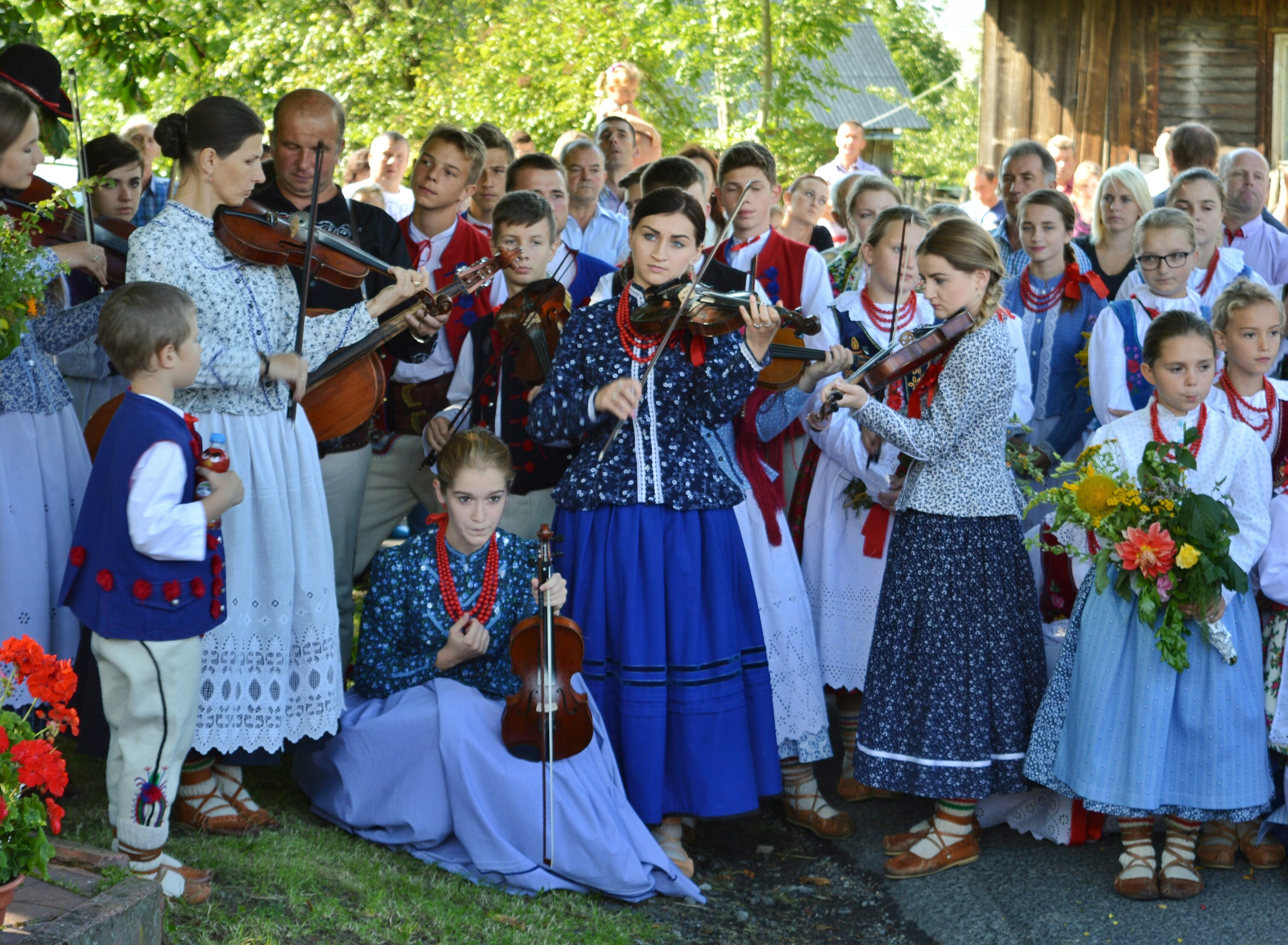

Regions with significant populations
- Żywiec Region (Żywiec Beskids, Little Beskids, Silesian Beskids)

Languages
- Żywiec dialect

Religion
- Catholicism

Related ethnic groups
- Gorals and other Poles

The Żywiec Gorals (Polish: Górale Żywieccy), also anglicized as the Żywiec Highlanders, are an ethnographic group of Polish Gorals that mostly live in the Western Beskids mountain ranges, specifically in the Żywiec Beskids, the Little Beskids, and a part of the Silesian Beskids. They inhabit the Żywiec Region (Żywiecczyzna) of Lesser Poland.

== Geographic distribution ==
The Żywiec Gorals inhabit the Żywiec Region, a geographical and cultural area in southern Poland. It is a part of the Lesser Poland historical region and its capital is the town of Żywiec. Since 1999, the Żywiec Region is split between two voivodeships: Silesian (Żywiec and Bielsko counties) and Lesser Poland (Sucha County). The region includes the mountain ranges of Żywiec Beskids, Silesian Beskids, Little Beskids, Maków Beskids, as well as the lowland of Żywiec Basin. In the Żywiec Beskids, localities inhabited by the Żywiec Gorals include the villages of: Glinka, Hucisko, Jeleśnia, Korbielów, Koszarawa, Krzyżowa, Kurów, Lachowice, Pewel Wielka, Przyborów, Rajcza, Rycerka Dolna, Rycerka Górna, Soblówka, Sopotnia Wielka, Sól, Stryszawa, Ujsoły, and Zwardoń.

During the Second World War, Nazi Germany authorities conducted a mass expulsion of about 20,000 ethnic Gorals from the Żywiec Region. As a result of Action Saybusch, some Żywiec Gorals were displaced to various regions of occupied Poland, including the areas of Warsaw, Chełm, Hrubieszów, Biłgoraj, Wadowice, and Radzymin. After the war, some Żywiec Gorals settled is Opolian Silesia, in villages such as Lubrza (Prudnik County) and Sidzina (Nysa County).

== Language ==
The Żywiec Gorals speak locally varied subdialects, collectively referred to as the Żywiec dialect and classified as a dialect of the Goral ethnolect. Language of the Żywiec Gorals is unique among Goral dialects because of Silesian influence.
