= Zbigniew Bielewicz =

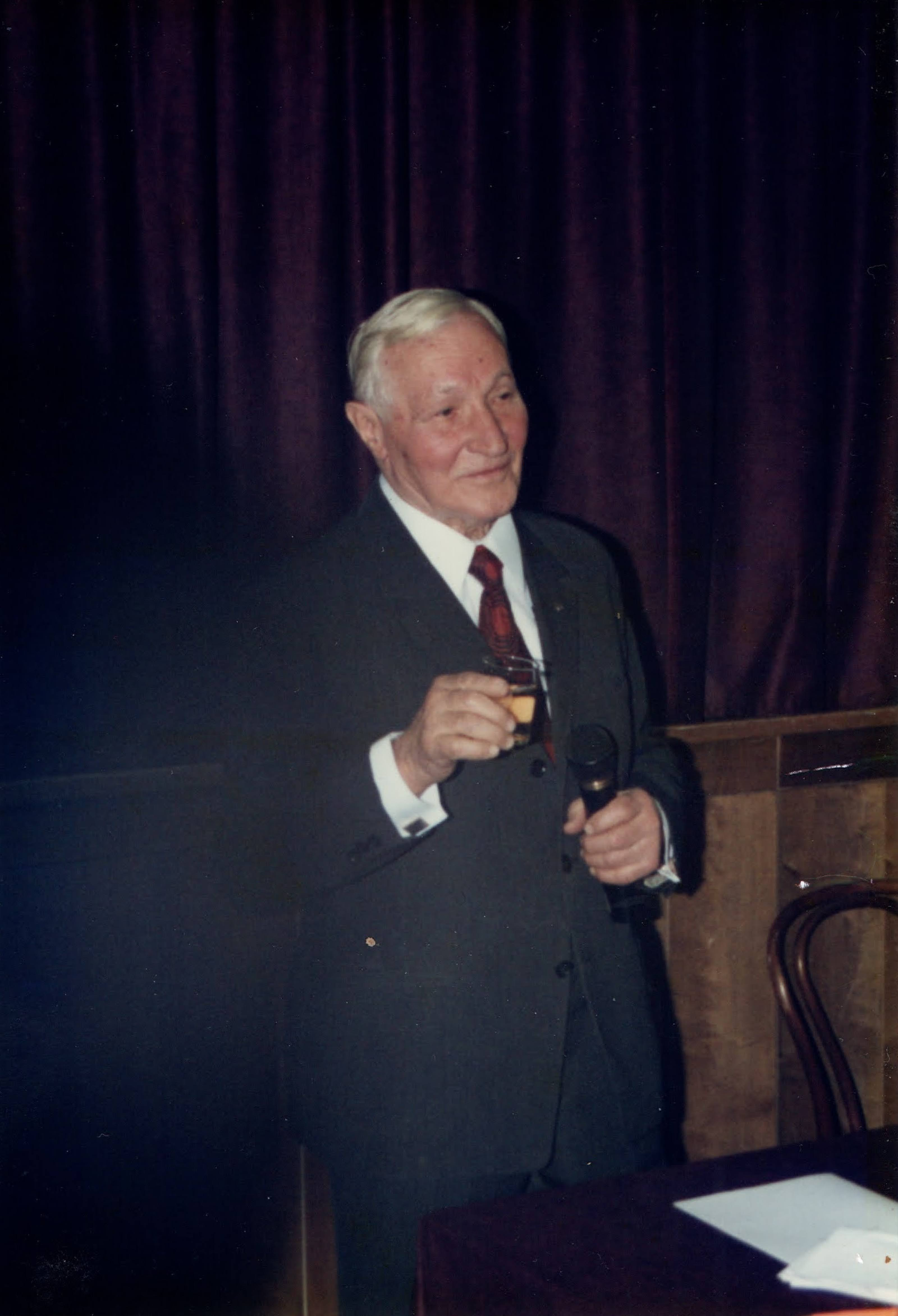
- Zbigniew Bielewicz at an exhibition of his works in 1997.
- Born: August 10, 1913; Kęty
- Died: September 8, 2008 (aged 95); Bielsko-Biała
- Resting place: Municipal Cemetery in Kamienica, Bielsko-Biała; 49.798917°N 19.014806°E
- Education: Institute of Fine Arts in Kraków (Note: Not to be confused with the Jan Matejko Academy of Fine Arts in Kraków.)
- Spouse: Janina Kubik
- Children: Aleksandra Boguniowska-Saferna

Zbigniew Bielewicz (born August 10, 1913, in Kęty, died September 8, 2008, in Bielsko-Biała) was a Polish artist, painter, graphic designer, and teacher. He was also a soldier during World War II. He was awarded a "Participation in the defensive war of 1939" Medal and the "Veteran of the Fight for Freedom and Independence of the Fatherland" badge.

== Life ==
Bielewicz was born on August 10, 1913 in Kęty. He attended school, first in Kęty, and then in Bielsko (currently a part of Bielsko-Biała). He entered the Teachers' College in Biała Krakowska (currently a part of Bielsko-Biała). After two years, he left it to work with his father as a confectioner. In 1933 he graduated a one-year merchant training school in Bielsko. In November 1935 he joined the 4th Podhale Rifle Regiment (4. Pułk Strzelców Podhalańskich) in Cieszyn. He was then moved to the Border Protection Corps. Bielewicz took part in the September campaign, for which in 1985 he was awarded a medal for "participation in the defensive war of 1939", and in 1995 the "Veteran of the Fight for Freedom and Independence of the Fatherland" badge.

Ja brałem udział w całej kampanii od Śląska – umundurowany i wyposażony bojowo w Oświęcimiu (znajdował się tam batalion 73 P.P.) – teren obecnego obozu zagłady. Przeszedłem cały szlak bojowy, aż do Lasów Tomaszowskich biorąc udział w licznych potyczkach. Tutaj zostaliśmy otoczeni ze wszystkich stron. Była jedna luka południowo-wschodnia [...].

We wsi Łętownia k. Przeworska udało mi się zmylić straże i w przebraniu cywilnym [...] wrócić po dłuższych tarapatach do domu. Był to już koniec września 1939.

Przygnębienie, smutek i rozpacz ściskały serce, ale żyć trzeba dalej, przyjąć ciężkie warunki okupanta.

I took part in the entire campaign from Silesia – uniformed and equipped for combat in Oświęcim (there was a battalion of the 73 P.P.) – the area of the current extermination camp. I walked the entire combat trail, up to the Lasy Tomaszowskie, taking part in numerous clashes. Here we were surrounded on all sides. There was one south-east gap [...]. In the village of Łętownia near Przeworsk, I managed to confuse the guards and, in civilian disguise, [...] returned home after a long trouble. It was the end of September 1939.

Despondency, sadness and despair squeezed the heart, but one must live on, accept the harsh conditions of the occupant.

— Zbigniew Bielewicz, Dzieje życia – co pozostało w sercu i pamięci (Bielewicz's autobiography)

During the occupation of Poland he lived in Żywiec, where he worked at Żywieckie Zakłady Papiernicze „Solali" (Żywiec Paper Plants "Solali") as a room painter and graphic designer of letters and signboards. On September 14, 1940, he married Janina Kubik, and in 1943 his daughter Aleksandra was born. After the war, on June 1, 1945, he resumed studying, in the Institute of Fine Arts in Kraków. In 1948 – under the guidance of professors Witold Chomicz, Jerzy Karolak and Stanisław Jakubowski – he graduated in graphic arts at this university. From 1949 to 1950 Bielewicz was working as a teacher in Nowa Ruda. In 1952 he was a drafter at Państwowe Zakłady Graficzne (State Graphic Works), and next year at Spółdzielnia „Dekoracja" ("Decoration" Cooperative, known later as Spółdzielnia Pracy Przemysłu Ludowego i Artystycznego – Folk and Art Industry Work Cooperative) in Stalinograd (currently Katowice). In 1953 he became interested in the polychromes of churches.

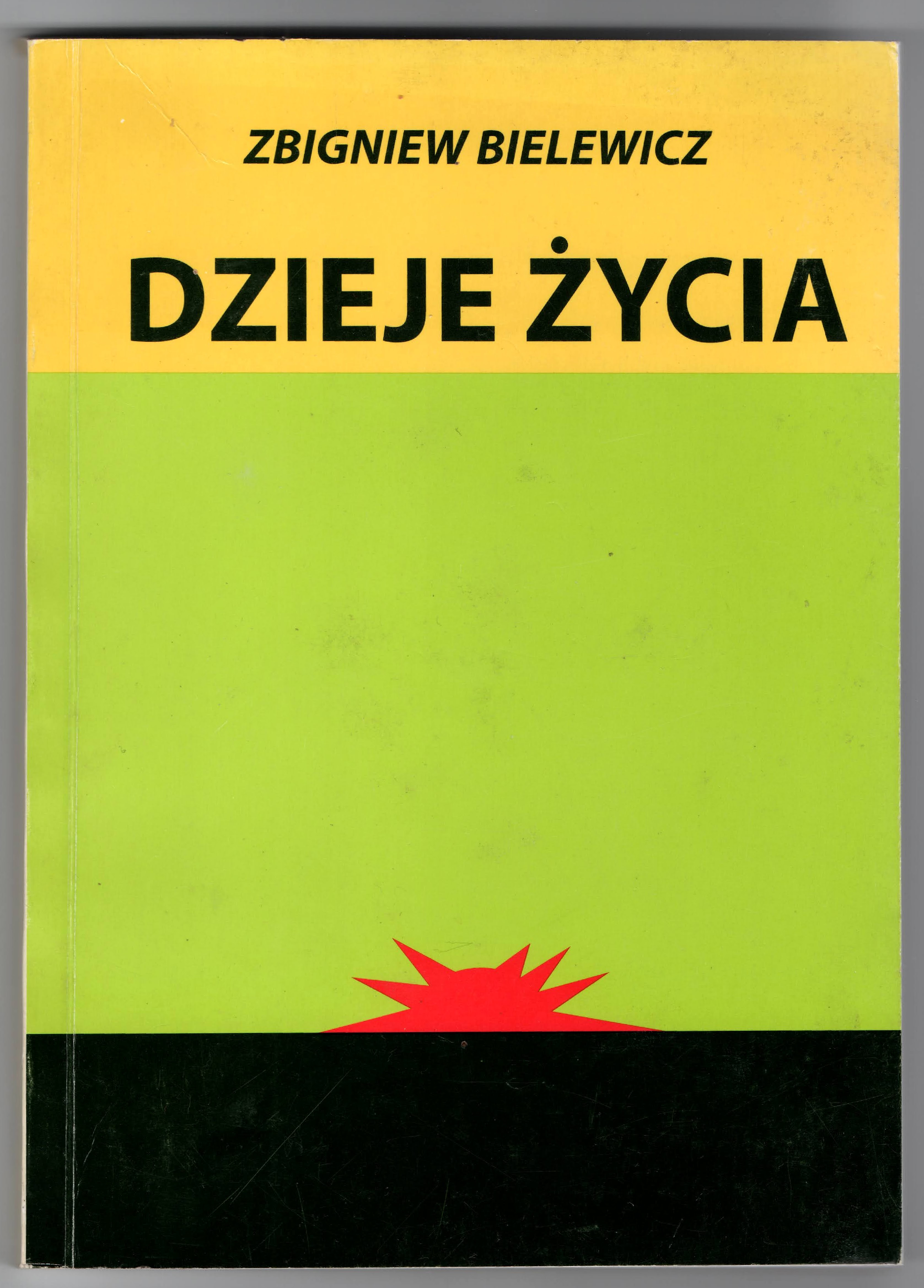
Autobiography of Zbigniew Bielewicz.

In September 1956 he moved to Bielsko-Biała, where he was making signboards for Spółdzielnia „Społem" ("Społem" cooperative). In the years 1953–1984 he designed, made and renovated several dozen of altars and elements of churches and chapels in Poland, especially in the south. For example in: Kędzierzyn-Koźle, Oświęcim, Borek Strzeliński, Biała, Kiczora near Zwardoń, Ludźmierz in Podhale, Olszynka near Prudnik, Rajcza, Milówka, Lipnik (Bielsko-Biała), Walawa near Przemyśl, Rogoźnik near Nowy Targ, Przemyśl and Rybarzowice.

He had his first exhibition in the pavilion at Lenin Street (currently 3 Maja Street) in Bielsko-Biała from March 15 to April 4, 1971. It was organised by Związek Polskich Artystów Plastyków (Association of Polish Artists and Designers) which he joined in Bielsko-Biała in 1951 (ID number: 2311).

[Obrazy z wystawy pochodzą z moich wyjazdów na plenery.] Malowałem w różnym czasie. W dalszej kolejności robiłem wypady poza miasto Bielsko-Biała na dwa, trzy dni, tak że w końcu miałem tekę zapełnioną. Przedstawiłem miejscowemu społeczeństwu 72 akwarele. Ta technika mi najbardziej odpowiadała. Na to złożyło się dziesięć lat pracy, chodzenia po wertepach, dźwiganie ciężkiego ekwipunku.

[The paintings in the exhibition come from my trips to open-air workshops.] I painted at different times. Later, I made trips outside the city of Bielsko-Biała for two or three days, so that in the end I had a full portfolio. I presented 72 watercolors to the local community. This technique suited me best. It took ten years of work, walking on bumpy roads, carrying heavy equipment.

— Zbigniew Bielewicz, Dzieje życia – co pozostało w sercu i pamięci (Bielewicz's autobiography)

He became a full member of ZPAP (APAD) in 1972, recommended by his colleagues Jan Grabowski and Ignacy Bieniek. The following years and his retirement Bielewicz has devoted to painting for the exhibitions of the artists' association and as an amateur. Zbigniew Bielewicz died on September 8, 2008, in Bielsko-Biała. He rests at the Municipal Cemetery in Kamienica, Bielsko-Biała.

== Major exhibitions ==
Name	Duration	Place	Description
Akwarele Zbigniewa Bielewicza (Zbigniew Bielewicz's watercolors)	March 15 – April 4, 1971	Pavilion at Lenin Street (currently 3 Maja Street) in Bielsko-Biała.	Like all the exhibitions, it was co-organized by ZPAP (APAD). 72 watercolors from many open-air locations that the author traveled to during the previous 10 years were presented.
Zbigniew Bielewicz – akwarele, oleje, projekty polichromii wnętrz (Zbigniew Bielewicz – watercolors, oil paints, interior polychrome designs)	December 1983	Biuro Wystaw Artystycznych (Art Exhibitions Office) in Bielsko-Biała.	Not only wall paintings were presented, but also sketches, designs, and polychromes.
Malarstwo Zbigniewa Bielewicza (Zbigniew Bielewicz's painting art)	December 1, 1988 – January 10, 1989	Wojewódzka Biblioteka Publiczna (Voivodeship's Public Library) in Bielsko-Biała, Muzeum Beskidzkie (Beskid Museum) in Wisła, Cieszyńskie Centrum Kultury (Cieszyn's Culture Center) in Cieszyn, Museum in Żywiec (Towarzystwo Miłośników Ziemi Żywieckiej – Society of Lovers of the Żywiec Land).	Under the patronage of the Beskidzkie Towarzystwo Społeczno-Kulturalne (Beskid Social and Cultural Society). During the vernissage, the author received a „Sztaluga Juliana Fałata" ("Julian Fałat's Easel" – see: Julian Fałat). In October 1989, some of the works were transferred to the Galeria Sztuki Współczesnej (Contemporary Art Gallery) in Wadowice.
Jubileuszowa wystawa malarstwa Zbigniewa Bielewicza (Jubilee exhibition of paintings by Zbigniew Bielewicz)	May 2 – ?? 1994	Wojewódzka Biblioteka Publiczna (Voivodeship's Public Library) in Bielsko-Biała.	160 people attended the opening, including Zbigniew Leraczyk, vice-president of Bielsko-Biała, and Zbigniew Stadnicki, president of the Związek Kombatantów (Polish Society of War Veterans). 67 watercolors and 5 oils on canvas have been presented.
Wysokie Tatry w malarstwie Zbigniewa Bielewicza (The High Tatras in Zbigniew Bielewicz's paintings)	January 9 – March 8, 1997	Książnica Beskidzka (The Beskid Library) in Bielsko-Biała.	Zbigniew Bielewicz's last exhibition, crowning his career. Viewers could see 22 works focused on the Polish Tatras. The paintings were dated from 1988 to 1995.

== Bibliography ==
- Dzieje życia – co pozostało w sercu i pamięci (in Polish). Bielsko-Biała: TIMEX. 2006.
- Oblicza Bielska-Białej: twórcy ikonografii miasta – prace ze zbiorów Muzeum w Bielsku Białej (in Polish). Bielsko-Biała: Bielsko-Biała Museum. 2010. ISBN 978-83-88105-34-0.
