= Action Saybusch =

Polish displacement

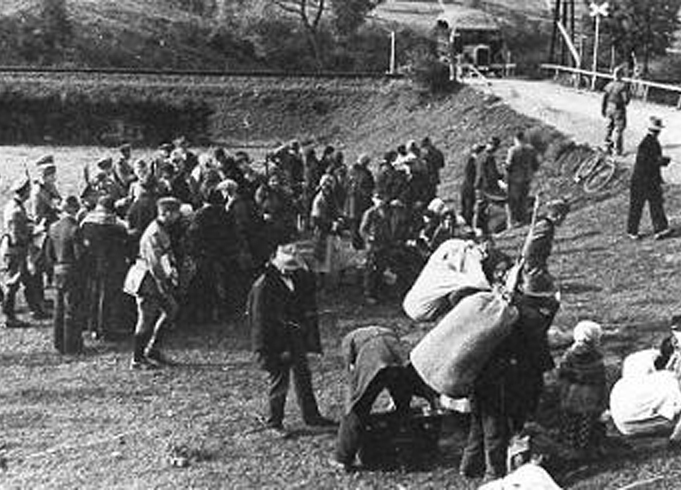
Aktion Saybusch, 24 September 1940. Expelled Poles await transport at a railway crossing (in this photo, some members of the 129 families deported from the village of Dolna Sól).

Action Saybusch (German: Aktion Saybusch, Polish: Akcja Żywiec) was the mass expulsion of some 18,000–20,000 ethnic Polish Gorals from the territory of Żywiec Region (part of the region of Lesser Poland) in the area annexed to the German Province of Upper Silesia, conducted by the Wehrmacht and German police during the German occupation of Poland in World War II. The main purpose of the forcible displacement of Polish nationals was to create space for ethnically German colonists from across Eastern Europe, after the annexation of western Poland into the Third Reich in 1939.

The Action was part of the Adolf Hitler's plan known as Lebensraum which involved Germanization of all Polish areas west of the territory allocated to the General Government. The name of the Action came from the German name of the city of Żywiec – Saybusch. Displacements of the Poles from Żywiec and surrounding villages and towns was led by the occupation authorities under SS-Obersturmbannführer Fritz Arlt, who replaced Bruno Müller from RKF.

Aktion Saybusch lasted from September to December 1940, with some 3,200 Volksdeutsche brought in Heim ins Reich (Home into the Empire) from Romanian Bukovina. The process of expulsions continued thereafter. In total, between 1940 and 1944, around 50,000 Poles were forcibly removed from the region and replaced with about 4,000 settlers from Eastern Galicia and Volhynia who were given new latifundia. Before the German attack on the Soviet Union, their transfer was agreed upon by both invaders at the Gestapo–NKVD Conferences. The expulsions from eastern Silesia were the direct responsibility of the SS-Obergruppenführer Erich von dem Bach-Zelewski, who was also responsible for instigating them.

== Course of the expulsions ==
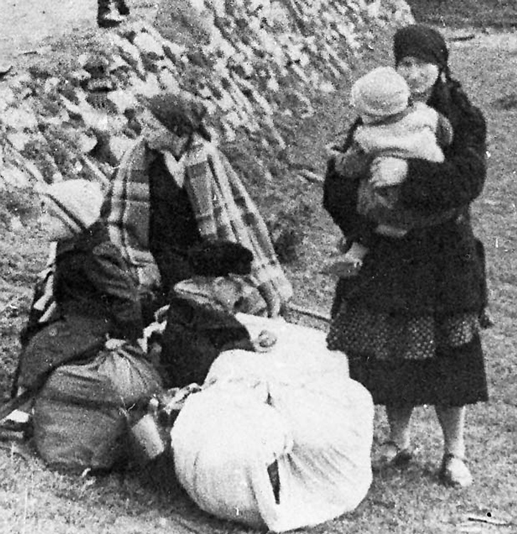
Women awaiting transport during Action Saybusch, 24 September 1940

In December 1939, the German police conducted a population census in the region. Over 99 percent of the locals declared Polish nationality, much more than in the proper Silesia to the immediate west. Analysis of the census figures set the stage for the mass deportations across Upper Silesia (the Żywiec region is part of Lesser Poland, which was annexed to the German province of Upper Silesia, but is not part of (Upper) Silesia), which was decided in July 1940. Some believe that Polish Jews were not a part of this Aktion. On the other hand, the Holocaust historian Christopher R. Browning wrote that Jews had to have been an integral part of it. The local Germans "had not diligently carried out the identification and seizure of Polish activists and intelligentsia and thus were not eager to report the actual number of Jews deported." For example, the Jewish families from the Zabłocie district of Żywiec were transported to a transit ghetto and labour camp in Sucha Beskidzka in the spring of 1941, and in 1942 sent aboard Holocaust trains to Auschwitz. Everything was carefully prepared by the German occupation authorities, with schedules for the Polish train transports, food rations, and a group of Gestapo functionaries who spoke Polish. The cost of the operation estimated at about 300,000 ℛ︁ℳ︁ was to be paid by the captives themselves. The Action began simultaneously at different locations on September 22, 1940 at 5 in the morning. The police and army units surrounded Polish settlements and entered individual homes ordering farmers to get out within 20 minutes. Eye-witness Helena Szatanikowa remarked that all instructions came from a warrant printed in Polish. Residents were requested to turn in all money and valuables. They were allowed to take with them only clothing and food, leaving behind everything else including livestock. They were marched and trucked to the so-called transit points in the nearby towns of Żywiec, Rajcza, Sucha Beskidzka, and farther away like Końskie and others. Meanwhile, the new Germanic settlers were already waiting at the distribution centers set up in Bogumin and Cieszyn. The Poles were subjected to selection, and separated into those "racially valuable" (for preferential treatment) and the rest, including women and children. Groups of young men were gathered for slave labor in Germany. According to German law all captives were to be supplied with necessities for 14 days; however, in practice they were stripped of the remnants of their own belongings in the process of luggage and body searches.

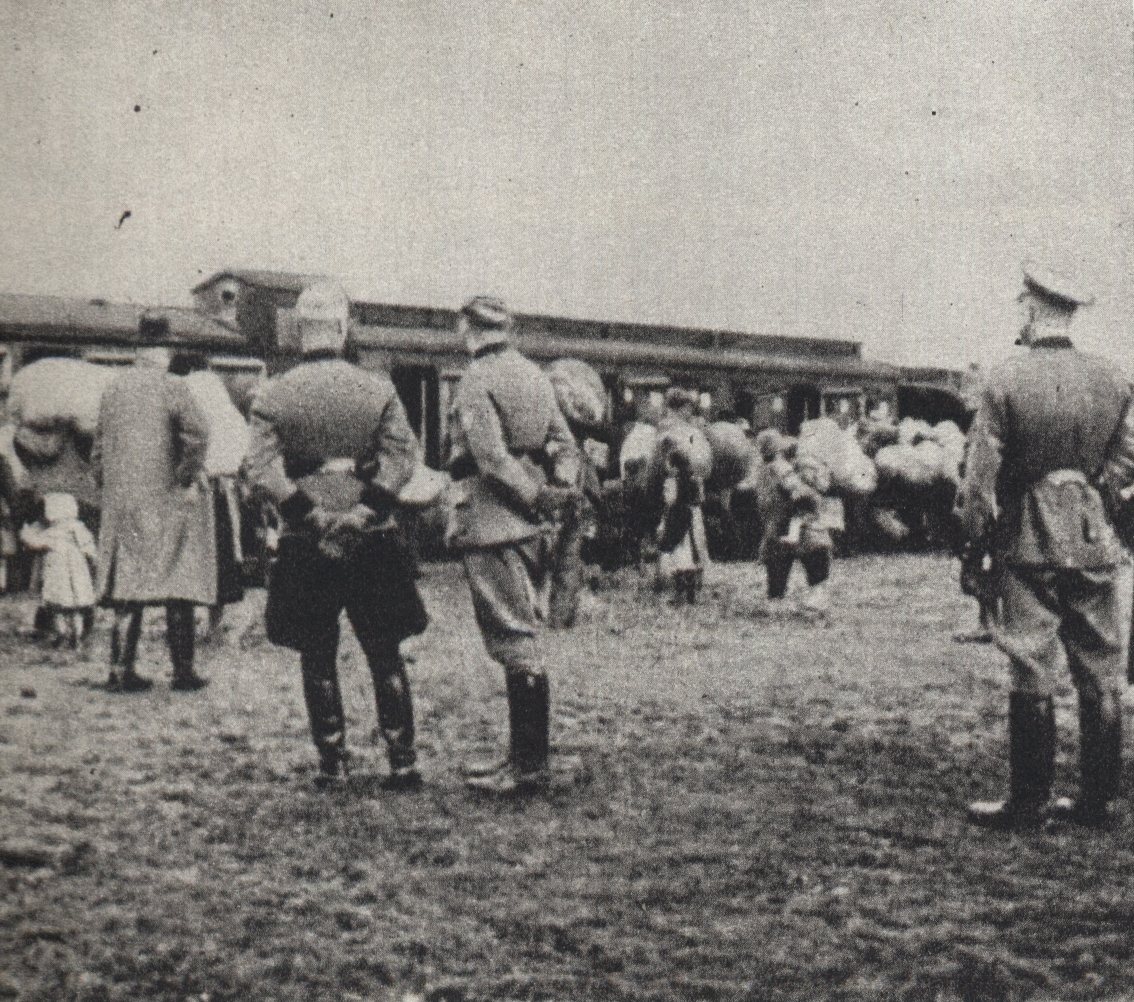
Polish families carrying allowable possessions board deportation train

The assembly points at railway stations held each time about 1,000 Polish people; who were split into groups of 40 in line with already numbered rail cars. Each transport was usually sent separately, first to a railway junction in Łódź (for further selection), and from there, to previously chosen locations across the General Government (Generalgouvernement). Poles were delivered to towns and villages in the vicinity of Biłgoraj, Wadowice, Radzymin, Łuków, and to the Lublin and Kielce governorates (see, the Lublin Reservation organized since October 1939), where they were dropped off alone without any help. Moreover, the Germans had warned the local population that the arriving deportees were criminals, thus further worsening their plight. They were met with fear and only reluctant acceptance at their destinations. Many died during transport. Others were forced to beg. The whole displacement action was conducted by the Polizei-Battalion No. 82 (under Kegel) and Battalion No. 83 (under Eugen Seim, stationed in Jeleśnia) with approximately 500 soldiers as well as numerous SS, RKF and NSDAP functionaries including Katowice Gestapo officers.

== Settlers, forced labor and further displacement ==
Abandoned Polish houses were cleaned and washed by forced laborers, mostly Jewish captives and some remaining Gorals, who were later employed by the new farm-owners. Sheds deemed unsanitary were torn down. The department prepared swastika flags and portraits of Hitler to be placed at farms declared ready for occupation by the new Germans. Despite the Nazi propaganda campaign painting a rosy picture of their opulent future, the new hosts were not given the best of lands, which were reserved for the Reichsdeutsche who had served in the Wehrmacht. Many settlers were disappointed by the simple wooden cottages they were told to move into and the poor quality farmland they were allotted. The Wartheland Gaue officials on their part lamented the newcomers' cultural backwardness in comparison to most Poles and their inability to speak proper German. The new settlers were put under permanent police surveillance.

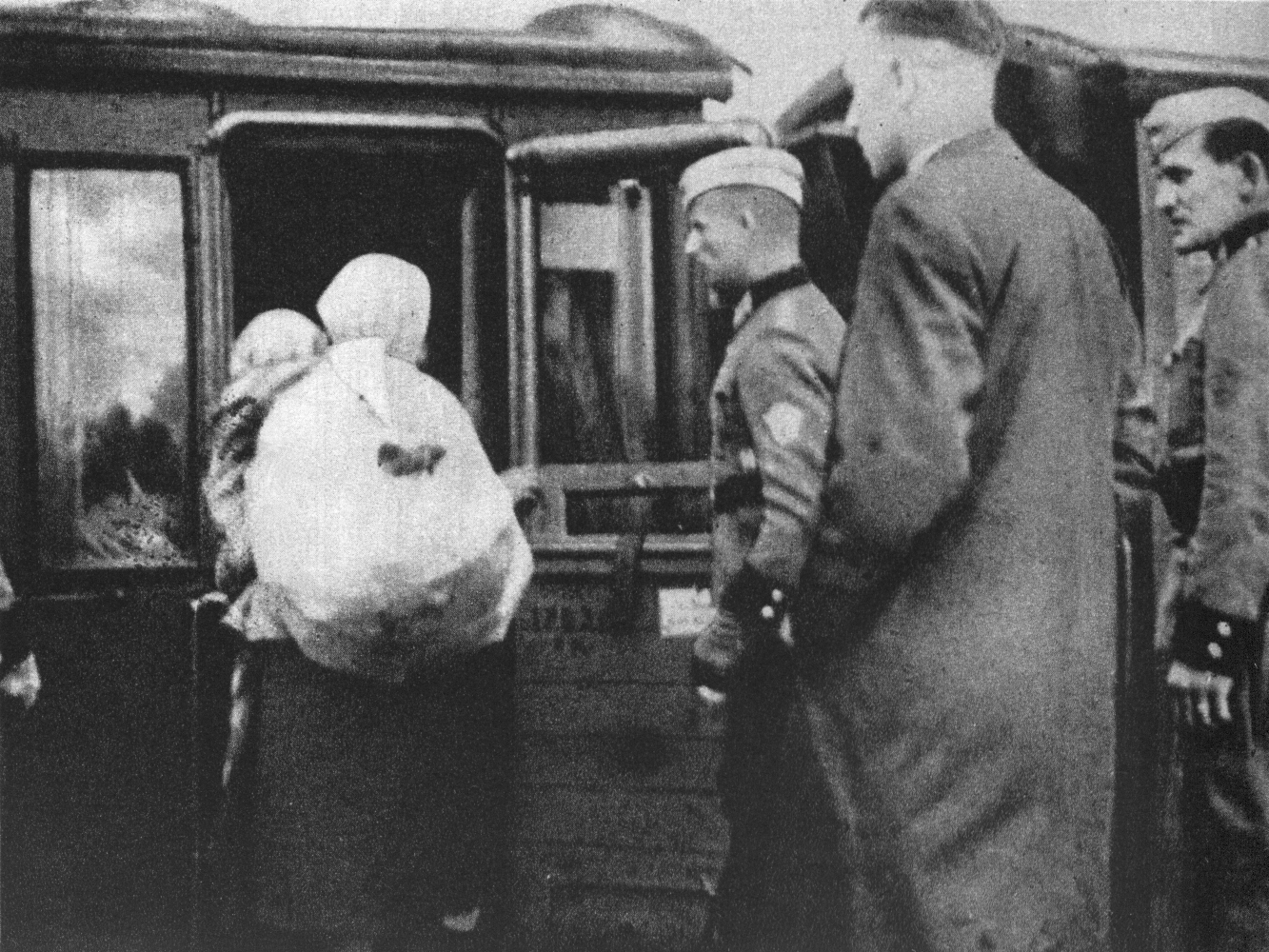
Expulsion of the Goral women with children from the Żywiec County

Aktion Saybusch officially ended on December 12, 1940, although the last transport (out of the total number of 19) was dispatched as late as January 31, 1941. On top of the 18,000–20,000 deportees sent across the border, some 8,000 Gorals employed in local industries were moved away from their homes. It was a pilot project meant to be followed by similar actions, but in March 1941 SS-Obergruppenführer Hans Frank, Governor of General Government, objected to further overcrowding of his district. As a result, from 1942 on, Polish deportees were placed with other farmers in the poorest villages within the same territory of Silesia (Interne Umsiedlung), or sent to one of the new 23 camps called Polenlager, created especially for that purpose. By the end of the war, about 50,000 Polish nationals were displaced from Żywiec and the surrounding area, nearly one-third of its population. In Polenlagers, further selections were carried out, including racial abductions of children from their parents, who after verification were sent to Lebensborn centers for Germanization. The displaced Goral farmers who returned to their homes in 1945 often found buildings razed or destroyed and everything else stolen by the settlers escaping the Soviet advance.

== IPN investigation ==
In the early 1990s, Action Saybusch was investigated by the Commission for the Prosecution of Crimes Against the Polish Nation at the Institute of National Remembrance in Katowice followed by a formal inquiry initiated in 1998 by Senator Władysław Bułka. After a series of announcements in the press, some 1,000 persons contacted IPN with personally collected data and supplementary materials, revealing the identities of many displaced families. According to Ewa Koj from IPN most living victims had already been interviewed. The investigation was limited by their advancing age and had to be discontinued on legal grounds. However, it was followed by a broad exhibit of documents and photographs collected in the process, and presented in many regional cities and towns including Katowice, Żywiec, Bielsko-Biała and others. The Nazi perpetrators of ethnic cleansing had already been sentenced during the Nuremberg trials. The IPN announced that discussing matters of war compensation was not within their mandate, which some living victims found disappointing.

== See also ==
- Heim ins Reich policy pursued by Adolf Hitler
- Expulsion of Poles by Germany lasting nearly half a century
- Reichsgau Wartheland district carved out of Polish territories
- Nazi crimes against the Polish nation
