= Seem =

Seem or variants may refer to:

- Société d'Exploitation des Etablissements Morane-Saulnier (SEEMS or SEEM), the successor company to the French aviation manufacturer Morane-Saulnier
- SeeMS, a mass spectrometry viewer software package
- Seem, Denmark, a parish in Esbjerg Municipality, Denmark
- The Seems, children's novel series by John Hulme
- It Seems (album), 1988 album by Colin Newman
- Seem., taxonomic author abbreviation of, Berthold Carl Seemann (1825–1871), German botanist
- "Seem" Studley (1841–1901), U.S. baseball player

== See also ==
- Seam (disambiguation)
- Seim (disambiguation)
- Seme (disambiguation)
