= Sucha Beskidzka Castle =

- Zamek w Suchej Beskidzkiej (Polish)
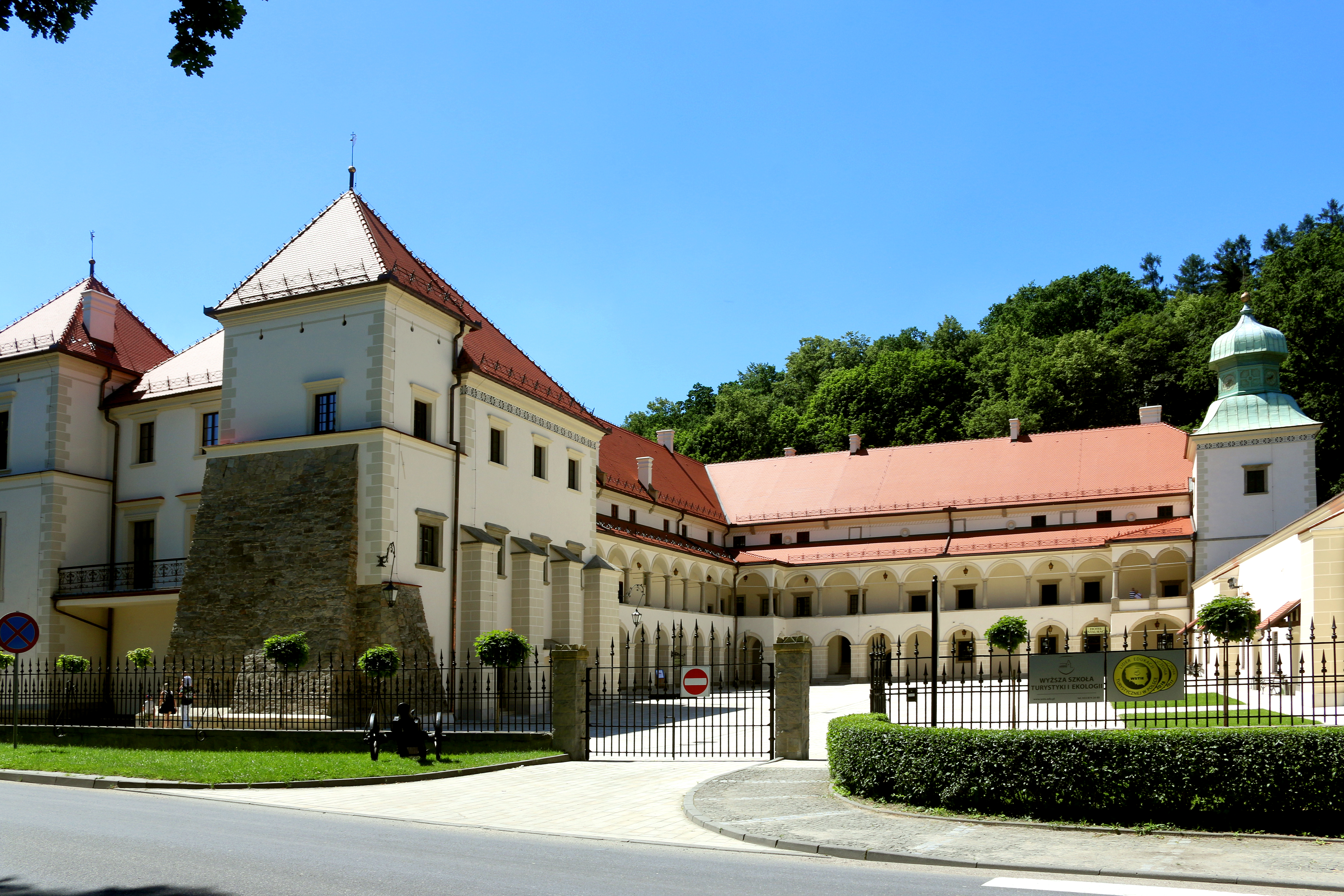
- Sucha Beskidzka Castle in 2020

- Location within Poland Location within Lesser Poland Voivodeship
- 49.746111°N 19.601667°E
- Location: Sucha Beskidzka, Lesser Poland Voivodeship, Poland

History
- Built: 1554–1558
- Built for: Kasper Suski

Site notes
- Owner: Local government

Sucha Beskidzka Castle or Sucha Castle (Polish: Zamek w Suchej Beskidzkiej or Zamek Suski) is a Renaissance castle located in Sucha Beskidzka, Lesser Poland Voivodeship, Poland.

The original manor house in Sucha Beskidzka was built between 1554 and 1558. At the start of the 17th century, it was converted into a castle. Partially modeled after the Wawel Castle, it earned the nickname "Little Wawel". Throughout its history, it was owned by the noble and aristocratic families of Suski, Komorowski, Wielopolski, Branicki, and Tarnowski. A valuable library was located inside the castle. Since 2016, it belongs to the local government and houses several institutions.

== History ==
The first fortified manor house in Sucha Beskidzka was raised in the years 1554–1558 by Kasper Suski. It was built on the left bank of the Stryszawka brook. In the years 1608–1630, the manor was expanded and converted into a castle by the House of Komorowski. The new building was modeled after the Wawel Royal Castle in Kraków, which earned it the nickname "Little Wawel" (Polish: Mały Wawel).

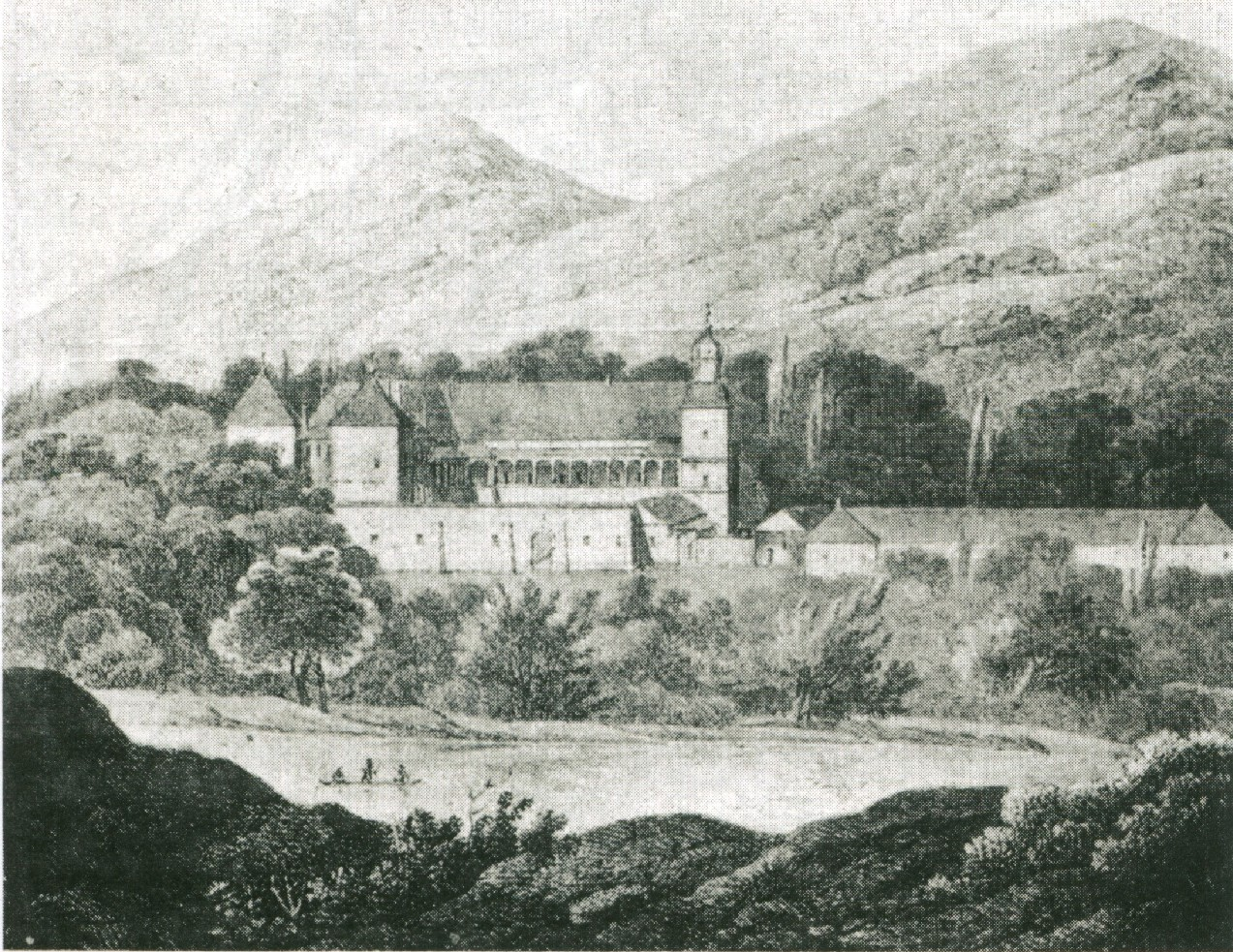
18th-century castle lithography by Louis René Letronne

The castle was surrounded by a curtain wall, enclosing the courtyard on the eastern side. Further changes to the residence's structure were made by the Wielopolski family in the 17th and 18th centuries. Duchess Anna Konstancja z Lubomirskich Wielopolska raised two towers in the southeast wing in 1708, and the castle's interior was redesigned in the Baroque style.

In the 1890s, members of the House of Branicki tore down the curtain wall. A library with collections of books, manuscripts, paintings, sculptures and other national memorabilia valuable to Polish culture was created in the castle. It was referred to as the "Branicki Library". In 1905, the castle suffered a fire. It was rebuilt in 1910 under the supervision of Tadeusz Stryjeński. During the First World War, a Polish Red Cross hospital was set up inside the castle. In November 1914, soldiers of the Polish Legions swore an oath at the castle's coartyard.

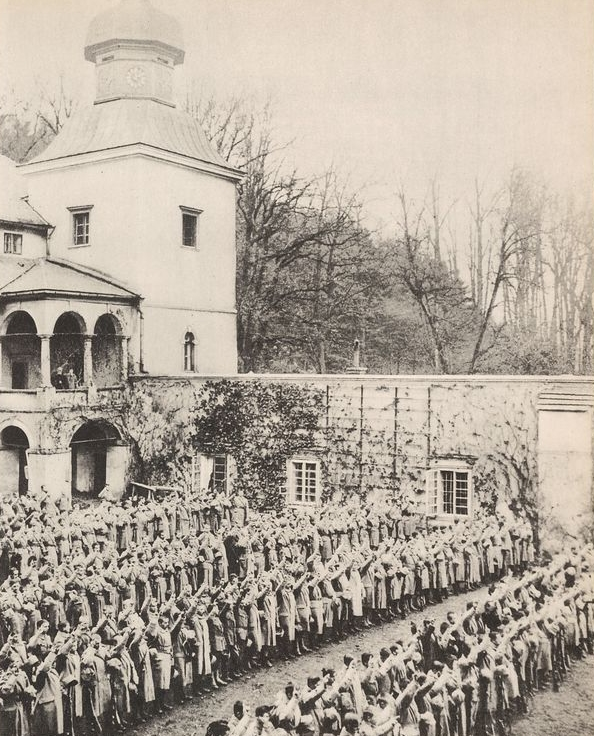
Polish soldiers on the castle's courtyard during World War I

At the start of the Second World War, the last private owner of the castle, Juliusz Tarnowski, emigrated abroad with his family. The residence was first occupied by the Germans and then by the Soviet Red Army. Its architectural elements did not suffer much during the war, but part of the museum's resources and the castle library were stolen or confiscated by the Nazis. The surviving part of the book collection is kept in various libraries and museums in Poland.

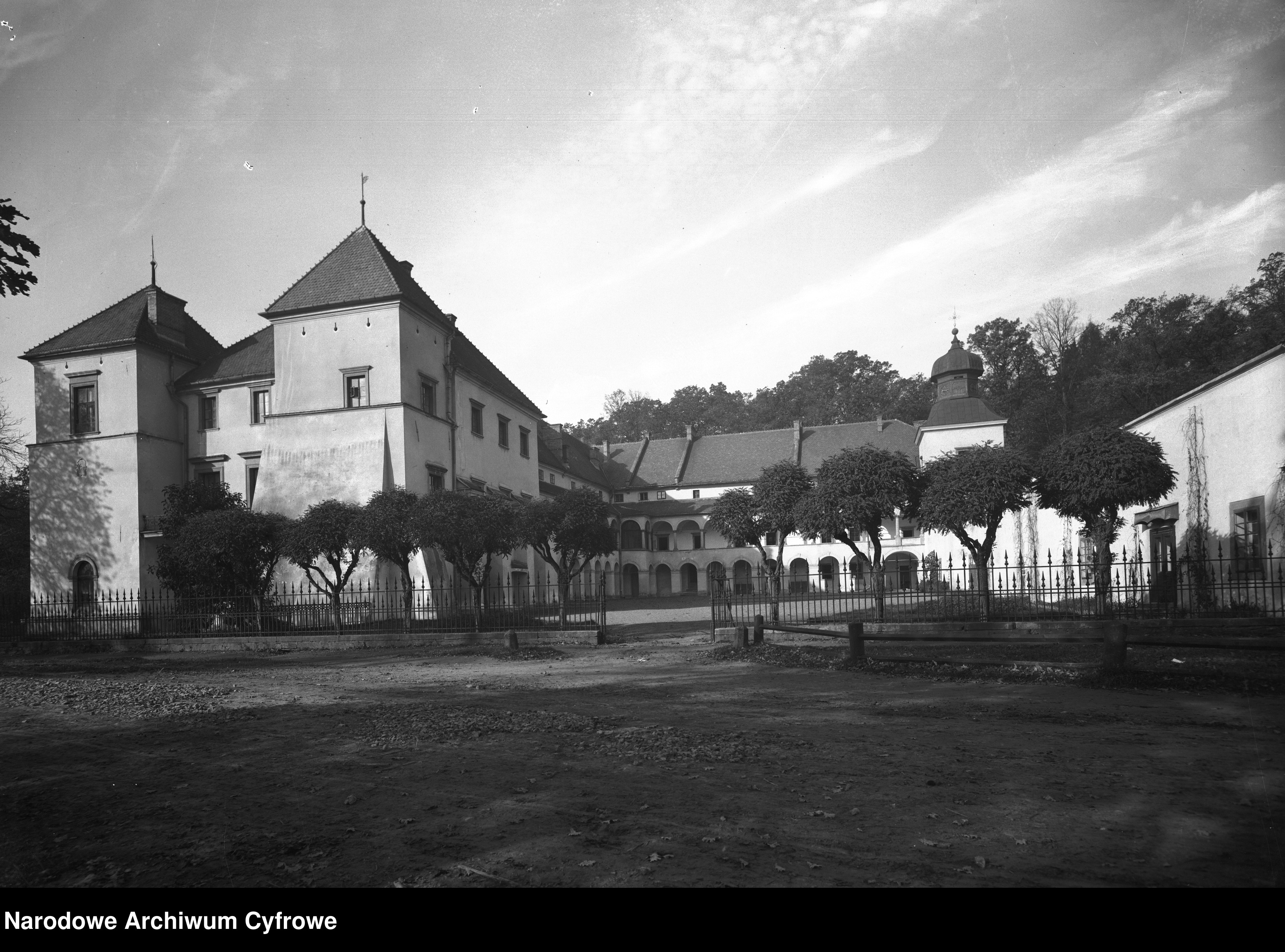
Castle in 1928

Until 1969, the castle housed a secondary school with a boarding house. It also housed a furniture factory and a local cooperative. Starting in 1975, it was supposed to be adapted for museum purposes, but its renovation was halted in 1984. The unsecured and unused building began to fall into ruin.

The building was initially taken over by the local government in 1996, but a court case regarding reprivatization followed. The case was settled in 2015, and the town's government bought the castle from the Tarnowski family in 2016. The castle's exterior was renovated in the years 2017–2018. Since then, the building housed several institutions, such as a Sucha Beskidzka Town Museum, a Tourist Information Point, a University of Tourism and Ecology, a Society of Lovers of the Sucha Land, an Archery Sports Society, and a hotel with a restaurant.

== Architecture ==
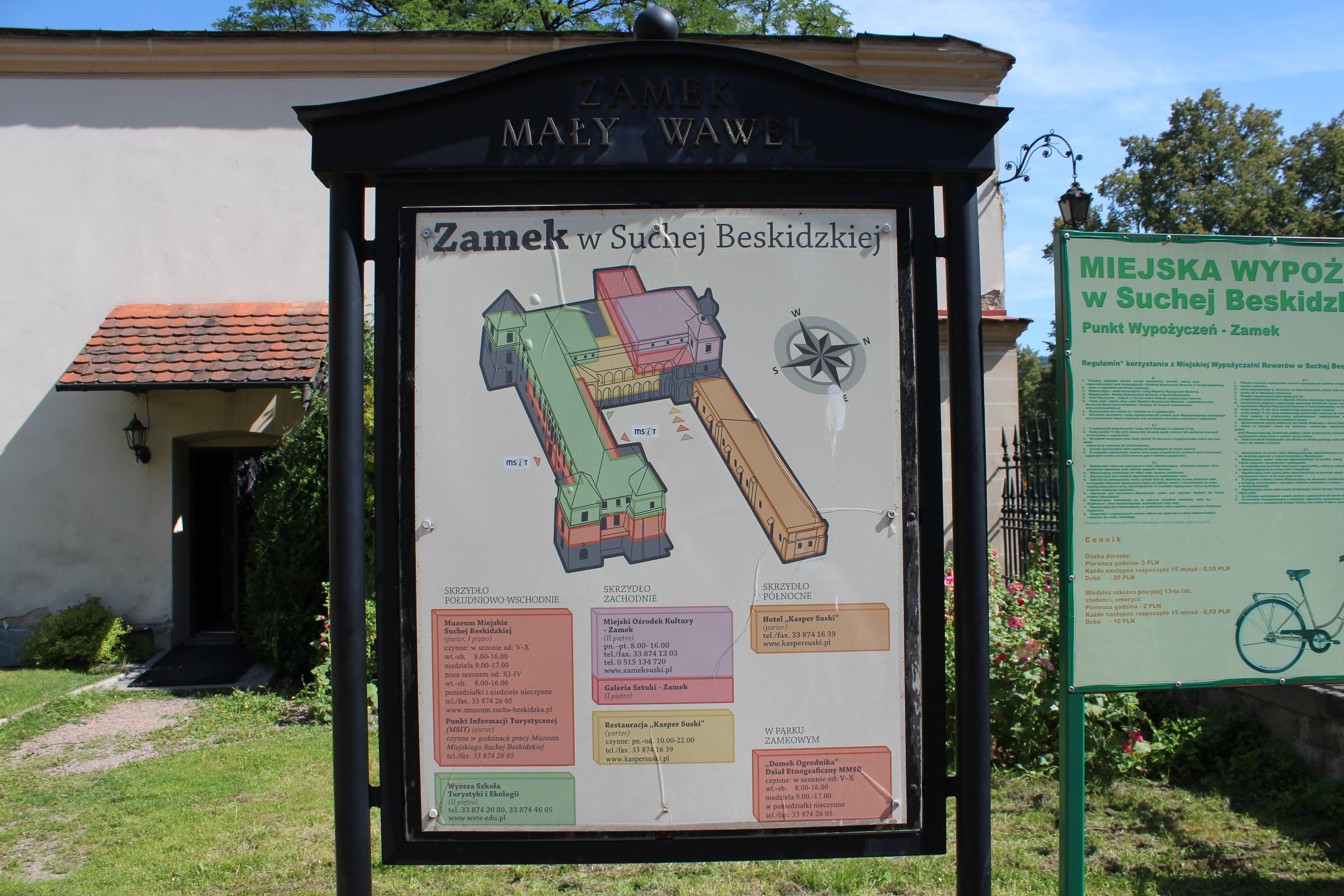
Plan of the castle

The castle complex consists of three castle wings with Renaissance cloisters, a courtyard, two towers, and a park with an orangery. Some of the rooms were opened to the public. The castle houses a regional museum and a University of Tourism and Ecology.

The castle was built of stone and brick. Its wings form a courtyard open to the east, surrounded by two-story, arcaded cloisters in the two-story southern and western wings, each with corner loggias, and a single-story northern wing. The castle has four towers, including a clock tower. The window frames, doors, and arcade bases and arches are made of sandstone. Some details bear the coats of arms of the castle's owners.

=== Interior ===
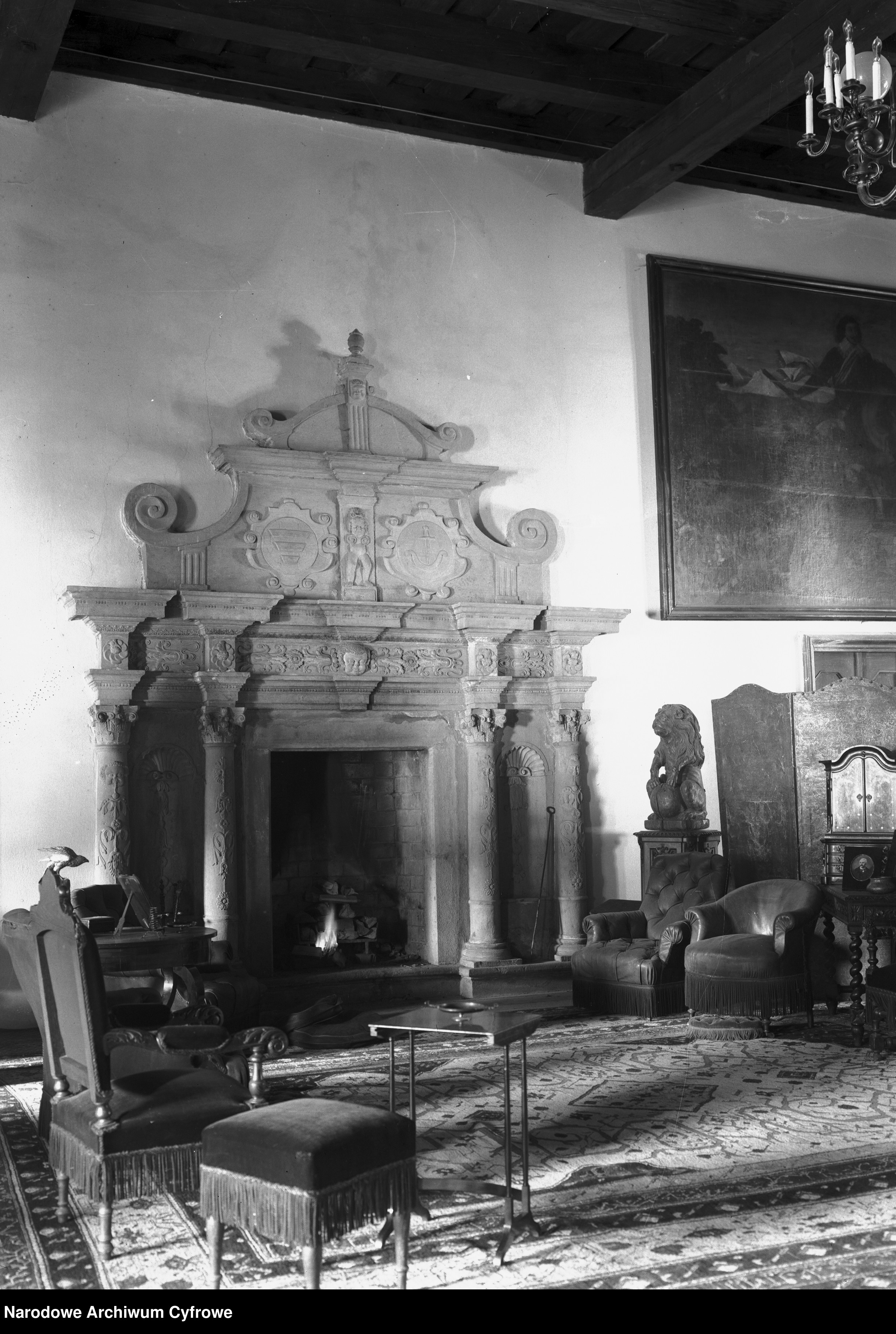
"Knights' Hall" in 1928

Inside the castle, there is a "Knights' Hall" (Polish: Sala Rycerska) and a chapel in the clock tower. A museum is located on the first floor of the south wing. The "Knights' Hall" features a late Renaissance fireplace with the Korczak and Nowina coats of arms.

==== Chapel ====
The interior of the clock tower in the north-west corner of the castle houses a chapel, founded in 1614 by Piotr Komorowski. Its walls used to be decorated by a 17th-century polychrome, but they were painted white in the 19th century. The chapel was renovated in the years 2000–2002, but the polychrome has been preserved only partially.

=== Park ===
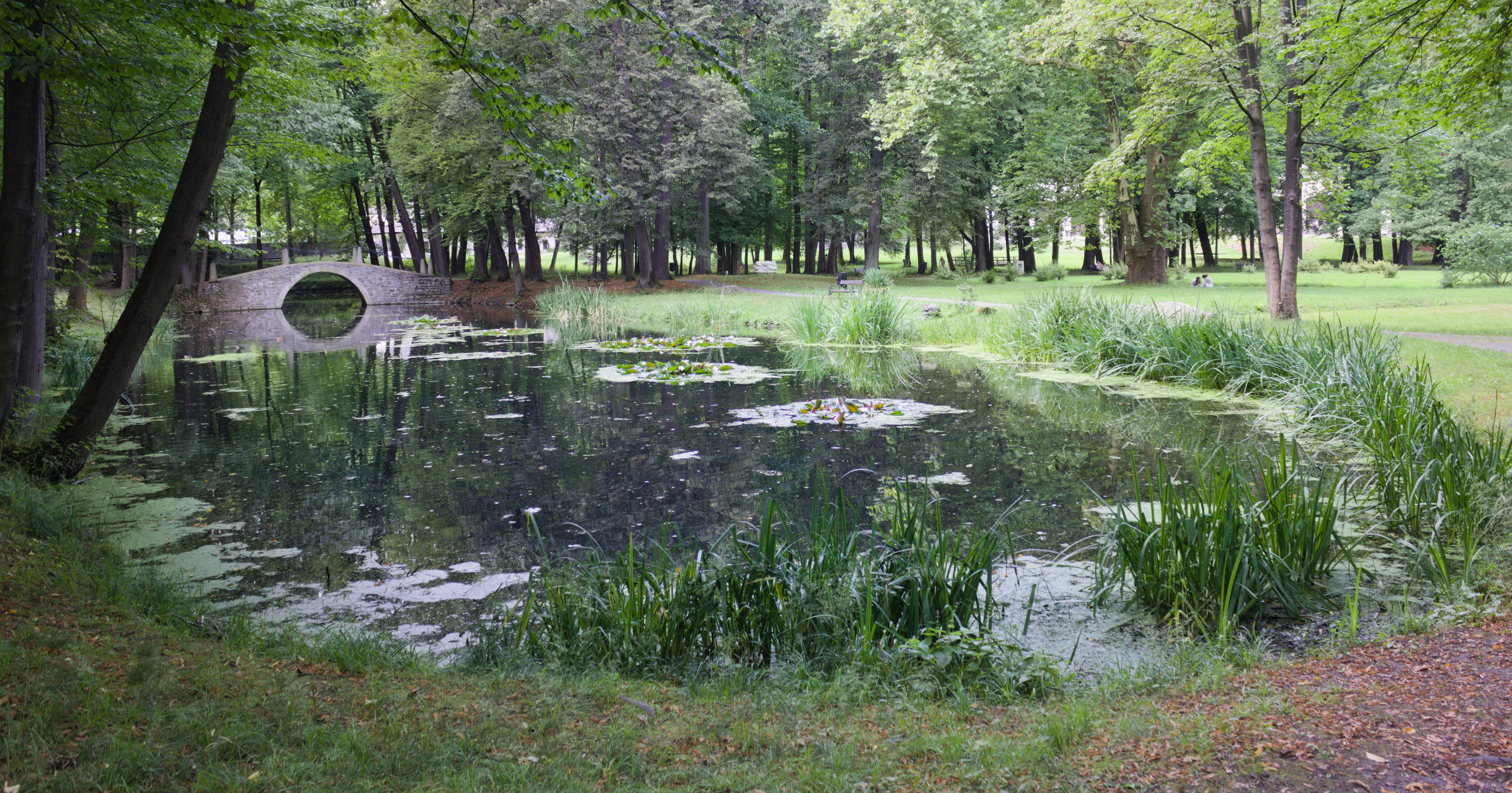
Castle park

On the south side, the castle is adjoined by a park. Around 1708, the park took on the form of a French-style Baroque garden with symmetrically laid out paths. A pond was created in the early 19th century. During the Branicki family's rule, the park took on the characteristics of English gardens, with numerous small bridges.

==== Gardener's House ====
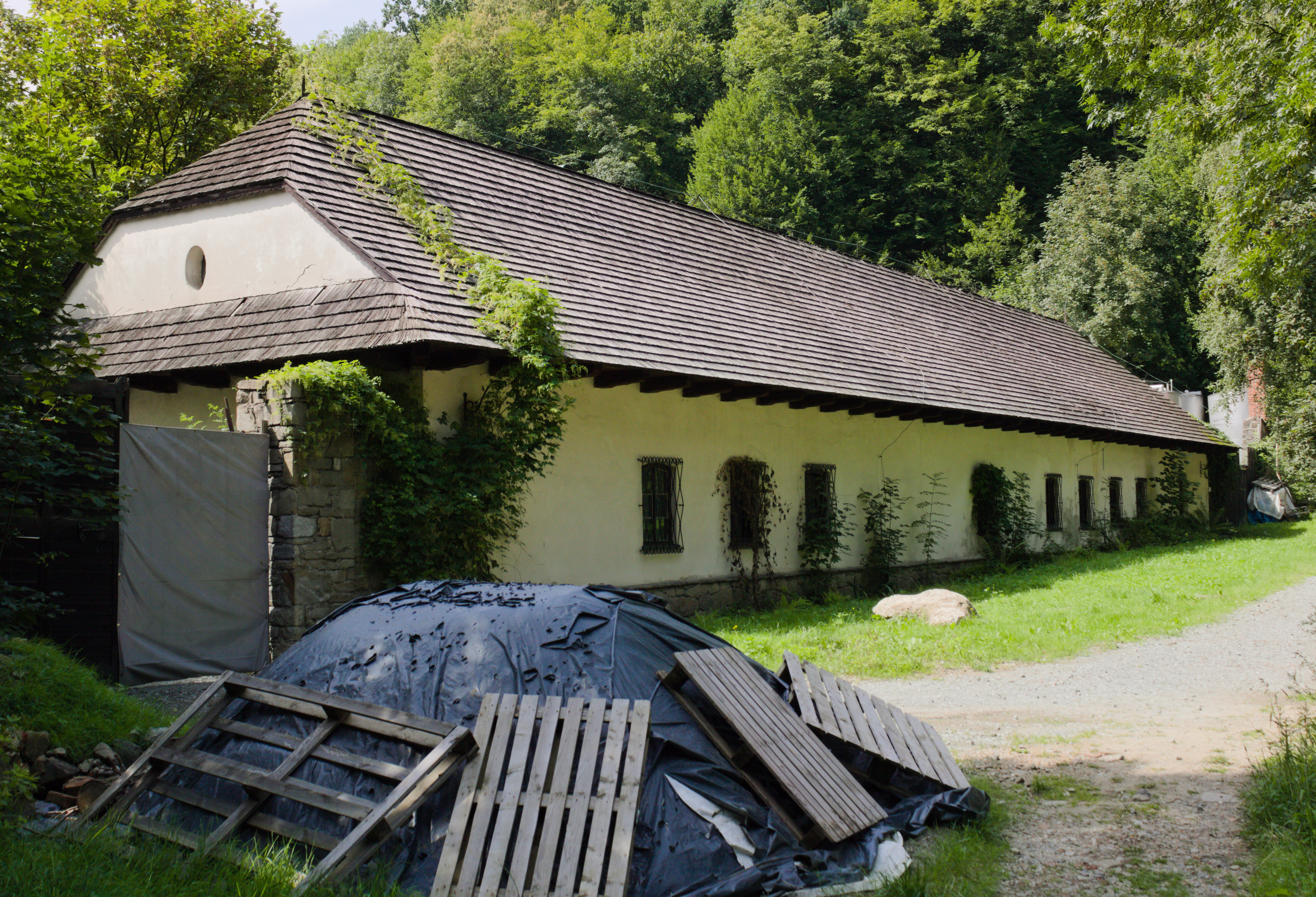
Gardener's House

The Gardener's House (Polish: Domek Ogrodnika) is a long building in the western part of the park, created in the 1970s after a merge of two separate buildings which used to be inhabitet by the castle gardener. It houses an ethnographyc exhibition showcasing the cultural traditions of Babia Góra and Żywiec Gorals.

==== Orangery ====
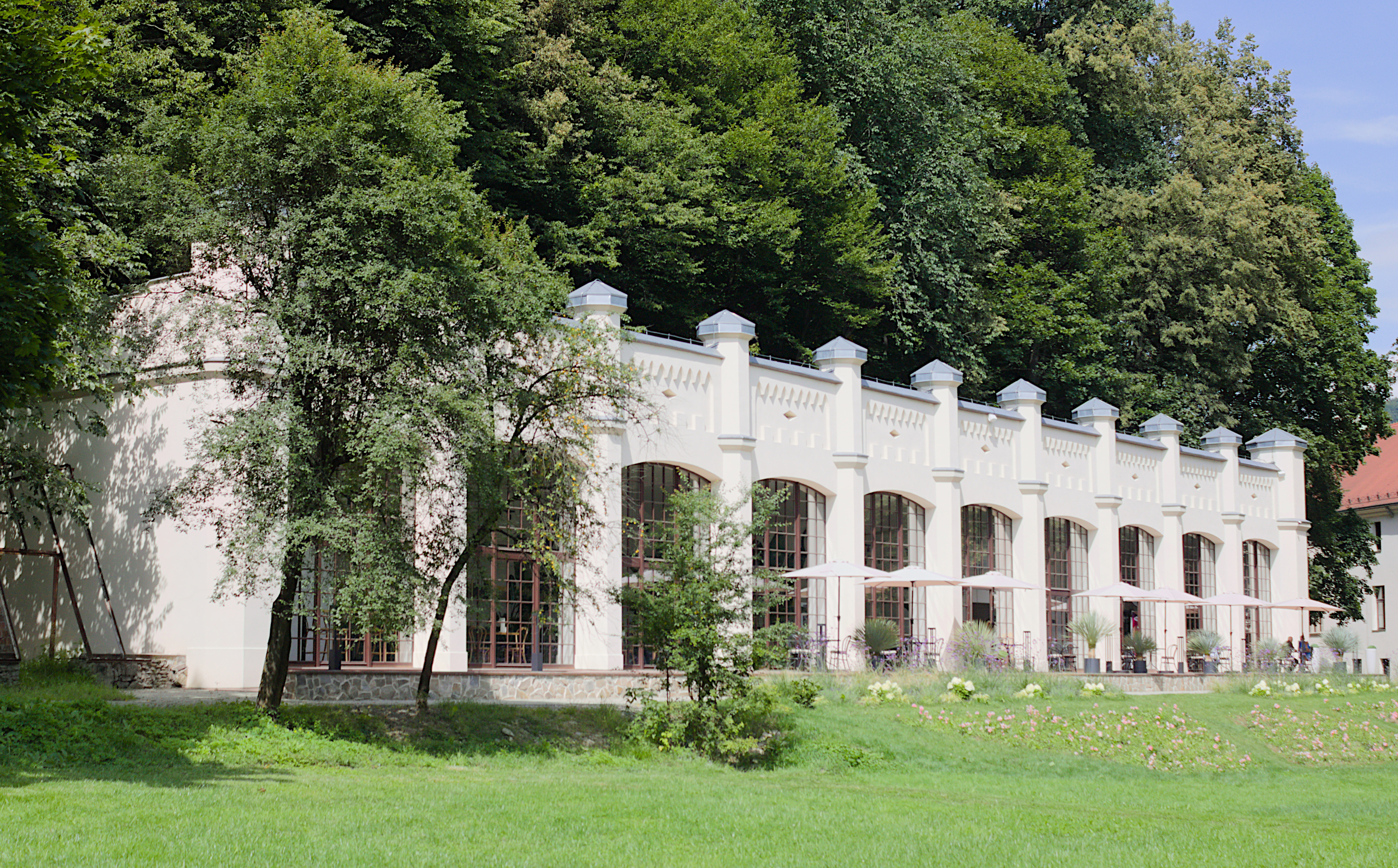
Orangery

The neo-Gothic orangery was constructed in the second half of the 19th century in the castle park. It is one of rare examples of English Gothic Revival architecture in southern Poland. In the past, a flower garden with walking paths and a swimming pool stretched out in front of the building. Inside the orangery, the Branicki family grew various exotic plants and lemon trees, which were later sold at the Kleparz Market Square in Kraków. In the early 20th century, a greenhouse was added to the orangery. In 2024, the building was renovated and adapted into a café and bowling alley.

== Gallery ==
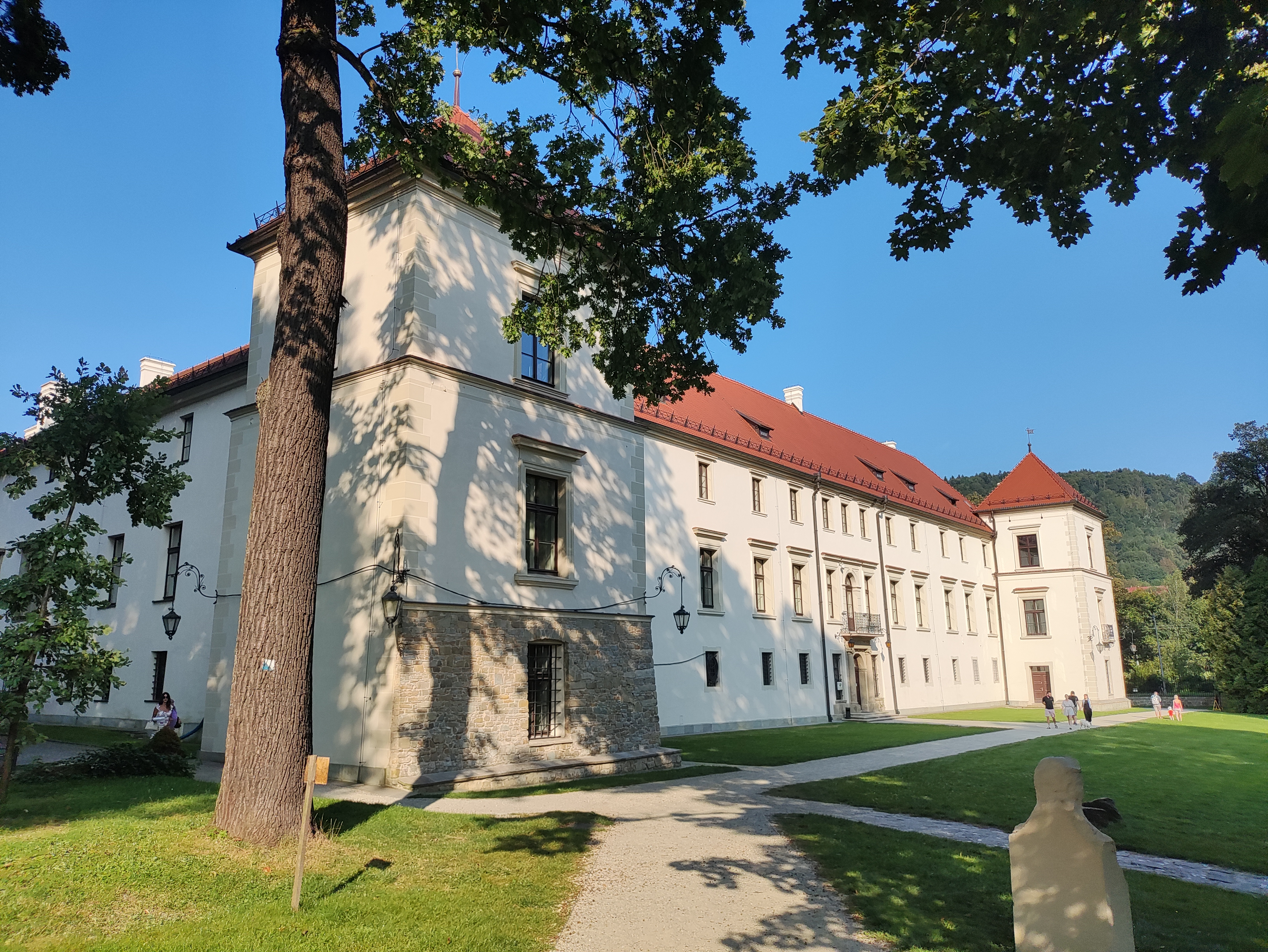
Southern wing (from the park)

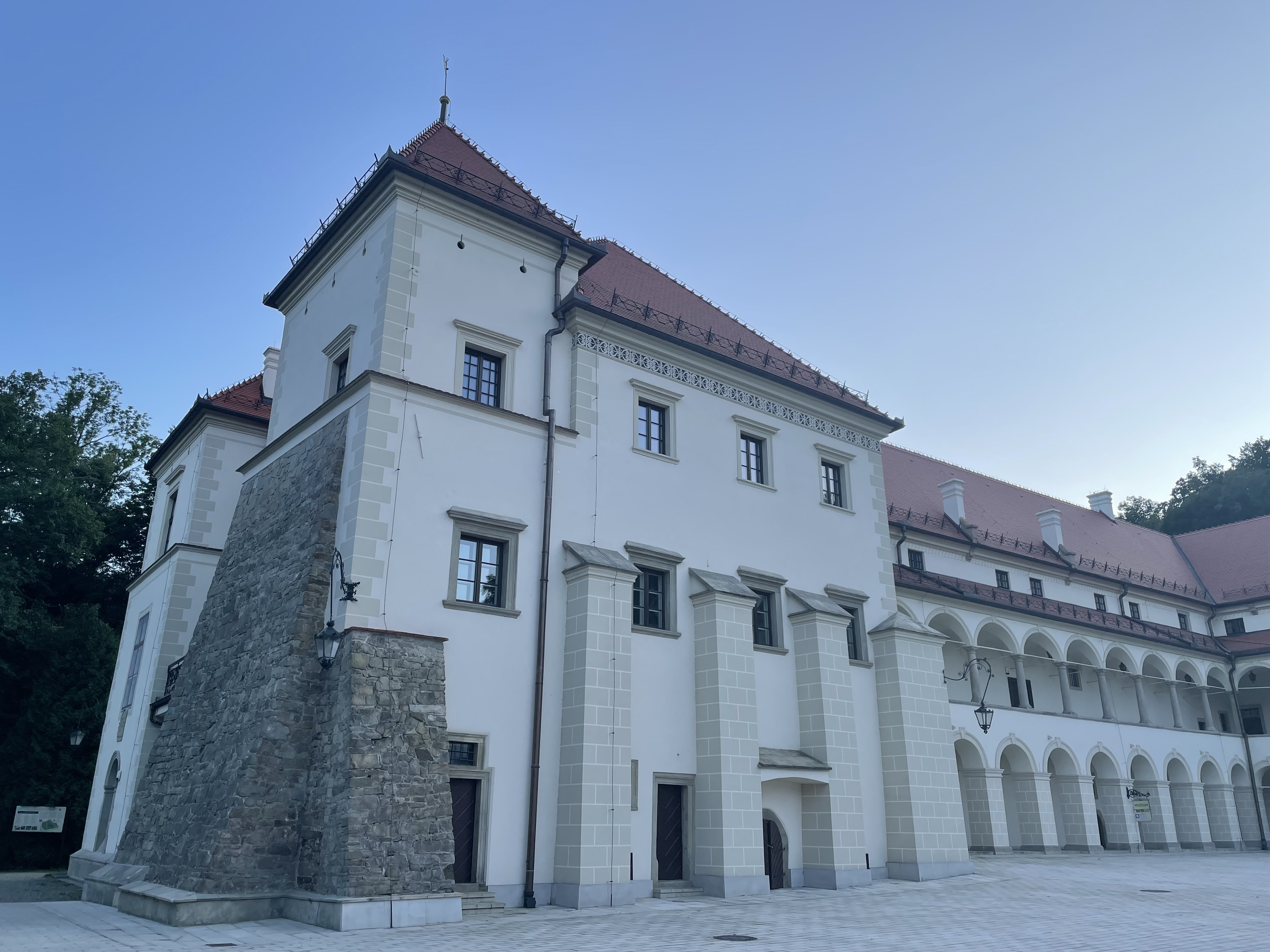
Southern wing (from the courtyard)

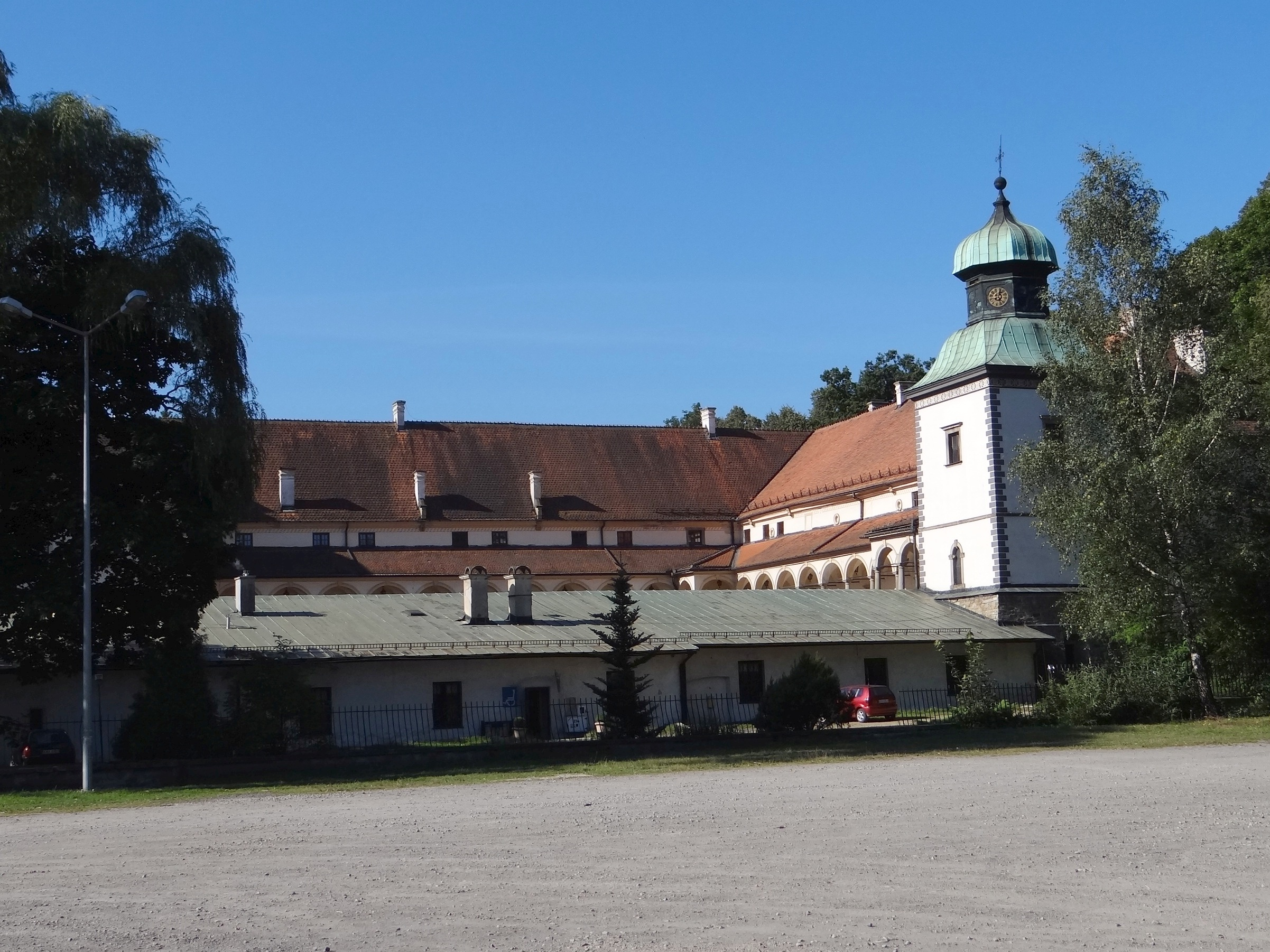
Northern wing

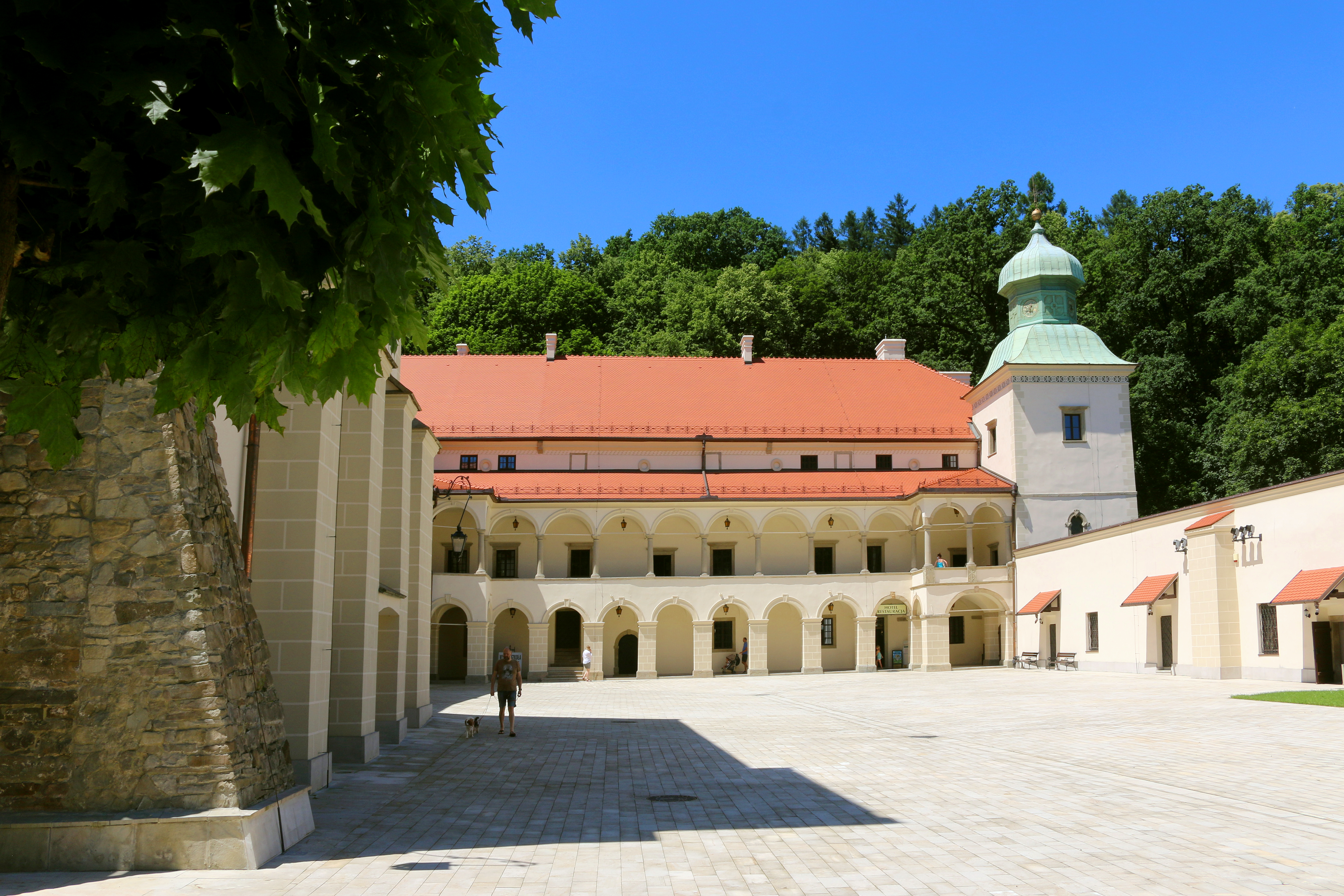
Courtyard
