= Seme =

Seme may refer to:

- Seme Border, a settlement in Nigeria on the border with Benin
- Sèmè City Institute of Technology and Innovation is in Benin's large city Cotonou
- Seme (dagger), a Maasai term for a type of lion hunting knife
- Seme (martial arts), Japanese martial arts term meaning to attack
  - Seme, a manga/anime term for a dominant partner in a homosexual relationship, derived from the martial arts term
- Seme (semantics), a small unit of meaning identified as one characteristic of a sememe
- Pixley ka Isaka Seme (1881?-June 1951) a founding member of the African National Congress
- Semé, a term used in heraldry to describe a field filled with charges
- SEME, an acronym for the search engine manipulation effect
- 8 Training Battalion of the British Army's Royal Electrical and Mechanical Engineers, formerly known as the School of Electrical and Mechanical Engineering (SEME)

== See also ==
- Seam (disambiguation)
- Seim (disambiguation)
