= Bruno Müller =

German SS officer (1905–1960)

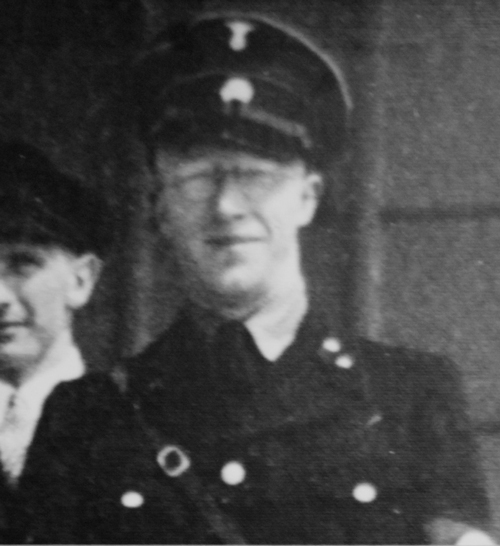
- Born: 13 September 1905; Strasbourg, German Empire
- Died: 1 March 1960 (aged 54); Oldenburg, Lower Saxony, West Germany
- Military career
- Allegiance: Nazi Germany
- Branch: Schutzstaffel
- Service years: until 1945
- Rank: SS-Obersturmbannführer
- Units: SS-Totenkopfverbände; Einsatzgruppe I Einsatzgruppe D
- Commands: Generalgouvernement; Einsatzkommando 2/I; Einsatzkommando 11b

Bruno Müller or Brunon Müller-Altenau (13 September 1905 – 1 March 1960) served as an SS-Obersturmbannführer during the Nazi German invasion of Poland. In September 1939, he was put in charge of the Einsatzkommando 2, attached to Einsatzgruppe I (pl) of the Security Police. They were deployed in Poland along with the 14th Army of the Wehrmacht.

== Paramilitary posts ==
Müller was head of the Gestapo office (Geheimstaatspolizei) in Oldenburg from 1935 until World War II. During the invasion of Poland, he served as one of four captains of the mobile killing squads (Einsatzkommandos) within Einsatzgruppe I, led by SS-Brigadeführer Bruno Streckenbach. In total, eight Einsatzgruppen (German: special-ops units) had been deployed in Poland. They were active until late 1940, and composed of the Gestapo, Kripo and SD functionaries involved in extermination actions, including Operation Tannenberg as well as Intelligenzaktion against the Polish cultural elites. Müller was appointed commander of the Gestapo Division 4 Krakau in the new General Government district (Generalgouvernement) two months after the attack.

=== Sonderaktion Krakau ===
Müller personally conducted the operation Sonderaktion Krakau against the Polish professors in occupied Kraków. On 6 November 1939, at the Jagiellonian University (UJ) lecture room no. 56 of the Collegium Novum, he summoned all academics for a speech, where he announced their immediate arrest and internment. Among them were 105 professors and 33 lecturers from the Jagiellonian University, including its rector Tadeusz Lehr-Spławiński, 34 professors and doctors from Academy of Mining and Metallurgy (AGH), 4 from College of Commerce (Wyższe Studium Handlowe) and 4 from Lublin and Wilno universities, as well as the President of Kraków, Dr Stanisław Klimecki who was apprehended at home. All of them, 184 persons in total, were transported to prison at Montelupich, and – some three days later – to detention center in Wrocław (German: Breslau). They were sent to Sachsenhausen concentration camp on the other side of Berlin two weeks later, and in March 1940 further to Dachau near Munich after a new 'selection'.

Following international protest involving prominent Italians including Benito Mussolini and the Vatican, surviving prisoners older than 40, were released on 8 February 1940. More academics were released later. However, over a dozen died in captivity, including Stanisław Estreicher, and several others right after their return, owing to emaciation.

=== Einsatzkommando 11b ===
Müller briefly served as the RKF chief of staff in Silesia in late 1940, replaced by SS-Obersturmbannführer Fritz Arlt in preparation for the Action Saybusch in Żywiec. Soon later, following the German attack on the Soviet Union, Müller was selected as leader of the Einsatzkommando "11b" attached to the 11th Army of the Wehrmacht. He operated along with the entire Einsatzgruppe D (consisting of 600 men) in the territory of Crimea in southern Ukraine. From there, they went to Southern Bessarabia and the Caucasus. His Einsatzgruppe D mobile killing unit (term used by Holocaust historians), of which Einsatzkommando 11b was a part, became responsible for the murder of over 90,000 people, an average of 340 to 700 victims per day. Müller's activities in the region are not as well-documented as those of some other Nazi leaders. At the beginning of August 1941, he led the unit that massacred about 155 Jews, including women and children in the city of Bender in Moldova. Müller, who was a heavy drinker, insisted that to be trusted, every one of his men first had to burn "the bridges to respectable society" by committing murder at least once. One account tells of how he modelled the killing process by shooting a two-year-old child and the child's mother, then told his officers to follow his example.

"First […] Müller approached a Jewish woman who had a three-year-old child on her arm and who had been brought forward by someone […] and said something like this: 'You must die so that we can live.' Then he drew his pistol and shot first the child and then the woman."

In October 1941, four months after the commencement of Operation Barbarossa, Müller was replaced as leader of Einsatzkommando "11b" by SS-Obersturmbannführer Werner Braune, who was later named by Commander Otto Ohlendorf in his killing tally sent to Berlin. Müller served as the KdS of Rouen, Prague and Kiel before the end of the war. He was detained by the Allies in June 1945.

In late 1947, Müller and eight others were tried as war criminals by a British military court for crimes committed at the Kiel-Hassee camp in Nordmark, where 578 prisoners died between May 1944 and the end of the war. Müller was charged since his position as the local head of the security police in the area gave him command responsibility for all crimes committed there. Since Müller was not directly involved in the abuse or killings of prisoners, and the court was unaware of his crimes in Poland at the time, he was spared execution, unlike two of his codefendants and instead sentenced to 20 years in prison. However, he was released from prison in 1953 due to amnesty laws.

In 1952, a French military court sentenced Müller to death in absentia for his responsibility for crimes committed at Rouen. Polish authorities also sought to have him punished for crimes he committed as the leader of EK 2/I in Poland. However, West German authorities never prosecuted him. Müller worked as a salesman for the rest of his life and died in 1960, at the age of 54.

== Film portrayal ==
Müller's activities in occupied Kraków were portrayed in the 2007 film Katyń by Andrzej Wajda
