= Fritz Arlt =

The SS-Obersturmbannführer Fritz Arlt (12 April 1912 in Niedercunnersdorf – 21 April 2004 in Seeg) was a key figure in the implementation of Nazi German racial policy in Leipzig, before moving his operation to occupied Polish eastern part of Upper Silesia region during World War II. He took over his post from SS-Obersturmbannführer Brunon Müller from RKF, in preparation for the forcible displacement of some 18,000–20,000 Polish nationals from around Żywiec, known as Action Saybusch.

In November 1940, long before the Wannsee Conference of 1942, Fritz Arlt proposed the enlargement of the KZ Auschwitz concentration camp for "evacuating" the Polish Jews in there from across the Generalgouvernement.
