= Gmina Rajcza =

Gmina Rajcza Rajcza Commune
- Gmina
- Coat of arms

- Coordinates (Rajcza): 49°30′25″N 19°6′27″E
- Country: Poland
- Voivodeship: Silesian
- County: Żywiec
- Seat: Rajcza

Area
  - Total: 131.17 km^{2} (50.65 sq mi)

Population (2019-06-30)
  - Total: 8,835
  - Density: 67.36/km^{2} (174.4/sq mi)
- Website: http://www.rajcza.com.pl

Gmina Rajcza is a rural gmina (administrative district) in Żywiec County, Silesian Voivodeship, in southern Poland, on the Slovak border. Its seat is the village of Rajcza, which lies approximately 22 kilometres (14 mi) south of Żywiec and 83 km (52 mi) south of the regional capital Katowice.

The gmina covers an area of 131.17 square kilometres (50.6 sq mi), and as of 2019 its total population is 8,835.

== Villages ==
Gmina Rajcza contains the villages and settlements of Rajcza, Rycerka Dolna, Rycerka Górna, Sól, Sól-Kiczora and Zwardoń.

== Neighbouring gminas ==
Gmina Rajcza is bordered by the gminas of Istebna, Milówka and Ujsoły. It also borders Slovakia.

== Twin towns – sister cities ==
Gmina Rajcza is twinned with:

- Košařiska, Czech Republic
- Łobez, Poland
