= Seamless =

Seamless may refer to:

- Seamless (company), an online food ordering company
- "Seamless", a 2015 song by Sabrina Carpenter from Eyes Wide Open
- "Seamless", a song by American Head Charge from the 1999 album Trepanation and the 2001 album The War of Art
- Seamless branching, a DVD technology
- Seamless garment, an abortion-related phrase referencing Jesus' robe
- Seamless Garment Network, an organization founded in 1987 that opposes abortion, capital punishment, assisted suicide, and euthanasia
- Seamless robe of Jesus, the robe said to have been worn by Jesus during (or shortly before) his crucifixion
- Seamless Rate Adaptation, ITU G.992.3/4, a telecommunication standard
- Seamless3d modelling, open source 3D modeling software

== See also ==
- Seam (disambiguation)
- Seemless
