= Seim =

Seim may refer:

- Seim language, a Sepik language of Papua New Guinea
- Lablab, a legume vegetable sometimes called seim

== Places ==
- Seim, Vestland, a village in Alver municipality, Vestland county, Norway
- Seimsdalen, a valley in Årdal municipality, Vestland county, Norway
- Seim River, or Seym, a river in Ukraine

== People ==
- Eugen Seim (1896–1943), a Nazi German officer during World War II
- Gotskalk Mathiassen Seim (born 1818), a Norwegian politician
- Gunhild Seim (born 1973), a Norwegian jazz musician and composer
- Mart Seim (born 1990), an Estonian weightlifter
- Spencer Seim (born 1981), an American guitarist in the band Hella
- Trond Espen Seim (born 1971), a Norwegian actor
- Trygve Seim, a Norwegian jazz saxophonist and composer
- Turid Karlsen Seim (1945–2016), Norwegian professor of theology

== See also ==
- Saeima
- Seam (disambiguation)
- Seem (disambiguation)
- SEM (disambiguation)
- Seimas
- Sejm
- SIEM
