= Sól-Kiczora =

- Village
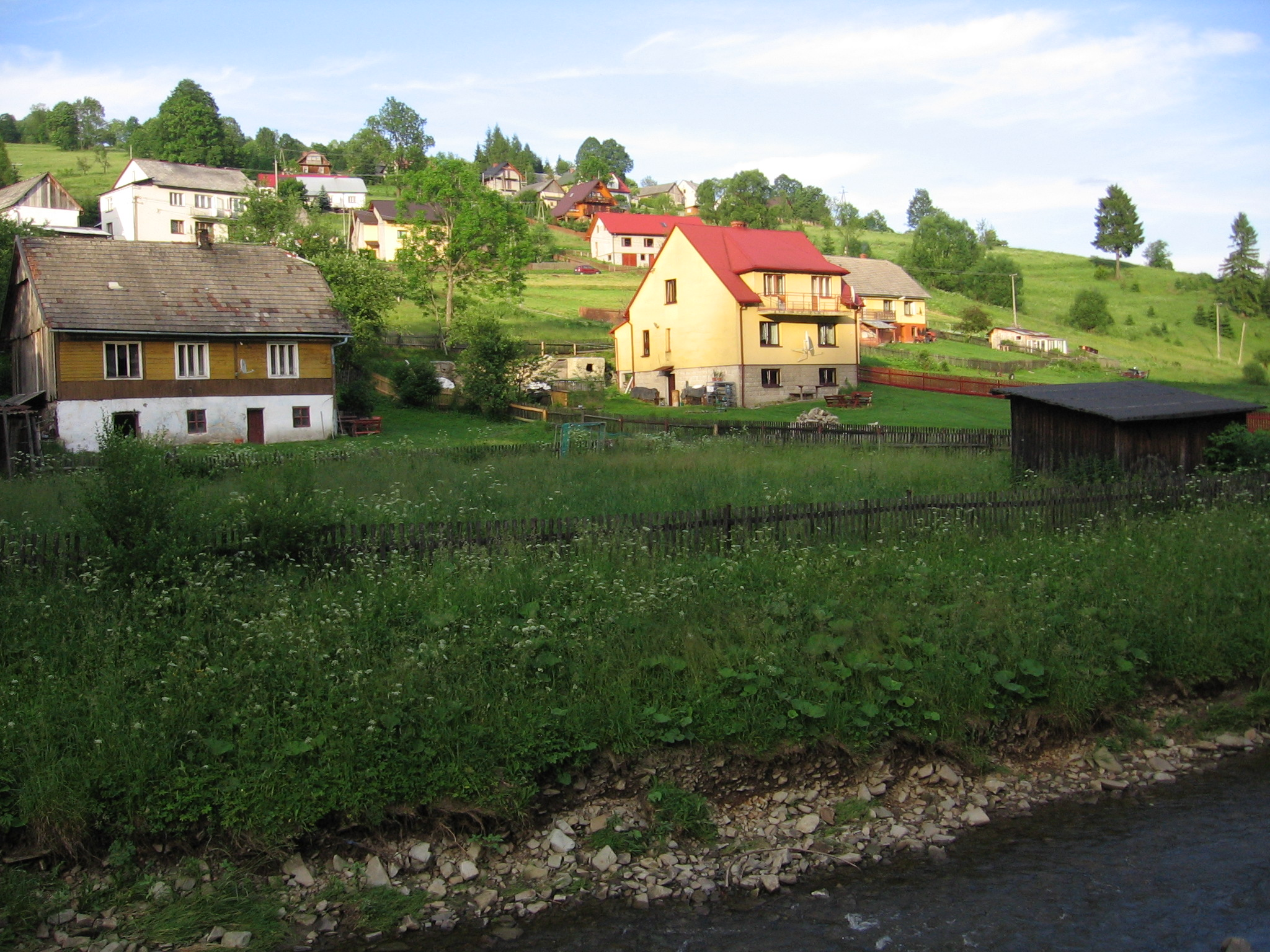

- Location within Poland
- Coordinates: 49°31′15″N 19°1′55″E
- Country: Poland
- Voivodeship: Silesian
- County: Żywiec
- Gmina: Rajcza
- Highest elevation: 670 m (2,200 ft)
- Lowest elevation: 550 m (1,800 ft)

Sól-Kiczora [kiˈt͡ʂɔra] (previously Kiczora) is a village in the administrative district of Gmina Rajcza, within Żywiec County, Silesian Voivodeship, in southern Poland, close to the border with Slovakia.

Until 1 January 2014 Sól-Kiczora constituted integral part of the village Sól.
