= Expressway S69 (Poland) =

Former expressway in Poland that connected Bielsko-Biała with Polish–Slovak border

Expressway S69
- Droga ekspresowa S69

Route information
- Status: Became a portion of Expressway S1
- Existed: 2001–4 August 2016

Major junctions
- From: S 1 near Bielsko-Biała
- DW 942 in Bielsko-Biała; DW 946 in Żywiec
- To: Polish–Slovak border at Zwardoń

Location
- Country: Poland
- Major cities: Bielsko-Biała

Highway system
- National roads in Poland; Voivodeship roads

Expressway S69 or express road S69 (Polish: droga ekspresowa S69) was a major road in Poland which was supposed to run from Bielsko-Biała to the border with Slovakia at Zwardoń/Skalité, where it would connect with Slovak motorway D3. In the original plans, from Bielsko-Biała to Żywiec, the road was to be a dual carriageway with the remaining part to the border with Slovakia a single carriageway only (with terrain reserves for construction of second carriageway in future).

On 4 August 2016, the S69 became part of Expressway S1 when it was rerouted; the old route of S1 became Expressway S52.

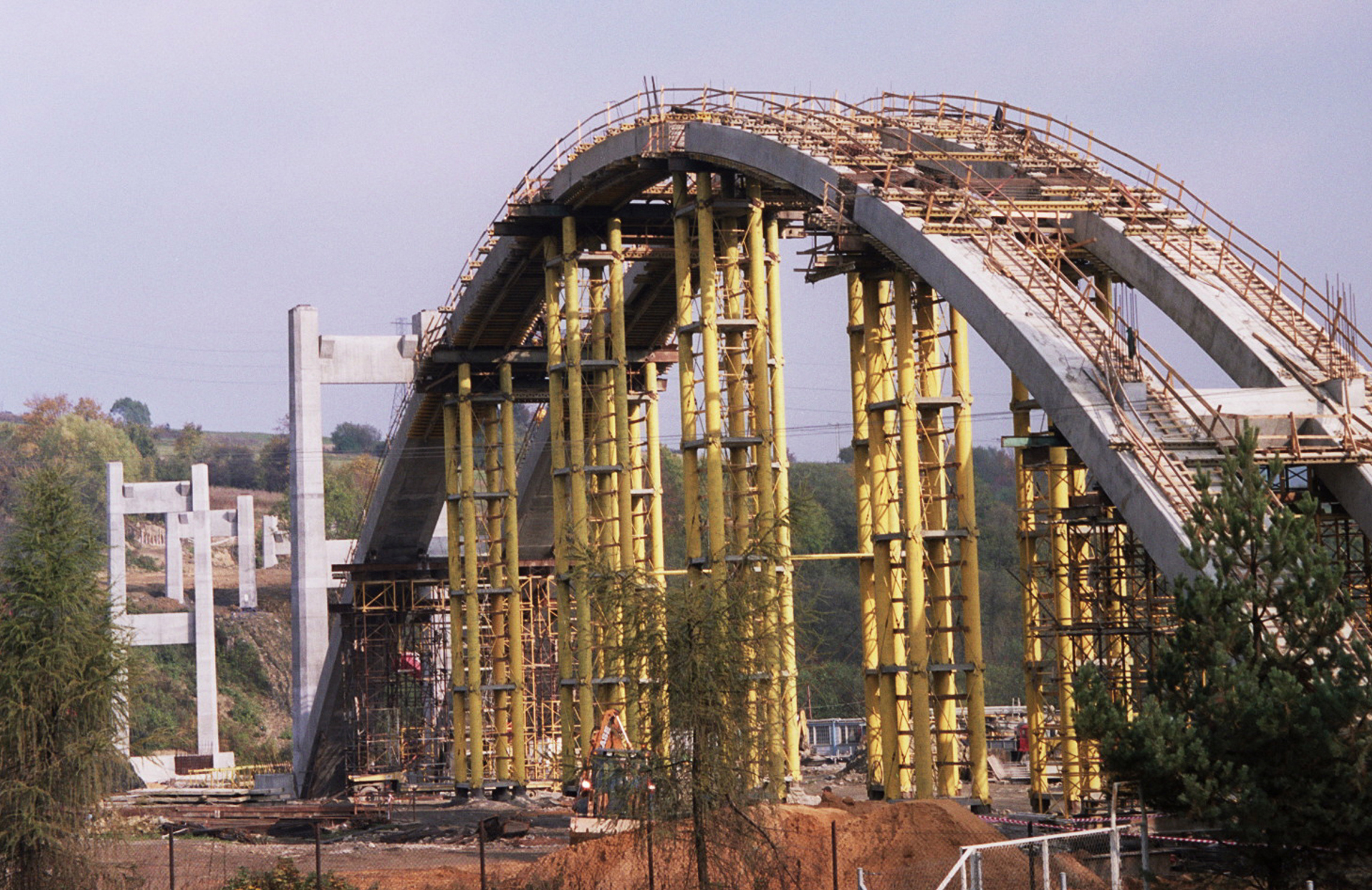
S69 construction near Milówka, 2005

== Route description ==
Number of exit(facility)	Name	Mileage from beginning	History of construction	Notes
1)	Bielsko-Biała-Komorowice	0 km	Works from here to Suchy Potok interchange were allowed in May 2009	To Suchy Potok interchange concurrency with, western terminus
2)	Bielsko-Biała-Rosty	2.9 km (1.80 mi)	Works from here to Suchy Potok interchange were allowed in May 2009	
3)	Suchy Potok(planned)	4.5 km (2.80 mi)	Contract was signed in October 2008 to the Bielsko-Biała-Mikuszowice-II interchange	planned have an interchange here
4)	Bielsko-Biała-Lipnik	6.8 km (4.23 mi)	Contract was signed in October 2008 to the Bielsko-Biała-Mikuszowice-II interchange	
5)	Bielsko-Biała-Mikuszowice-I	10.8 km (6.71 mi)	Contract was signed in October 2008 to the Bielsko-Biała-Mikuszowice-II interchange	
6)	Bielsko-Biała-Mikuszowice-II	11.5 km (7.15 mi)	Contract was signed in October 2008 to the Bielsko-Biała-Mikuszowice-II interchange	
7)	No name	14.2 km (8.82 mi)	From here to Żywiec interchange: first contract signed in 2010, which was cancelled two years later, and signed with other company in July 2014. Done in July 2015.	
8)	No name (Rybarzowice)	17.7 km (11.00 mi)	From here to Żywiec interchange: first contract signed in 2010, which was cancelled two years later, and signed with other company in July 2014. Done in July 2015.	
9)	No name(Kalki)	21 km (13.05 mi)	From here to Żywiec interchange: first contract signed in 2010, which was cancelled two years later, and signed with other company in July 2014. Done in July 2015.	
10)	Żywiec	26.5 km (16.47 mi)	From here to Przybędza interchange: signed in June 2005, done by November 2006	
11)	Browar	29.2 km (18.14 mi)	From here to Przybędza interchange: signed in June 2005, done by November 2006	
12)	Przybędza	33.9 km (21.06 mi)	Section to be completed in August 2023	
13)	Milówka	42.14 km (26.18 mi)	Section to be completed in August 2023	
14)	Kasperka	46.84 km (29.11 mi)		No exit of eastbound traffic on the road
15)	Laliki	49.54 km (30.78 mi)		Last interchange before border
	Zwardoń	53.34 km (33.14 mi)		Entrance to Slovakia

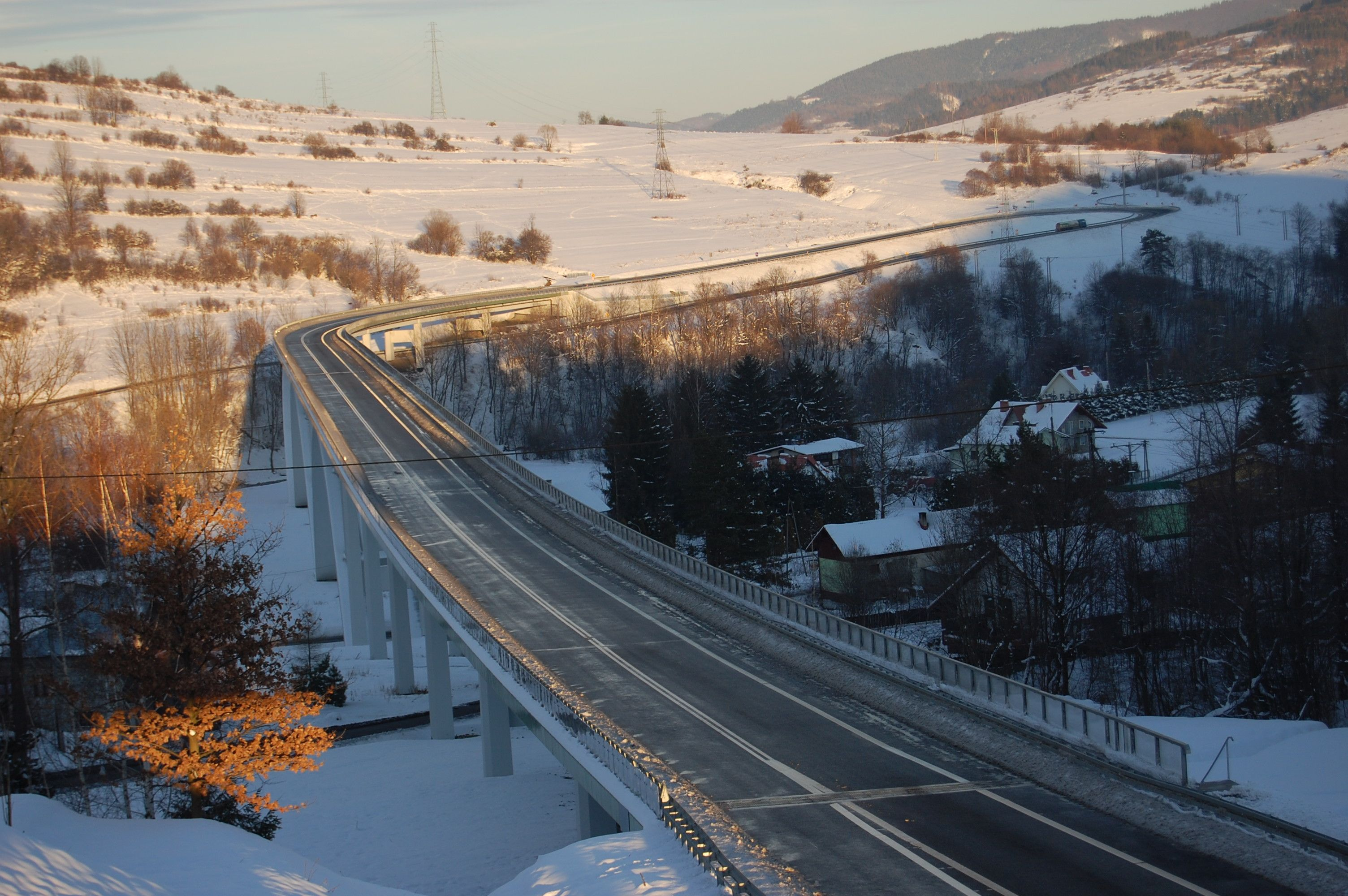
Viaduct over Kameszniczanka valley

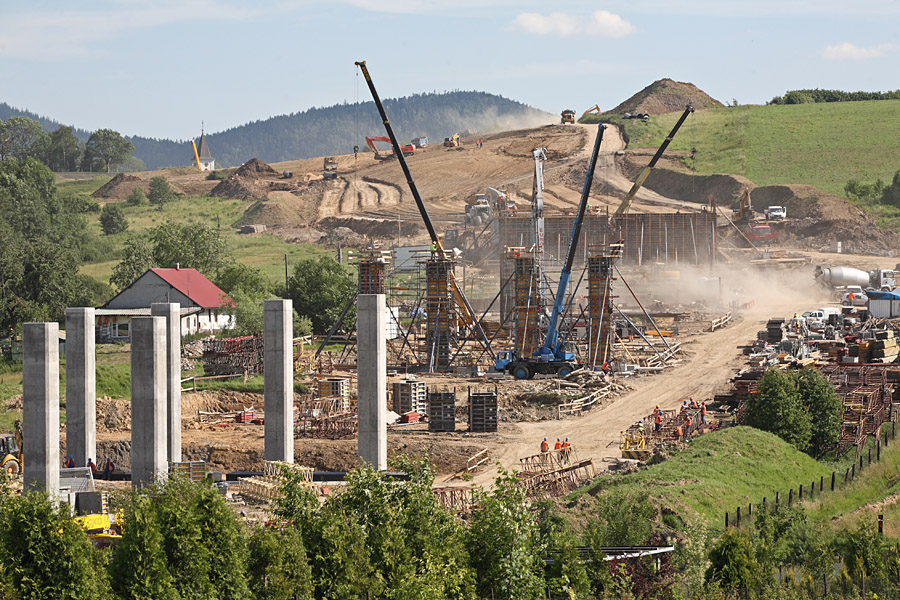
Construction near Bielsko-Biała, July 2009
