= Rycerka Górna =

- Village
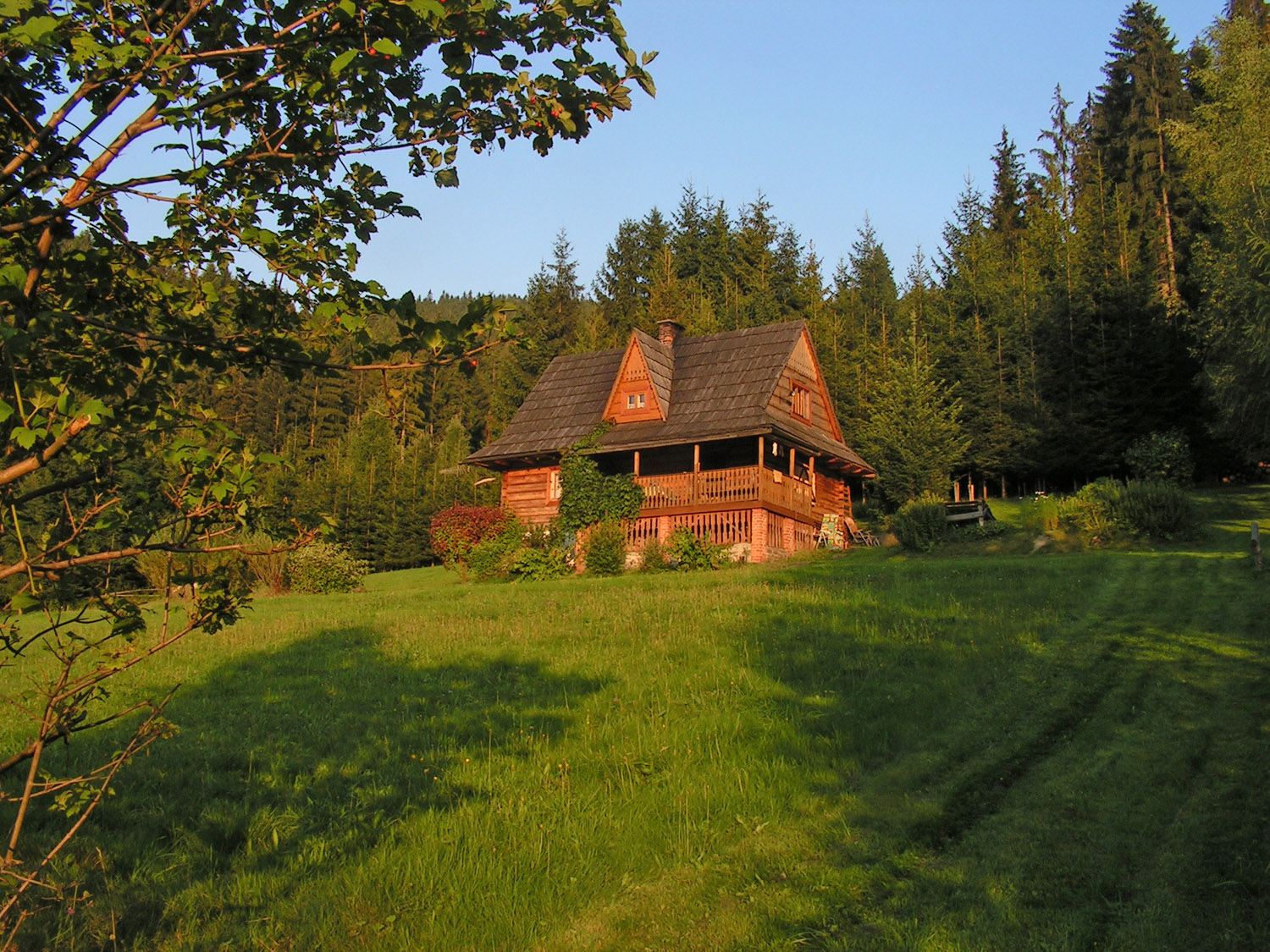
- Wooden house in Rycerka Górna

- Location within Poland
- Coordinates: 49°28′N 19°2′E
- Country: Poland
- Voivodeship: Silesian
- County: Żywiec
- Gmina: Rajcza
- Highest elevation: 650 m (2,130 ft)
- Lowest elevation: 600 m (2,000 ft)
- Population: 1,500

Rycerka Górna [rɨˈt͡sɛrka ˈɡurna] is a village in the administrative district of Gmina Rajcza, within Żywiec County, Silesian Voivodeship, in southern Poland, close to the border with Slovakia.
