= Kamienica, Bielsko-Biała =

Kamienica
- Osiedle of Bielsko-Biała
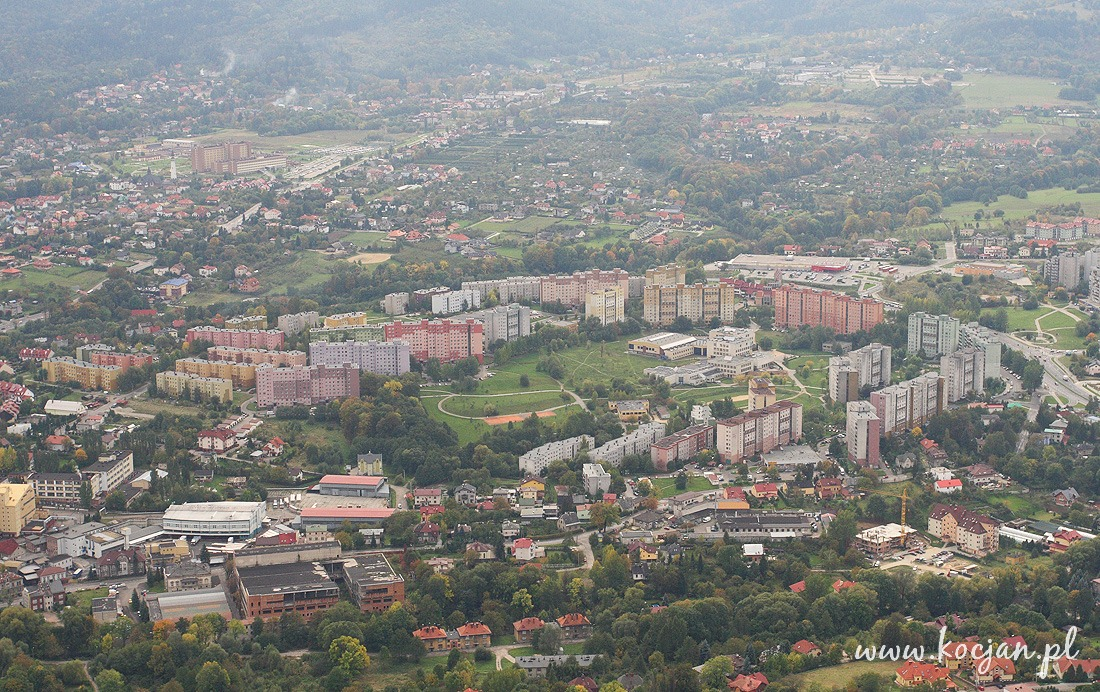
- Aerial view of Kamienica

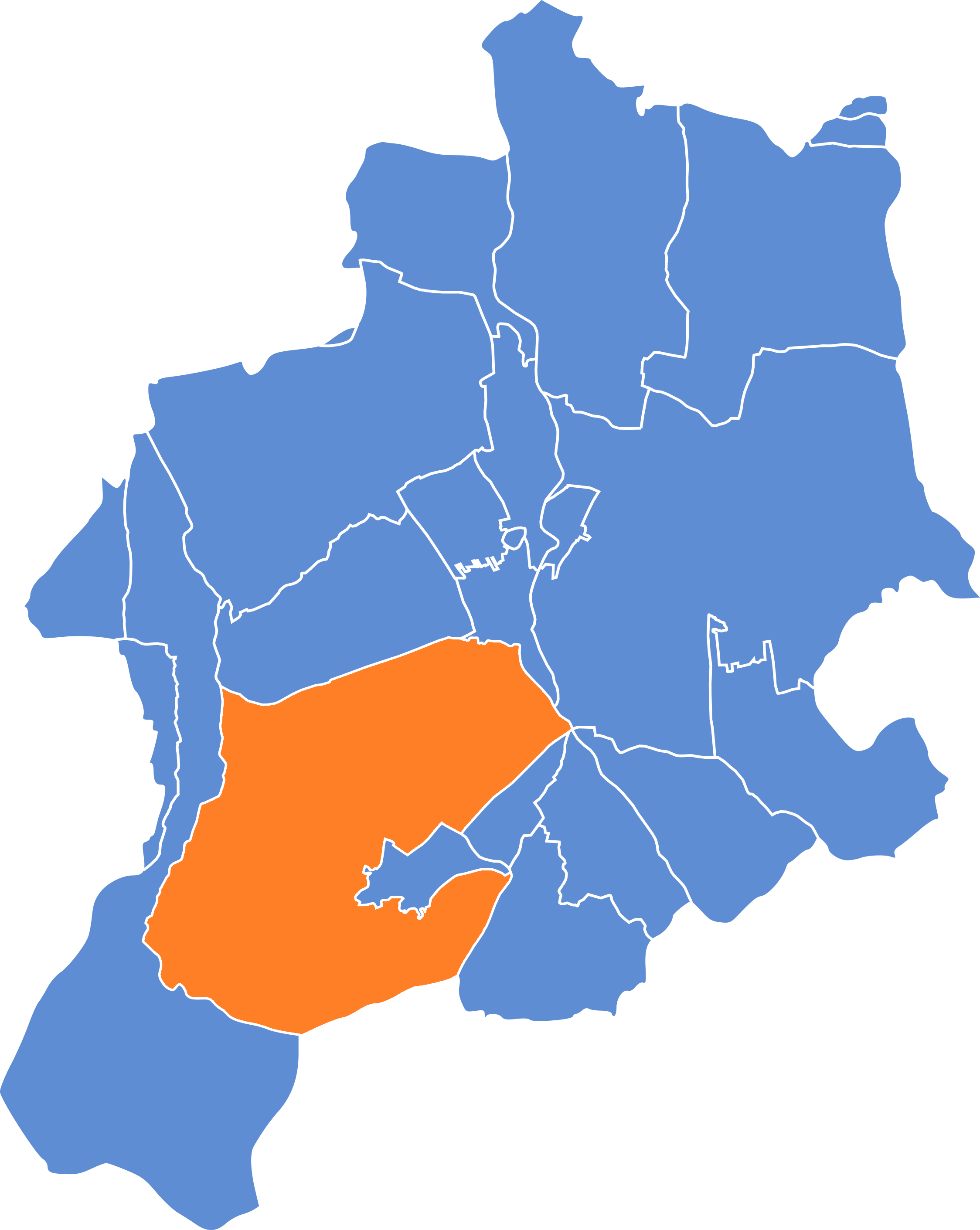
- Location of Kamienica within Bielsko-Biała
- Coordinates: 49°48′3″N 19°1′7″E
- Country: Poland
- Voivodeship: Silesian
- County/City: Bielsko-Biała

Area
  - Total: 7.1005 km^{2} (2.7415 sq mi)

Population (2006)
  - Total: 4,910
  - Density: 692/km^{2} (1,790/sq mi)
- Time zone: UTC+1 (CET)
  - Summer (DST): UTC+2 (CEST)
- Area code: (+48) 033

Kamienica (German: Kamitz; Silesian: Miyszkanie) is an osiedle (district) of Bielsko-Biała, Silesian Voivodeship, southern Poland. Historically it was a separate village but was merged into the city in 1968. The osiedle has an area of 7.1005 km^{2} and on December 31, 2006 had 4,910 inhabitants.

The name is of topographic origin and is derived from stones (Polish adjective kamienny).

== History ==
The village was first mentioned in a Latin document of Diocese of Wrocław called Liber fundationis episcopatus Vratislaviensis from around 1305 as item in Kemnitz. It meant that the village was in the process of location (the size of land to pay a tithe from was not yet precised). The creation of the village was a part of a larger settlement campaign taking place in the late 13th century on the territory of what will be later known as Upper Silesia.

Politically the village belonged initially to the Duchy of Teschen, formed in 1290 in the process of feudal fragmentation of Poland and was ruled by a local branch of Piast dynasty. In 1327 the duchy became a fee of the Kingdom of Bohemia, which after 1526 became part of the Habsburg monarchy.

After the 1540s Protestant Reformation prevailed in the Duchy of Teschen and a local Catholic church built in 1547 was taken over by Lutherans in 1560. It was taken from them, as one from around fifty buildings in the region, by a special commission and given back to the Roman Catholic Church on 16 April 1654.

In 1572 it was sold together with the city of Bielsko and dozen of surrounding villages by dukes of Cieszyn and formed Bielsko state country. In the 19th century the eastern part of the village, adjacent to Bielsko, was industrialised.

After the Revolutions of 1848 in the Austrian Empire a modern municipal division was introduced in the re-established Austrian Silesia. The village as a municipality was subscribed to the political and legal district of Bielsko. According to the censuses conducted in 1880, 1890, 1900 and 1910 the population of the municipality grew from 1946 in 1880 to 3425 in 1910 with a majority being native German-speakers (at least 87.1% in 1900, at most 92.3% in 1910) accompanied by a Polish-speaking minority (at least 7.6% in 1910, at most 12.8% in 1900) and a few Czech-speaking persons (at most 4 in 1910), in terms of religion in 1910 majority were Roman Catholics (56.7%), followed by Protestants (41.5%) and Jews (61 or 1.8%). It was then considered to be a part of a German language island around Bielsko (German: Bielitz-Bialaer Sprachinsel).

After World War I, fall of Austria-Hungary, Polish–Czechoslovak War and the division of Cieszyn Silesia in 1920, it became a part of Poland. It was then annexed by Nazi Germany at the beginning of World War II. After the war it was restored to Poland.

Kamienica became administratively a part of Bielsko-Biała in 1968.
