= Seam =

Seam may refer to:

== Science and technology ==
- Seam (geology), a stratum of coal or mineral that is economically viable; a bed or a distinct layer or vein of rock in other layers of rock
- Seam (metallurgy), a metalworking process that joins the ends of two sheet metal edges
- Seam (sewing), the line where two or more layers of fabric are held together by stitches.
- Seam (unit), various obsolete units of measurement
- Can seamer, a machine used to seal a lid to a can body, such as in paint or food cans
- JBoss Seam, a Java application framework by JBoss
- Seam carving, an image resizing algorithm
- Sun Enterprise Authentication Mechanism, or SEAM, an implementation of Kerberos protocol for the Solaris operating system

== Sports ==
- Quarter seam, a thread on the surface of a cricket ball
- Seam bowling, in cricket, refers to bowling with the main seam upright
- Seam route, a passing route in football

== Other uses ==
- Seam (band), an indie rock band from Chicago, Illinois
- SEAM, the ICAO airport code for Chachoan Airport in Ambato, Ecuador
- Seam, a character from the video game Deltarune

== See also ==
- Seamless (disambiguation)
- Seem (disambiguation)
- Seim (disambiguation)
