= Rycerka Dolna =

- Village
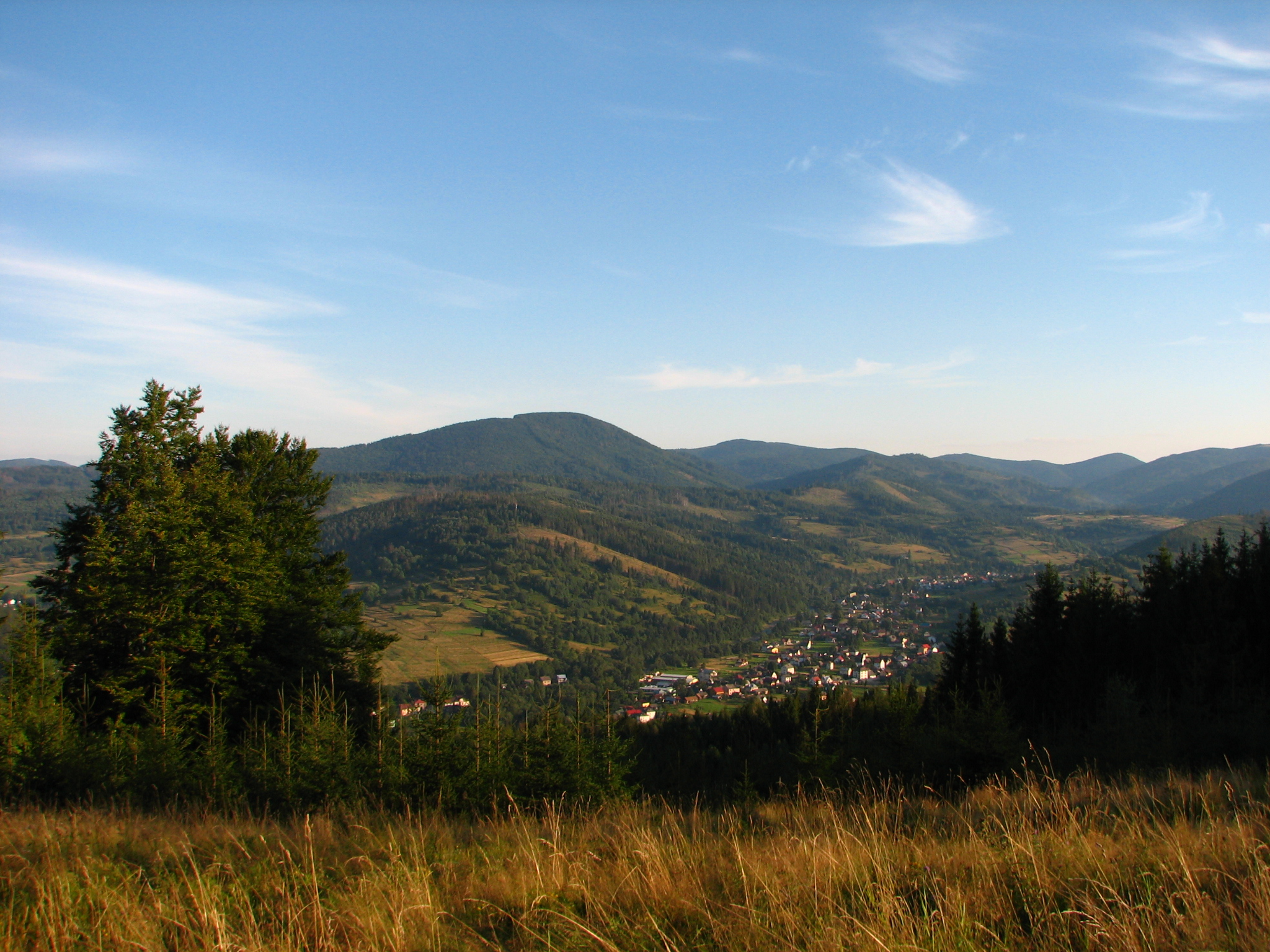
- Rycerka Dolna

- Location within Poland
- Coordinates: 49°29′N 19°6′E
- Country: Poland
- Voivodeship: Silesian
- County: Żywiec
- Gmina: Rajcza
- Elevation: 550 m (1,800 ft)
- Population: 1,425

Rycerka Dolna [rɨˈt͡sɛrka ˈdɔlna] is a village in the administrative district of Gmina Rajcza, within Żywiec County, Silesian Voivodeship, in southern Poland, close to the border with Slovakia.
