= Rajcza =

- Village
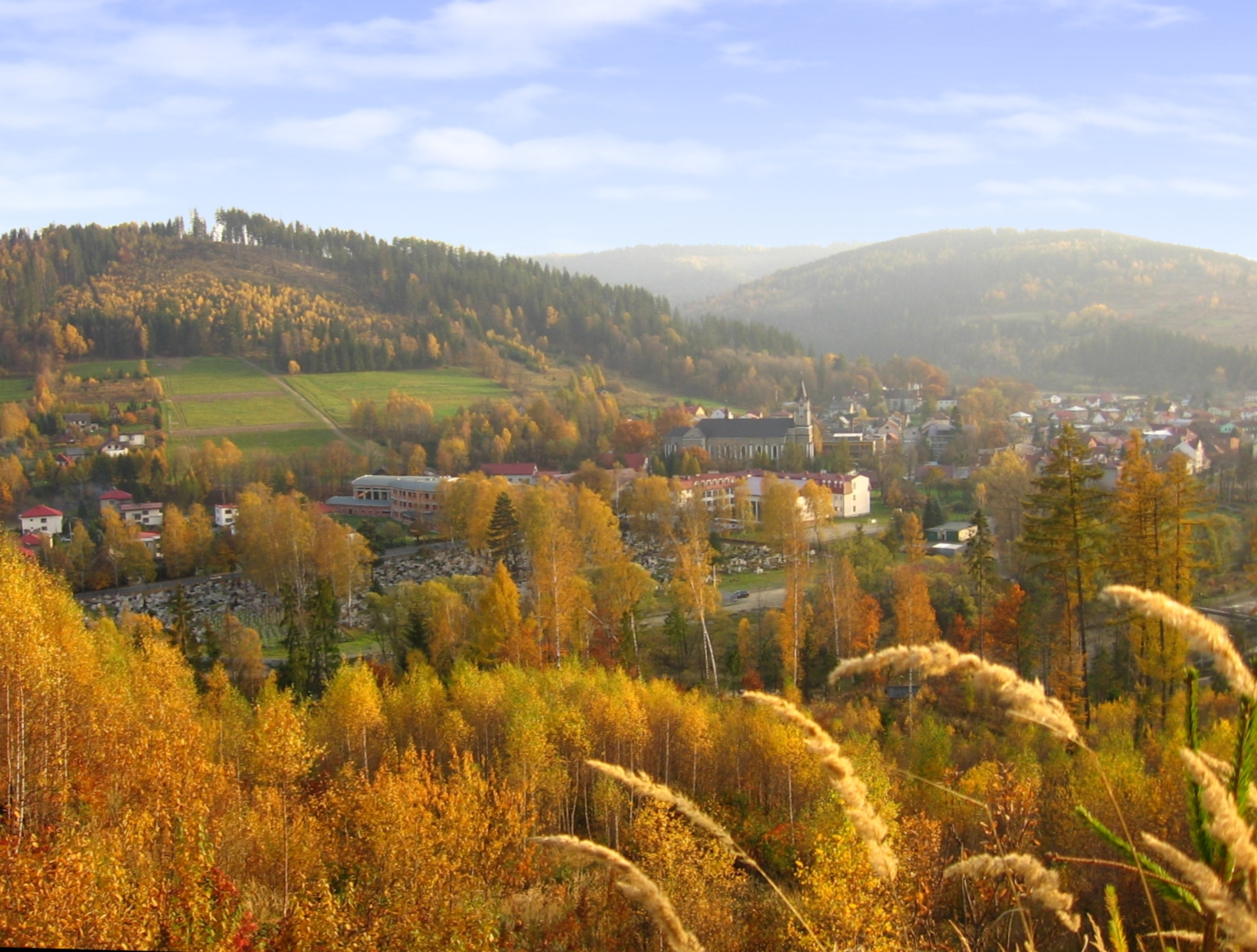
- View of Rajcza

- Location within Poland
- Coordinates: 49°30′25″N 19°6′27″E
- Country: Poland
- Voivodeship: Silesian
- County: Żywiec
- Gmina: Rajcza
- Population: 3,438

Rajcza [ˈrai̯t͡ʂa] is a village in Żywiec County, Silesian Voivodeship, in the historic province of Lesser Poland, close to the border with Slovakia. It is the seat of the gmina (administrative district) called Gmina Rajcza.

== Location and transport ==
Rajcza lies in the Żywiec Beskids, on the Soła river, near Żywiec Landscape Park. The village has a rail station, on the line from Żywiec to the Polish-Slovakian border. It is a popular tourist destination, with guest houses and winter sports facilities.

== History ==
The village of Rajcza was founded in the first half of the 17th century, when this area belonged to Kraków Voivodeship, of the Polish - Lithuanian Commonwealth. At that time Rajcza belonged to Queen Constance of Austria, the wife of King Sigismund III Vasa, part of her folwark with main center located at Węgierska Górka. Following the Partitions of Poland Rajcza, together with southwestern Lesser Poland, became annexed by the Austrian Empire (1772). In 1843, iron manufacture was opened here, and 1854–1894, the owner of the village, Teodor Primavesi, remodeled a local palace, establishing a park around it. In 1884 Rajcza got rail connection with Żywiec and Cadca, and 10 years later, the village was purchased by the Lubomirski family, who expanded the palace. In 1914, Rajcza was bought by Żywiec branch of the Habsburgs. In 1880 the village had 2,037 inhabitants, with 140 Jews, and 25 Germans.

In the Second Polish Republic Rajcza became a popular tourist destination. At that time, it had a Jewish minority, which in 1921 was estimated at 132. During World War II, Rajcza, together with whole Żywiec County, was directly incorporated into the Third Reich. Local Jews were transported to a ghetto in Sucha Beskidzka, and then murdered in death camps. In October 1940, during Action Saybusch, 115 Polish families (501 persons) were forced to abandon their houses. The Poles were replaced with ethnic Germans from Bucovina. In May 1945, Rajcza was captured by the Red Army. Until 1975, the village remained in Kraków Voivodeship. In 1975 - 1999, it belonged to Bielsko-Biała Voivodeship.

== Points of interest ==
- Parish church of St. Lawrence (1890),
- Palace of Karol Stefan Habsburg, which in World War I was a military hospital,
- Palace park,
- Kornhauser family house (19th century).
