= Zwardoń =

- Village
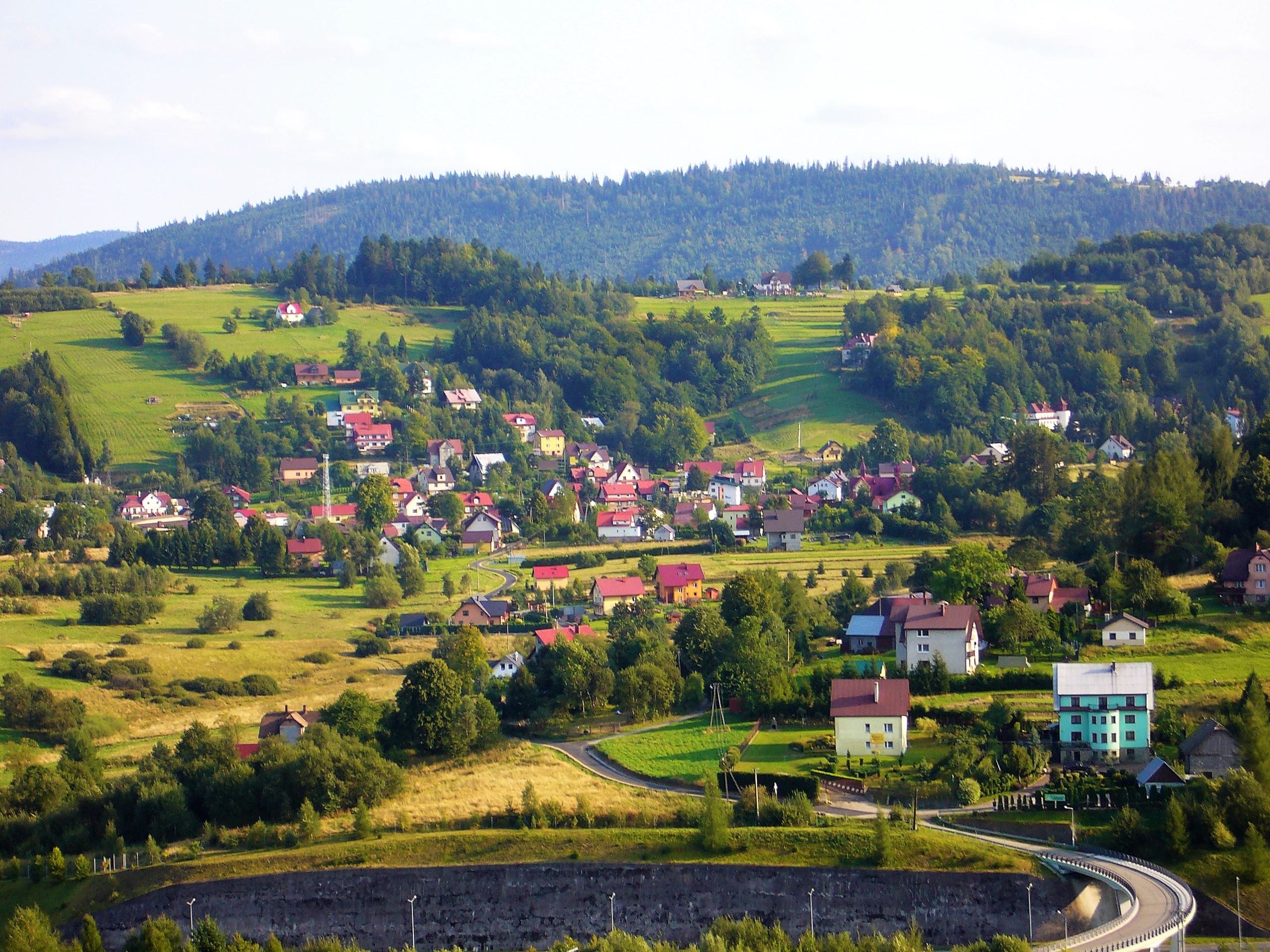
- General view

- Location within Poland
- Coordinates: 49°31′N 18°59′E
- Country: Poland
- Voivodeship: Silesian
- County: Żywiec
- Gmina: Rajcza
- Elevation: 690 m (2,260 ft)
- Population: 1,000

Zwardoń [ˈzvardɔɲ] is a village in the administrative district of Gmina Rajcza, within Żywiec County, Silesian Voivodeship, in the Żywiec Beskids mountain range in southern Poland, on the border with Slovakia. The village is mostly known for mountain tourism and as a border crossing point. In 1884, a railway line to Čadca was opened. Although Zwardoń belongs nowadays to the Silesian Voivodeship, historically it lays in Lesser Poland.

== Location and transport ==
Zwardoń, located at the elevation of 690 meters above sea level, is placed between three mountain passes - Przysłop, Zwardońska and Graniczne. Until 1975, the village was administratively tied with Kraków and Lesser Poland. In 1975 - 1999, it belonged to Bielsko-Biala Voivodeship, and after the territorial reform of Poland in 1999, it became part of the Silesian Voivodeship, even though historically it does not belong to Silesia. Zwardoń has a rail station along the historic Galician Transversal Railway, which connects Żywiec and other Polish cities with Slovak town of Žilina, and further on, Vienna. Since the construction of the line, Zwardoń has been a border station, and the crossing was closed down in 2007, due to Schengen Agreement. The village is also located on the Expressway S69, which goes from Bielsko-Biała to Slovakia.

== History ==
Zwardoń is a relatively young village. It is not known exactly when it was established, most probably some time in the 17th century. Its oldest district is the settlement called Myto, which was probably established by shepherds, who came to this area from the overcrowded villages around Węgierska Górka. The name Zwardoń appears on the maps for the first time in the late 18th century. The village belonged to Lesser Poland, in its extreme southwest corner, near the border with the Kingdom of Hungary. In the late 18th century, after the Partitions of Poland, and the creation of Galicia, Emperor Joseph II ordered the construction of a road along the Przysłop mountain pass. Zwardoń belonged to Żywiec County, and it remained a small village until 1884, when the rail line was opened from Żywiec to Cadca. By 1889, the population grew to 124, in 1891 a post office was opened here, and in 1901, an elementary school.

In the 1930s Zwardoń, which belonged to Kraków Voivodeship, became a popular skiing location. Enjoying good climate, snowy winters, treeless slopes and good rail connections, the village prospered. New houses were built, in winter, special trains from Warsaw would bring tourists and skiers. In 1930, a ski jumping hill was opened. During World War II Zwardoń was directly annexed by the Third Reich. Its 356 Polish residents were expelled, and replaced by the Germans. After the war, Zwardoń remained a popular tourist center, due to well-developed skiing infrastructure, guest houses and several trails.
