= Eugen Seim =

Police Major Eugen Seim (4 July 1896 in Stuttgart – 7 March 1943 in Kiev) (Note: Major Eugen Seim from the Polizei-Battalion No. 83 buried in Kiev, is not to be mistaken with another Eugen Seim from the Wehrmacht killed on the Eastern Front but a year later, on March 21, 1944; he was born in Allendorf (not in Stuttgart) on September 22, 1916.) was a Nazi German officer during World War II, in charge of the Polizei-Battalion No. 83 of the German Schutzpolizei (or Schupo) involved in mass expulsions of some 18,000–20,000 ethnic Poles from the territory of Żywiec County in Silesia at the beginning of Nazi–Soviet occupation of Poland. Seim was born in Stuttgart and died on the Eastern Front in the Soviet Union at the age of 47. He is buried at the military cemetery in Kiev.
