= Sól, Silesian Voivodeship =

Sól
- Village
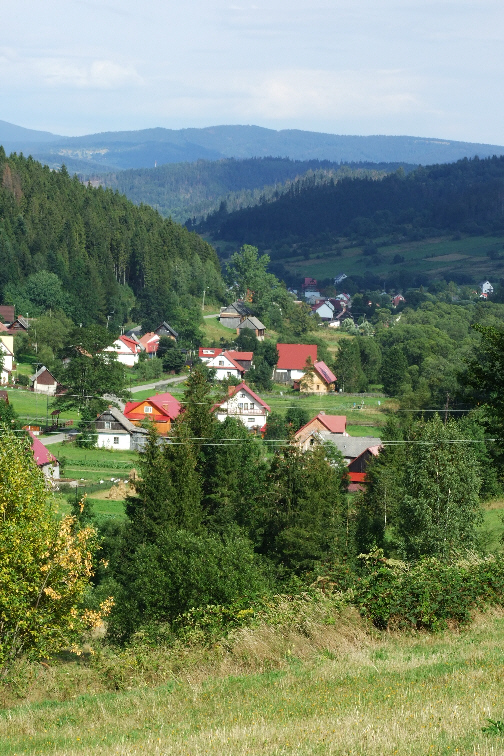

- Location within Poland
- Coordinates: 49°29′20″N 19°2′38″E
- Country: Poland
- Voivodeship: Silesian
- County: Żywiec
- Gmina: Rajcza
- Population: 1,573
- Website: http://www.rajcza.com.pl/s.php?sol

Sól [sul] (literally salt) is a village in the administrative district of Gmina Rajcza, within Żywiec County, Silesian Voivodeship, in southern Poland, close to the border with Slovakia.
