= Rzyki =

- Village
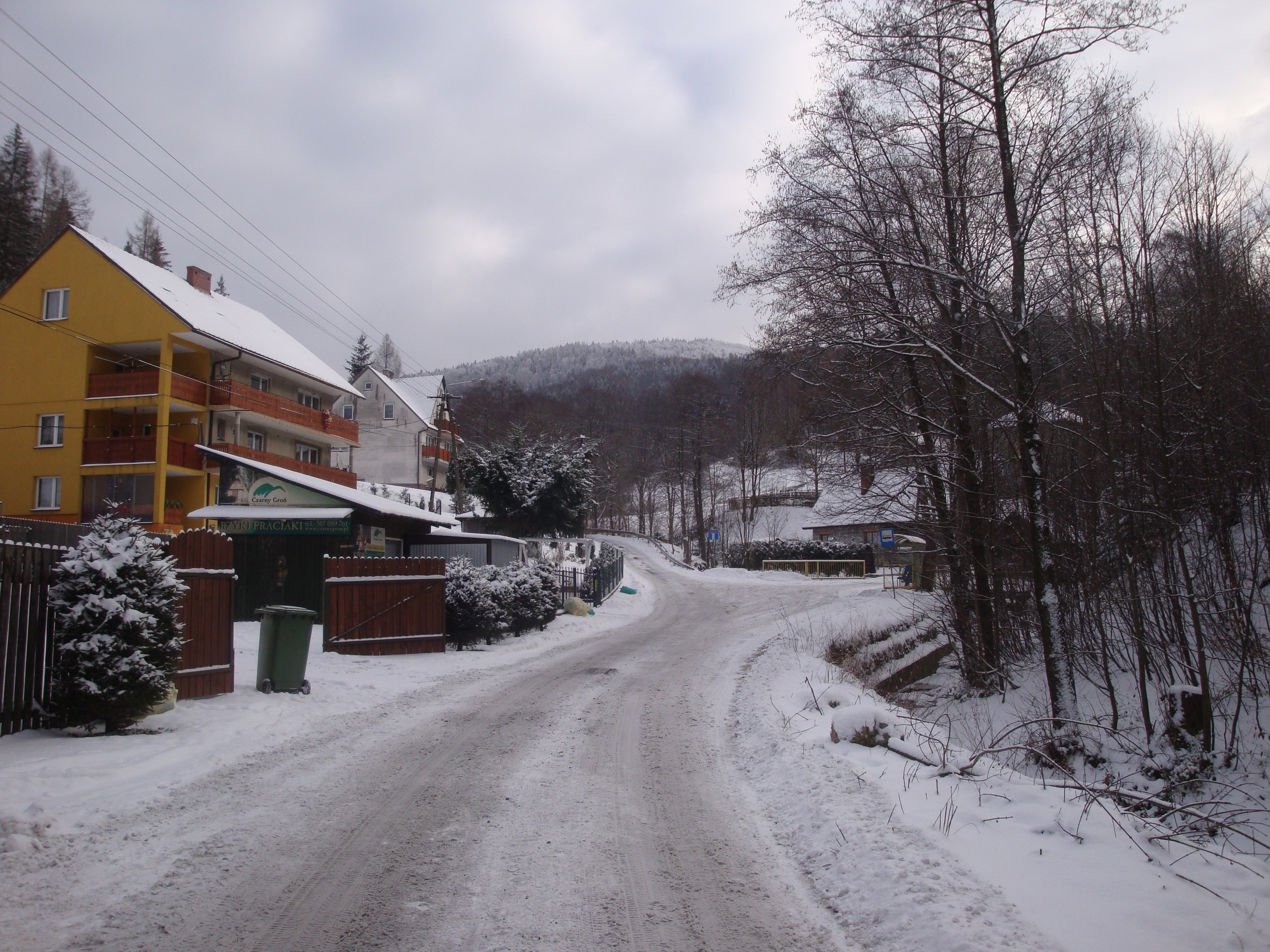
- Osiedle Mydlarze in Rzyki

- Location within Poland
- Coordinates: 49°49′N 19°23′E
- Country: Poland
- Voivodeship: Lesser Poland
- County: Wadowice
- Gmina: Andrychów
- Population: 3,052
- Website: http://www.rzyki.pl

Rzyki [ˈʐɨkʲi] is a village in the administrative district of Gmina Andrychów, within Wadowice County, Lesser Poland Voivodeship, in southern Poland.

== Geography ==
The village is located in the western part of the Lesser Poland Voivodeship, close to the border with the Silesian Voivodeship. It is situated in the historical Lesser Poland region, in the Little Beskids mountain range, in the valley of Rzyczanka, and is ethnically part of the Goral Lands. It sits in close proximity to the mountains of Gancarz, Leskowiec, and Groń Jana Pawła II. Its neighbouring villages are Sułkowice, Zagórnik, Targanice, Ponikiew, Kaczyna, Targoszów, and Ślemień. The sołectwo of Rzyki has an area of 2,683 hectares (6,630 acres).

=== Integral parts ===
According to the National Register of Geographical Names for 2024, the village of Rzyki had 42 integral parts, divided into:

- 13 hamlets (przysiółek wsi): Czarny Groń, Dziura, Hatale, Hatalówka, Młockówka, Podlachoń, Potoczówka, Potok, Potrójna, Praciaki, Pracica, Równice, Sordylówka
- 29 parts of the village (część wsi): Biczaki, Burowie, Butory, Frysie, Haczki, Jagódki, Kiszczaki, Kopry, Krzysie, Kubiki, Mikołajki, Młocki Dolne, Młocki Górne, Młynarczyki, Moskwiki, Mydlarze, Sabudy, Służyny, Sobale, Sordyle, Styły, Szafarze, Szczęśniaki, Ścibory, Tomiczki, Urbanki, Wantoły, Wawrzyny, Za Kościołem

== Etymology ==
The name Rzyki originated from the fact that there are multiple streams flowing through the area (rzeki is Polish for rivers). The village's first name was Nowa Wieś (New Village), as noted in a 16th century document. In the following centuries, the village's name was written as Rzeczki (noted in 1581) and Rzeki (1765). The change of e into y occurred due to the influence of the Lesser Poland dialect, which is used in the area.

== History ==
The village of Rzyki was founded in the years 1558–1560 under the Vlach law by Stanisław Tluczich, in the Duchy of Oświęcim. In 1563 and the following years, Tluczich, who was the first sołtys of the village, built a watermill, an inn, and a sawmill. In 1564, the Duchies of Oświęcim and Zator, along with the village of Rzyki, were recognized as part of the Polish Crown under the reign of King Sigismund Augustus. The village was incorporated into the Silesian County of the Kraków Voivodeship.

In 1624, a group of bandits from Świnna attacked Rzyki, burning down the village and murdering at least 6 of its inhabitants. According to tax-related documents from the years 1662–1667, there were 182 people living in 26 houses in Rzyki. In 1689, there were 34 houses in the village.

The sawmill built by Tluczich was destroyed during a flood in the 1720s. Following the first partition of Poland in 1772, Rzyki was annexed by the Habsburg Empire, and remained in Austrian Galicia until 1918. In the 1780s, the people of Rzyki started trading woven products. Some were selling their products internationally, to Russia, Turkey, and the Netherlands. A glass factory was founded in the village. The Saint James the Greater church in Rzyki was built in 1796.

A local typhus epidemic in the 1840s killed 759 people in the village. In the 1880s and 1890s, the inhabitants of Rzyki started emigrating to the United States, mostly to Detroit. The local school was opened in 1898. The voluntary fire service of Rzyki was formed in 1902.

In Autumn 1918, about 30 inhabitants of Rzyki died due to the Spanish flu. Around this time, the village had a population of 2,488. With the end of the First World War, Rzyki became part of the independent Republic of Poland. Construction of a new school building was finished in 1919. A hospital was opened in Rzyki for a few weeks in 1920 to fight against the ongoing typhus epidemic, which killed 41 people. The village was occupied by Nazi Germany following the Invasion of Poland in 1939, which marked the beginning of World War II. The people of Nidek and Wieprz were relocated to Rzyki. Many inhabitants of the village were either taken into forced labour in Nazi Germany or imprisoned in concentration camps. The Nazi occupation ended in January 1945, when the Red Army captured the region.

The village got electric power in 1957. The new school building was opened in 1983.

== Sports ==
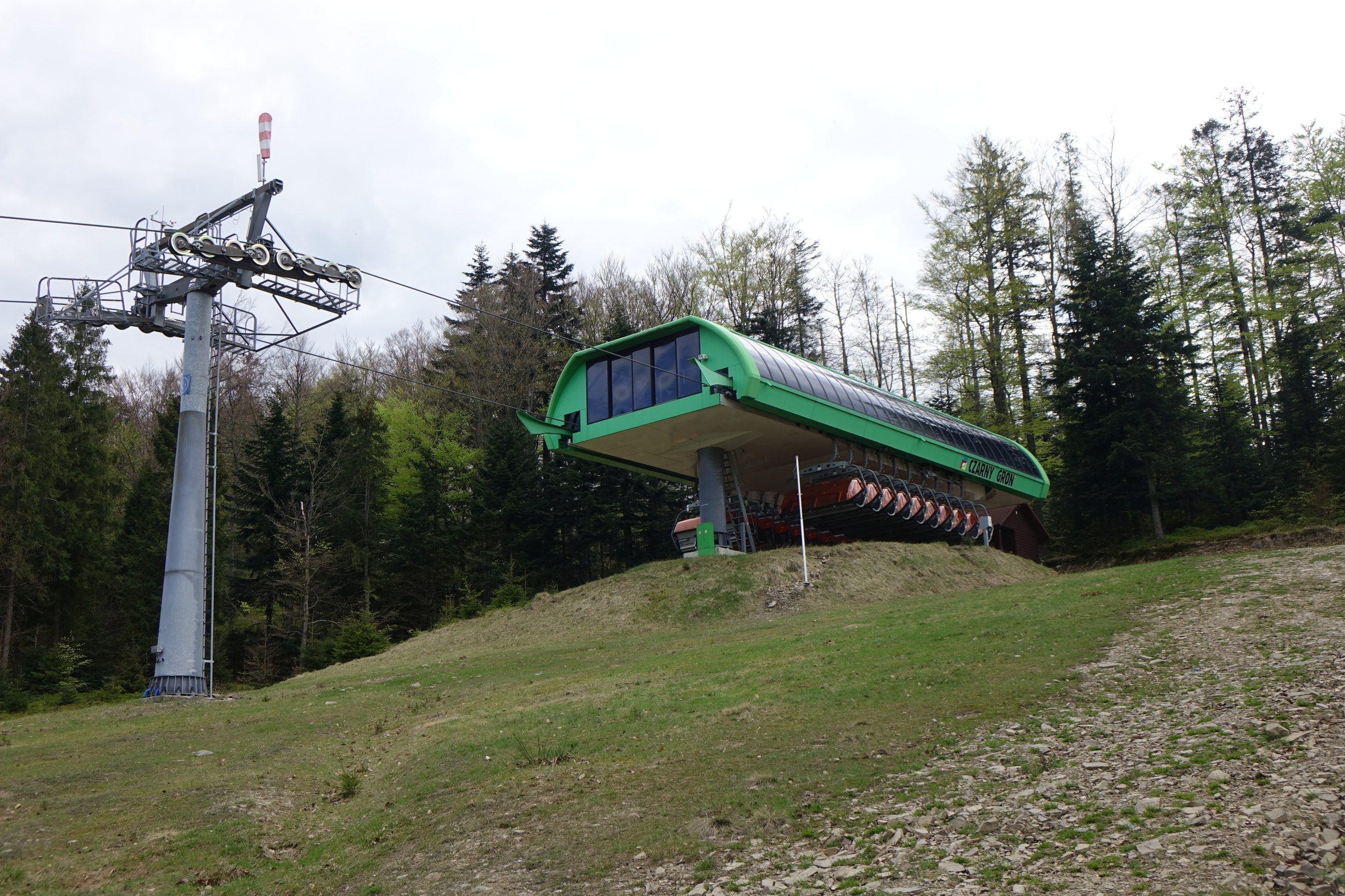
Ski resort

The village is a winter sports centre. A ski resort, named "Czarny Groń", has been opened in Rzyki. There's also an ice skating rink.

The local football club is LKS Leskowiec Rzyki, founded in 1957. It competes in the lower leagues.

== Religion ==
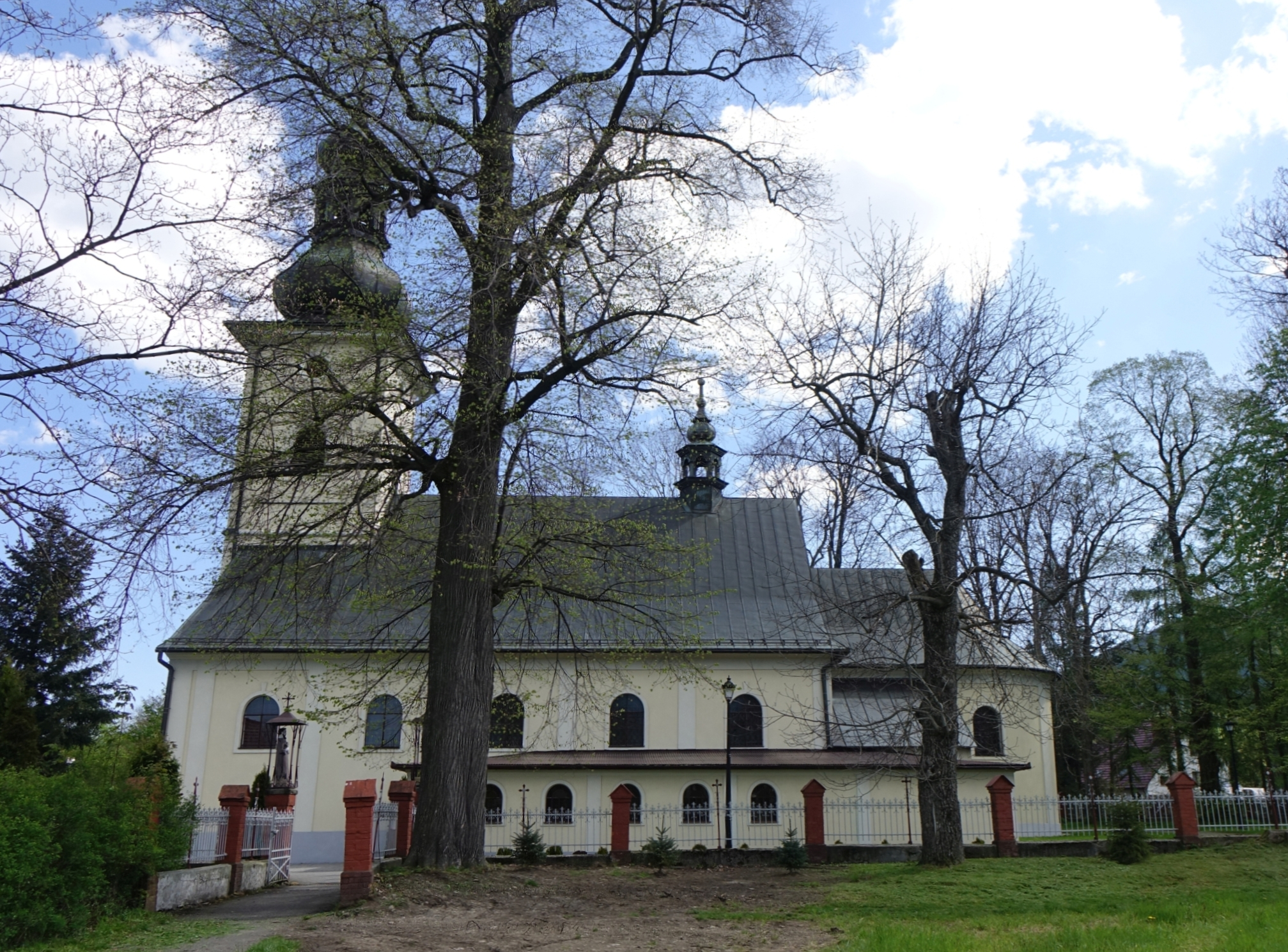
Saint James the Greater church

The Roman Catholic Saint James the Greater church, raised in 1796 in the so-called "Joseph’s style" and consecrated in 1808, is located in the centre of the village, on a small hill. The church is a seat of the local parish, which belongs to the Roman Catholic Diocese of Bielsko–Żywiec. The church is under cultural property protection.

== Gallery ==
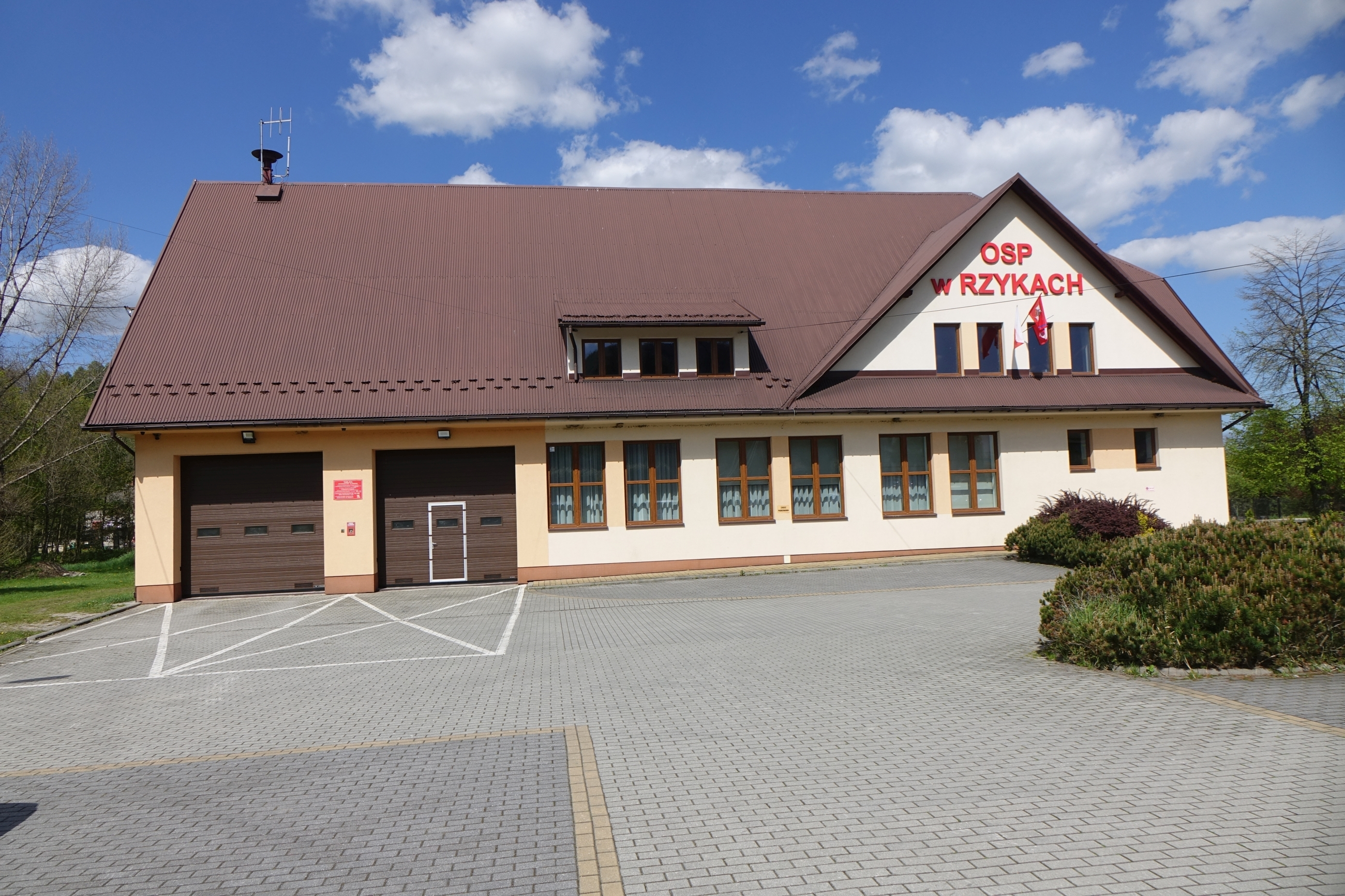
Fire station

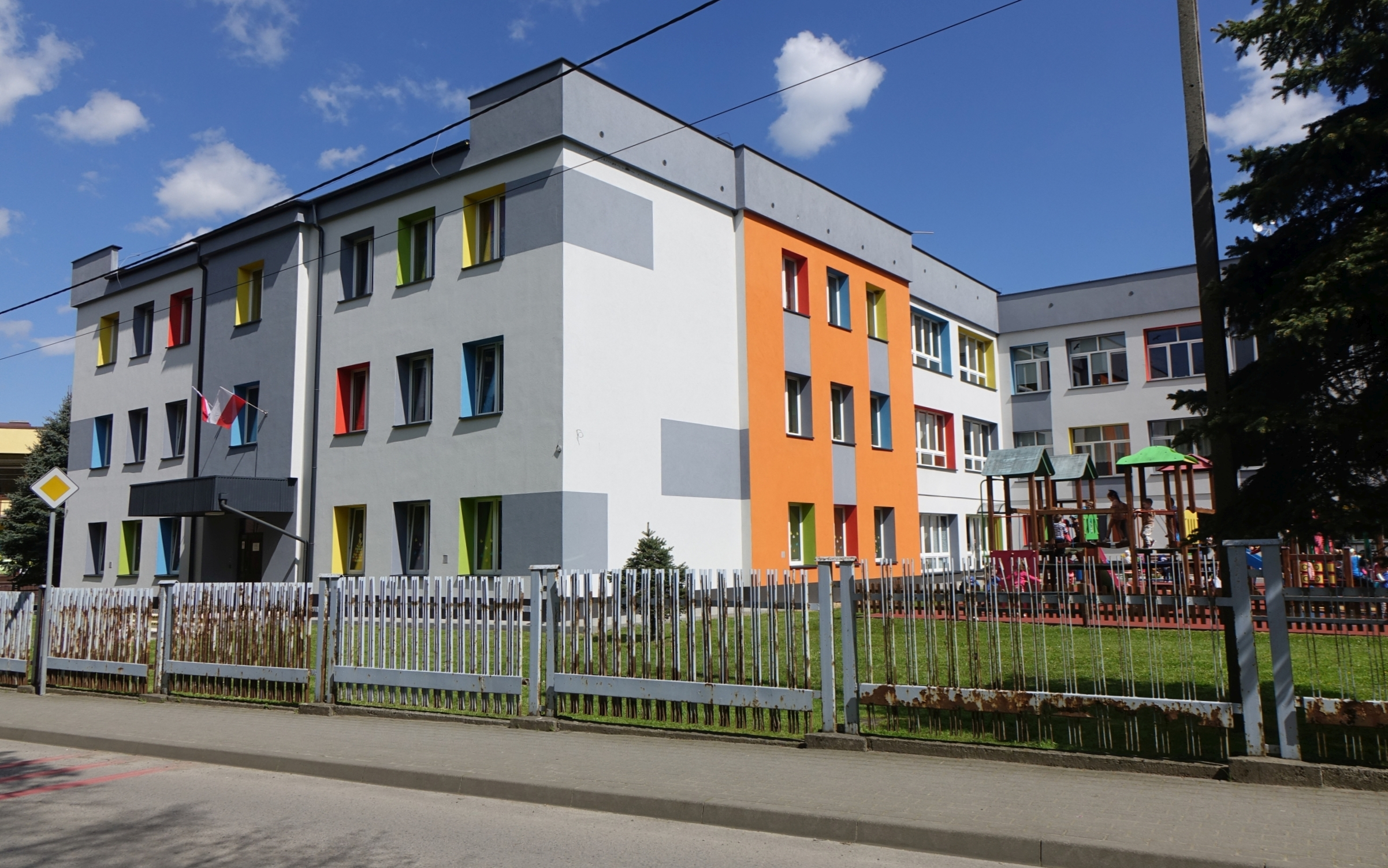
Elementary school
