= December 19 =

Day of the year

December 19 this year in various calendars
- Saturday, 19 December 2026
Other calendars
Armenian	2 Arach 1476
Aztec	Tozoztontli 18, 6 Ozomahtli
Babylonian	9 Kislimu, 2337 SE
Balinese pawukon	Luang, Pepet, Pasah, Sri, Keliwon, Tungleh, Saniscara of Wariga, Sri, Dangu, Raja
Bengali	4 Poush, BS 1433
Chinese	Yin Fire Rabbit・Girl Mansion; 11 Shíyīyuè, Bǐngwǔnián (Daxue, 3 days until Dongzhi)
Common Era	19 December 2026 CE
Coptic	10 Koiak, AM 1743
Egyptian	7 Pachon, 2775 NE
Ethiopian	10 Tākḫśāś, 2019 Amätä Məhrät
French Republican	Décade III, Octidi de Frimaire de l'Année 235 de la République
Gregorian	19 December, AD 2026
Hebrew	9 Tevet, AM 5787
Icelandic	Laugardagur, 27 Ýlir 2026
Islamic	9 Rajab, AH 1448 (using tabular method)
ISO week date	2026-W51-6
Japanese	11 Shimotsuki, Reiwa 8 (Taisetsu, 3 days until Tōji)
Julian	6 December, AD 2026 (AM 7535)
Julian day	2461394
Maya	13.0.14.3.11; 4 Kankin, 6 Chuen
Roman	ante diem VIII Idus Decembres, MMDCCLXXIX AUC
Solar Hijri	28 Azar, SH 1405

<<	December					>>
Su	Mo	Tu	We	Th	Fr	Sa
		1	2	3	4	5
6	7	8	9	10	11	12
13	14	15	16	17	18	19
20	21	22	23	24	25	26
27	28	29	30	31
2026

December 19 in recent years
2025 (Friday)
2024 (Thursday)
2023 (Tuesday)
2022 (Monday)
2021 (Sunday)
2020 (Saturday)
2019 (Thursday)
2018 (Wednesday)
2017 (Tuesday)
2016 (Monday)

December 19 is the 353rd day of the year (354th in leap years) in the Gregorian calendar; 12 days remain until the end of the year.

== Events ==
=== Pre-1600 ===
- 653 – Pope Martin I, having been abducted by Byzantine authorities from Rome for his opposition to Monothelitism, is tried in Constantinople.
- 1154 – Henry II of England is crowned at Westminster Abbey.
- 1187 – Pope Clement III is elected.
- 1490 – Anne, Duchess of Brittany, is married to Maximilian I, Holy Roman Emperor by proxy.
- 1562 – The Battle of Dreux takes place during the French Wars of Religion.

=== 1601–1900 ===
- 1606 – The ships Susan Constant, Godspeed, and Discovery depart England carrying settlers who founded, at Jamestown, Virginia, the first of the thirteen colonies that became the United States.
- 1675 – The Great Swamp Fight, a pivotal battle in King Philip's War, gives the English settlers a bitterly won victory.
- 1688 – Glorious Revolution: Williamite forces defeat Jacobites at Battle of Reading, forcing James II to flee England.
- 1776 – Thomas Paine publishes one of a series of pamphlets in The Pennsylvania Journal entitled "The American Crisis".
- 1777 – American Revolutionary War: George Washington's Continental Army goes into winter quarters at Valley Forge, Pennsylvania.
- 1783 – William Pitt the Younger becomes the youngest Prime Minister of the United Kingdom at 24.
- 1793 – War of the First Coalition: The Siege of Toulon ends when Napoleon's French artillery forces the British to abandon the city, securing southern France from invasion.
- 1796 – French Revolutionary Wars: Two British frigates under Commodore Horatio Nelson and two Spanish frigates under Commodore Don Jacobo Stuart engage in battle off the coast of Murcia.
- 1828 – Vice President of the United States John C. Calhoun sparks the Nullification Crisis when he anonymously publishes the South Carolina Exposition and Protest, protesting the Tariff of 1828.
- 1900 – Hopetoun Blunder: The first Governor-General of Australia John Hope, 7th Earl of Hopetoun, appoints Sir William Lyne premier of the new state of New South Wales, but he is unable to persuade other colonial politicians to join his government and is forced to resign.
- 1900 – French parliament votes amnesty for all involved in scandalous army treason trial known as Dreyfus affair.

=== 1901–present ===
- 1907 – Two hundred thirty-nine coal miners die in the Darr Mine Disaster in Jacobs Creek, Pennsylvania.
- 1912 – William Van Schaick, captain of the steamship General Slocum which caught fire and killed over one thousand people, is pardoned by U.S. President William Howard Taft after 3 1/2 years in Sing Sing prison.
- 1920 – King Constantine I is restored as King of the Hellenes after the death of his son Alexander of Greece and a plebiscite.
- 1924 – The last Rolls-Royce Silver Ghost is sold in London, England.
- 1924 – German serial killer Fritz Haarmann is sentenced to death for a series of murders.
- 1927 – Three Indian revolutionaries, Ram Prasad Bismil, Roshan Singh and Ashfaqulla Khan, are executed by the British Raj for participation in the Kakori conspiracy.
- 1929 – The Indian National Congress promulgates the Purna Swaraj (the Declaration of the Independence of India).
- 1932 – BBC World Service begins broadcasting as the BBC Empire Service.
- 1940 – Risto Ryti, the Prime Minister of Finland, is elected President of the Republic of Finland in a presidential election, which is exceptionally held by the 1937 electoral college.
- 1941 – World War II: Adolf Hitler appoints himself as head of the Oberkommando des Heeres.
- 1941 – World War II: Limpet mines placed by Italian divers heavily damage HMS Valiant and HMS Queen Elizabeth in Alexandria harbour.
- 1945 – John Amery, British Fascist, is executed at the age of 33 by the British Government for treason.
- 1946 – Start of the First Indochina War.
- 1956 – Irish-born physician John Bodkin Adams is arrested in connection with the suspicious deaths of more than 160 patients. Eventually he is convicted only of minor charges.
- 1961 – India annexes Daman and Diu, part of Portuguese India.
- 1967 – Harold Holt, the Prime Minister of Australia, is officially presumed dead.
- 1972 – Apollo program: The last crewed lunar flight, Apollo 17, carrying Eugene Cernan, Ronald Evans, and Harrison Schmitt, returns to Earth.
- 1974 – Nelson Rockefeller is sworn in as Vice President of the United States under President Gerald Ford under the provisions of the Twenty-fifth Amendment to the United States Constitution.
- 1977 – The M_{s} 5.8 Bob–Tangol earthquake strikes Kerman Province in Iran, destroying villages and killing 665 people.
- 1981 – Sixteen lives are lost when the Penlee lifeboat goes to the aid of the stricken coaster Union Star in heavy seas.
- 1983 – The original FIFA World Cup trophy, the Jules Rimet Trophy, is stolen from the headquarters of the Brazilian Football Confederation in Rio de Janeiro, Brazil.
- 1984 – The Sino-British Joint Declaration, stating that China would resume the exercise of sovereignty over Hong Kong and the United Kingdom would restore Hong Kong to China with effect from July 1, 1997, is signed in Beijing by Deng Xiaoping and Margaret Thatcher.
- 1985 – Aeroflot Flight 101/435 is hijacked to China by its first officer.
- 1986 – Mikhail Gorbachev, leader of the Soviet Union, releases Andrei Sakharov and his wife from exile in Gorky.
- 1995 – The United States Government restores federal recognition to the Nottawaseppi Huron Band of Potawatomi Native American tribe.
- 1997 – SilkAir Flight 185 crashes into the Musi River, near Palembang in Indonesia, killing 104.
- 1998 – President Bill Clinton is impeached by the United States House of Representatives, becoming the second president of the United States to be impeached.
- 1999 – Space Shuttle Discovery is launched on STS-103, the third Hubble Space Telescope servicing mission.
- 2001 – Argentine economic crisis: December riots: Riots erupt in Buenos Aires, Argentina.
- 2005 – Chalk's Ocean Airways Flight 101 crashes into the Government Cut channel immediately after takeoff from Miami Seaplane Base, killing 20.
- 2005 – A passenger train from Sucha Beskidzka to Żywiec in Poland loses its brakes while on a steep downhill part of the route. It is stopped in a controlled collision in Świnna by a train travelling in opposite direction. 2 drivers and 6 passengers are injured.
- 2012 – Park Geun-hye is elected the first female president of South Korea.
- 2013 – Spacecraft Gaia is launched by the European Space Agency.
- 2016 – Russian ambassador to Turkey Andrei Karlov is assassinated while at an art exhibition in Ankara. The assassin, Mevlüt Mert Altıntaş, is shot and killed by a Turkish guard.
- 2016 – A vehicular attack in Berlin, Germany, kills 12 and injures 56 people at a Christmas market.

== Births ==
=== Pre-1600 ===
- 1343 – William I, Margrave of Meissen (died 1407)
- 1498 – Andreas Osiander, German Protestant theologian (died 1552)
- 1554 – Philip William, Prince of Orange (died 1618)
- 1587 – Dorothea Sophia, Abbess of Quedlinburg (died 1645)

=== 1601–1900 ===
- 1683 – Philip V of Spain (died 1746)
- 1699 – William Bowyer, English printer (died 1777)
- 1714 – John Winthrop, American astronomer and educator (died 1779)
- 1778 – Marie Thérèse of France (died 1851)
- 1796 – Manuel Bretón de los Herreros, Spanish poet, playwright, and critic (died 1873)
- 1797 – Antoine Louis Dugès, French obstetrician and naturalist (died 1838)
- 1817 – James J. Archer, American lawyer and general (died 1864)
- 1820 – Mary Livermore, American journalist and activist (died 1905)
- 1825 – George Frederick Bristow, American violinist and composer (died 1898)
- 1831 – Bernice Pauahi Bishop, American philanthropist (died 1884)
- 1849 – Henry Clay Frick, American businessman and financier (died 1919)
- 1852 – Albert Abraham Michelson, Prussian-American physicist, chemist, and academic, Nobel Prize laureate (died 1931)
- 1853 – Charles Fitzpatrick, Canadian lawyer and politician, 12th Lieutenant-Governor of Quebec (died 1942)
- 1861 – Italo Svevo, Italian author and playwright (died 1928)
- 1863 – Wallace Bryant, American archer (died 1953)
- 1865 – Minnie Maddern Fiske, American actress and playwright (died 1932)
- 1873 – Alphonse Kirchhoffer, French fencer (died 1913)
- 1875 – Mileva Marić, Serbian physicist (died 1948)
- 1875 – Carter G. Woodson, American historian and author, founded Black History Month (died 1950)
- 1875 – Grace Marie Bareis, American mathematician (died 1962)
- 1876 – Bernard Friedberg, Austrian-Israeli scholar and author (died 1961)
- 1884 – Antonín Zápotocký, Czech politician, President of the Czechoslovak Socialist Republic (died 1957)
- 1888 – Fritz Reiner, Hungarian-American conductor (died 1963)
- 1891 – Edward Bernard Raczyński, Polish politician and diplomat, 4th President-in-exile of Poland (died 1993)
- 1894 – Ford C. Frick, American journalist and businessman (died 1978)
- 1895 – Ingeborg Refling Hagen, Norwegian author and educator (died 1989)
- 1899 – Martin Luther King Sr., American pastor, missionary, and activist (died 1984)

=== 1901–present ===
- 1901 – Rudolf Hell, German engineer, invented the Hellschreiber (died 2002)
- 1901 – Oliver La Farge, American anthropologist and author (died 1963)
- 1901 – Fritz Mauruschat, German footballer and manager (died 1974)
- 1902 – Ralph Richardson, English actor (died 1983)
- 1903 – George Davis Snell, American geneticist and immunologist, Nobel Prize laureate (died 1996)
- 1905 – Irving Kahn, American businessman (died 2015)
- 1905 – Giovanni Lurani, Italian race car driver, engineer, and journalist (died 1995)
- 1906 – Leonid Brezhnev, Ukrainian-Russian marshal, engineer, and politician, 4th Head of State of the Soviet Union (died 1982)
- 1907 – Jimmy McLarnin, Irish-American boxer, actor, and golfer (died 2004)
- 1909 – W. A. Criswell, American pastor and author (died 2002)
- 1910 – Jean Genet, French novelist, playwright, and poet (died 1986)
- 1914 – Mel Shaw, American animator and screenwriter (died 2012)
- 1915 – Édith Piaf, French singer-songwriter and actress (died 1963)
- 1915 – Claudia Testoni, Italian hurdler, sprinter, and long jumper (died 1998)
- 1916 – Roy Ward Baker, English director and producer (died 2010)
- 1916 – Elisabeth Noelle-Neumann, German political scientist, journalist, and academic (died 2010)
- 1918 – Professor Longhair, American singer-songwriter and pianist (died 1980)
- 1918 – Lee Rich, American producer and production manager (died 2012)
- 1920 – Little Jimmy Dickens, American singer-songwriter and guitarist (died 2015)
- 1920 – David Susskind, American talk show host and producer (died 1987)
- 1922 – Eamonn Andrews, Irish radio and television host (died 1987)
- 1923 – Robert V. Bruce, American historian and author (died 2008)
- 1923 – Gordon Jackson, Scottish-English actor and singer (died 1990)
- 1924 – Carlo Chiti, Italian engineer (died 1994)
- 1924 – Doug Harvey, Canadian ice hockey player and coach (died 1989)
- 1924 – Gary Morton, American comedian and producer (died 1999)
- 1924 – Edmund Purdom, British-Italian actor (died 2009)
- 1924 – Michel Tournier, French journalist and author (died 2016)
- 1924 – Cicely Tyson, American actress (died 2021)
- 1925 – Tankred Dorst, German author and playwright (died 2017)
- 1925 – William Schutz, American psychologist and academic (died 2002)
- 1925 – Robert B. Sherman, American songwriter and screenwriter (died 2012)
- 1926 – Bobby Layne, American football player and coach (died 1986)
- 1926 – Fikret Otyam, Turkish painter and journalist (died 2015)
- 1927 – James Booth, English actor and screenwriter (died 2005)
- 1928 – Eve Bunting, Irish-American author and academic (died 2023)
- 1928 – Nathan Oliveira, American painter and sculptor (died 2010)
- 1929 – Bob Brookmeyer, American trombonist, pianist, and composer (died 2011)
- 1929 – Gregory Carroll, American singer-songwriter and producer (died 2013)
- 1929 – David Douglas, 12th Marquess of Queensberry, Scottish potter
- 1929 – Howard Sackler, American playwright and screenwriter (died 1982)
- 1930 – Anca Giurchescu, Romanian academic (died 2015)
- 1930 – Knut Helle, Norwegian historian and professor (died 2015)
- 1930 – Wally Olins, English businessman and academic (died 2014)
- 1931 – Ginger Stanley, American model, actress and stunt woman (died 2023)
- 1932 – Salvador Elizondo, Mexican author, poet, playwright, and critic (died 2006)
- 1932 – Lola Hendricks, African American civil rights activist (died 2013)
- 1932 – Wayne Tippit, American actor (died 2009)
- 1933 – Kevan Gosper, Australian runner and politician (died 2024)
- 1933 – Christopher Smout, Scottish historian and academic
- 1934 – Al Kaline, American baseball player and sportscaster (died 2020)
- 1934 – Pratibha Patil, Indian lawyer and politician, 12th President of India
- 1934 – Casper R. Taylor, Jr., American lawyer and politician (died 2023)
- 1935 – Tony Taylor, Cuban baseball player and coach (died 2020)
- 1935 – Bobby Timmons, American pianist and composer (died 1974)
- 1935 – Joanne Weaver, American baseball player (died 2000)
- 1938 – Jay Arnette, American basketball player
- 1940 – Phil Ochs, American singer-songwriter and guitarist (died 1976)
- 1941 – Lee Myung-bak, South Korean businessman and politician, 10th President of South Korea
- 1941 – Maurice White, American singer-songwriter and producer (died 2016)
- 1942 – Cornell Dupree, American guitarist (died 2011)
- 1942 – Gene Okerlund, American sports announcer (died 2019)
- 1943 – James L. Jones, American general and politician, 22nd United States National Security Advisor
- 1943 – Elaine Joyce, American actress, singer, and dancer
- 1943 – Ross M. Lence, American political scientist and academic (died 2006)
- 1944 – William Christie, American-French harpsichord player and conductor
- 1944 – Mitchell Feigenbaum, American physicist and mathematician (died 2019)
- 1944 – Martin Hume Johnson, English physiologist and academic
- 1944 – Richard Leakey, Kenyan paleontologist and politician (died 2022)
- 1944 – Alvin Lee, English singer-songwriter and guitarist (died 2013)
- 1944 – Tim Reid, American actor and director
- 1944 – Steve Tyrell, American singer-songwriter and producer
- 1944 – Zal Yanovsky, Canadian singer-songwriter and guitarist (died 2002)
- 1945 – John McEuen, American singer-songwriter and guitarist
- 1946 – Rosemary Conley, English businesswoman, author, and broadcaster
- 1946 – Robert Urich, American actor and producer (died 2002)
- 1947 – Jimmy Bain, Scottish bass player and songwriter (died 2016)
- 1948 – Ken Brown, Canadian ice hockey player and sportscaster (died 2022)
- 1949 – Orna Berry, Israeli computer scientist and businesswoman
- 1949 – Claudia Kolb, American swimmer
- 1949 – Sebastian, Danish singer-songwriter and guitarist
- 1949 – Lenny White, American musician
- 1951 – Mohammad Reza Aref, Iranian engineer and politician, 2nd Vice President of Iran
- 1951 – Alan Rouse, English mountaineer and author (died 1986)
- 1952 – Walter Murphy, American pianist and composer
- 1954 – Jeff Allam, English race car driver
- 1954 – Tim Parks, English author and translator
- 1955 – Lincoln Hall, Australian mountaineer and author (died 2012)
- 1955 – Rob Portman, American lawyer and politician
- 1956 – Phil Harris, American captain and fisherman (died 2010)
- 1956 – Tom Lawless, American baseball player and manager
- 1956 – Shane McEntee, Irish farmer and politician, Minister of State at the Department of Agriculture, Food and the Marine (died 2012)
- 1956 – Merzbow, Japanese noise musician
- 1957 – Cyril Collard, French actor, director, and composer (died 1993)
- 1957 – Kevin McHale, American basketball player, coach, and manager
- 1958 – Steven Isserlis, English cellist and author
- 1958 – Limahl, English pop singer
- 1959 – Iván Vallejo, Ecuadorian mountaineer
- 1959 – Lisa Wilkinson, Australian television host and journalist
- 1960 – Derrick Jensen, American author and activist
- 1960 – Michelangelo Signorile, American journalist and author
- 1961 – Scott Cohen, American actor
- 1961 – Eric Allin Cornell, American physicist and academic, Nobel Prize laureate
- 1961 – Matthew Waterhouse, English actor and author
- 1961 – Reggie White, American football player and wrestler (died 2004)
- 1962 – Gary Fleder, American director, producer, and screenwriter
- 1963 – Jennifer Beals, American model and actress
- 1963 – Til Schweiger, German actor, director, and producer
- 1964 – Béatrice Dalle, French actress
- 1964 – Lorie Kane, Canadian golfer
- 1964 – Randall McDaniel, American football player
- 1964 – Arvydas Sabonis, Lithuanian basketball player
- 1965 – Chito Martínez, Belizean-American baseball player
- 1966 – Chuckii Booker, American singer-songwriter and producer
- 1966 – Rajesh Chauhan, Indian cricketer
- 1966 – Robert MacNaughton, American actor
- 1966 – Alberto Tomba, Italian skier
- 1966 – Eric Weinrich, American ice hockey player and coach
- 1967 – Criss Angel, American magician
- 1967 – Charles Austin, American high jumper
- 1968 – Kristina Keneally, American-Australian politician, 42nd Premier of New South Wales
- 1968 – Ken Marino, American actor, director, producer, and screenwriter
- 1969 – Michael Bates, American sprinter and football player
- 1969 – Tom Gugliotta, American basketball player
- 1969 – Richard Hammond, English journalist and producer
- 1969 – Nayan Mongia, Indian cricketer
- 1969 – Aziza Mustafa Zadeh, Azerbaijani composer, pianist, and singer
- 1969 – Kristy Swanson, American actress
- 1970 – Tyson Beckford, American model and actor
- 1970 – Robert Lang, Czech ice hockey player
- 1971 – Amy Locane, American actress
- 1971 – Karen Pickering, English swimmer
- 1972 – Rosa Blasi, American actress
- 1972 – Alyssa Milano, American actress, television personality, and activist
- 1972 – Warren Sapp, American football player and analyst
- 1973 – Michalis Grigoriou, Greek footballer and coach
- 1973 – Erick Wainaina, Kenyan runner
- 1973 – Zulfiya Zabirova, Russian cyclist
- 1973 – Takashi Sorimachi, Japanese actor and singer
- 1974 – Eduard Ivakdalam, Indonesian footballer
- 1974 – Joe Jurevicius, American football player
- 1974 – Felipe Lopez, Dominican-American basketball player
- 1974 – Jake Plummer, American football player and sportscaster
- 1974 – Ricky Ponting, Australian cricketer and sportscaster
- 1974 – Mige (musician), Finnish musician, bassist and founding member of the gothic rock band HIM
- 1975 – Makis Belevonis, Greek footballer
- 1975 – Brandon Sanderson, American author and academic
- 1975 – Jeremy Soule, American composer
- 1975 – Olivier Tébily, Ivorian-French footballer
- 1975 – Dean Treister, Australian rugby league player
- 1977 – Jorge Garbajosa, Spanish basketball player
- 1977 – LaTasha Jenkins, American sprinter
- 1977 – Irina Voronina, Russian model
- 1977 – Elisa (Italian singer), Italian singer, songwriter and record producer.
- 1978 – Patrick Casey, American actor, producer, and screenwriter
- 1979 – Kevin Devine, American singer-songwriter and guitarist
- 1979 – Rafael Soriano, Dominican baseball player
- 1980 – Jake Gyllenhaal, American actor and producer
- 1980 – Marla Sokoloff, American actress and musician
- 1981 – Grégory Dufer, Belgian footballer
- 1982 – Mo Williams, American basketball player
- 1983 – Nektarios Alexandrou, Cypriot footballer
- 1983 – Casey Crescenzo, American singer-songwriter and guitarist
- 1983 – Bridget Phillipson, English politician
- 1983 – Laura Pomeroy, Canadian swimmer
- 1983 – Matt Stajan, Canadian ice hockey player
- 1984 – Ian Kennedy, American baseball player
- 1985 – Andrea Baldini, Italian fencer
- 1985 – Gary Cahill, English footballer
- 1985 – Neil Kilkenny, English-Australian footballer
- 1985 – Sally Kipyego, Kenyan runner
- 1985 – Dan Logan, English bass player
- 1985 – Lady Sovereign, English rapper
- 1986 – Calvin Andrew, English footballer
- 1986 – Lauren Boebert, American politician
- 1986 – Ryan Babel, Dutch footballer
- 1986 – Ingrid Burley, American rapper and songwriter
- 1986 – Lazaros Christodoulopoulos, Greek footballer
- 1986 – Zuzana Hejnová, Czech hurdler
- 1986 – Miguel Lopes, Portuguese footballer
- 1986 – Annie Murphy, Canadian actress
- 1987 – Cédric Baseya, French-Congolese footballer
- 1987 – Karim Benzema, French footballer
- 1987 – Ronan Farrow, American activist, journalist, and lawyer
- 1988 – Alexis Sánchez, Chilean footballer
- 1988 – Peter Winn, English footballer
- 1989 – Yong Jun-hyung, South Korean singer-songwriter, rapper and producer
- 1989 – Michał Masłowski, Polish footballer
- 1989 – Kousei Miura, Japanese jockey
- 1989 – Hamza Riazuddin, English cricketer
- 1990 – Greg Bretz, American snowboarder
- 1990 – Torrey Craig, American basketball player
- 1991 – Steven Berghuis, Dutch footballer
- 1991 – Declan Galbraith, English singer-songwriter
- 1991 – Josh Huestis, American basketball player
- 1991 – Keiynan Lonsdale, Australian actor, singer-songwriter, and dancer
- 1991 – Sumire Uesaka, Japanese voice actress and singer
- 1992 – Iker Muniain, Spanish footballer
- 1992 – Raphael Spiegel, Swiss footballer
- 1993 – Young K, South Korean singer-songwriter
- 1993 – Isiah Koech, Kenyan runner
- 1994 – Maudy Ayunda, Indonesian actress and singer-songwriter
- 1994 – M'Baye Niang, French footballer
- 1996 – Franck Kessié, Ivorian footballer
- 1997 – Gabriel Magalhães, Brazilian footballer
- 1997 – Fikayo Tomori, English footballer
- 1998 – King Princess, American singer-songwriter and musician

== Deaths ==
=== Pre-1600 ===
- 401 – Pope Anastasius I
- 966 – Sancho I, king of León
- 1091 – Adelaide of Susa, margravine of Turin
- 1111 – Al-Ghazali, Persian jurist, philosopher, theologian, and mystic (born 1058)
- 1123 – Saint Berardo, Italian bishop and saint
- 1327 – Agnes of France, Duchess of Burgundy (born 1260)
- 1370 – Pope Urban V (born 1310)
- 1442 – Elizabeth of Luxembourg (born 1409)
- 1385 – Bernabò Visconti, Lord of Milan (born 1319)
- 1558 – Cornelius Grapheus, Flemish writer (born 1482)

=== 1601–1900 ===
- 1637 – Christina of Lorraine, Grand Duchess consort of Tuscany (born 1565)
- 1741 – Vitus Bering, Danish-born Russian explorer (born 1681)
- 1745 – Jean-Baptiste van Loo, French painter (born 1684)
- 1749 – Francesco Antonio Bonporti, Italian priest and composer (born 1672)
- 1807 – Friedrich Melchior, Baron von Grimm, German-French author and playwright (born 1723)
- 1813 – James McGill, Scottish-Canadian businessman and philanthropist, founded McGill University (born 1744)
- 1819 – Thomas Fremantle, English admiral and politician (born 1765)
- 1848 – Emily Brontë, English novelist and poet (born 1818)
- 1851 – Joseph Mallord William Turner, English painter (born 1775)
- 1878 – Bayard Taylor, American author and poet (born 1825)
- 1899 – Henry Ware Lawton, American general (born 1843)

=== 1901–present ===
- 1915 – Alois Alzheimer, German psychiatrist and neuropathologist (born 1864)
- 1916 – Thibaw Min, Burmese king (born 1859)
- 1927 – Ashfaqulla Khan, Indian activist (born 1900)
- 1927 – Ram Prasad Bismil, Indian poet and activist (born 1897)
- 1932 – Yun Bong-gil, South Korean activist (born 1908)
- 1933 – George Jackson Churchward, English engineer and businessman (born 1857)
- 1938 – Stephen Warfield Gambrill, American lawyer and politician (born 1873)
- 1940 – Kyösti Kallio, Finnish politician, the 4th President of Finland (born 1873)
- 1944 – Abbas II of Egypt (born 1874)
- 1944 – Rudolph Karstadt, German businessman (born 1856)
- 1946 – Paul Langevin, French physicist and academic (born 1872)
- 1953 – Robert Andrews Millikan, American physicist and eugenicist, Nobel Prize laureate (born 1868)
- 1968 – Norman Thomas, American minister and politician (born 1884)
- 1972 – Ahmet Emin Yalman, Turkish journalist, author, and academic (born 1888)
- 1976 – Giuseppe Caselli, Italian painter (born 1893)
- 1982 – Dwight Macdonald, American philosopher, author, and critic (born 1906)
- 1984 – Joy Ridderhof, American missionary (born 1903)
- 1986 – V. C. Andrews, American author (born 1923)
- 1986 – Werner Dankwort, Russian-German colonel and diplomat (born 1895)
- 1987 – August Mälk, Estonian author, playwright, and politician (born 1900)
- 1988 – Robert Bernstein, American author and playwright (born 1919)
- 1988 – Win Maw Oo, Burmese student activist (born 1971)
- 1989 – Stella Gibbons, English journalist, author, and poet (born 1902)
- 1989 – Kirill Mazurov, Belarusian Soviet politician (born 1914)
- 1993 – Michael Clarke, American drummer (born 1946)
- 1996 – Marcello Mastroianni, Italian-French actor and singer (born 1924)
- 1997 – Sara Northrup Hollister, American occultist (born 1924)
- 1997 – Masaru Ibuka, Japanese businessman, co-founded Sony (born 1908)
- 1997 – Jimmy Rogers, American singer-songwriter and guitarist (born 1924)
- 1998 – Mel Fisher, American treasure hunter (born 1922)
- 1999 – Desmond Llewelyn, Welsh soldier and actor (born 1914)
- 2000 – Rob Buck, American guitarist and songwriter (born 1958)
- 2000 – Milt Hinton, American bassist and photographer (born 1910)
- 2000 – John Lindsay, American lawyer and politician, 103rd Mayor of New York City (born 1921)
- 2002 – Will Hoy, English race car driver (born 1952)
- 2002 – Arthur Rowley, English footballer and manager (born 1926)
- 2002 – George Weller, American author, playwright, and journalist (born 1907)
- 2003 – Peter Carter-Ruck, English lawyer, founded Carter-Ruck (born 1914)
- 2003 – Hope Lange, American actress (born 1933)
- 2004 – Herbert C. Brown, English-American chemist and academic, Nobel Prize laureate (born 1912)
- 2004 – Renata Tebaldi, Italian soprano and actress (born 1922)
- 2005 – Vincent Gigante, American mobster (born 1927)
- 2008 – James Bevel, American minister and activist (born 1936)
- 2008 – Carol Chomsky, American linguist and educator (born 1930)
- 2008 – Michael Connell, American political consultant (born 1963)
- 2008 – Dock Ellis, American baseball player and coach (born 1945)
- 2009 – Kim Peek, American megasavant (born 1951)
- 2010 – Anthony Howard, English journalist and author (born 1934)
- 2012 – Robert Bork, American lawyer, judge, and scholar, United States Attorney General (born 1927)
- 2012 – Amnon Lipkin-Shahak, Israeli general and politician, 22nd Transportation Minister of Israel (born 1944)
- 2012 – Larry Morris, American football player (born 1933)
- 2012 – Peter Struck, German lawyer and politician, 13th German Federal Minister of Defence (born 1943)
- 2013 – Winton Dean, English musicologist and author (born 1916)
- 2013 – Al Goldstein, American publisher and pornographer (born 1936)
- 2013 – Ned Vizzini, American author and screenwriter (born 1981)
- 2014 – S. Balasubramanian, Indian journalist and director (born 1936)
- 2014 – Philip Bradbourn, English lawyer and politician (born 1951)
- 2014 – Arthur Gardner, American actor and producer (born 1910)
- 2014 – Igor Rodionov, Russian general and politician, 3rd Russian Minister of Defence (born 1936)
- 2014 – Dick Thornton, American-Canadian football player and coach (born 1939)
- 2014 – Roberta Leigh (Rita Shulman Lewin), British writer, artist and TV producer (born 1926).
- 2015 – Jimmy Hill, English footballer, manager, and sportscaster (born 1928)
- 2015 – Greville Janner, Baron Janner of Braunstone, Welsh-English lawyer and politician (born 1928)
- 2015 – Karin Söder, Swedish educator and politician, 33rd Swedish Minister for Foreign Affairs (born 1928)
- 2016 – Andrei Karlov, Russian diplomat, Ambassador to Turkey (born 1954)
- 2020 – Rosalind Knight, English actress (born 1933)
- 2021 – Sally Ann Howes, English-American singer and actress (born 1930)
- 2021 – Johnny Isakson, American politician (born 1944)
- 2024 – Michael Leunig, Australian cartoonist (born 1945)
- 2024 – Wincey Willis, British broadcaster (born 1948)

== Holidays and observances ==
- Christian feast day:
  - Lillian Trasher (Episcopal Church)
  - O Radix
  - Pope Anastasius I
  - Pope Urban V
  - December 19 (Eastern Orthodox liturgics)
  - Saint Nicholas Day
- Goa Liberation Day (Goa, India)
- National Heroes and Heroines Day (Anguilla)
