= WOO HAH! =

Music festival

- Genre: Hip Hop, R&B, Electronic
- Dates: 1-2-3 July
- Locations: Hilvarenbeek, Netherlands
- Years active: 2014–2022
- Organiser: Mojo Concerts, 013 Poppodium
- Website: www.woohahfestival.com

WOO HAH! was a hip hop festival that took place every year in Tilburg since 2014. The festival was being organised by Mojo Concerts and 013 Poppodium and used took place at an area called "Spoorzone" from 2014 to 2017. Since 2018, the festival had been moved to Safaripark Beekse Bergen in Hilvarenbeek.

The line-up existed of a combination of international artists and upcoming talent. The festival offered more than music e.g., fashion, sport and art. Besides that there was a skate hall where professional skaters demonstrated their skills and artists painted with graffiti during the festival.

In 2017 the festival grew from a one day event to a two day event which eventually in 2018 became a three day event. During the build-up phase, provided by the previous editions, the festival started to get subsidy from Brabant C.

WOO HAH! took place since 2018 on a different location and increased the duration to a three day festival. In 2018 the first lustrum edition took place at Safaripark Beekse Bergen in Hilvarenbeek on the 13th, 14th and 15 July

Due to the outbreak of COVID-19 virus, the 2020 edition got officially cancelled. Later that year it was announced that the 2021 edition also got cancelled.

On December 8 of 2021 it was announced that WOO HAH! is collaborating with the American festival organiser Rolling Loud. Rolling Loud is the largest hiphop festival brand in the world.

In November 2022, the organisation of WOO HAH! announced that it would continue as Rolling Loud and that the venue would move to Rotterdam Ahoy. In conjunction with the disappearance of the WOO HAH! name, festival director Ruud Lemmen announced that he would also be leaving the festival. The announcement that WOO HAH! would be disappearing from the festival circuit was met with much criticism from supporters.

== Editions ==
Year	Line-Up
2014	Method Man & Redman, Chance The Rapper, Mos Def, Earl Sweatshirt, Dope D.O.D., YG, Danny Brown, De Jeugd van Tegenwoordig, Isaiah Rashad, Great Minds, Dret & Krulle, Typhoon, Hef & Crooks, Digitzz, Reazun, Diggy Dex, Ares, Timmietex, Aer
2015	Cypress Hill, Run The Jewels, Joey Bada$$, Big Sean, Travis Scott, Freddie Gibbs, Cannibal Ox, The Underachievers, Vince Staples, Lapalux, Denzel Curry, Jameszoo X James Pants, CJ Fly, Fresku, Your Old Droog, Winne x Feis x Ecktuh Ecktuh, GANZ, Remi, Cho, MocroManiac, Deux Deux, Doomtree, Tourist LeMC, Freez + A.R.T., Tom Maas
2016	ScHoolboy Q, Young Thug, Action Bronson, ASAP Ferg, Tyler, The Creator, Rico & Sticks #OpgezwolleTotNu, Skepta, Noisia, Vic Mensa, Mick Jenkins, Kevin Gates, Little Simz, Immortal Technique, Father, Stööki Sound, A-F-R-O, Sevn Alias, Loscobeats, Woodie Smalls, SMIB, Vic Crezée, Braz, Nanah Dae
2017	Bryson Tiller, Travis Scott, Gucci Mane, G-Eazy, Mac Miller, Nas, Post Malone, Rae Sremmurd, MHD, Flatbush Zombies, Stormzy, Hopsin, Playboi Carti, Lil Dicky, Oneman, Young M.A, Freddie Gibbs, Princess Nokia, Clams Casino, Troyboi, Fresku, Mocromaniac, Braz, Pietju Bell, Woenzelaar, Killer Kamal, Kempi, Jonna Fraser, $uicideboy$, Grandtheft, Hucci, Coely, AJ Tracey, Ivy Lab, Benji B, 67, Hilltop Hoods, Tasha the Amazon, Jarreau, Vandal, Gravez, Yung Internet, Yung Nnelg, Ray Fuego, Kevin, Josylvio, Hannah Faith, Nick Hook, Roméo Elvis & Le Motel, Anbu, Siroj, Vic Crezée, Iliassopdebeat, Kringili & Alex Megas, Aristoteles Mendes, Paquito Moniz, Odin, Ares, Leafs
2018	Lil Pump, J. Cole, Joey Badass, Blackbear, Ski Mask The Slump God, Goldlink, J Hus, Belly, Mist, 6lack, Sevn Alias, Bokoesam, Leafs, Jacin Trill, Ares, ASAP Rocky, Migos, Action Bronson, Rich Brian, Cashmere Cat, Smoke Purpp, Denzel Curry, Flonti Stacks, A Boogie Wit Da Hoodie, ASAP Twelvyy, Night Lovell, Mula B, Beats By Esko, 3robi, Zwangere Guy, Scarlxrd, Rejjie Snow
2019	Travis Scott, Brockhampton, Rae Sremmurd, Skepta, $uicideboy$, Gunna, Sheck Wes, Stormzy, Aminé, Trippie Redd, Rich The Kid, Schoolboy Q, Comethazine, YBN Cordae, Jay Rock, Flatbush Zombies, Young Ellens, Beats by Esko, Goldlink, Ocean Wisdom, JID, Jpegmaffia, Dopebwoy, Tabon Yemek, Snelle
2022	J.Cole, Future, Dave, Roddy Ricch, 6LACK, ADF Samski, Albi X, Ares, Ashafar, Baby Keem, Bas, Central Cee, Cho, City Morgue, Coi Leray, Cor, Christian D, D-Block Europe, DDG, Dikke, Don Toliver, Fivio Foreign, Flo Milli, Frenna, Headie One, Hef, Ho99o9, IDK, Iliassopdebeat, Ivorian Doll, Jack Harlow, Jiri11, Joost, Josylvio, Ken Carson, Kevin & the Animals, Key Glock, La$$a, Lancey Foux, Lauwtje, Lijpe, Lionstorm, M Huncho, Ms Banks, Mula B, Pi'erre Bourne, Playboi Carti, Polo G, Ray Fuego, Rico Nasty, Sevn Alias, Sofaygo, Sor, $hirak, $KEER&BOO$, Trippie Redd, Trobi, Yade Lauren, Yssi SB, Zwangere Guy
