= Albin Małysiak =

20th and 21st-century Polish Catholic bishop

The Right Reverend Albin Małysiak, C.M.
- Auxiliary Bishop of Kraków
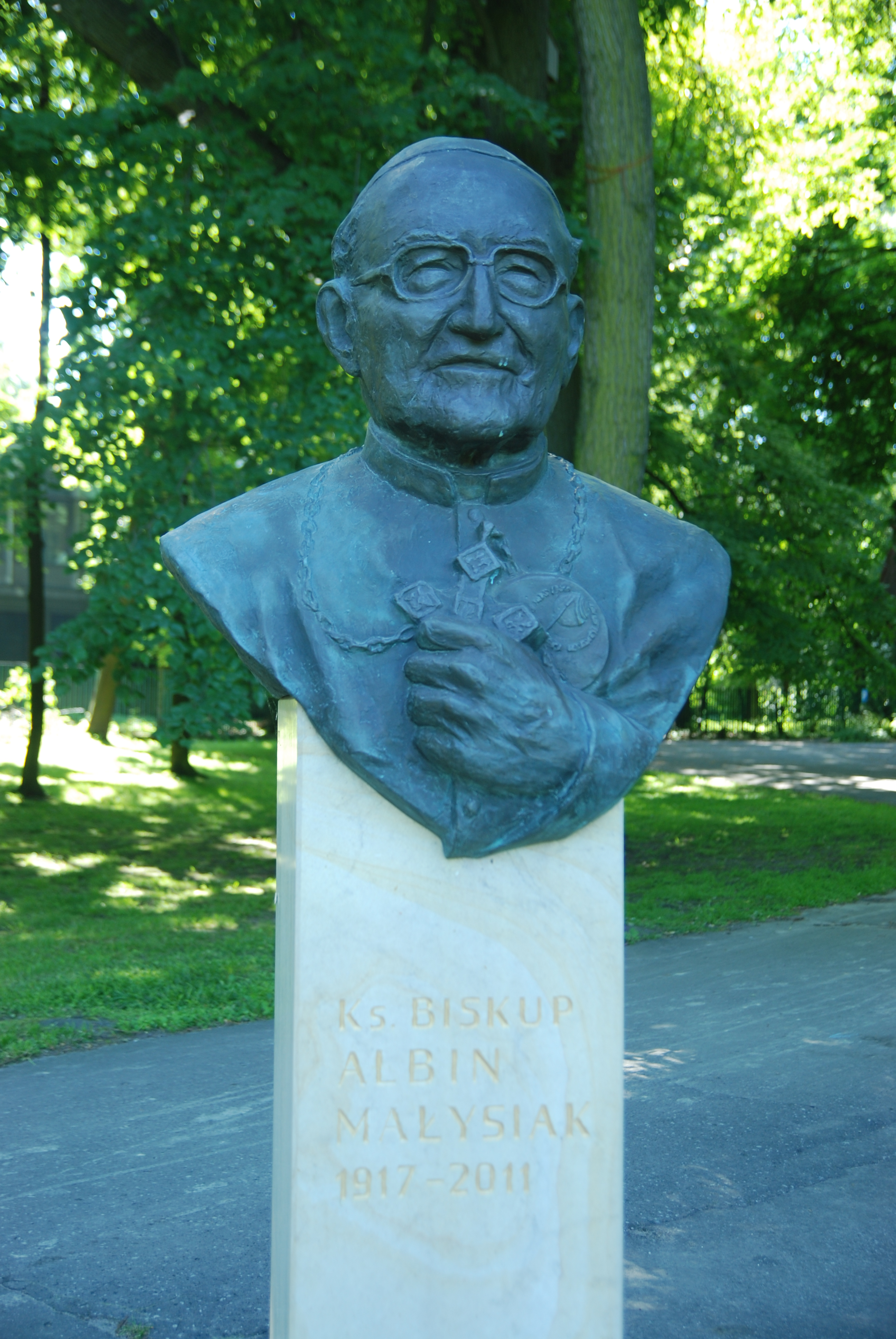
- Małysiak bust in Park Jordana, Krakow
- See: Beatia
- In office: 1970–1993

Orders
- Ordination: 1 May 1941
- Consecration: 5 April 1970 by Karol Wojtyła

Personal details
- Born: 12 June 1917 Kocoń, Kingdom of Galicia and Lodomeria, Austria-Hungary
- Died: 16 July 2011 (aged 94) Kraków, Poland
- Denomination: Roman Catholic Church

Albin Małysiak C.M. (12 June 1917 – 16 July 2011) was a Polish bishop of the Roman Catholic Church. At the time of his death, he was one of the oldest Catholic bishops and the oldest Polish bishop. He was also a Righteous Among the Nations, having sheltered several Jews during the war.

== Biography ==
Małysiak was born in Kocoń, now Poland, in 1917, and was ordained a priest on 1 May 1941 in the religious institute, the Congregation of the Mission.

He was a chaplain at a hospice (Helcls Home for the Aged and Retarded in Kraków - Dom Ubogich im. Ludwika i Anny Helclów) during the World War II, where, together with Sister Bronisława Wilemska sheltered five Jews in their hospice; for that he was recognized as Righteous Among the Nations in 1993.

He was appointed titular bishop of Beatia and auxiliary bishop of the Archdiocese of Kraków on 14 January 1970 and ordained on 5 April 1970. Małysiak remained auxiliary bishop of the diocese until his retirement on 27 February 1993.
