= Ray Smith =

Ray Smith may refer to:

== Sportspeople ==
- Ray Smith (center) (1908–1984), American football player
- Ray Smith (cricketer) (1914–1996), English cricketer
- A. Ray Smith (1915–1999), American baseball executive
- Ray Gene Smith (1928–2005), American football player
- Ray Smith (footballer, born 1929) (1929–2017), English football wing half for Luton and Southend
- Ray Smith (racewalker) (1929–2010), Australian Olympic athlete
- Ray Smith (footballer, born 1934) (1934–2024), English football forward for Hull, Peterborough, Northampton and Luton
- Ray Smith (rugby league), Australian rugby league footballer who played in the 1950s
- Ray Smith (running back) (born c. 1937), American gridiron football player
- Ray Smith (American football coach) (born 1938), American football and Canadian football player and coach
- Ray Smith (footballer, born 1943) (born 1943), English football forward for Southend, Wrexham and Peterborough
- Ray Smith (Australian footballer) (born 1948), Australian rules footballer from Queensland
- Ray Smith (catcher) (born 1955), American baseball player and manager

== Others ==
- Ray B. Smith (1867–1939), American lawyer and politician from New York
- Ray Smith (country singer) (1918–1979), American country musician
- Ray F. Smith (1919–1999), American entomologist and educator
- Ray Smith (Australian politician) (1920–2002), member of the Queensland Legislative Assembly
- Ray S. Smith Jr. (1924–2007), member of the Arkansas House of Representatives
- Ray Smith (rockabilly singer) (1934–1979), American rockabilly music pioneer who had a hit with "Rockin' Little Angel"
- Ray Smith (actor) (1936–1991), Welsh actor
- Ray Smith (bishop) (born 1936), Australian Anglican bishop
- Ray Smith (author) (1941–2019), Canadian writer
- Ray L. Smith, United States Marine Corps major general
- Ray Smith (artist) (1949–2018), English sculptor, painter and illustrator
- Ray Smith (businessman), American businessman
- Ray Smith, software engineer who developed the Tesseract OCR software

== See also ==
- Raymond Smith (disambiguation)
