= Runaway train =

Train that is out of control

A runaway train is a type of railroad incident in which unattended rolling stock is accidentally allowed to roll onto the main line, a moving train loses enough braking power to be unable to stop in safety, or a train operates at unsafe speeds due to loss of operator control. If the uncontrolled rolling stock derails or hits another train, it will result in a train wreck.

A dead man's control, if the brakes are working, can prevent unattended rolling stock from moving.

A railway air brake can fail if valves on the pipe between each wagon are accidentally closed; the 1953 Pennsylvania Railroad train wreck and the 1988 Gare de Lyon train accident were results of a valve accidentally closed by the crew, reducing braking power.

A parked train or cut off cars may also run away if not properly tied down with a sufficient number of hand brakes.

== Incidents ==
Accidents and incidents involving defective or improperly-set railway brakes include:

Date	Incident	Location	Cause	Details	Ref
February 25, 2024		Jammu, India	Driver negligence	A 53-wagon Indian Railways train loaded with stone chips ran for 70 kilometres (43 mi) through the Indian states of Jammu and Kashmir and Punjab, starting at Kathua in Jammu before being stopped by railway officials at Hoshiarpur. The driver and his assistant had gotten off the train while it was on a slope. The incident took place between 7:25 am and 9:00, and the train managed to run through five stations and reached speeds of nearly 100 kilometres per hour (62 mph).	
August 22, 2019		Upper Palatinate, Germany	Improper brake setup	A 1900 t freight train with two engines ran without brakes 90 kilometres (56 mi) through Upper Palatine, starting at Cheb near the Czech border and coming to a stop safely on flat terrain in Irrenlohe. Brakes were ineffective due to a closed angle cock between the locomotives and the first car of the train.	
February 27, 2019	Ramses Station rail disaster	Ramses Station, Cairo, Egypt	Train driver left train to fight with another train driver	After the driver exited the train, which had no brakes applied, it entered Ramses Station at high speed and crashed through a barrier. The locomotive's fuel tanks ruptured and exploded upon impact, killing 25 people and injuring 50 others.	
2018		Port Hedland, Australia	Train driver left engine to inspect a wagon	An iron ore train consisting of 4 locomotives and 268 loaded wagons en route from Newman to Port Hedland (operated by BHP on the Pilbara railways) travelled driverless for 92 kilometres (57 mi) at high speed, after the driver went out to inspect. The company deliberately derailed the train to avoid an uncontrolled incident.	
2017		Wadi, India		An electric locomotive traveled without a driver for 13 kilometres (8.1 mi) after it was being swapped for a diesel locomotive to pull the train on a non-electrified section of track. Railway personnel chased after the locomotive by motorbike, and the train was stopped safely after 50 minutes	
December 22, 2017		North of Brenner, Austria	Improper brake setup	While setting up the lead engine, the driver closed the angle cock between lead and slave unit to perform the ATP test. He forgot to open the cock before departure. The train went down the 2.5% grade North ramp of the Brenner Railway and reached a speed of 125 kilometres per hour (78 mph) before cars at the end of the train derailed and broke off emptying the brake pipe. Despite the second locomotive being coupled to the brake pipe, it did not vent it because the emergency brake signal from the first unit was not transmitted over the train bus.	
2016		Landen, Belgium	Driver error	The driver left the cabin to do some check-ups on the train when it started moving. After 30 minutes and 12 kilometres (7.5 mi), the train was stopped by a driver who jumped into the train's cab. No one was injured nor did the train hit anything.	
2013	Lac-Mégantic rail disaster	Lac-Mégantic, Quebec, Canada	Combination of neglect, defective locomotive, poor maintenance, driver error, flawed operating procedures, weak regulatory oversight, lack of safety redundancy	The train driver did not set enough hand brakes (5 on the engines, one on the caboose, and one on the boxcar) to stop the 72-car crude oil train from rolling down the slope, the train rolled down the slope and derailed in a curve at high speed. Several tank cars burst and caught fire, killing 47 people	
2012		Ion Luca Caragiale village, Romania	Improper brake setup	A freight train ran away from Lon Luca Caragiale Station because of the improper brakes setting and hit a Dacia car on a level crossing, killing 2 people	
2011, August 11		Mainline between Yeral and Simskaya, Chelyabinsk oblast, Russia	Brake control deactivated during en-route maintenance	A freight train with inoperative brakes gained speed on a long descent and collided with a rear end of another freight train, killing the locomotive crew of 2.	
2010	2010 Pretoria train accident	Pretoria, Johannesburg, South Africa	During a locomotive changeover, the carriages ran away out of control for 12 miles (19 km) until they derailed at Pretoria	7 injuries and 3 deaths were reported with total damage to the carriages of about R15,000,000.	
June 15, 2010		Braz, West ramp of Arlbergbahn, Austria	Technical defect	A low hanging air coupling between two permanently coupled car racks got kicked by rails laying in track. It broke in two and the rear part ended up kinked and jammed in the underframe of the car rack. Air was bottled in the rear part of the train leaving the brakes released. Train could only apply brakes of the locomotive and the first car on the 3.1% grade. Train derailed, driver was slightly injured.	
2007	Benaleka train accident	Congo-Kinshasa	Brake failure	100 killed	
May 17, 2006		Switzerland near Thun	Improper brake setup	During the brake test it was not discovered that the angle cock between the locomotive and the first car was still closed, rendering the car brakes inoperable. The construction train ran down the 1.5% grade of the North access ramp to the Lötschberg Tunnel. Dispatchers did not have any other option than diverting the train into an active construction site, which had to be evacuated on short notice. 3 died. The incident inspired the motion picture Der Geisterzug von Spiez.	
December 19, 2005	Świnna rail crash		Improperly manufactured composite brake blocks caused loss of braking power in EN57-840 EMU operating as passenger train between Sucha Beskidzka and Żywiec.	The cooperation between the crews of Sucha-Żywiec and Żywiec-Sucha trains and train dispatcher in Jeleśnia resulted in controlled collision near Świnna, Silesian Voivodeship instead of head-on collision. Both drivers and 6 passengers were injured.	
June 20, 2003		Los Angeles, United States	A cut of 31 freight cars rolled away after they were improperly secured and left unattended in a yard east of Los Angeles.	The train was derailed in Commerce at an estimated speed of 95 mph (153 km/h). 13 people suffered minor injuries.	
Feb 17, 2004	Nishapur train disaster	Nishapur, Iran	Under unclear circumstances, a consist of 51 wagons ran away.	The train derailed in Nishapur and exploded, causing extensive destruction to the surrounding area and the deaths of 295 people, with a further 460 injuries.	
2003	2003 Melbourne runaway train	Melbourne, Australia		11 people injured	
2002	Igandu train disaster	Tanzania		281 killed	
2002	Tenga rail disaster	Mozambique		192 killed	
May 15, 2001	CSX 8888 incident	Ohio, United States	Incorrectly configured dynamic brake. Train driver left train to pull switch, and was unable to get back onboard.	CSX #8888, an SD40-2, ran away under power without a crew after the engineer incorrectly set the locomotive's dynamic brake and was unable to get back into the locomotive after it began moving. The train - nicknamed Crazy Eights - proceeded to travel at speeds of over 50 km/h for just under 2 hours, being successfully brought to a halt by a second locomotive's crew, who were able to couple to the rear of the train and apply their brakes. The incident inspired the 2010 motion picture Unstoppable.	
1999		Martín Coronado, Argentina	Train's brakes failed during motoman's distraction, passing by six stations without him.	Stopped by a passerby train keeper after noticing hysterical people inside the train.	
1989		Colorado Springs, Colorado, United States		67-car Burlington Northern coal train runaway	
May 12, 1989	San Bernardino train disaster	California, United States	Train weight miscalculated and several locomotives with defective dynamic brakes.	A 6-engine (4 in front, 2 in rear) freight train carrying 69 loaded hopper cars lost control coming over Cajon Pass near San Bernardino, California. Due to the lack of dynamic brakes, and the air brakes melting due to the weight and speed, derailed on a sharp corner at 110 mph. The resulting collision killed two of the five crewmembers and two residents in San Bernardino. Also led to a pipeline explosion nearly a week later during cleanup, killing two more residents.	
February 2, 1989	1989 Helena train wreck	Helena, Montana	Failure of train crew to set brakes properly	49 cars of a Montana Rail Link freight train that had been decoupled from their locomotives by a train crew on Mullan Pass rolled backwards down the pass, traveling nine miles back into the city of Helena and colliding with a set of helper locomotives at a railway crossing near the center of the community. The collision resulted in a fire and explosion that damaged Carroll College and other nearby structures, knocked out power to most of the town, and led to the evacuation of residents within an area of 2 square miles (5.2 km2) due to concerns of possible toxic chemical release.	
1988		Wasserburg am Inn, Upper Bavaria, Germany	On New Years Eve morning an EMU of Munich S-Bahn became a runaway train after the train driver went to the toilet in the terminal station Ebersberg.	Train run the complete line till Wasserburg, where it ended at a buffer stop. The engineer was in the second engine while the conductor was in the caboose back at the rail yard. No injuries, but equipment was damaged.	
March 9, 1987		New Brunswick, Canada	Air hoses between locomotives & consist disconnected, communications error with the mine staff and the engineer	Canadian National ore train derailed at Bathurst Mining Camp	
1972	Chester General rail crash	England	Brake failure	Train collided with parked DMU.	
1959	Jersey Central "ghost engine" incident	New Jersey, United States	Incident suspected of being sabotage as throttle was open, and air brakes were set for running.	A single ALCO RS-3 locomotive of the Central Railroad of New Jersey left a terminal yard in Jersey City as a runaway and covered 22 miles in 36 minutes before it was stopped by a crewed locomotive on the tracks ahead.	
1957		Chapel-en-le-Frith, Great Britain	Broken steam pipe made it impossible for crew to apply brakes		
1953	Federal Express train wreck	Union Station, Washington, DC	Valve closed by badly designed buffer plate.	The 16-car passenger train failed to stop in time before jumping the buffers at Union Station. No one was killed, but the engine was left in the basement due to the inauguration of President Dwight D. Eisenhower occurring so that other trains could come into the station.	
1948		Wädenswil, Switzerland	Driver of the crocodile locomotive did not realise that he was in electric traction instead of dynamic brake while going downhill on a 5% grade.	Winter sport train was guided deliberately in a siding. 21 killed	
1944	Torre del Bierzo rail disaster	Spain	Brake failure on overloaded passenger train.	Train which collided with another in a tunnel; a third train was unaware and also crashed into it.	
1898		Asheboro, North Carolina	Aberdeen and Asheboro Railroad crew uncouples a locomotive from a freight train without setting the brakes on the cars properly	The uncoupled cars roll downhill to collide with the locomotive, pinning the engine crew.	
1895	Montparnasse derailment	Paris, France	Paris Express overran the buffer stop at its Gare Montparnasse terminus when its air brakes failed	Train crashed through the entire station, and fell onto the Place de Rennes killing one woman; five on the train and one in the street were injured.	
1889	Armagh rail disaster	Ireland		80 people killed, 260 injured. Backwards runaway led to change in law.	
1874	Shipton-on-Cherwell train crash	Oxford, England		Caused by fracture of a carriage wheel.	

== See also ==
- Dark territory
- Positive train control
- Railroad Safety Appliance Act
- Category:Runaway train disasters
