= 2Sdxrt3all =

2SDxrt3all
- Born: Deveon Stetan Hinton; December 5, 2004 (age 21)
- Origin: Atlanta, Georgia
- Genres: Hip hop; rage
- Occupations: Rapper; Singer; Songwriter
- Years active: 2022–present
- Label: 2solid

Deveon Stefan Hinton (born December 5, 2004), known professionally as 2Sdxrt3all (Pronounced as "Dirtball"), is an American rapper, singer, and songwriter.

== Career ==
Hinton released his first song, "Call of Duty", on August 22, 2022. His debut project, titled Did It for Twn, had 12 tracks and a feature from Profitchild. In 2023, he released his track "Signed A Deal (LeBron James)", which went viral on social media due to his flow and lyricism. Shortly after the single's release, Hinton would release his mixtape Gotta Be Geeked. In 2024, Hinton made his debut Rolling Loud performance in Miami.
