= Gmina Andrychów =

Gmina Andrychów Andrychów Commune
- Gmina
- Flag Coat of arms
- Interactive map of Gmina Andrychów
- Coordinates (Andrychów): 49°52′N 19°20′E
- Country: Poland
- Voivodeship: Lesser Poland
- County: Wadowice
- Seat: Andrychów

Area
  - Total: 100.6 km^{2} (38.8 sq mi)

Population (2006)
  - Total: 42,893
  - Density: 426.4/km^{2} (1,104/sq mi)
  - Urban: 21,691
  - Rural: 21,202
- Website: andrychow.eu

Gmina Andrychów is an urban-rural gmina (administrative district) in Wadowice County, Lesser Poland Voivodeship, in southern Poland. Its seat is the town of Andrychów, which lies approximately 13 kilometres (8 mi) west of Wadowice and 49 km (30 mi) south-west of the regional capital Kraków.

The gmina covers an area of 100.6 square kilometres (38.8 sq mi), and as of 2006 its total population is 42,893 (of which the population of Andrychów is 21,691, and the population of the rural part of the gmina is 21,202).

== Villages ==
Apart from the town of Andrychów, Gmina Andrychów contains the villages and settlements of Brzezinka, Inwałd, Roczyny, Rzyki, Sułkowice, Targanice and Zagórnik.

== Neighbouring gminas ==
Gmina Andrychów is bordered by the gminas of Kęty, Łękawica, Porąbka, Ślemień, Stryszawa and Wieprz.
