= Rolling Loud =

International hip hop music festival

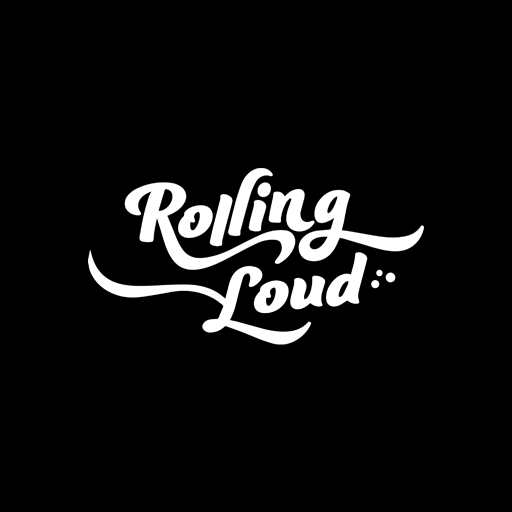
- Genre: Hip hop
- Locations: United States; Australia; Canada; Europe; India; Thailand
- Years active: 2015–present
- Founders: Matt Zingler; Tariq Cherif
- Capacity: 75,000
- Website: www.rollingloud.com

Rolling Loud is an international hip hop music festival which has been held in Asia, North America, South America, Europe, and Australia. Established in 2015, it is "one of the biggest festivals in the world" according to Complex, while Billboard called it "the be-all of hip-hop festivals". In 2019, an estimated 210,000 people attended the event in Miami.

== History ==
The festival was founded in 2015 by Matt Zingler and Tariq Cherif, who met in elementary school in Hollywood, Florida. Once in high school, the pair began organizing and promoting parties which "leaned heavily on a mix of Southern and Midwestern rap". They moved on to professional live music events in 2010, beginning with an after-party headlined by Rick Ross. By the summer of 2013, they were hosting monthly events in Miami featuring up-and-coming artists like Travis Scott and Kendrick Lamar. The pair also promoted artists from Florida's burgeoning SoundCloud rap scene under the brand name Dope Entertainment before noticing the need for a genre-specific music festival.

The first Rolling Loud took place in Miami in February 2015 and featured artists such as Schoolboy Q, Juicy J, Currensy, and Action Bronson in the one-day event. It took place at Soho Studios in the Wynwood district of the city, though the venue was temporarily flooded during the event due to rain.

In 2016, Rolling Loud was held at the larger Mana Wynwood convention center and featured Ty Dolla $ign, Young Thug, and Future as the headlining acts.

In 2017, Rolling Loud moved to Bayfront Park in Downtown Miami. Since 2018, it has been hosted at Hard Rock Stadium in Miami Gardens. 2017 was also the year the festival expanded to other cities with the inaugural editions of Rolling Loud Bay Area and Rolling Loud Southern California.

In 2019 Rolling Loud added Rolling Loud Australia in Sydney, Australia and Rolling Loud NYC to their list of host cities. In the same year, they announced Rolling Loud’s first European festival would take place in Portugal and would be held in July, 2020.

However, the 2020 festival originally scheduled to take place from May 8 to May 10 in the US was rescheduled for July 23 to July 25, 2021, in response to the ongoing COVID-19 pandemic in the United States. The first European edition also had to be rescheduled for 2021 due to similar circumstances in Portugal.

In 2021, Rolling Loud hosted a post-pandemic festival in Miami, with more than 200,000 attendees. The festival included a collaboration with WWE, which broadcast portions of SmackDown from the main stage.

In 2022, Rolling Loud continued to expand to other countries. Rolling Loud's first partnership with a European festival was announced in 2021 as a collaboration with the 2022 edition of WOO HAH! held in Hilvarenbeek, Netherlands from July 1–3, 2022.

After being postponed in 2020 and 2021 due to the COVID-19 pandemic, Rolling Loud Portugal took place on July 6–8, 2022. In Canada, Rolling Loud Toronto took place on September 9–11, 2022. The festival's California edition took place at Inglewood's SoFi Stadium for the first time on March 3–5, 2023. On October 25, 2022, the festival announced its first edition in Thailand, which took place from April 13–15, 2023.

In 2023, after a successful partnership for the production of Woo Hah! 2022 in the Netherlands, Rolling Loud Rotterdam was launched on June 30 – July 1, 2023. A third location of Rolling Loud in Europe was announced to take place in Germany, making its debut in Munich from July 7–9, 2023.

In June 2025, Rolling Loud announced its inaugural edition in India, to be staged as a two-day festival in Mumbai produced in partnership with District by Zomato.

In May 2026, Rolling Loud held its first festival in Orlando, Florida, its only American edition of the year.

== Festival summary by year ==
=== Miami ===
Edition	Year	Dates	Location	Headliners	Ref.
1st	2015	February 28	Soho Studios, Miami	Schoolboy Q; Juicy J; A$AP Ferg	
2nd	2016	May 6–7	Mana Wynwood Production Village, Miami	Future; Young Thug	
3rd	2017	May 5–7	Bayfront Park, Miami	Kendrick Lamar; Future; A$AP Rocky	
4th	2018	May 11–13	Hard Rock Stadium, Miami Gardens	J. Cole; Travis Scott; Future	
5th	2019	May 10–12	Hard Rock Stadium, Miami Gardens	Migos; Travis Scott; Kid Cudi	
Cancelled	2020	May 8–10	Hard Rock Stadium, Miami Gardens	ASAP Rocky; Travis Scott; Post Malone	
6th	2021	July 23–25	Hard Rock Stadium, Miami Gardens	ASAP Rocky; Travis Scott; Post Malone	
7th	2022	July 22–24	Hard Rock Stadium, Miami Gardens	Kanye West (cancelled); Kid Cudi; Future; Kendrick Lamar	
8th	2023	July 21–23	Hard Rock Stadium, Miami Gardens	Playboi Carti; Travis Scott; ASAP Rocky	
9th	2024	December 13–15	Hard Rock Stadium, Miami Gardens	Future; Travis Scott; Playboi Carti	

=== Orlando ===
Edition	Year	Dates	Location	Headliners	Ref.
1st	2026	May 8–10	Camping World Stadium	Don Toliver; Playboi Carti; Ken Carson	

=== California ===
Edition	Year	Dates	Location	Headliners	Ref.
1st (Bay Area)	2017	October 21–22	Shoreline Festival Grounds, Mountain View, California	Travis Scott; Lil Wayne; Schoolboy Q	
1st (Southern)	2017	December 16–17	NOS Events Center, San Bernardino, California	Schoolboy Q; Future	
2nd (Bay Area)	2018	September 15–16	Oakland Coliseum Grounds, Oakland, California	Wiz Khalifa; Rae Sremmurd; Travis Scott	
2nd (Los Angeles)	2018	December 14–15	Banc of California Stadium Grounds and Exposition Park, Los Angeles, California	Post Malone; Lil Wayne; Cardi B; Lil Uzi Vert	
3rd (Bay Area)	2019	September 28–29	Oakland Coliseum Grounds, Oakland, California	Future; G-Eazy; Migos; Lil Uzi Vert	
3rd (Los Angeles)	2019	December 14–15	Banc of California Stadium Grounds and Exposition Park, Los Angeles, California	Chance the Rapper; Lil Uzi Vert; Future; A$AP Rocky	
4th (Southern)	2021	December 10–12	NOS Events Center, San Bernardino, California	J. Cole; Kid Cudi; Future	
5th (Los Angeles)	2023	March 3–5	Hollywood Park Grounds, Inglewood, California	Playboi Carti; Travis Scott; Future	
6th (Los Angeles)	2024	March 14–17	Hollywood Park Grounds, Inglewood, California	¥$; Nicki Minaj; Post Malone; Future & Metro Boomin	
7th (Los Angeles)	2025	March 15–16	Hollywood Park Grounds, Inglewood, California	Playboi Carti; A$AP Rocky; Peso Pluma	

=== New York ===
Edition	Year	Dates	Location	Headliners	Ref.
1st	2019	October 12–13	Citi Field, Queens, New York City	Travis Scott; Meek Mill; Wu-Tang Clan; A$AP Rocky; Lil Uzi Vert	
2nd	2021	October 28–30	Citi Field, Queens, New York City	50 Cent; J. Cole; Travis Scott	
3rd	2022	September 23–25	Citi Field, Queens, New York City	Nicki Minaj; A$AP Rocky; Future	

=== Australia ===
Edition	Year	Dates	Location	Headliners	Ref.
1st	2019	January 27	Sydney Olympic Park, Sydney, Australia	Future; Tyga; Rae Sremmurd	

=== Portugal ===
Edition	Year	Dates	Location	Headliners	Ref.
Cancelled	2020	July 8–10	Praia da Rocha, Portimão, Portugal	A$AP Rocky; Future; Wiz Khalifa	
1st	2022	July 6–8	Praia da Rocha, Portimão, Portugal	J. Cole; A$AP Rocky; Future	
2nd	2023	July 5–7	Praia da Rocha, Portimão, Portugal	Travis Scott; Playboi Carti; Meek Mill	

=== Toronto ===
Edition	Year	Dates	Location	Headliners	Ref.
1st	2022	September 9–11	Ontario Place, Toronto, Canada	Dave; Future; Wizkid	

=== Rotterdam ===
Edition	Year	Dates	Location	Headliners	Ref.
1st	2023	June 30 – July 1	Rotterdam Ahoy, Rotterdam, The Netherlands	Kendrick Lamar; Travis Scott	

=== Germany ===
Edition	Year	Dates	Location	Headliners	Ref.
1st	2023	July 7–9	Neue Messe München, Munich, Germany	Wizkid; Kendrick Lamar; Travis Scott	

=== Thailand ===
Edition	Year	Dates	Location	Headliners	Ref.
1st	2023	April 13–15	Legend Siam, Pattaya, Thailand	Cardi B; Chris Brown; Travis Scott	
2nd	2024	November 22–24	Legend Siam, Pattaya, Thailand	A$AP Rocky; Lil Wayne; Yeat	

=== Austria ===
Edition	Year	Dates	Location	Headliners	Ref.
1st	2024	July 5–7	Magna Racino, Ebreichsdorf, Austria	Nicki Minaj; Travis Scott; Playboi Carti	

=== India ===
Edition	Year	Dates	Location	Headliners	Ref.
1st	2025	22–23 November	Loud Park, Kharghar Navi Mumbai	Central Cee; Wiz Khalifa; Karan Aujla; Don Toliver	
2nd	2026	12-13 December	Loud Park, Kharghar Navi Mumbai	Metro Boomin; Gunna; Karan Aujla; Burna Boy	

== Notable events and incidents at festivals ==
In 2017, Lil Uzi Vert stage-dived into the crowd from a two-story scaffolding at Rolling Loud Miami.

In 2017, at Rolling Loud in Mountain View, California, rapper Lil B was allegedly assaulted by rapper A Boogie wit da Hoodie and his crew. B's performance was cancelled, allegedly due to his equipment having been stolen by the assailants.

In 2018, at Rolling Loud in Miami, Meek Mill made his second live performance after being released from prison with a surprise set at the festival.

In 2018, Offset publicly apologized to Cardi B on Stage during her headlining set at Rolling Loud Los Angeles.

XXXTentacion had his last ever live performance at Rolling Loud Miami just a month before his death.

In 2018, Young Dolph flew out Duke University Baristas who were fired for playing his music and gifted them $20,000 on stage at Rolling Loud Miami.

NPR described Rolling Loud as a "hotbed for arrests", and according to The New York Times, "Rolling Loud events have been connected to arrests and violence in the past." The 2019 edition of the Miami festival has been described as "plagued by chaos".

In 2019, at Rolling Loud in Los Angeles, a 23-year-old attendee named Kalvin Sanchez was assaulted and rushed to the hospital after suffering serious head injuries. He died four days later; his death was deemed a homicide.

In 2021, before entering the festival grounds of Rolling Loud New York, rapper Fetty Wap was arrested on federal drug charges at New York’s Citi Field for conspiracy to distribute hard drugs such as heroin, cocaine and fentanyl.

In 2022, rapper Travis Scott came out for Future’s headliner set at Rolling Loud Miami. In 2022, Travis Scott was sued for allegedly causing a stampede during his performance at Rolling Loud in Miami three years prior, in 2019. The lawsuit claimed that Scott was being negligent by encouraging the crowd to become more aggressive while people were "being injured, suffocating, losing consciousness, fighting and being trampled".

In July 2022, during the first day of Rolling Loud in Miami, multiple objects were thrown at rapper and singer Kid Cudi from the crowd during his set, including a water bottle thrown at his face. In response, Cudi gave the crowd an ultimatum to curtail its unruly behavior, but after another object was thrown at him, he cut off his performance and left the stage. (Shortly after Cudi's set ended, rapper Lil Durk began his set and brought out Kanye West to perform their single "Hot Shit". Ironically, West had previously left the festival lineup after being scheduled to perform, and had been replaced by Cudi.)

In 2022, Lil Tjay returned to the stage for Rolling Loud NY after being shot In June. The Rolling Loud appearance was the rapper's first gig since being shot seven times.

In 2022, Nicki Minaj became the first solo female rapper to headline Rolling Loud at Rolling Loud New York.

In 2023, Don Toliver brought out surprise guests Kali Uchis, James Blake, and Justin Bieber during his set at Rolling Loud California. This was Justin Bieber’s first performance since the cancellation of his Justice World Tour.

== Other events ==
In 2020, virtual live performances called “Loud Streams” were streamed on Twitch. The first event was held on September 12–13, and the second on October 30–31. In 2021, archived performances from the Miami and Bay Area festivals from 2017 were streamed on the festival's official YouTube channel. Each festival is annually livestreamed. Usually simulcast on the YouTube and Twitch channels, however Revolt broadcast it in 2017, LiveXLive in 2018, and Be At TV in 2019. Rolling Loud presented a two night showcase at the Stubb's Bar-B-Q venue during South by Southwest in Austin, Texas in 2022.

Outside of festivals, Rolling Loud also promotes and sponsors several concert tours.

On December 9, 2022, Rolling Loud released its first single titled "Finger Food" featuring Rae Sremmurd and Duke Deuce.

== Philanthropy ==
In 2021, the Black Music Action Coalition and Rolling Loud partnered for Social Justice Initiatives. The collaboration highlighted activism and community through panel discussions and fundraising efforts throughout the three-days of Rolling Loud California.

In 2021, rapper Zoey Dollaz and Rolling Loud Co-Founder, Tariq Cherif, chartered several jets to Haiti to provide supplies to people in the wake of a massive earthquake.

In 2022, The Miami Jr. HEAT teamed up with Rolling Loud to host 50 local children from After-School All-Stars for a basketball clinic at the festival.

In 2023, Rolling Loud partnered with DGK to host a skateboard giveback on the grounds of SoFi Stadium. Rolling Loud Co-Founder, Tariq Cherif, Inglewood city officials, and professional skateboarder Don Cooley, gifted 40 students from Kelso Elementary with DGK skateboards and helmets.

In 2023, Rolling Loud teamed up with the City of Miami Gardens and Rick Ross to gift eight students with scholarships to graduating high school seniors from Miami Norland and Miami Carol City Senior High Schools.

In 2023, Rolling Loud hosted a panel discussion with the Black Music Action Coalition (BMAC) in support of their Restoring Artistic Protections (RAP) Act initiative on the first day of Rolling Loud Miami. The panel included Rolling Loud co-Founder Tariq Cherif, BMAC co-founder and chair Willie “Prophet” Stiggers, Congressman Hank Johnson, and Congressman Jamaal Bowman. The act was introduced as a way to protect artists' creative expression, which has been used against them as evidence in court.

== Awards ==
In 2024, Rolling Loud won the Silver ANA SeeHer REGGIE GEM Award for their Forever 21 x Bunny's Bae Bar collaboration.

In 2024, Rolling Loud won the Silver Influencer Marketing Award for their work with the Forever21 x Bunny Bae’s Bar collaboration.
