= Gmina Ślemień =

Gmina Ślemień Ślemień Commune
- Gmina
- Coat of arms

- Coordinates (Ślemień): 49°43′N 19°23′E
- Country: Poland
- Voivodeship: Silesian
- County: Żywiec
- Seat: Ślemień

Area
  - Total: 45.87 km^{2} (17.71 sq mi)

Population (2019-06-30)
  - Total: 3,526
  - Density: 76.87/km^{2} (199.1/sq mi)
- Website: http://www.slemien.pl

Gmina Ślemień is a rural gmina (administrative district) in Żywiec County, Silesian Voivodeship, in southern Poland. Its seat is the village of Ślemień, which lies approximately 14 kilometres (9 mi) east of Żywiec and 66 km (41 mi) south-east of the regional capital Katowice. The gmina also contains the villages (sołectwos) of Kocoń and Las.

The gmina covers an area of 45.87 square kilometres (17.7 sq mi), and as of 2019 its total population is 3,526.

== Neighbouring gminas ==
Gmina Ślemień is bordered by the gminas of Andrychów, Gilowice, Łękawica, Stryszawa and Świnna.
