= 2005 Świnna rail crash =

Runaway train event in Poland in 2005

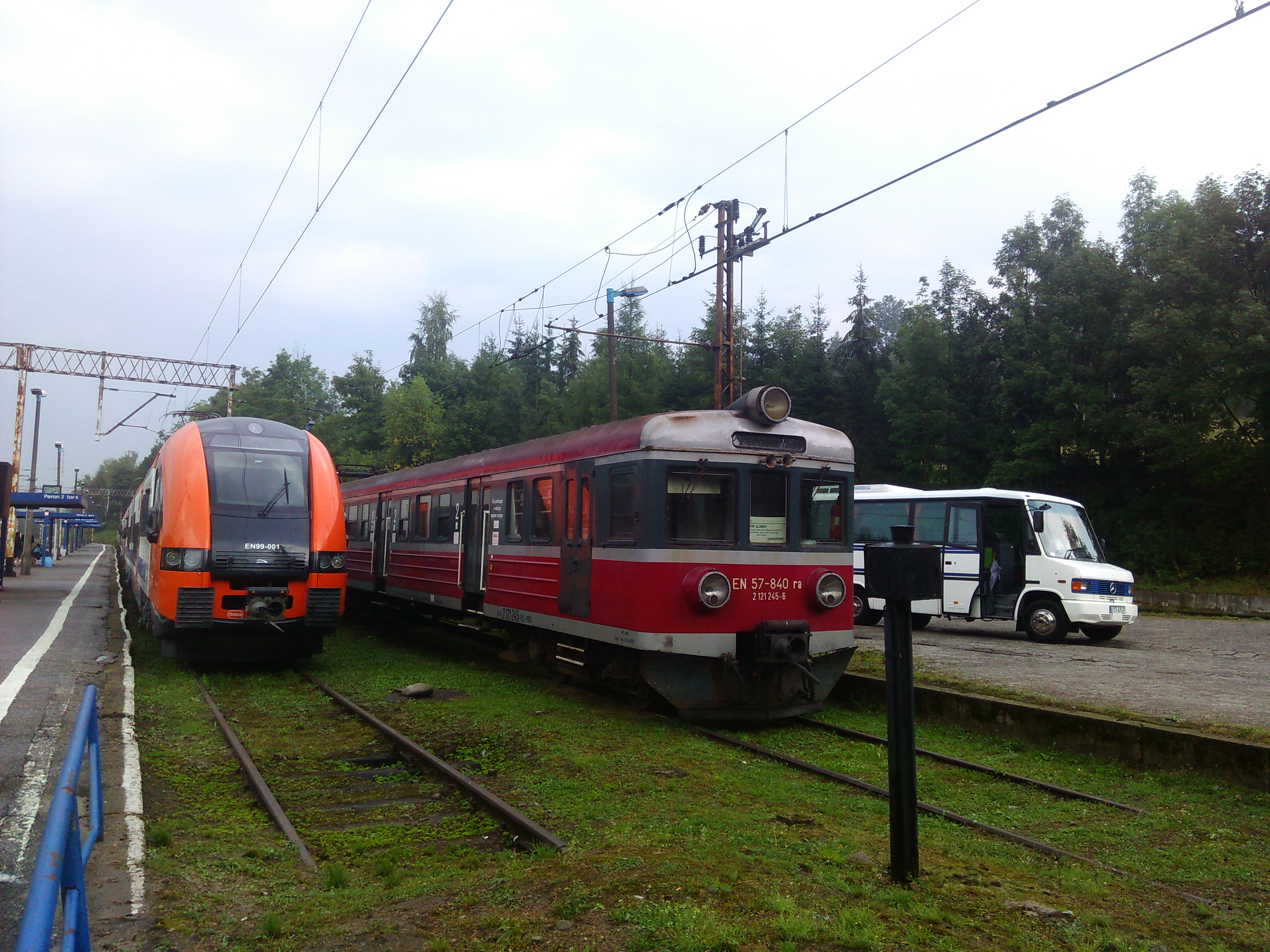
- EN57-840 involved in the accident, at Zakopane railway station in 2015, 10 years after the crash

Details
- Date: 19 December 2005; 14:30 to 15:00 local time
- Location: Świnna, Silesian Voivodeship
- Coordinates: 49°40′12″N 19°14′57″E
- Country: Poland
- Line: Skawina-Żywiec, section Hucisko – Żywiec Sporysz
- Operator: PKP Przewozy Regionalne
- Incident type: Runaway train, controlled collision
- Cause: Brake failure due to manufacturing error

Statistics
- Trains: Os 34527 Sucha Beskidzka – Żywiec; Os 43524 Żywiec – Sucha Beskidzka
- Passengers: 30
- Crew: 4
- Deaths: 0
- Injured: 8

The Świnna rail crash, also known as Jeleśnia runaway train, was a runaway train accident involving two passenger trains on Skawina – Żywiec railway line 97 in Poland on 19 December 2005. The brakes in a passenger train running from Sucha Beskidzka to Żywiec stopped operating after it entered the steep sloped section of line, reaching speed of 90 km/h and creating the threat of head-on collision with another passenger train, going in opposite direction from Żywiec to Sucha Beskidzka. Due to the coordinated efforts of the train dispatcher at Jeleśnia station and the crew of both trains, the trains eventually collided in a controlled manner in Świnna, Silesian Voivodeship, just outside Żywiec. 2 members of the train crews and 6 passengers were injured.

== Trains involved ==
Two passenger trains were involved in the accident. The first one was 34527 from Sucha Beskidzka to Żywiec, operated by EN57-840 EMU; the crew members were Czesław Gołuszka (driver) and Lucyna Kubieniec (conductor). The second one was 43524 from Żywiec to Sucha Beskidzka, operated by EN57-1271 EMU; the crew consisted of driver Ryszard Budziak and conductor Maciej Polak. There were at least 30 passengers aboard both trains.

== Accident ==
At 14:00, train 34527 departed Sucha Beskidzka. 33 minutes later, train 43524 left Żywiec. As the railway line from Skawina to Żywiec is single track, the trains were scheduled to cross at Jeleśnia railway station, halfway between Sucha and Żywiec, at 14:58.

However, at 14:38, when 34527 approached Hucisko stop (the highest point on the line, located at 550 meters above sea level), Gołuszka realized that his train had problems with braking. After the train left Hucisko and entered the steep sloped section of the line (Jeleśnia station is located lower than Hucisko, at 425 meters above sea level), both main brake and handbrake stopped reacting. Gołuszka completely lost control over EN57-840, which started accelerating above the speed limit of 40 km/h.

External videos
- CCTV video from railway crossing in Pewel Wielka, with EN57-840 coming down to Jeleśnia without brakes

After every attempt to stop the train failed, Kubieniec moved all passengers to the last car. When 34527 passed through Pewel Wielka, at 14:45 Gołuszka radioed the train dispatcher in Jeleśnia station, Danuta Gancarz, to inform about the danger and call for help.

Jeleśnia, zróbcie coś, stawcie przelot, bo nie mam hamowania
Jeleśnia, do something, set the junctions, I've got no brakes

— Czesław Gołuszka informs Jeleśnia train dispatcher Danuta Gancarz about the situation at 14:45

The railway rules of Polish law, along with PKP Polskie Linie Kolejowe internal regulations, state that runaway carriages, if possible, have to be directed onto a dead-end track, or else derailed in any possible way. Moreover, it is generally prohibited to direct runaway carriages towards tracks occupied by carriages with people. However, those regulations do not define or even mention the situation where a runaway train occurs. Runaway train is an EN57, an Electric multiple unit, passenger train, which does not fit into a definition of "runaway carriages" mentioned by rules.

Danuta Gancarz decided to do as Gołuszka requested – she set the junctions at the station so 34527 could pass through – and radioed the driver of 43524 train to Sucha Beskidzka, Ryszard Budziak, ordering him to stop and reverse immediately because a runaway train was coming at him. Budziak did so, additionally sending the conductor Maciej Polak to the cab used in direction of Sucha so he could inform him about the distance between the trains.

The train 34527 passed through Jeleśnia railway station with speed of 90 km/h. Minutes later, Polak, still standing in the rear cab of 43524, saw the approaching EN57-840. He relayed the distance between both trains to Budziak, who managed to speed up the train to 70 km/h. When the distance decreased to 30 meters, Polak retreated into the passenger compartment after radioing it, while Budziak engaged the brakes of EN57-1271 in order to stop both trains before a railway bridge in Żywiec.

When both EMUs collided, EN57-840 was travelling at 85 km/h, while EN57-1241 speed was 65 km/h. The trains stopped after travelling further 300 meters.

Both drivers – Budziak and Gołuszka – and six passengers were injured, but there were no fatalities. There was also damage to both EMUs and track.

== Causes ==
The investigation determined that the cause was icing on composite brake blocks, with bad weather and temperature below zero as additional factors. This was confirmed by a control drive with similar EN57 EMU on 28 December, 9 days after the accident. The final conclusion was that the composite brake blocks made of FR502 material used in EN57 EMUs in Poland were dangerous to the safety of Polish railways.

=== Composite brake blocks ===
The brakes in EN57 EMUs consist of two parts: the brake block and its holder (obsada). The brake blocks are made of cast iron or composites; in contrast to the former, composite ones are cheaper, more durable and emit less sounds during braking. EN57-840, which operated as 34527 train on 19 December 2005, was equipped with composite brake blocks of LL type (of low friction coefficient) made by Frenoplast company from composite material marked FR502.

The issues with FR502 composite brake blocks were noted in 2004, after their introduction. In his interpelation to Ministry of Infrastructure, Stanisław Żelichowski noted that in the train driver's opinion, the composite brake blocks lowered the effectiveness of braking, emitted smoke during braking, and caused wheel locking. The low effectiveness of FR502-made brake blocks at low speeds and low overall effectiveness of handbrake was also noted in Polish Railway Drivers' Union journal, Głos Maszynisty, 4 days before the accident.

The CEO of Frenoplast, Bohdan Bułhak, stated in February 2006 during an interview, that the composite brake blocks in 2001 have obtained a positive opinion of the Tabor Railway Vehicle Institute in Poznań (rolling stock institute in Poznań), and rolling stock department of Silesian University of Technology had conducted an EMU brake performance test after which concluded that the brake performance at maximum speed is similar to EMU using cast iron blocks. In the years 2002–2003, there were performed tests in the Mazowieckie and Beskidy mountains area, that led to obtaining a prolongation of "Świadectwo dopuszczenia do eksploatacji" safety certificate (allowing brake pads operation) issued by Urząd Transportu Kolejowego (Polish Office of Rail Transport). CEO stated, that allegations made by train drivers are unjustified. In the reporter's conducting the interview opinion, for the CEO the whole case is "thinly disguised". He comments on composite brake pads operation susped decisions arguing and bringing up lack of train driver's driving technique, profit loss of rival companies (foundries) while Frenoplast is the sole composite brake pads producer in Poland, and finally – 2 January 2002 incident between the Dulowa and Krzeszowice stations, where during the similar incident the icing of iron cast brake pads had happened. "The decision made in relation to Frenoplast (...) begins to take on a new meaning, and the answear to question: is this fuss about train drivers and passengers safety? is not unambiguous.", he summarizes.

== Aftermath ==
On 23 January 2006, PKP Przewozy Regionalne retired all composite brake blocks made of FR502 material. This was followed by two Office of Rail Transport decisions: first on 31 January, which cancelled the certificate issued for FR502-made brake blocks, and second on 2 February 2006, ordering all operators to retire FR502-made brake blocks before 1 April.

Both train crews and train dispatcher from Jeleśnia received Medals for Sacrifice and Courage from President of Poland Lech Kaczyński in 2006.
