= Raymond Smith =

Raymond Smith may refer to:

- Raymond Smith (South African cricketer) (1923–1984), South African cricketer
- Raymond M. Smith (1924–1988), Canadian politician
- Raymond J. Smith (1930–2008), American editor
- Raymond Smith (English cricketer) (1935–2001), English cricketer
- Raymond C. Smith (1943–2022), United States Navy rear admiral and SEAL commander
- Raymond Smith (dancer), Canadian ballet dancer and teacher
- Raymond Smith Jr. (born 1961), member-elect of the United States House of Representatives
- Raymond Smith (darts player) (born 1979), Australian darts player

== See also ==
- Ray Smith (disambiguation)
