= Las, Silesian Voivodeship =

Las
- Village
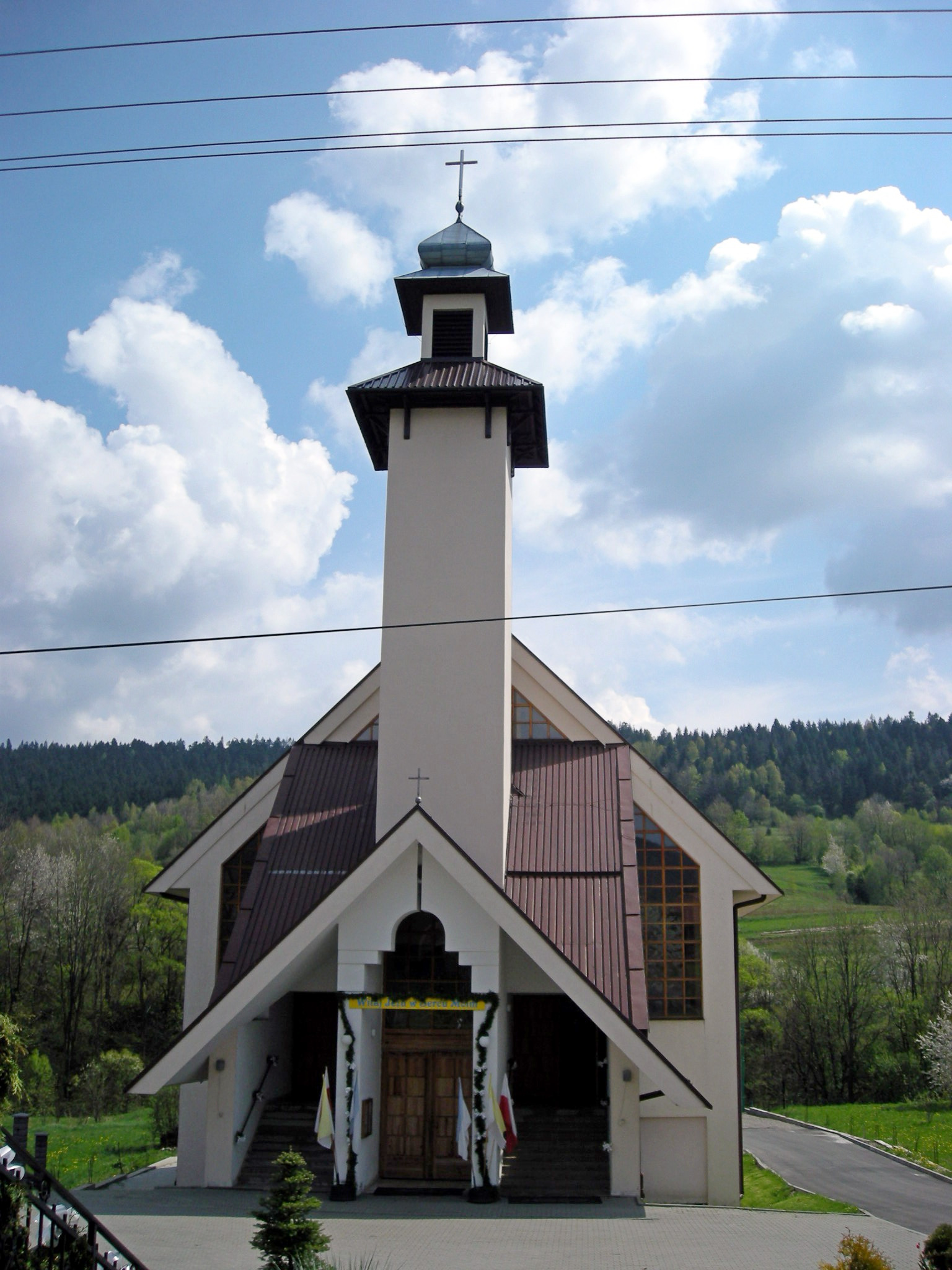
- A church in Las

- Location within Poland
- Coordinates: 49°44′N 19°25′E
- Country: Poland
- Voivodeship: Silesian
- County: Żywiec
- Gmina: Ślemień
- Population: 776

Las [las] is a village in the administrative district of Gmina Ślemień, within Żywiec County, Silesian Voivodeship, in southern Poland.
