= Brzezinka, Gmina Andrychów =

Brzezinka
- Village
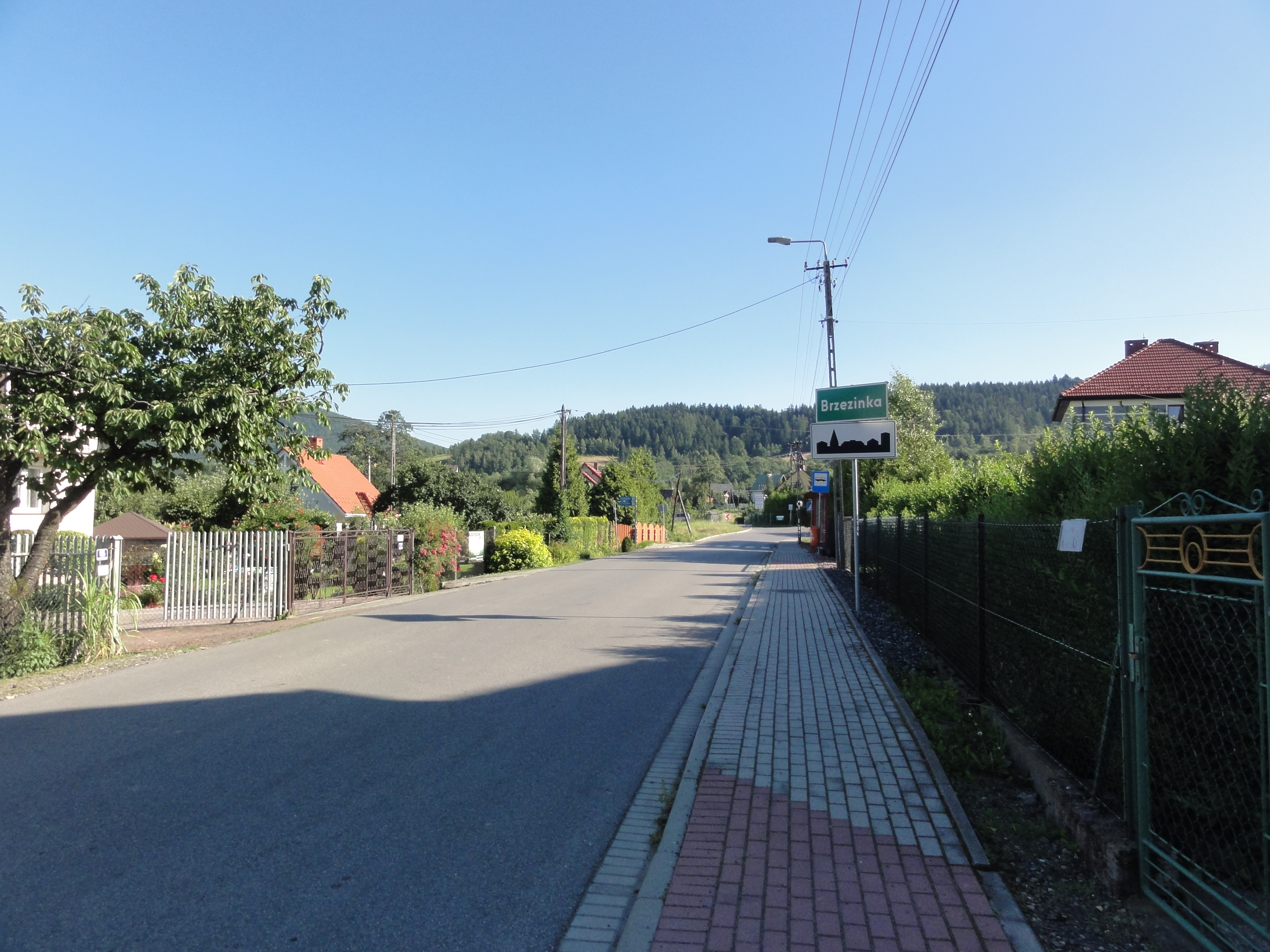

- Location within Poland
- Coordinates: 49°49′41″N 19°18′55″E
- Country: Poland
- Voivodeship: Lesser Poland
- County: Wadowice
- Gmina: Andrychów
- Population: 727
- Time zone: UTC+1 (CET)
  - Summer (DST): UTC+2 (CEST)
- Vehicle registration: KWA

Brzezinka (Polish pronunciation: [bʐɛˈʑiŋka]) is a village in the administrative district of Gmina Andrychów, within Wadowice County, Lesser Poland Voivodeship, in southern Poland.

== History ==
During the German occupation of Poland (World War II), in 1942, the German gendarmerie carried out expulsions of Poles, whose houses and farms were then handed over to German colonists as part of the Lebensraum policy. Expelled Poles were enslaved as forced labour of new German colonists.
