= Be At TV =

BE-AT.TV
- Industry: Music & Entertainment
- Founded: 2008
- Founder: Ray Smith
- Headquarters: London, UK
- Key people: Ray Smith (CEO)
- Website: www.be-at.tv

BE-AT.TV is an online global community connecting clubbers and electronic music fans with big-name DJs, venues and festivals.

== History ==
BE-AT.TV was launched in 2008 by Ray Smith and is also known as B@ TV and Be At TV. BE-AT.TV is headquartered in London, UK, and has offices in Ibiza, Berlin, and New York and regularly films events across Europe and North America, with multiple crews based in Ibiza every summer.

== Content and features ==
BE-AT.TV primarily broadcasts sets by techno and house artists, as well as other genres across the electronic music spectrum. Festivals include Tomorrowland, Ultra Music Festival, Winter Music Conference, Amsterdam Dance Event, The BPM Festival, Awakenings, Time Warp, KaZantip, EXIT Festival, Nature One, Mayday, Creamfields, Movement Detroit, Movement Torino, GlobalGathering, Bestival, and many more. Venues include Space Ibiza, Amnesia Ibiza, Ushuaïa Ibiza, Pacha Ibiza, Ministry of Sound in London, Club Space in Miami, and many more.

BE-AT.TV broadcasts consist of high definition, full-length video and audio footage which is shot from multiple camera angles, including exclusive camera access from the DJ booth. The sets are then archived for members to watch on-demand, and can be accessed through any computer or iOS device with a high speed internet connection.

The website combines aspects of social networking, web-based radio and music television. Members can chat with each other during live streams and suggest / share track IDs.

The site's content is free to its users.

== Industry support and growth ==
BE-AT.TV is supported by acts including Pete Tong, Sander Kleinenberg, deadmau5, Sander van Doorn, Dubfire, Tom Middleton, Ferry Corsten, Chicane (recording artist), Benny Benassi, Dave Spoon, Mark Knight, Tiefschwarz and Groove Armada. It is also supported by festivals and venues as mentioned above.

It was selected as a Top 100 website of 2009 by PC Magazine and has received attention from press, trend spotters and bloggers.

It has also appeared in national media outlets Times Online, The Guardian and electronic dance music publication DJ Magazine.

"Since 2009, London-based BE-AT.TV streams live video from the best dance and electronic music events around the world, showcasing an eclectic range of artists, venues and promoters to a global online audience." - DJ Mag

== Acquisitions and Investments ==
In June 2015, BE-AT.TV announced the acquisition of Ibiza Sonica Radio, one of the leading electronic music radio stations based on the Balearic Island of Ibiza. The two companies commemorated the acquisition by throwing a free party in the port of Ibiza which featured Nic Fanciulli, Matthias Tanzmann, Guy Gerber, and many more artists.

In September 2015, BE-AT.TV announced an investment in and partnership with Ibiza Global Radio, another of the leading electronic music radio stations based on Ibiza. BE-AT.TV and Ibiza Global Radio threw a combined free party on Talamanca Beach to celebrate the partnership.
