= Kocoń =

- Village
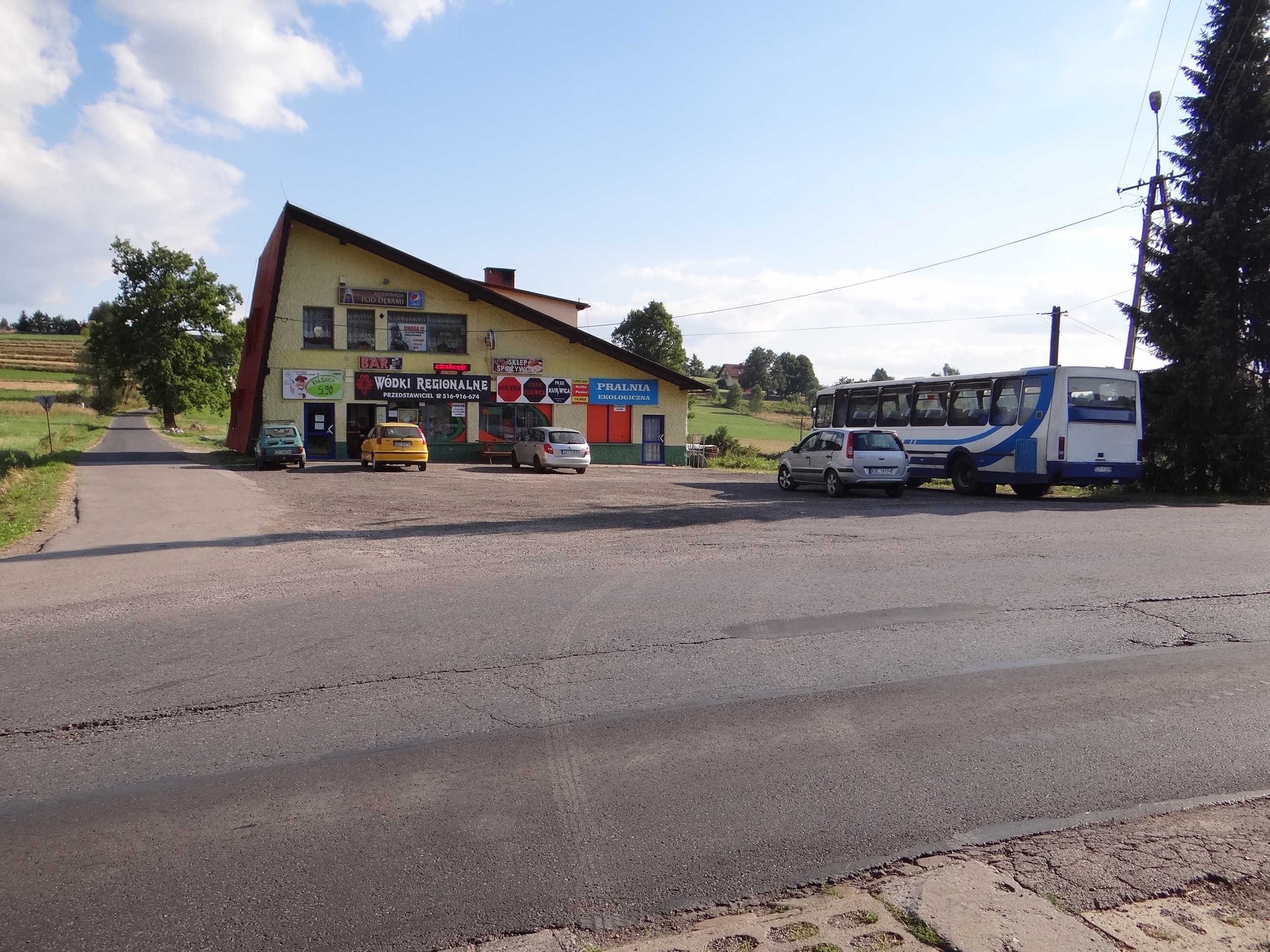

- Location within Poland
- Coordinates: 49°43′N 19°23′E
- Country: Poland
- Voivodeship: Silesian
- County: Żywiec
- Gmina: Ślemień
- Population: 702

Kocoń [ˈkɔt͡sɔɲ] is a village in the administrative district of Gmina Ślemień, within Żywiec County, Silesian Voivodeship, in southern Poland.
