= Bernard Friedberg =

Austrian Hebraist

Bernard Friedberg (Hebrew: ברנרד פרידברג) was an Austrian Hebraist, scholar and bibliographer.

Friedberg was born in Kraków on December 19, 1876. He moved to Frankfurt in 1900; initially he worked for publisher Isaac Kauffmann and later set up his own firm. During The Holocaust his library was destroyed and his daughter and son were killed along with her husband and two daughters. Friedberg escaped to Vittel, France and later went to Mandatory Palestine. He died on January 27, 1961. Friedberg published some of his work.
