= Sułkowice, Wadowice County =

Sułkowice
- Village
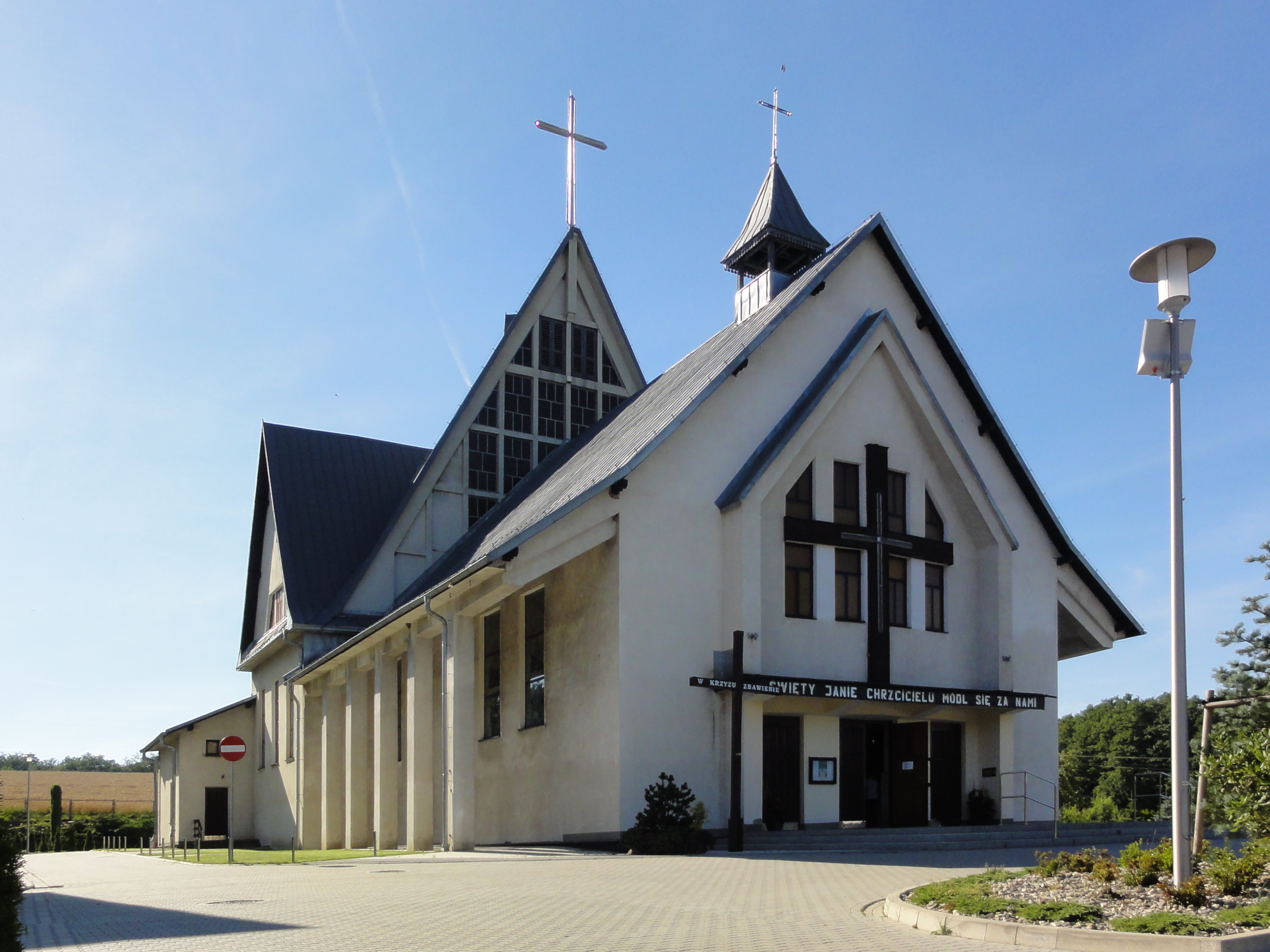
- Saint John the Baptist church

- Location within Poland
- Coordinates: 49°49′34″N 19°21′33″E
- Country: Poland
- Voivodeship: Lesser Poland
- County: Wadowice
- Gmina: Andrychów
- Population: 4,835

Sułkowice [suu̯kɔˈvʲit͡sɛ] is a village in the administrative district of Gmina Andrychów, within Wadowice County, Lesser Poland Voivodeship, in southern Poland.
