= Ślemień =

- Village
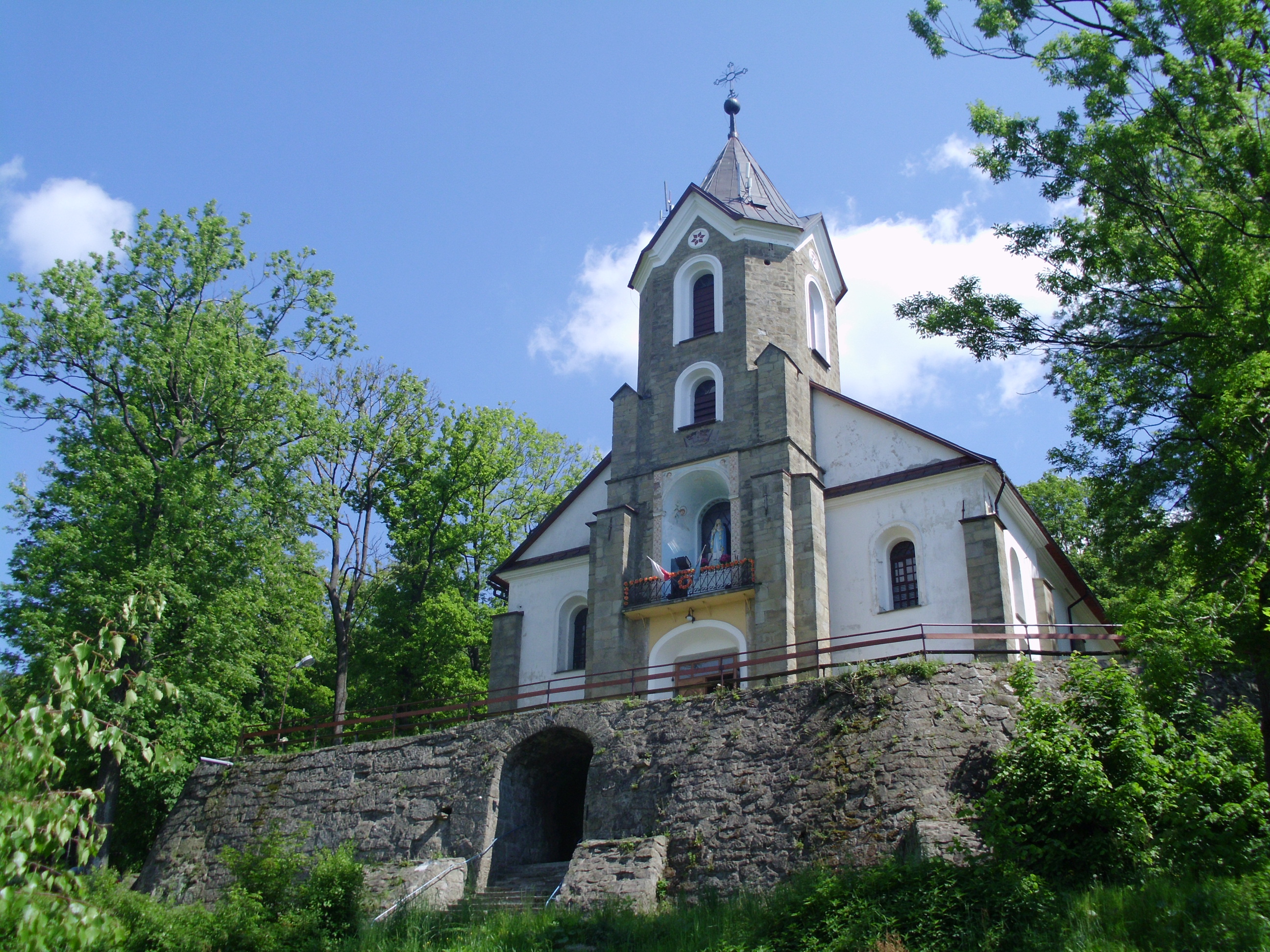
- Jasna Górka sanctuary

- Location within Poland
- Coordinates: 49°43′N 19°21′E
- Country: Poland
- Voivodeship: Silesian
- County: Żywiec
- Gmina: Ślemień
- Population: 1,977 (2,013)
- Website: https://web.archive.org/web/20080103102042/http://www.slemien.pl/

Ślemień [ˈɕlɛmjɛɲ] is a village in Żywiec County, Silesian Voivodeship, in a mountainous part of southern Poland. It is the seat of the gmina (administrative district) called Gmina Ślemień.
