= Targanice =

- Village
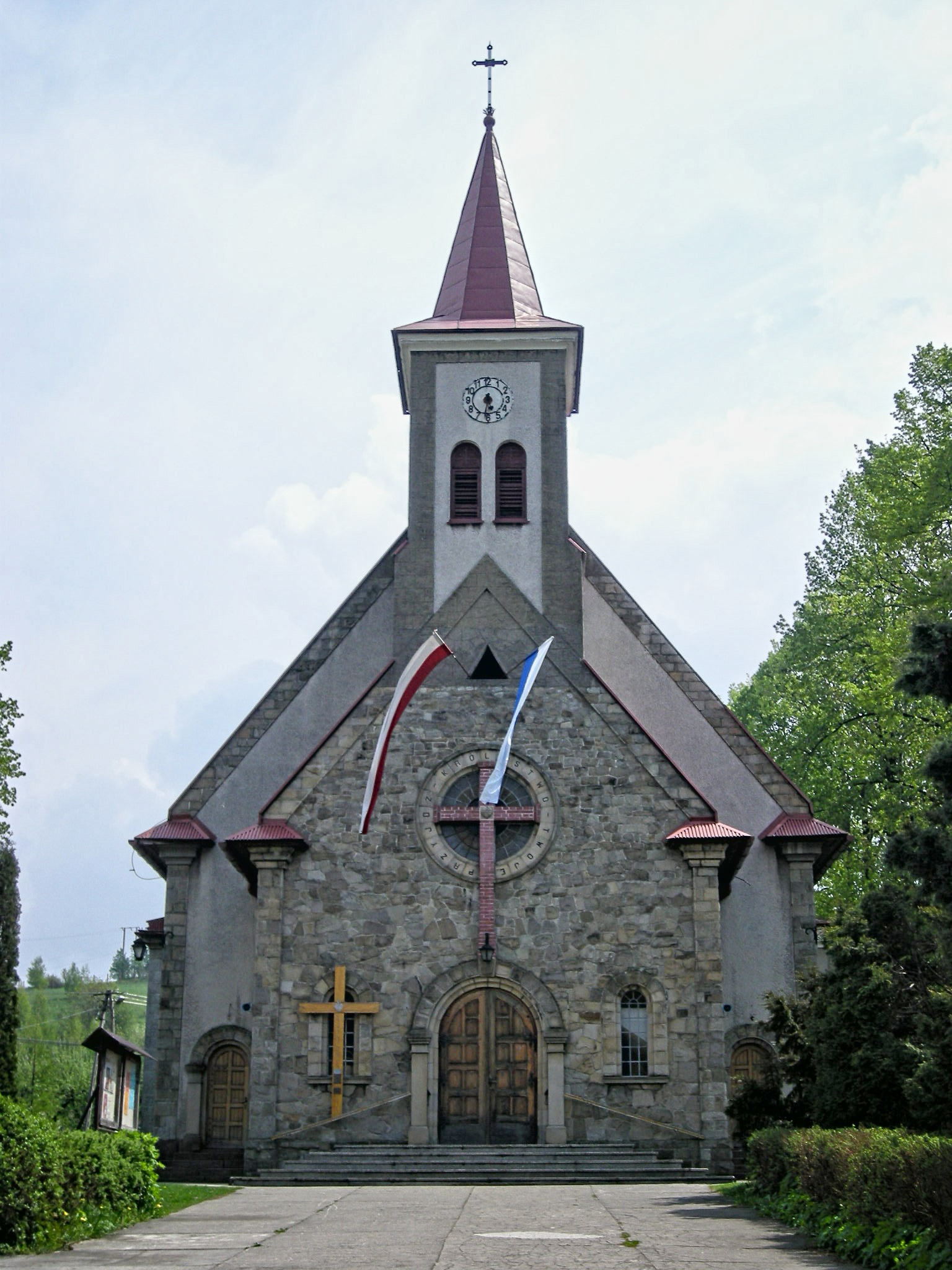
- A local Catholic church

- Location within Poland
- Coordinates: 49°49′N 19°19′E
- Country: Poland
- Voivodeship: Lesser Poland
- County: Wadowice
- Gmina: Andrychów
- Population: 3,860

Targanice [tarɡaˈɲit͡sɛ] is a village in the administrative district of Gmina Andrychów, within Wadowice County, Lesser Poland Voivodeship, in southern Poland.
