= Fresku =

Dutch rapper, comedian and actor

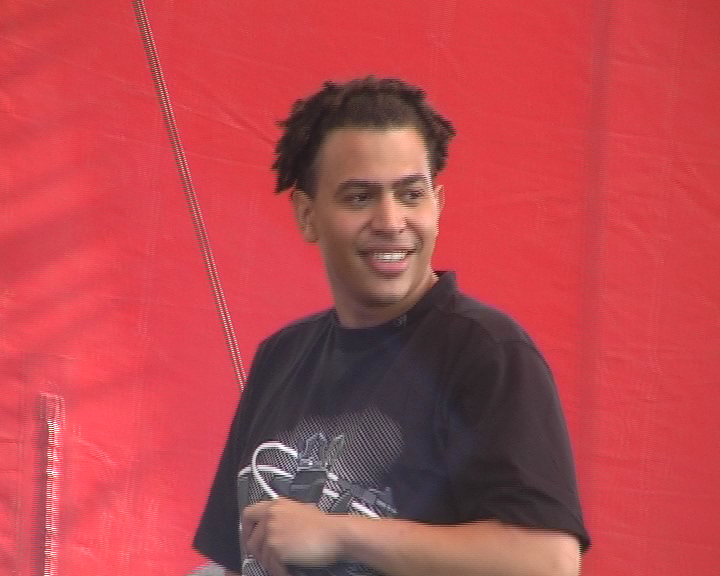
- Fresku in 2009

Background information
- Also known as: Fresku, Gino Pietermaai, Willy Keurig
- Born: Roy Michael Reymound; October 26, 1986 (age 39); Eindhoven, Netherlands
- Genre: Hip hop
- Occupations: Rapper; comedian; actor
- Instrument: Vocals
- Years active: 2006–present
- Label: TopNotch

Roy Michael Reymound (born October 26, 1986), known professionally as Fresku, is a Dutch rapper, actor and comedian.

== Biography ==
Reymound was born on 26 October 1986 in Eindhoven to a Dutch mother and a Curaçaoan father. At the age of fourteen, he started rapping and gave himself the rap name "Fresku", which is Papiamento for 'cheeky'. He first wrote in English because he thought the Dutch language did not fit well with rap. However, he was inspired by the Dutch rap group Opgezwolle to start writing in Dutch. He also started collaborating with producer and film maker Teemong and made short films and sketches on the internet. In May 2008, they made the short film De Oude Bok, which was the debut of Fresku's populair character "Gino Pietermaai", a dim-witted 'stereotypical Curaçaoan' who is involved in rapping and mischief.

At the end of 2008, Fresku made a track called Brief aan Kees ("Letter to Kees"), which is a 'musical open letter' addressed to Kees de Koning, owner of record label TopNotch. De Koning was impressed by Fresku's talent and contacted the rapper within 24 hours of the song appearing online.

In March 2009, Fresku released the song Twijfel ("Doubt"). In the song he focuses on all his doubts and the fact that he had become more famous with the character Gino Pietermaai than the rapper Fresku. In April 2009 he was signed by TopNotch. During the State Awards 2009, Fresku was voted "Rookie of the Year" and his song Twijfel was voted "best single".

In April 2010, Fresku released his self-titled debut album Fresku on TopNotch. On the album he focuses on the problems surrounding Dutch-Antillean people, but also the lightness and humor of Gino Pietermaai came along. At the end of 2010, he also made his film debut by playing a small role as a garbage man in the Dutch film New Kids Turbo.

== Discography ==
Studio albums

- Fresku (2010)
- Maskerade (2012)
- Nooit Meer Terug (2015)
- In Het Diepe (2019)
- In de Lucht (Deel 1) (2021)
- Leren Leven (2024)
