= Ray Smith (businessman) =

Ray Smith is an American businessman, who founded BE-AT.TV in 2009.

== Early life and education ==
Smith was born and raised in Drexel Hill, Pennsylvania, before moving to Southern California. He graduated cum laude from the University of Southern California.

== Early career ==
Smith's past experience includes R.B. Webber, a leading Palo Alto–based strategy consulting firm, and the Unlisted Group, where, as Principal, he focused on converging and monetizing new technology and content creation.

== BE-AT.TV ==
Ray Smith founded BE-AT.TV, an information and networking website for dance music events, in 2009.
