= Zagórnik, Lesser Poland Voivodeship =

Zagórnik
- Village
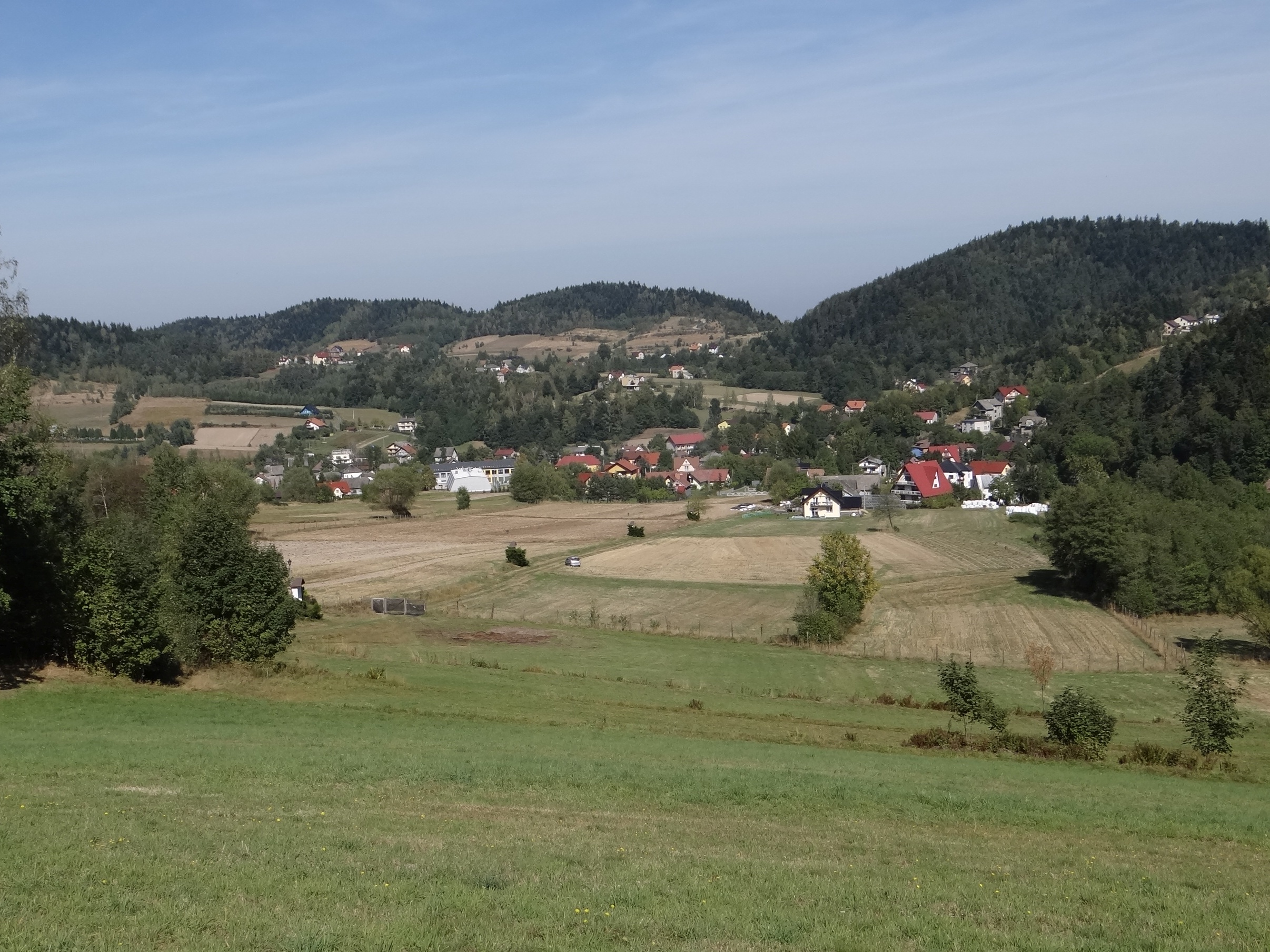

- Location within Poland
- Coordinates: 49°50′12″N 19°22′33″E
- Country: Poland
- Voivodeship: Lesser Poland
- County: Wadowice
- Gmina: Andrychów
- Population: 2,119

Zagórnik [zaˈɡurɲik] is a village in the administrative district of Gmina Andrychów, within Wadowice County, Lesser Poland Voivodeship, in southern Poland.
