= Braz =

Braz or Bráz may refer to:

- Adam Braz (born 1981), Canadian soccer player and Technical Director of the Montreal Impact of Major League Soccer
- David Braz (born 1987), Brazilian footballer
- Bráz (João Francisco Bráz) (1920–1996), Brazilian basketball player
- João Braz de Aviz (born 1947), Brazilian cardinal
- Loalwa Braz (1953–2017), Brazilian singer and songwriter
- Osip Braz (1873–1936), Russian-Jewish realist painter
- Thiago Braz (born 1993), Brazilian pole vaulter
