= Świnna, Silesian Voivodeship =

Świnna
- Village
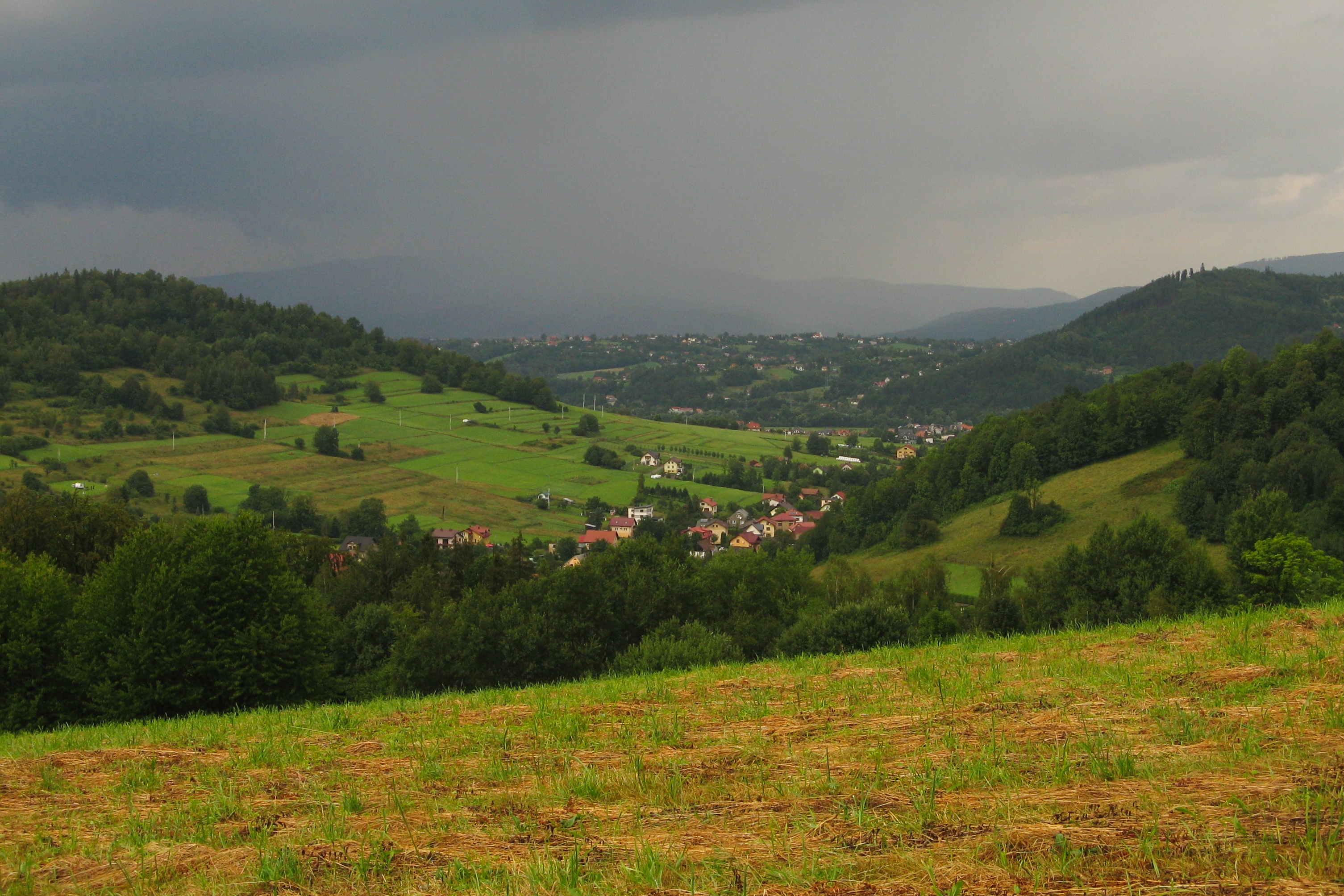
- Świnna and Żywiec in 2020

- Location within Poland
- Coordinates: 49°39′N 19°15′E
- Country: Poland
- Voivodeship: Silesian
- County: Żywiec
- Gmina: Świnna
- Population: 1,891

Świnna [ˈɕfinna] is a village in Żywiec County, Silesian Voivodeship, in southern Poland. It is the seat of the gmina (administrative district) called Gmina Świnna.

== History ==
Following the 1939 Invasion of Poland, which started World War II, Świnna was occupied by Nazi Germany and annexed to the German Province of Upper Silesia. The Red Army captured the village on 5 February 1945, ending the Nazi occupation.
