= Pewel Ślemieńska =

- Village
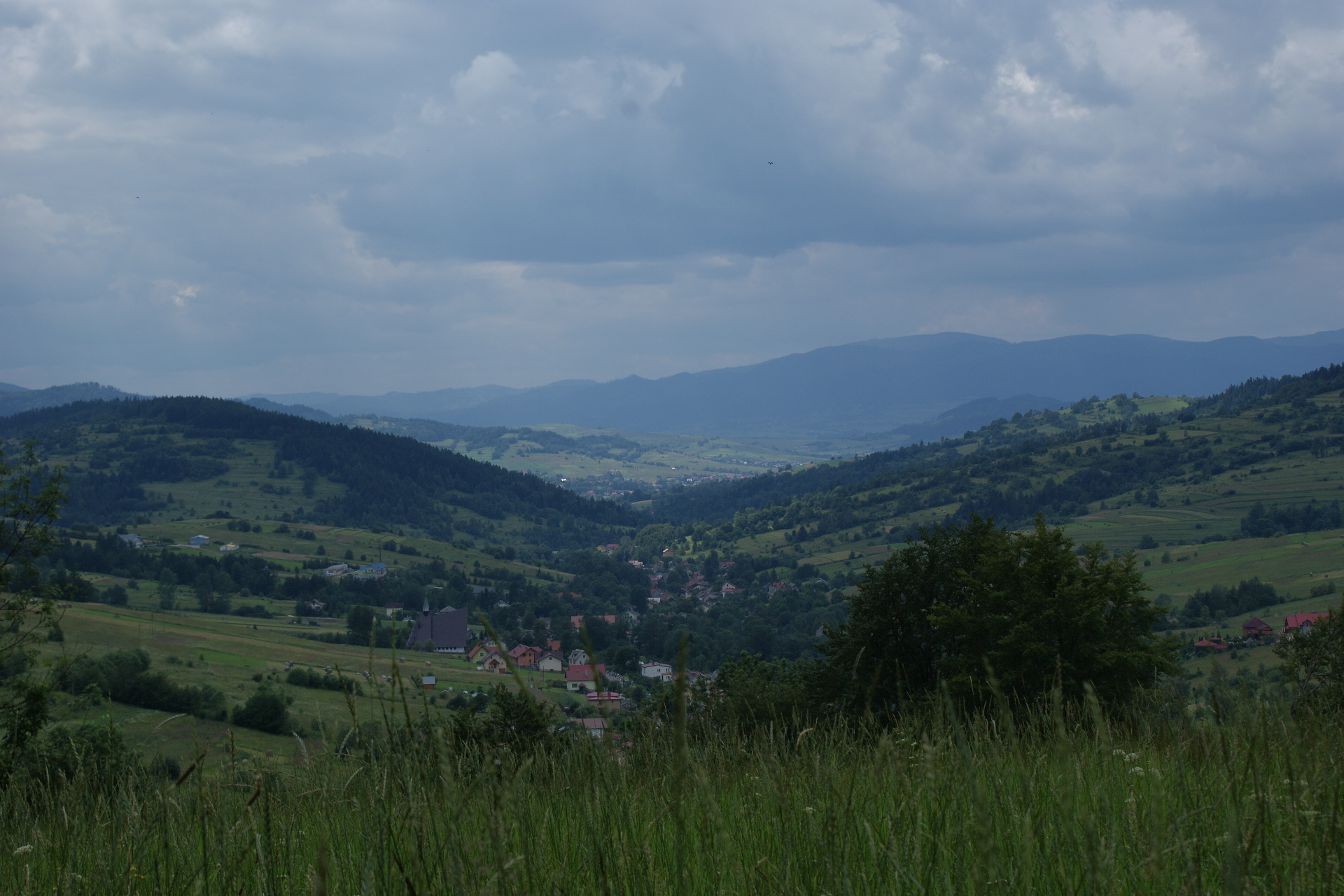
- General view

- Location within Poland
- Coordinates: 49°40′58″N 19°18′57″E
- Country: Poland
- Voivodeship: Silesian
- County: Żywiec
- Gmina: Świnna
- Population: 1,555

Pewel Ślemieńska [ˈpɛvɛl ɕlɛˈmjɛɲska] is a village in the administrative district of Gmina Świnna, within Żywiec County, Silesian Voivodeship, in southern Poland.

== See also ==
- Pewel Mała, Pewel Wielka, Pewelka
