= Rychwałdek =

- Village
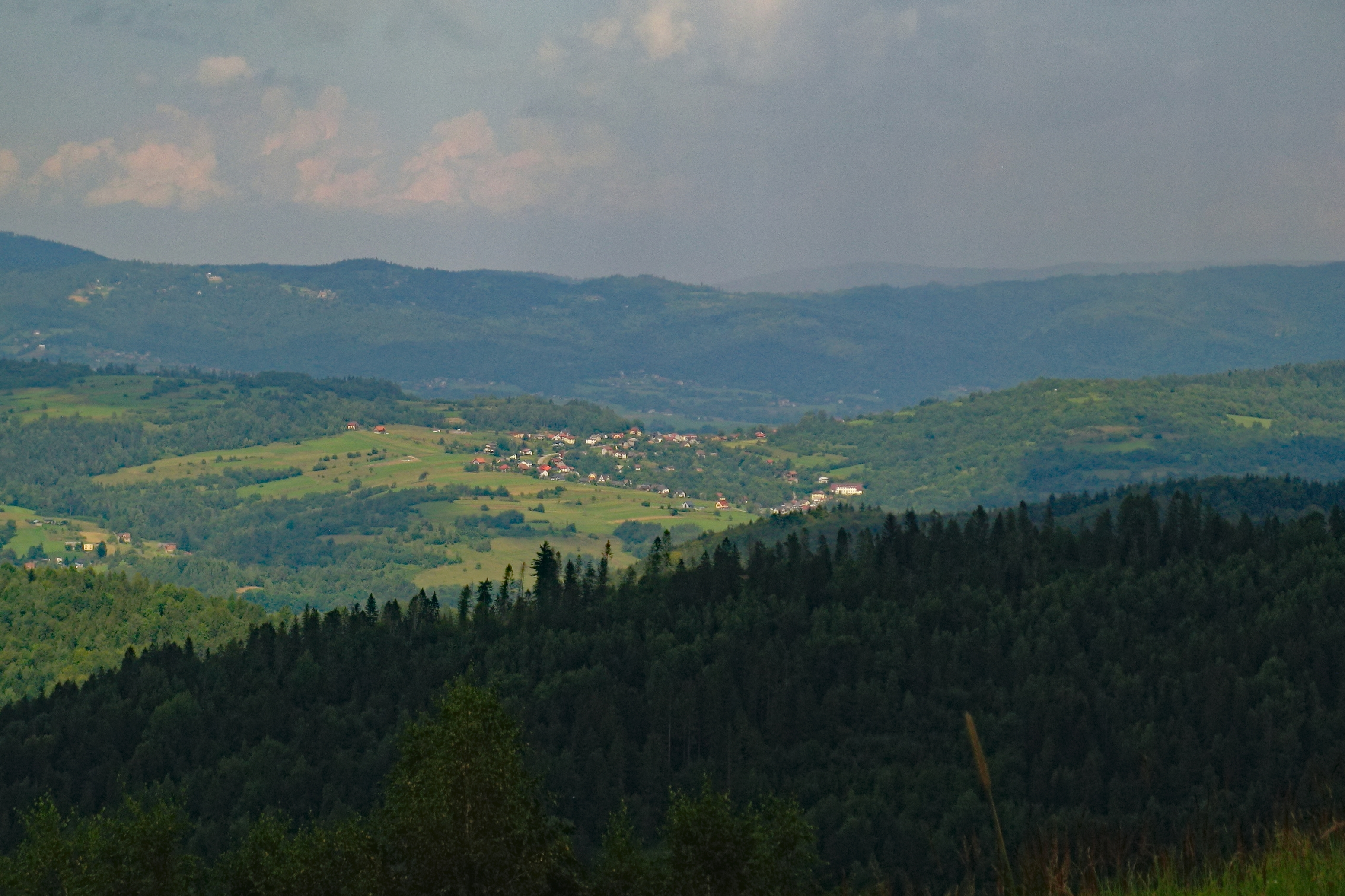
- Rychwałdek, view from Jastrzębica (2020)

- Location within Poland
- Coordinates: 49°41′N 19°16′E
- Country: Poland
- Voivodeship: Silesian
- County: Żywiec
- Gmina: Świnna
- Population: 849

Rychwałdek [rɨxˈfau̯dɛk] is a village in the administrative district of Gmina Świnna, within Żywiec County, Silesian Voivodeship, in southern Poland.
