= Trzebinia, Silesian Voivodeship =

Trzebinia
- Village
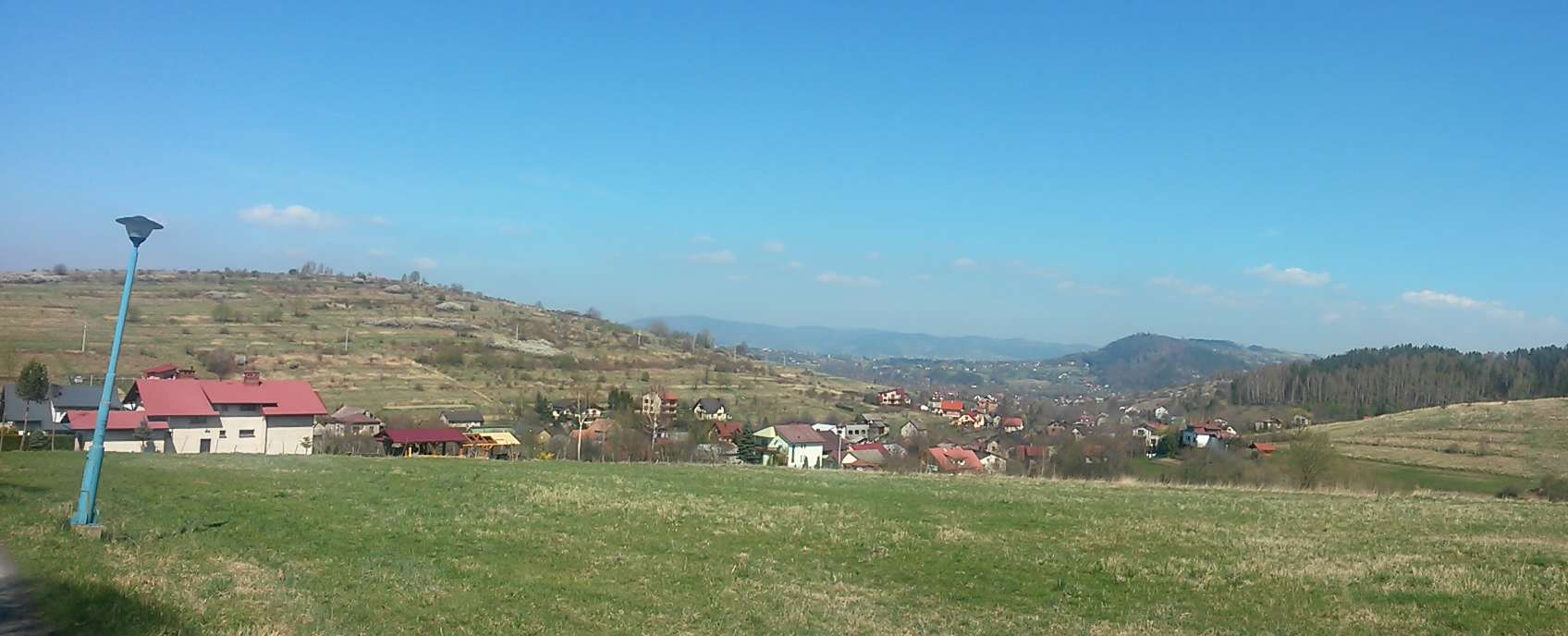
- Panorama of the village

- Location within Poland
- Coordinates: 49°39′N 19°13′E
- Country: Poland
- Voivodeship: Silesian
- County: Żywiec
- Gmina: Świnna
- Population: 1,721

Trzebinia [tʂɛˈbiɲa] is a village in the administrative district of Gmina Świnna, in Żywiec County, Silesian Voivodeship, in southern Poland. It is about 5 kilometres (3 miles) south of Żywiec and 69 kilometres (43 miles) south of the regional capital Katowice.
