= Okrajnik (disambiguation) =

Okrajnik may refer to the following places in Poland:

- Okrajnik in Silesian Voivodeship (south Poland)
- Okrajnik, Jawor County in Lower Silesian Voivodeship (south-west Poland)
