= Brzuśnik =

- Village
- Location within Poland
- Coordinates: 49°38′N 19°11′E
- Country: Poland
- Voivodeship: Silesian
- County: Żywiec
- Gmina: Radziechowy-Wieprz
- Population (approx.): 840

Brzuśnik [ˈbʐuɕnik] is a village in the administrative district of Gmina Radziechowy-Wieprz, within Żywiec County, Silesian Voivodeship, in southern Poland.
