= Bierna, Silesian Voivodeship =

Bierna
- Village
- Location within Poland
- Coordinates: 49°43′N 19°10′E
- Country: Poland
- Voivodeship: Silesian
- County: Żywiec
- Gmina: Łodygowice
- Elevation: 370 m (1,210 ft)
- Population: 933
- Website: http://www.bierna.ovh.org

Bierna [ˈbjɛrna] is a village in the administrative district of Gmina Łodygowice, within Żywiec County, Silesian Voivodeship, in southern Poland.
