= Bystra, Żywiec County =

Bystra
- Village
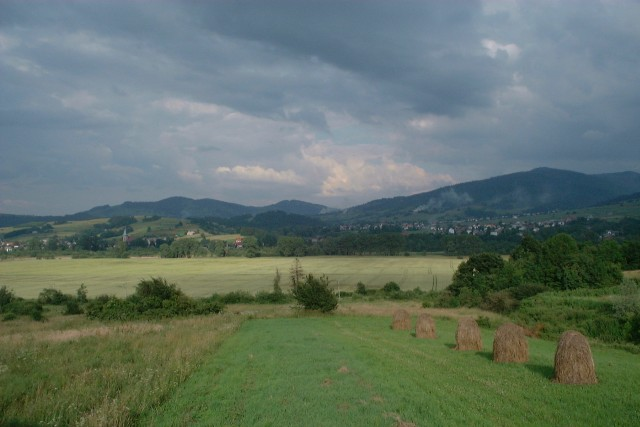
- Bystra

- Location within Poland
- Coordinates: 49°37′10″N 19°11′15″E
- Country: Poland
- Voivodeship: Silesian
- County: Żywiec
- Gmina: Radziechowy-Wieprz
- Population: 946

Bystra [ˈbɨstra] is a village in the administrative district of Gmina Radziechowy-Wieprz, within Żywiec County, Silesian Voivodeship, in southern Poland.
