= Młada Hora =

- Village
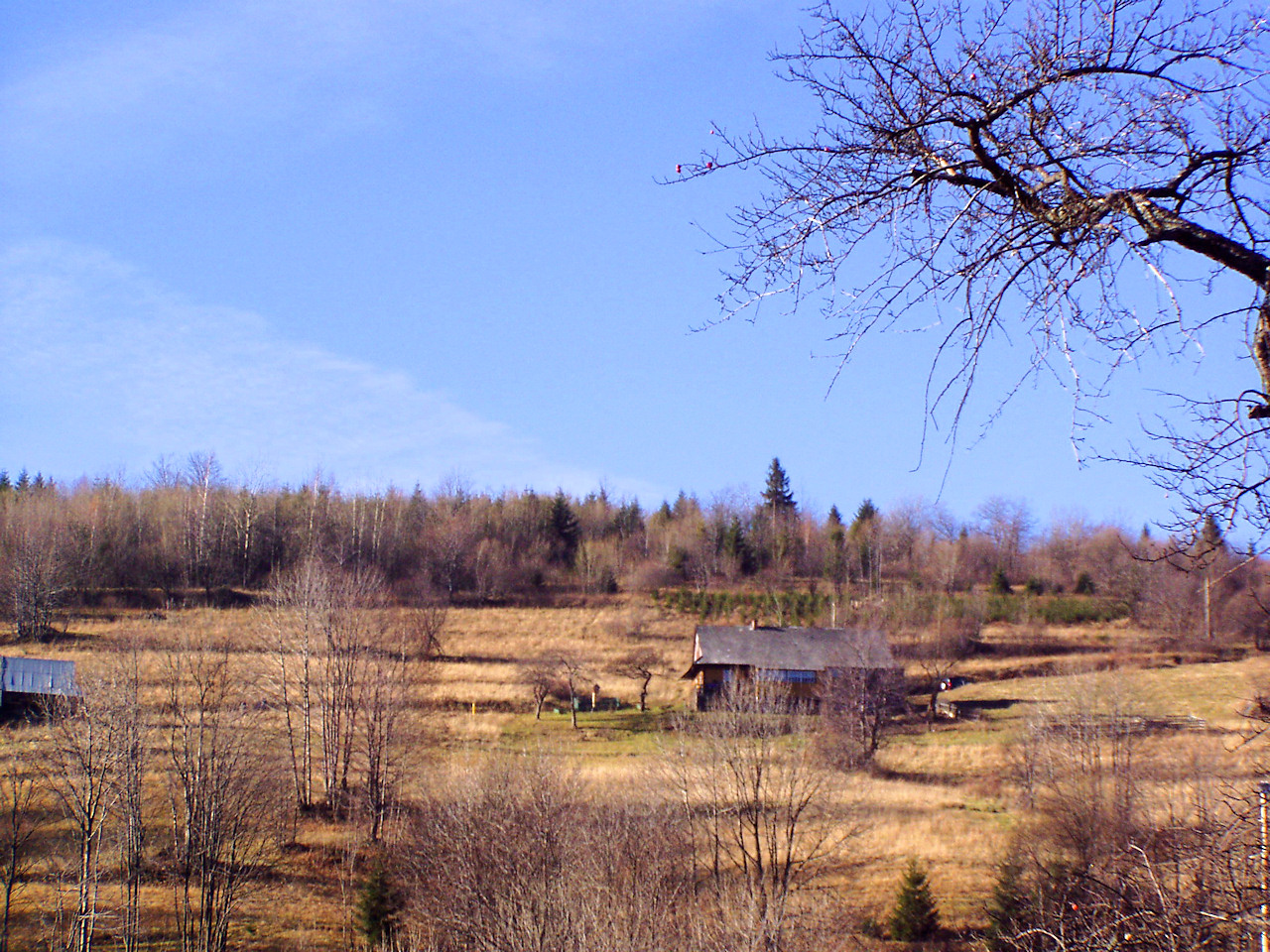
- Part of Młada Hora village

- Location within Poland
- Coordinates: 49°26′26″N 19°5′19″E
- Country: Poland
- Voivodeship: Silesian
- County: Żywiec
- Gmina: Ujsoły
- Highest elevation: 995 m (3,264 ft)
- Lowest elevation: 873 m (2,864 ft)
- Population: 40

Młada Hora [ˈmwada ˈxɔra] is a village in the administrative district of Gmina Ujsoły, within Żywiec County, Silesian Voivodeship, in southern Poland, close to the border with Slovakia.
