= Soblówka =

- Village
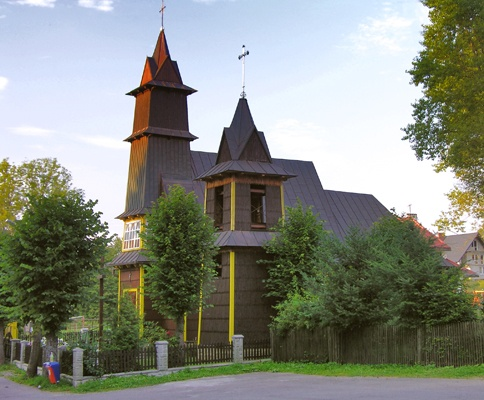
- Church of the Immaculate Heart of the Virgin Mary

- Location within Poland
- Coordinates: 49°26′N 19°8′E
- Country: Poland
- Voivodeship: Silesian
- County: Żywiec
- Gmina: Ujsoły
- Elevation: 650 m (2,130 ft)

Population
  - Total: 687

Soblówka [sɔˈblufka] is a village in the administrative district of Gmina Ujsoły, within Żywiec County, Silesian Voivodeship, in southern Poland, close to the border with Slovakia.
