= Glinka, Silesian Voivodeship =

Glinka
- Village
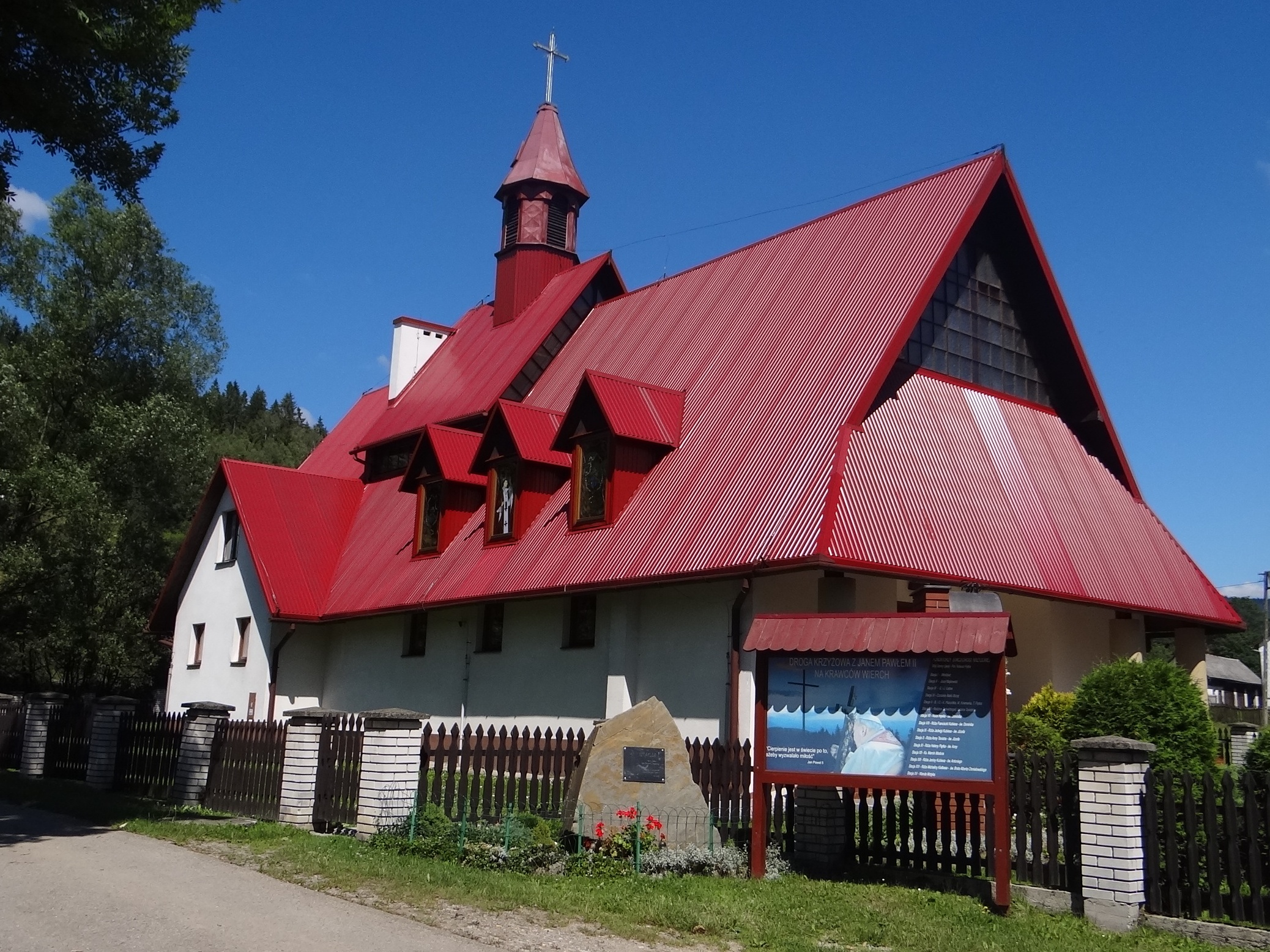
- Church

- Location within Poland
- Coordinates: 49°27′44″N 19°9′41″E
- Country: Poland
- Voivodeship: Silesian
- County: Żywiec
- Gmina: Ujsoły
- Highest elevation: 690 m (2,260 ft)
- Lowest elevation: 600 m (2,000 ft)
- Population: 915

Glinka [ˈɡlinka] is a village in the administrative district of Gmina Ujsoły, within Żywiec County, Silesian Voivodeship, in southern Poland, close to the border with Slovakia.
