= Smereków Wielki, Silesian Voivodeship =

Smereków Wielki
- Village
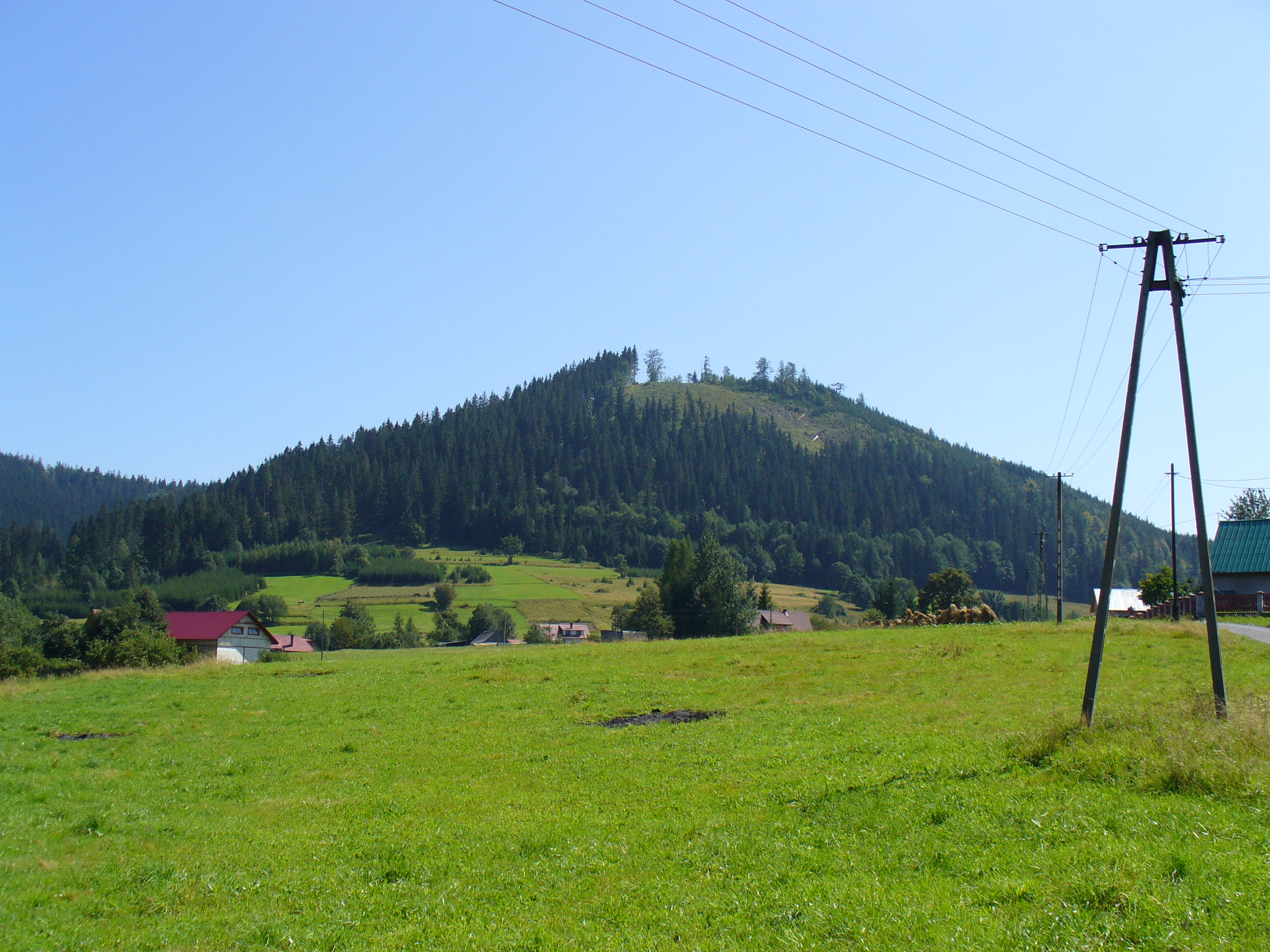

- Location within Poland
- Coordinates: 49°26′15″N 19°9′43″E
- Country: Poland
- Voivodeship: Silesian
- County: Żywiec
- Gmina: Ujsoły

Smereków Wielki (Polish pronunciation: [smɛˈrɛkuv ˈvjɛlkʲi]) is a village in the administrative district of Gmina Ujsoły, within Żywiec County, Silesian Voivodeship, in southern Poland, close to the border with Slovakia.
