= Żabnica, Silesian Voivodeship =

Żabnica
- Village
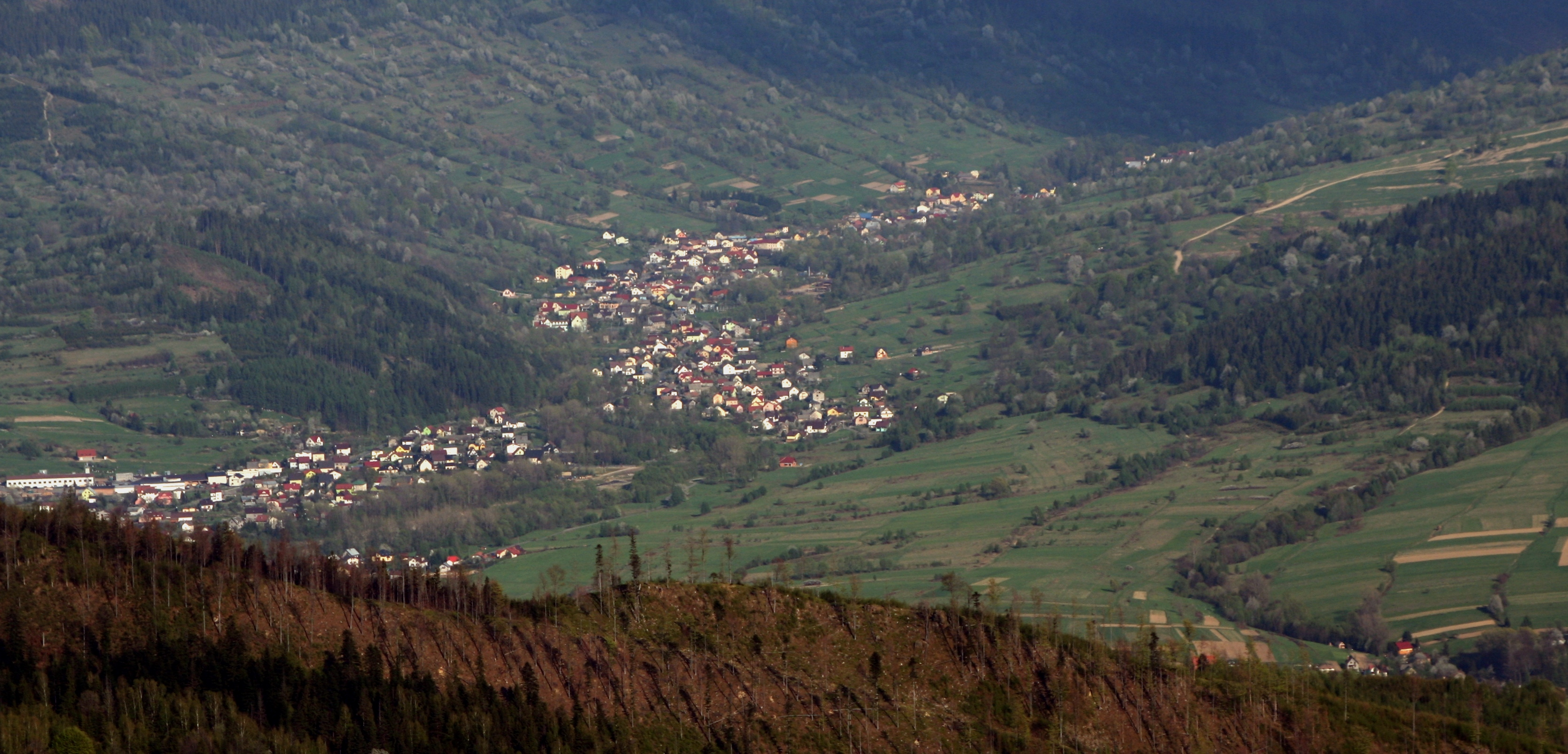
- Żabnica seen from Barania Góra

- Location within Poland
- Coordinates: 49°34′50″N 19°9′23″E
- Country: Poland
- Voivodeship: Silesian
- County: Żywiec
- Gmina: Węgierska Górka
- Population: 3,165

Żabnica [ʐabˈnit͡sa] is a village in the administrative district of Gmina Węgierska Górka, within Żywiec County, Silesian Voivodeship, in southern Poland.
