= Kocierz Rychwałdzki =

- Village
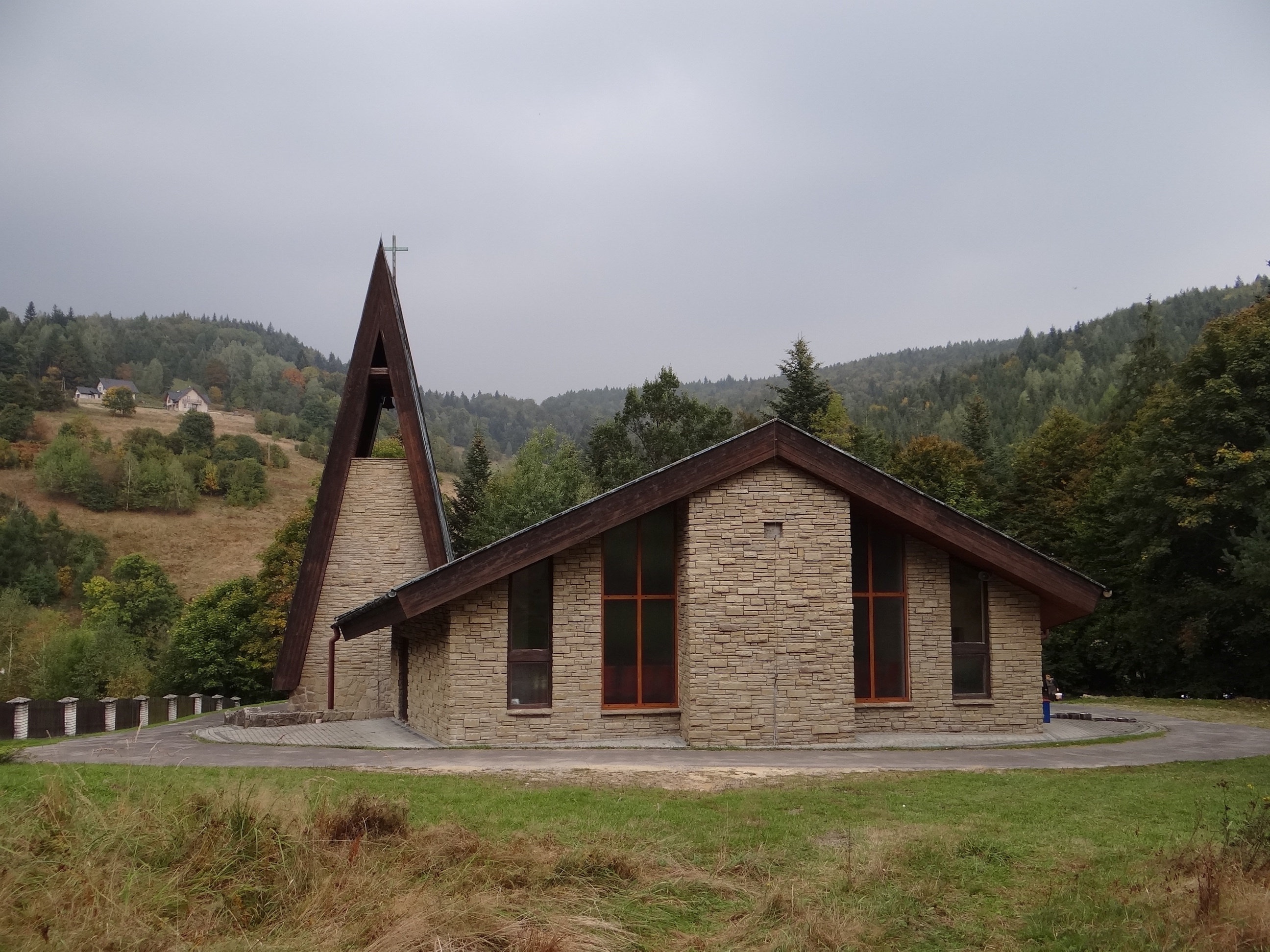
- Chapel of the Heart of Mary

- Location within Poland
- Coordinates: 49°45′N 19°19′E
- Country: Poland
- Voivodeship: Silesian
- County: Żywiec
- Gmina: Łękawica

Population
  - Total: 289

Kocierz Rychwałdzki [ˈkɔt͡ɕɛʂ rɨxˈfau̯t͡ski] is a village in the administrative district of Gmina Łękawica, within Żywiec County, Silesian Voivodeship, in southern Poland.
