= Ostre, Silesian Voivodeship =

Ostre
- Village
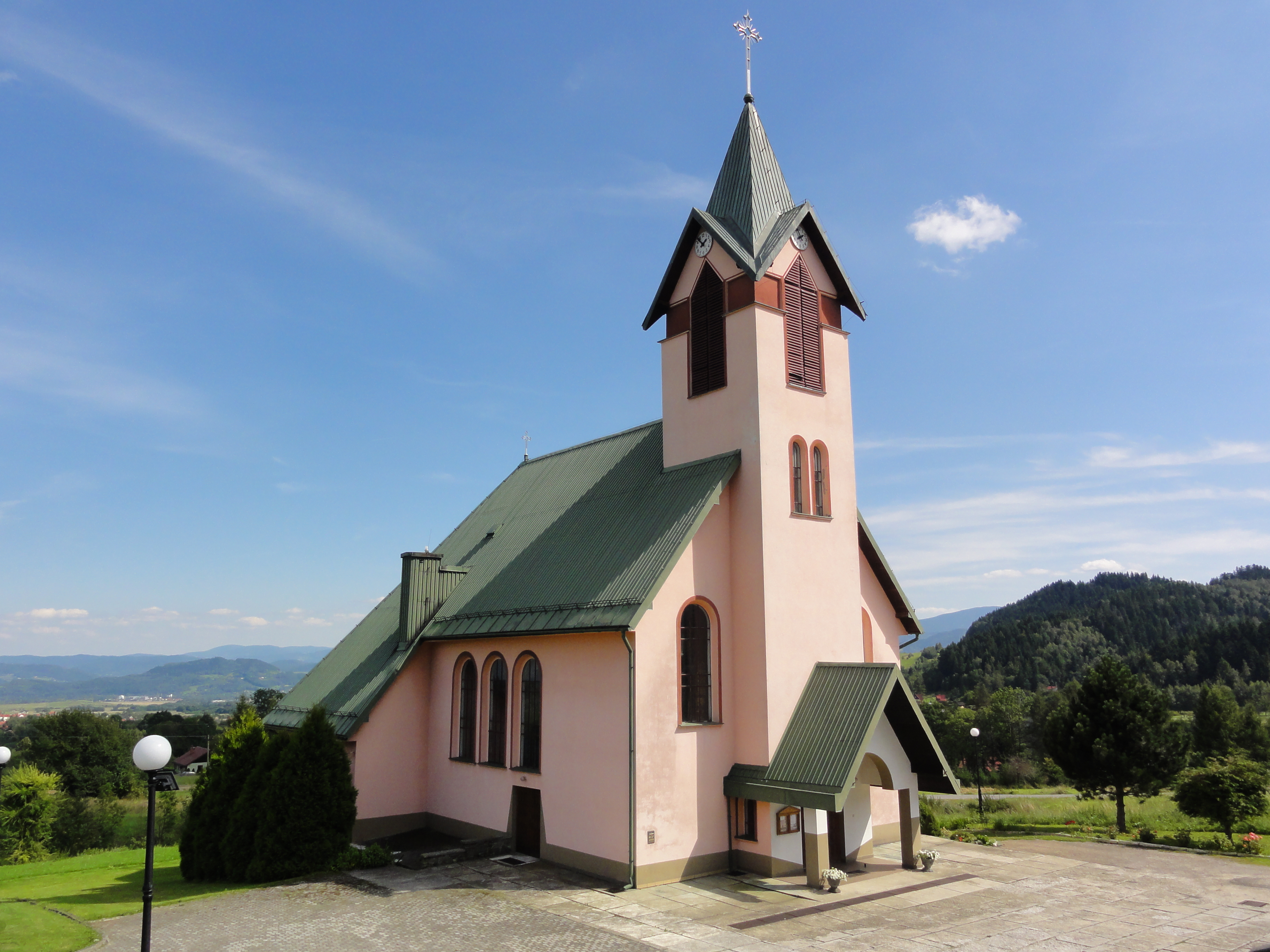
- Saint Mary Church

- Location within Poland
- Coordinates: 49°39′46″N 19°4′55″E
- Country: Poland
- Voivodeship: Silesian
- County: Żywiec
- Gmina: Lipowa
- Established: early 17th century
- Population (2008): 477
- Post Code: 34-324
- Area Code: (+48) 33
- Vehicle registration: SZY

Ostre [ˈɔstrɛ] is a village in the administrative district of Gmina Lipowa, within Żywiec County, Silesian Voivodeship, in southern Poland.

The village was established in the early 17th century on the slopes of Ostre mountain in Silesian Beskids, originally named Podostre.
