= Twardorzeczka =

- Village
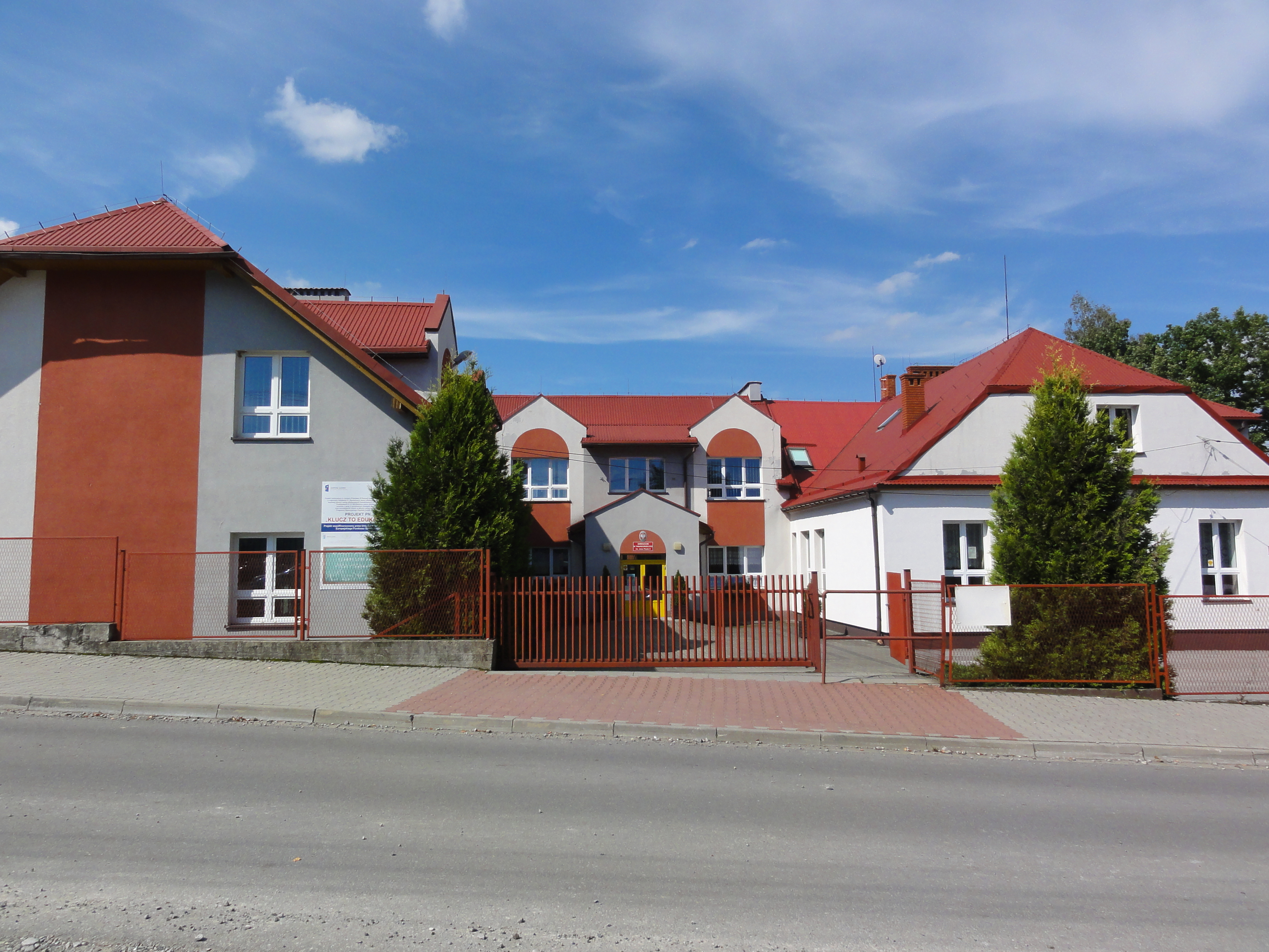
- Elementary school and gymnasium

- Location within Poland
- Coordinates: 49°39′N 19°5′E
- Country: Poland
- Voivodeship: Silesian
- County: Żywiec
- Gmina: Lipowa
- Established (separation from Radziechowy): 1948
- Highest elevation: 550 m (1,800 ft)
- Lowest elevation: 420 m (1,380 ft)
- Population: 1,204

Twardorzeczka [tfardɔˈʐɛt͡ʂka] is a village in the administrative district of Gmina Lipowa, within Żywiec County, Silesian Voivodeship, in southern Poland.

It lies in Żywiec Basin alongside a Twardorzeczka stream flowing out from Silesian Beskids. There are two Tilia trees registered as natural monuments in the village. The village began as a hamlet of Radziechowy, where it belonged to until its separation in 1948.

Monika Brodka, a Polish singer, grew up in the village.
