= Stawiska, Silesian Voivodeship =

Stawiska
- Village
- Location within Poland
- Coordinates: 49°28′23″N 19°6′8″E
- Country: Poland
- Voivodeship: Silesian
- County: Żywiec
- Gmina: Ujsoły

Stawiska [staˈviska] is a village in the administrative district of Gmina Ujsoły, within Żywiec County, Silesian Voivodeship, in southern Poland, close to the border with Slovakia.
