= Cisiec =

- Village
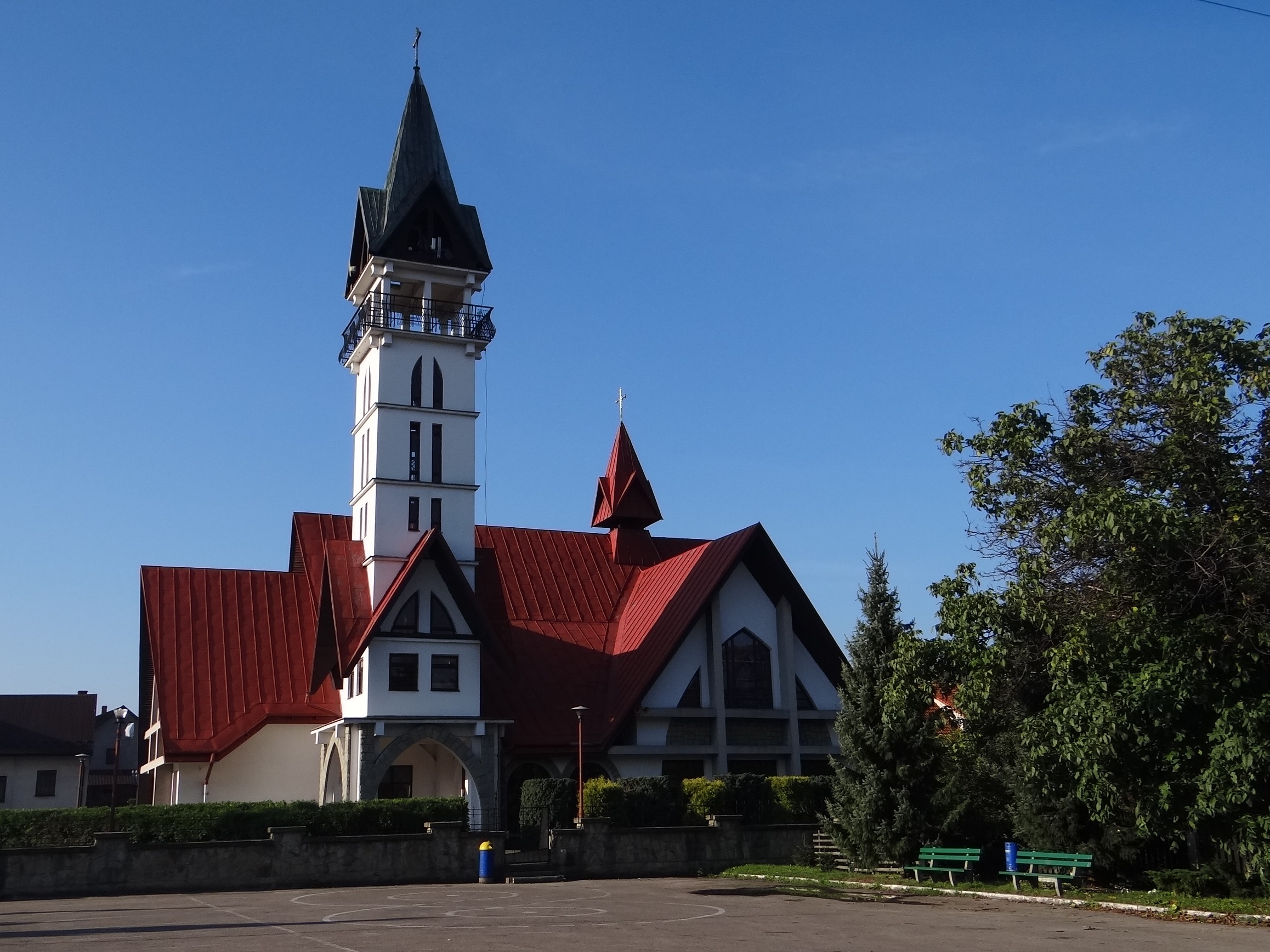
- Church

- Location within Poland
- Coordinates: 49°35′N 19°6′E
- Country: Poland
- Voivodeship: Silesian
- County: Żywiec
- Gmina: Węgierska Górka
- Elevation: 400 m (1,300 ft)
- Population: 3,214

Cisiec [ˈt͡ɕiɕɛt͡s] is a village in the administrative district of Gmina Węgierska Górka, within Żywiec County, Silesian Voivodeship, in southern Poland.
