= Rychwałd, Silesian Voivodeship =

Rychwałd
- Village
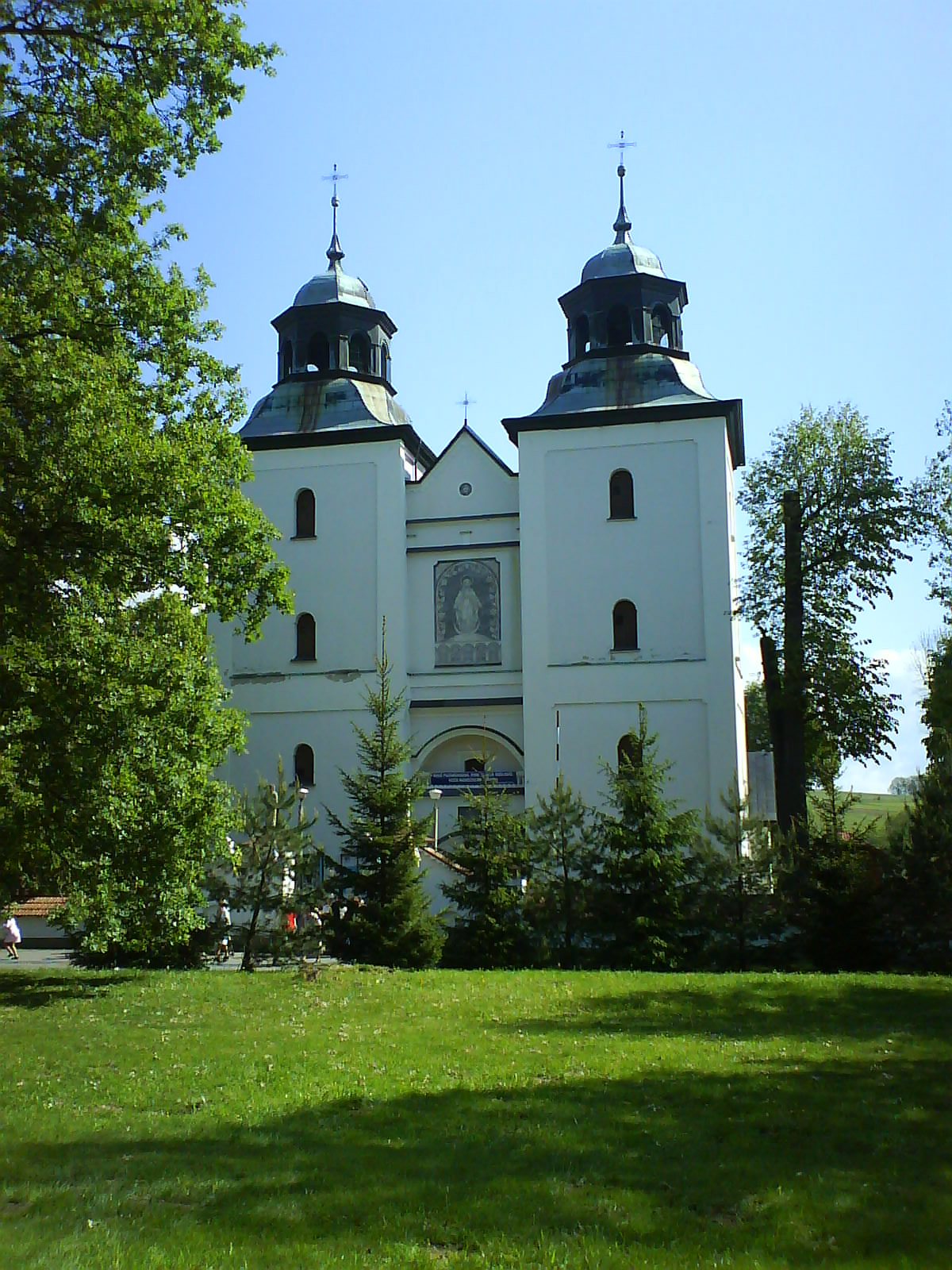
- Local sanctuary

- Location within Poland
- Coordinates: 49°41′57″N 19°16′12″E
- Country: Poland
- Voivodeship: Silesian
- County: Żywiec
- Gmina: Gilowice
- Highest elevation: 650 m (2,130 ft)
- Lowest elevation: 450 m (1,480 ft)
- Population: 1,491

Rychwałd [ˈrɨxfau̯t] is a village in the administrative district of Gmina Gilowice, within Żywiec County, Silesian Voivodeship, in southern Poland.
