= Cicha, Silesian Voivodeship =

Cicha
- Village
- Location within Poland
- Coordinates: 49°26′54″N 19°8′39″E
- Country: Poland
- Voivodeship: Silesian
- County: Żywiec
- Gmina: Ujsoły

Cicha [ˈt͡ɕixa] is a village in the administrative district of Gmina Ujsoły, within Żywiec County, Silesian Voivodeship, in southern Poland, close to the border with Slovakia.
