= Juszczyna =

- Village
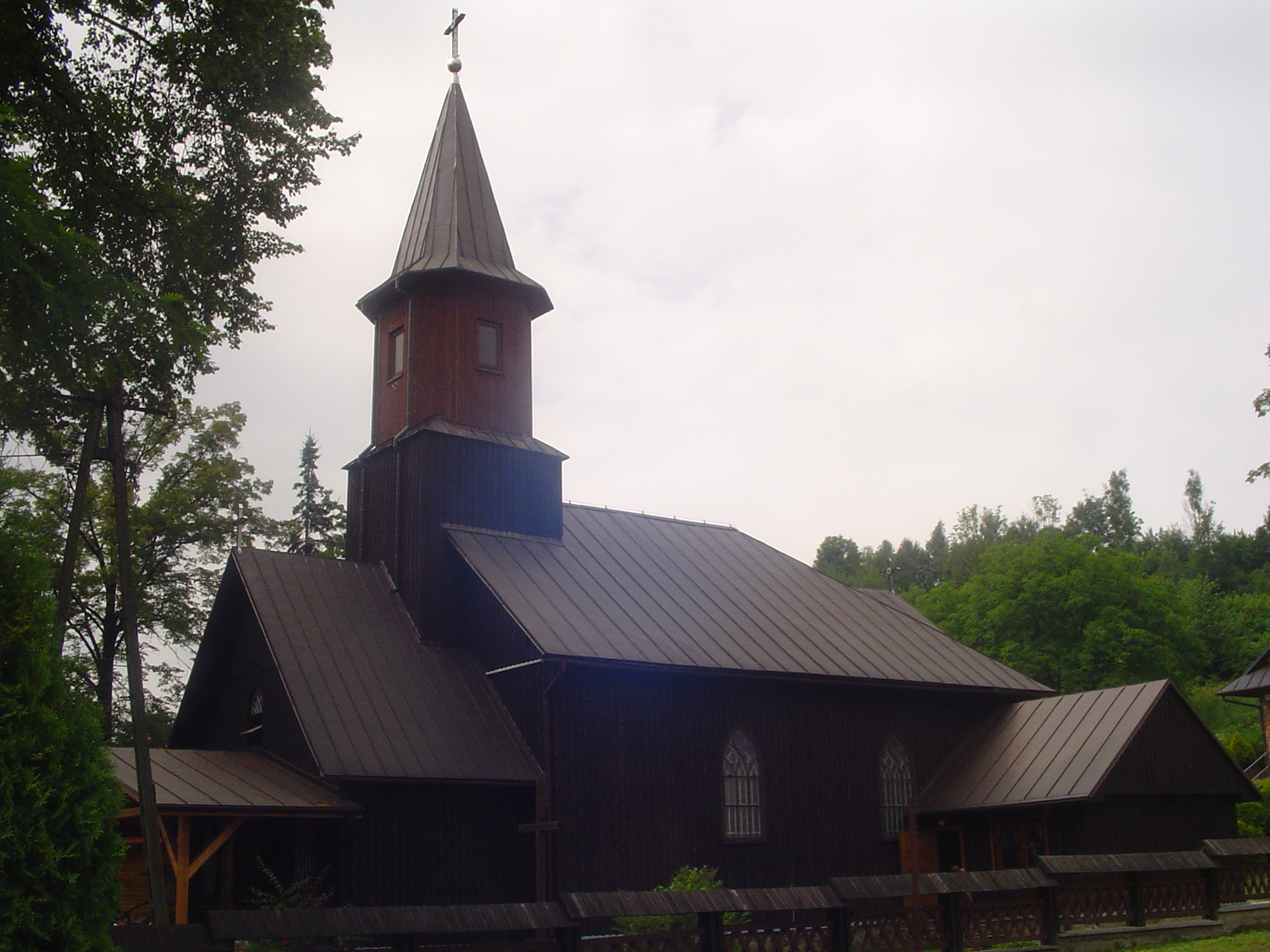
- The wooden Visitation of the Blessed Virgin Mary church

- Location within Poland
- Coordinates: 49°37′43″N 19°13′37″E
- Country: Poland
- Voivodeship: Silesian
- County: Żywiec
- Gmina: Radziechowy-Wieprz
- Population (approx.): 1,700

Juszczyna [juʂˈt͡ʂɨna] is a village in the administrative district of Gmina Radziechowy-Wieprz, within Żywiec County, Silesian Voivodeship, in southern Poland.

The wooden Visitation of the Blessed Virgin Mary church was built in 1922 to commemorate the 21 people who died in the flash flood of 16 July 1908.
