= Przybędza =

- Village
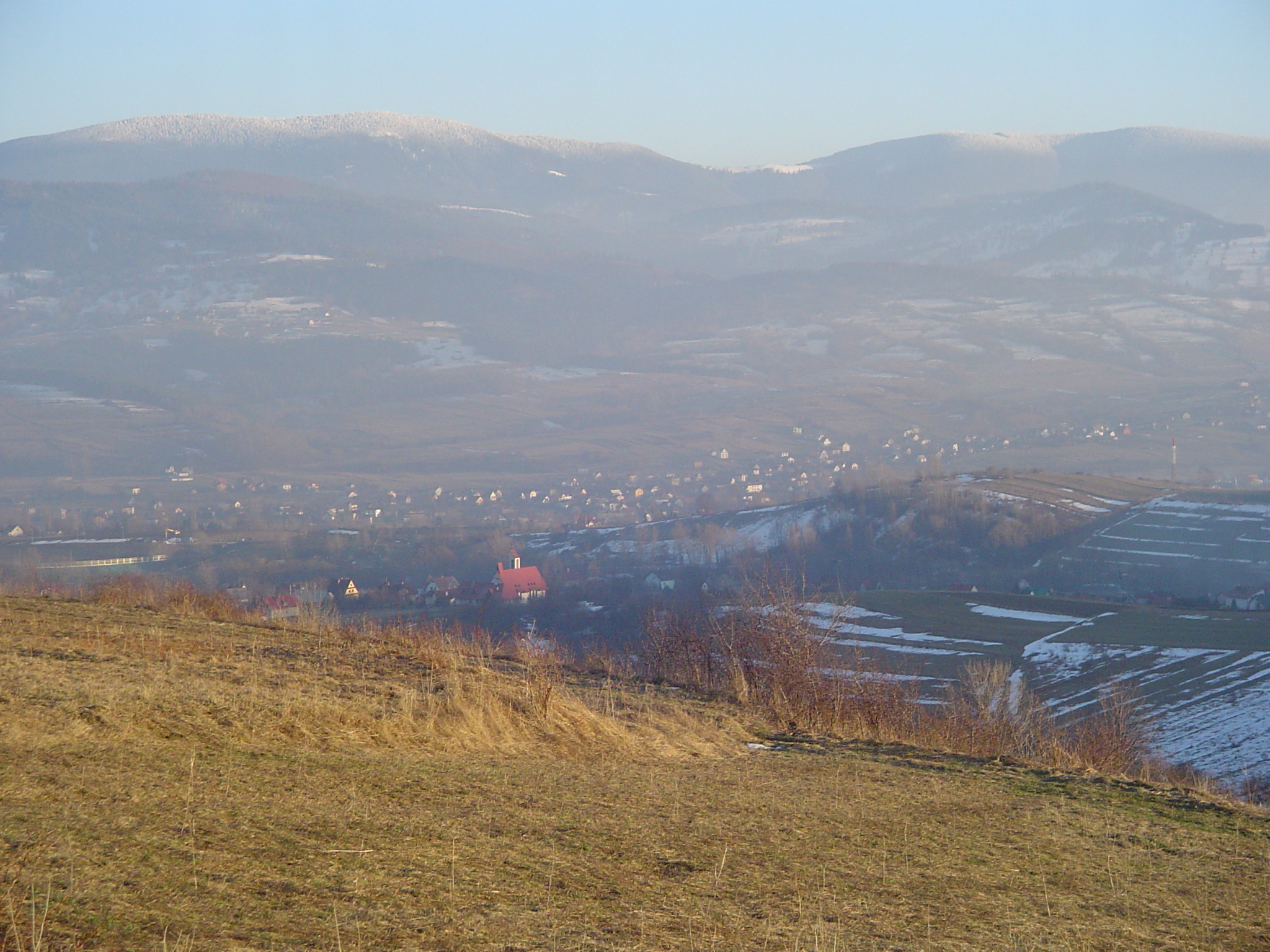
- Przybędza seen from Matyska hill

- Location within Poland
- Coordinates: 49°37′N 19°7′E
- Country: Poland
- Voivodeship: Silesian
- County: Żywiec
- Gmina: Radziechowy-Wieprz
- Highest elevation: 500 m (1,600 ft)
- Lowest elevation: 420 m (1,380 ft)
- Population (approx.): 1,000

Przybędza [pʂɨˈbɛnd͡za] is a village in the administrative district of Gmina Radziechowy-Wieprz, within Żywiec County, Silesian Voivodeship, in southern Poland.
