= Pietrzykowice, Silesian Voivodeship =

Pietrzykowice
- Village
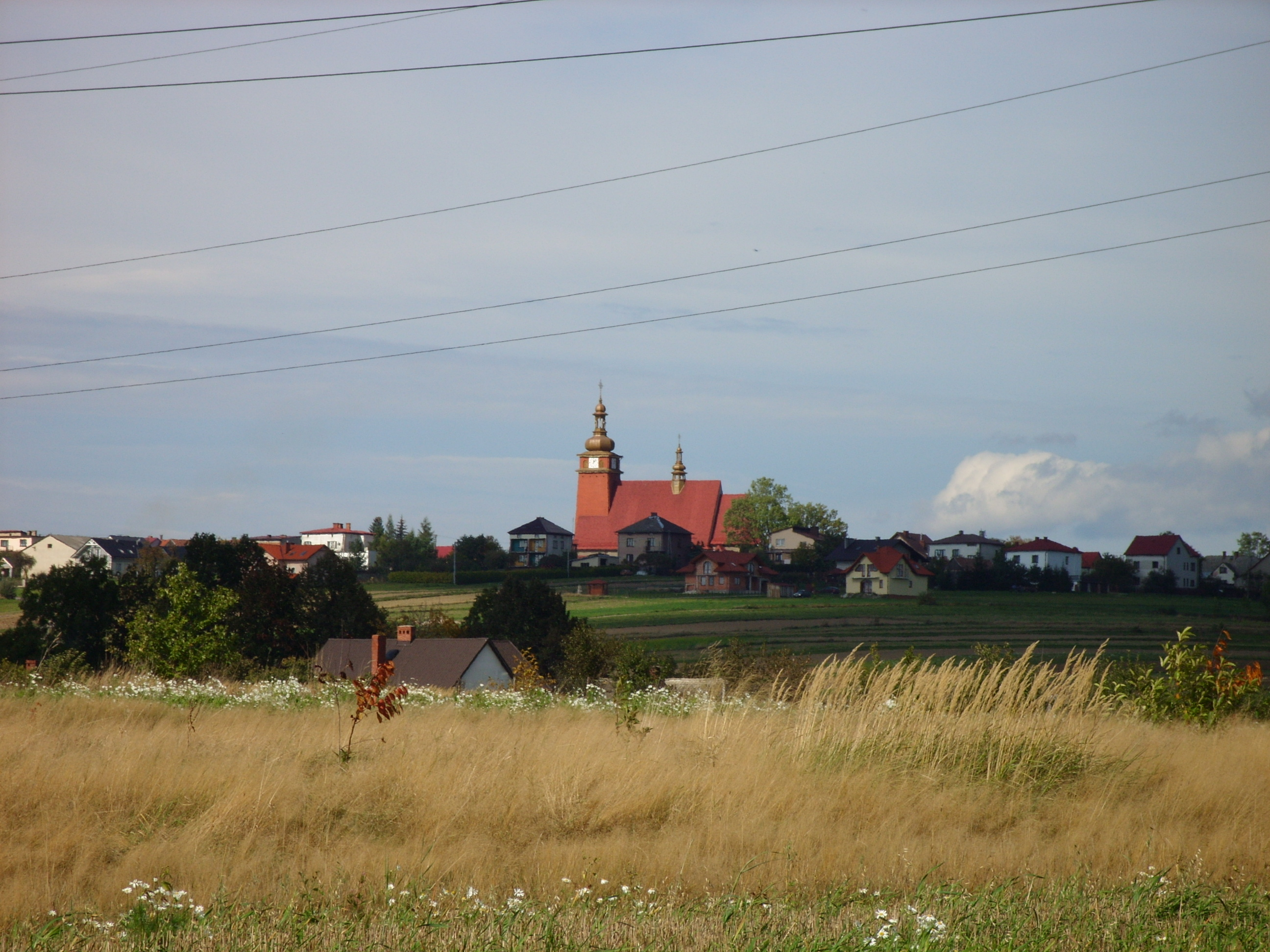

- Location within Poland
- Coordinates: 49°41′N 19°9′E
- Country: Poland
- Voivodeship: Silesian
- County: Żywiec
- Gmina: Łodygowice
- Established: 13th century
- Area: 10.913 km^{2} (4.214 sq mi)
- Highest elevation: 440 m (1,440 ft)
- Lowest elevation: 340 m (1,120 ft)
- Population: 4,279
  - Density: 392.1/km^{2} (1,016/sq mi)

Pietrzykowice [pjɛtʂɨkɔˈvit͡sɛ] is a village in the administrative district of Gmina Łodygowice, within Żywiec County, Silesian Voivodeship, in southern Poland.

It is one of the oldest villages in Żywiec Basin. It was established in the 13th century, and in the early 14th century belonged to the Cistercian monastery in Rudy.
