= Przyłęków =

- Village
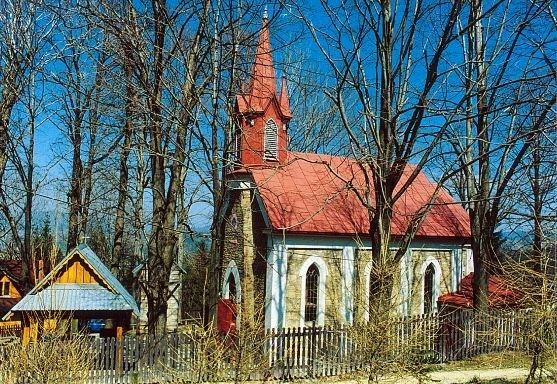
- Church

- Location within Poland
- Coordinates: 49°38′N 19°15′E
- Country: Poland
- Voivodeship: Silesian
- County: Żywiec
- Gmina: Świnna
- Population: 369

Przyłęków [pʂɨˈwɛnkuf] is a village in the administrative district of Gmina Świnna, within Żywiec County, Silesian Voivodeship, in southern Poland.

== History ==
Following the 1939 Invasion of Poland, which started World War II, Przyłęków was occupied by Nazi Germany and annexed to the German Province of Upper Silesia. The Red Army captured the village on 5 February 1945, ending the Nazi occupation.
