= Łysina, Silesian Voivodeship =

Łysina
- Village
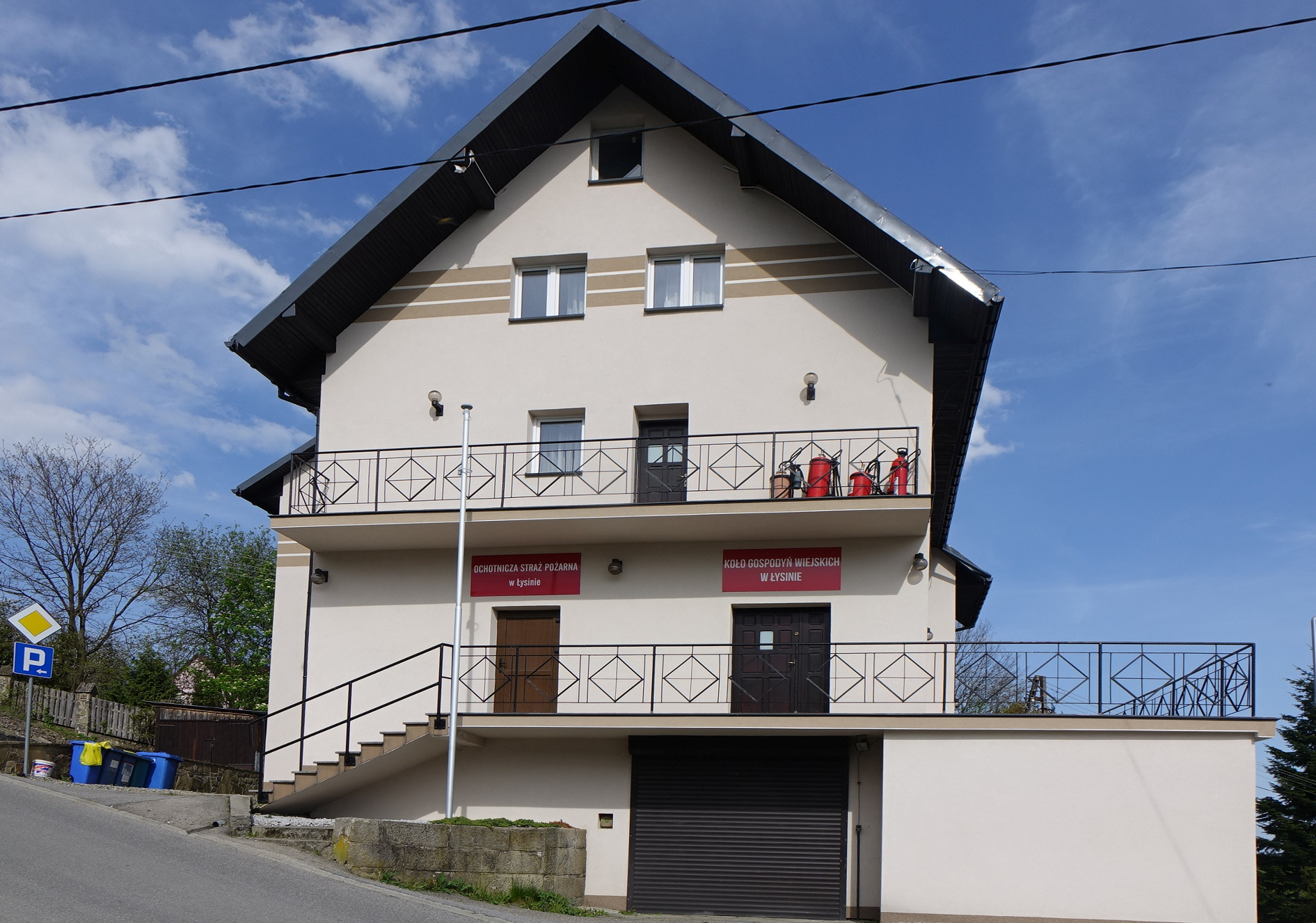
- Fire station

- Location within Poland
- Coordinates: 49°44′N 19°17′E
- Country: Poland
- Voivodeship: Silesian
- County: Żywiec
- Gmina: Łękawica
- Highest elevation: 730 m (2,400 ft)
- Lowest elevation: 670 m (2,200 ft)
- Population: 127

Łysina [wɨˈɕina] is a village in the administrative district of Gmina Łękawica, within Żywiec County, Silesian Voivodeship, in southern Poland.
