= Leśna, Żywiec County =

Leśna
- Village
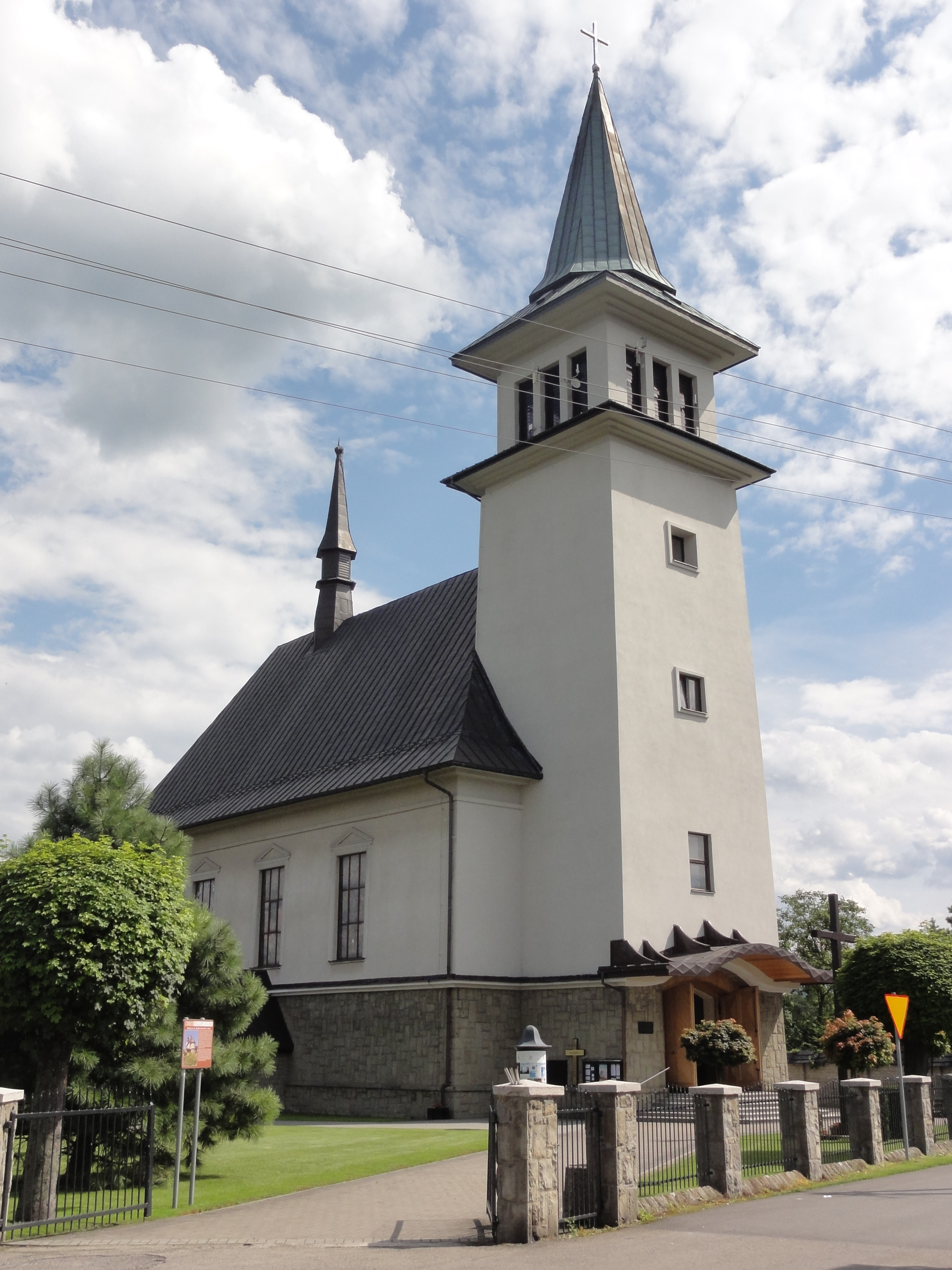
- Saint Michael Archangel Church

- Location within Poland
- Coordinates: 49°40′12″N 19°7′58″E
- Country: Poland
- Voivodeship: Silesian
- County: Żywiec
- Gmina: Lipowa
- Population: 2,093

Leśna [ˈlɛɕna] is a village in the administrative district of Gmina Lipowa, within Żywiec County, Silesian Voivodeship, in southern Poland.
