= Słotwina =

Słotwina may refer to the following places in Poland:

- Słotwina, Lower Silesian Voivodeship (south-west Poland)
- Słotwina, Żywiec County in Silesian Voivodeship (south Poland)
