= Sienna, Silesian Voivodeship =

Sienna
- Village
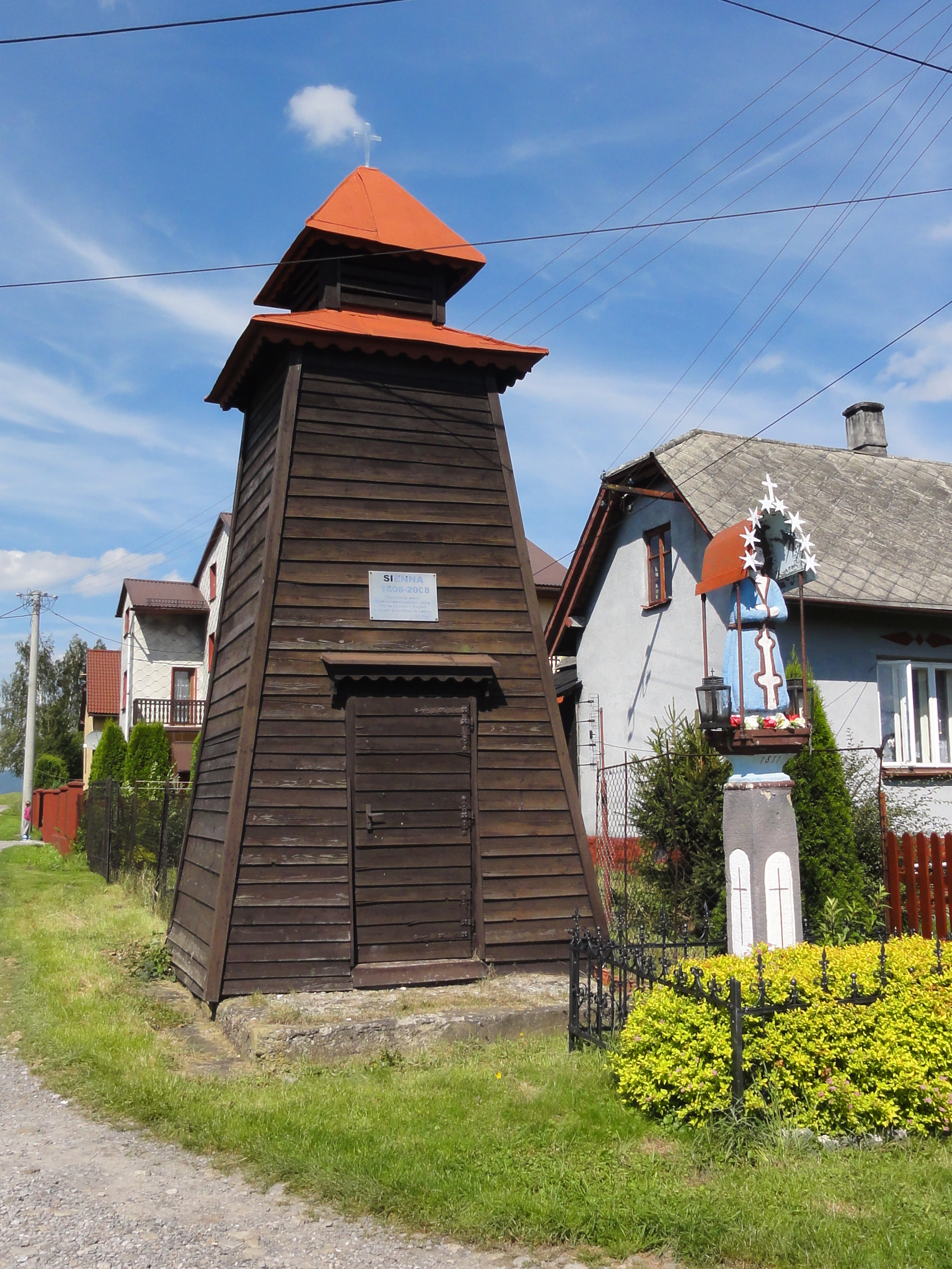
- Wooden bell tower

- Location within Poland
- Coordinates: 49°40′N 19°8′E
- Country: Poland
- Voivodeship: Silesian
- County: Żywiec
- Gmina: Lipowa
- Established: 1608
- Highest elevation: 416 m (1,365 ft)
- Lowest elevation: 394 m (1,293 ft)
- Population: 952

Sienna [ˈɕɛnna] is a village in the administrative district of Gmina Lipowa, within Żywiec County, Silesian Voivodeship, in southern Poland.

The village was established in 1608 by Mikołaj Komorowski, the owner of Żywiec Latifundium.
