= Złatna =

Złatna Zlatna
- Village
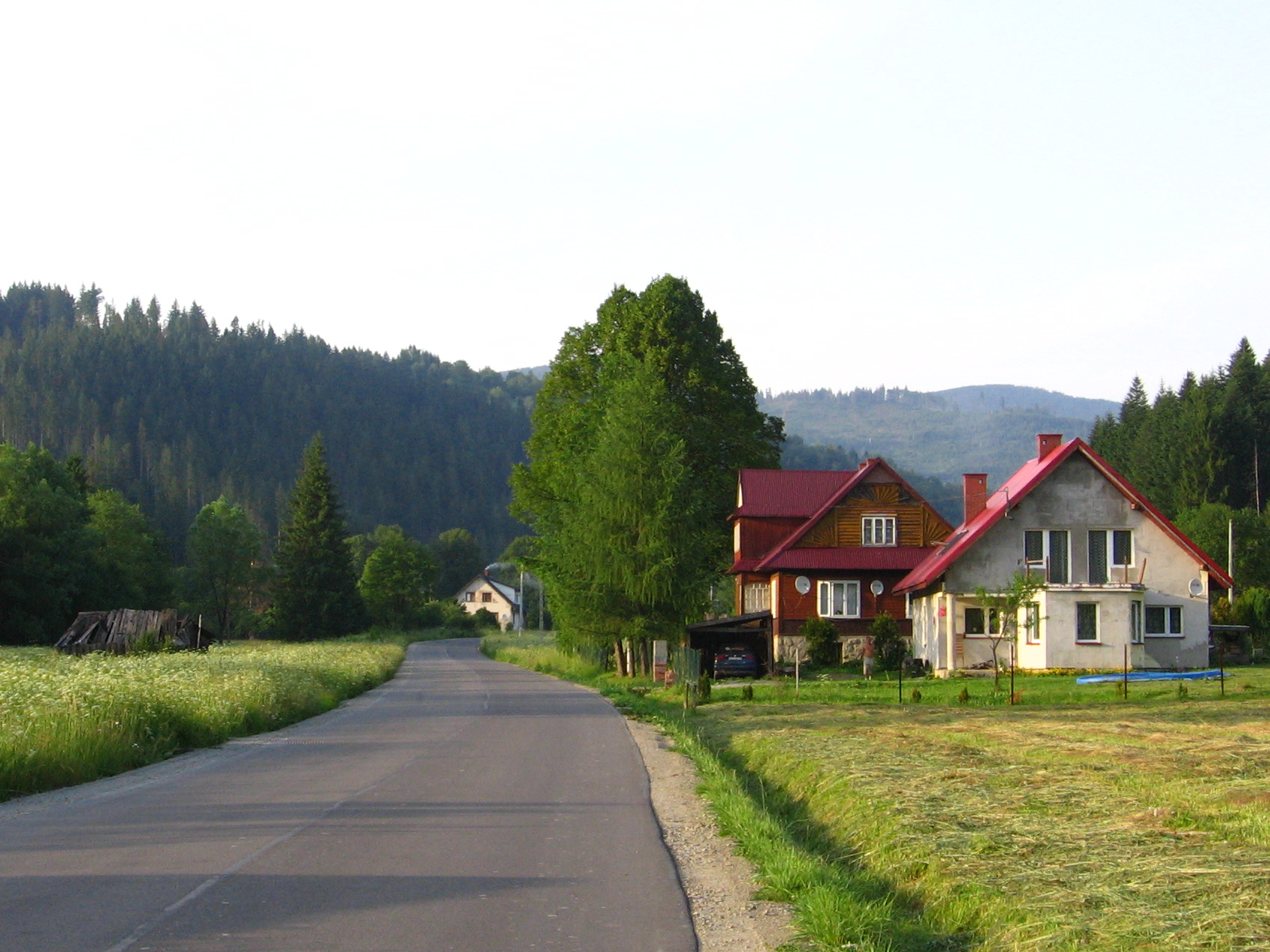

- Location within Poland
- Coordinates: 49°29′N 19°10′E
- Country: Poland
- Voivodeship: Silesian
- County: Żywiec
- Gmina: Ujsoły
- Population: 801

Złatna [ˈzwatna] is a village in the administrative district of Gmina Ujsoły, within Żywiec County, Silesian Voivodeship, in southern Poland, close to the border with Slovakia.
