= Zarzecze, Żywiec County =

Zarzecze
- Village
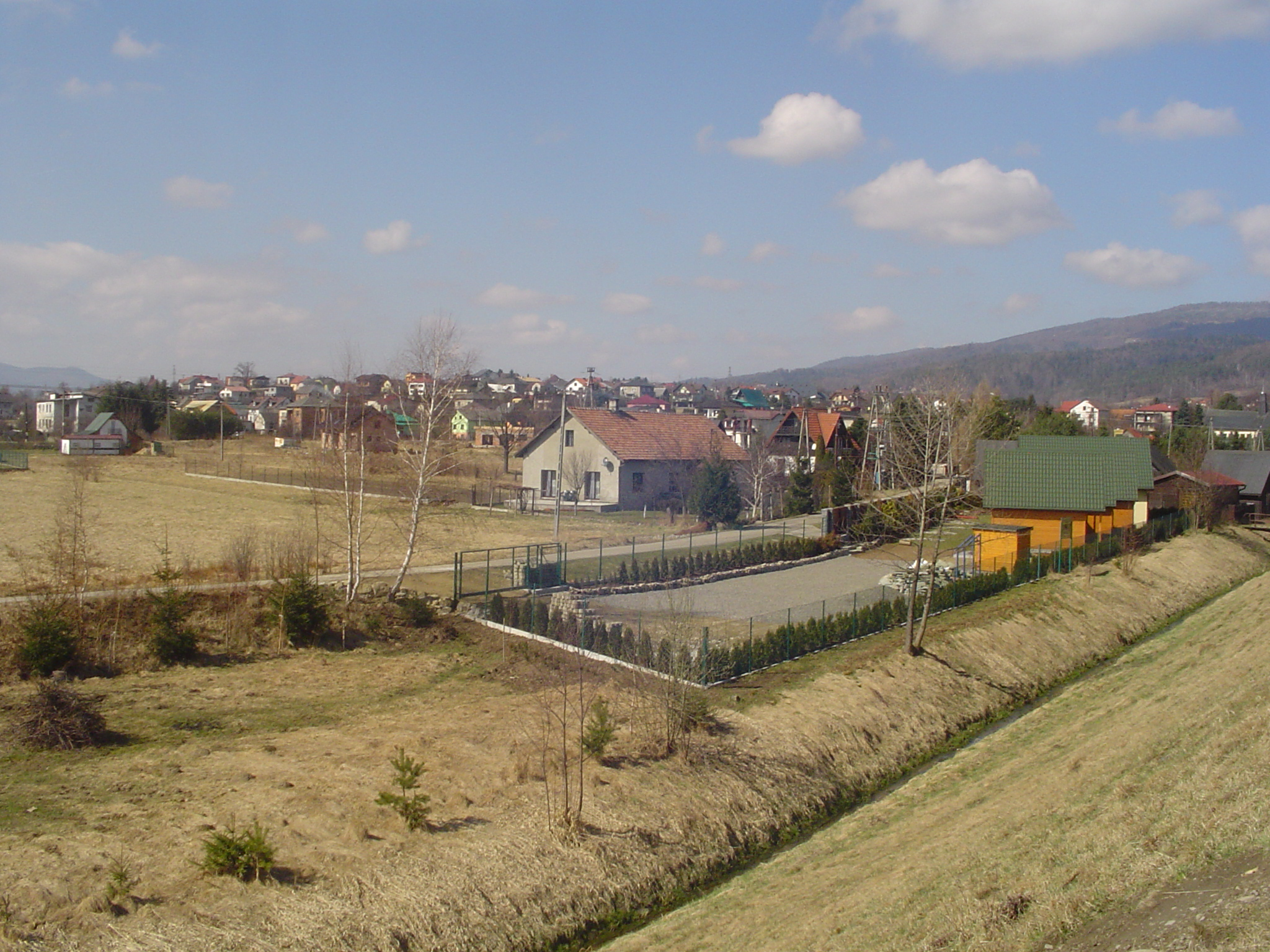
- Zarzecze

- Location within Poland
- Coordinates: 49°43′N 19°10′E
- Country: Poland
- Voivodeship: Silesian
- County: Żywiec
- Gmina: Łodygowice
- Population: 1,319
- Website: http://www.zarzecze.org

Zarzecze [zaˈʐɛt͡ʂɛ] is a village in the administrative district of Gmina Łodygowice, within Żywiec County, Silesian Voivodeship, in southern Poland.
