= Józef Hulka =

Polish sculptor (1926–2026)

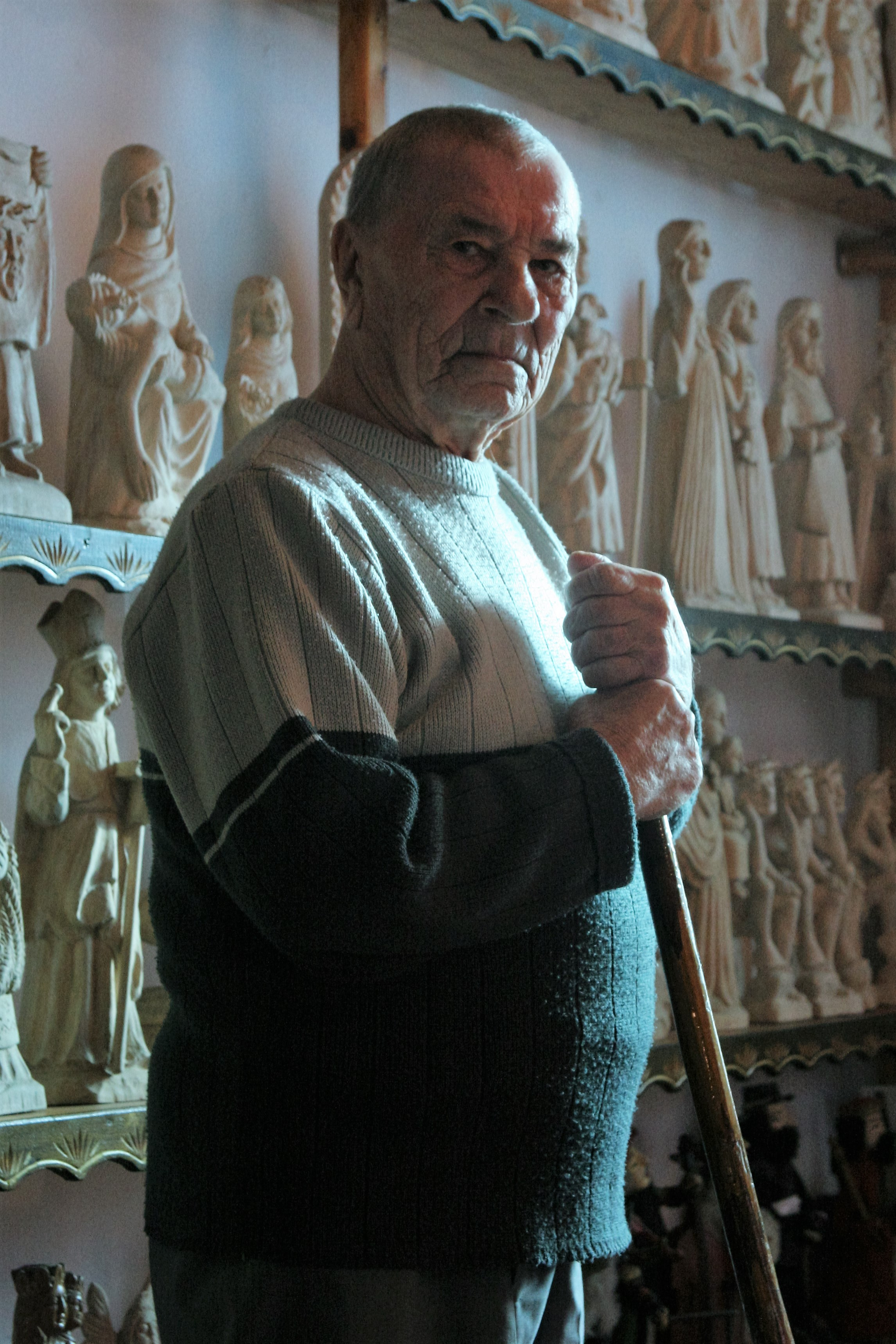
- Hulka in 2016
- Born: 28 February 1926; Łękawica, Poland
- Died: 25 July 2026 (aged 100)
- Occupations: Sculptor, glass painter, puppeteer
- Spouse: Anna Hulka
- Awards: 2nd place in the Folk Sculpture Competition (1973); 3rd place in the Competition of Contemporary Painting on Glass of the Polish Carpathians (1976); Oskar Kolberg Award (1992); Award of the Minister of Culture and Art (1998); Meritorious Activist of Culture (2001); Gloria Artis Medal for Merit to Culture (2026)

Józef Hulka (28 February 1926 – 25 July 2026) was a Polish sculptor and glass painter. During his career, he won the Oskar Kolberg Award in 1992 and the Gloria Artis Medal for Merit to Culture in 2026.

== Early life and career ==
Józef Hulka was born on 28 February 1926, in Łękawica, Poland, and was raised in the Żywiec Beskids region.

Hulka started getting interested in sculpting when he was young. He trained as a carpenter by trade. He began carving with wood carving. He used local woods, including alder, linden, and birch. He also performed a puppet show during the Christmas festival.

His sculptures were mostly of Jesus Christ and Mary, mother of Jesus; as well as saints, angels, and biblical people. Hulka carved the figures from the woods he found for the church of St. Michael the Archangel in Łękawica (named for St. Michael the Archangel, which was built in 1995. After the original wooden church burned down in 1992, he created several sculptures, including the Stations of the Cross.

Hulka sang carols himself and put on puppet shows using figures he made. His wife, Anna, helped him make the masks and puppets before making her own art. He also wrote old carol song lyrics, which were published by the Żywiec Museum in the songbook Hej kolęda będzie.

== Personal life and death ==
Hulka was married to Anna Hulka, a sculptor.

Hulka died on 25 July 2026, at the age of 100.
