= Szczytkówka =

- Village
- Location within Poland
- Coordinates: 49°27′52″N 19°7′55″E
- Country: Poland
- Voivodeship: Silesian
- County: Żywiec
- Gmina: Ujsoły

Szczytkówka [ʂt͡ʂɨtˈkufka] is a village in the administrative district of Gmina Ujsoły, within Żywiec County, Silesian Voivodeship, in southern Poland, close to the border with Slovakia.
