= Słotwina, Żywiec County =

Słotwina
- Village
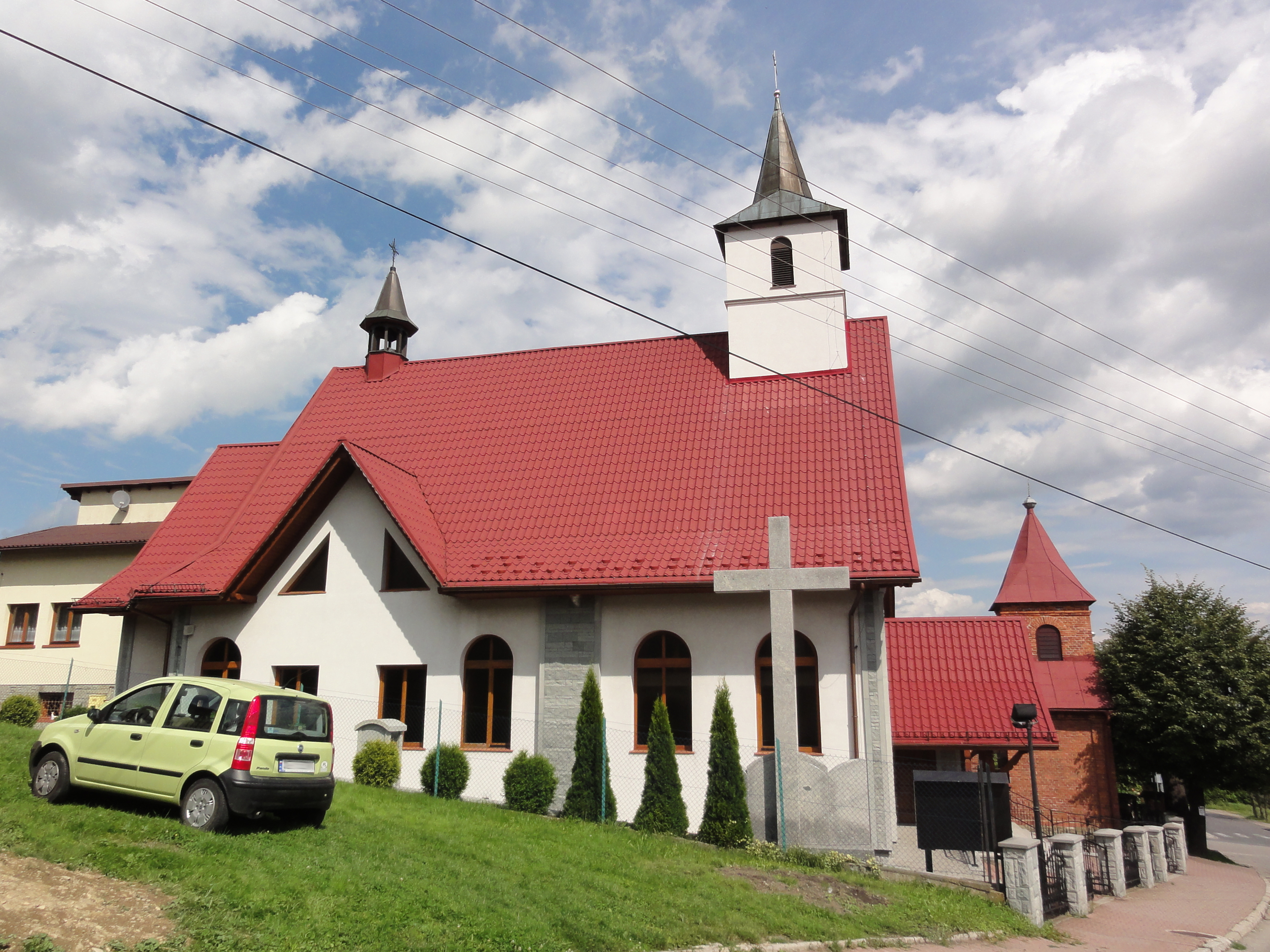
- Church and chapel

- Location within Poland
- Coordinates: 49°41′58″N 19°4′31″E
- Country: Poland
- Voivodeship: Silesian
- County: Żywiec
- Gmina: Lipowa
- Highest elevation: 570 m (1,870 ft)
- Lowest elevation: 430 m (1,410 ft)
- Population: 804

Słotwina [swɔtˈfina] is a village in the administrative district of Gmina Lipowa, within Żywiec County, Silesian Voivodeship, in southern Poland.
