= Koszarawa =

- Village
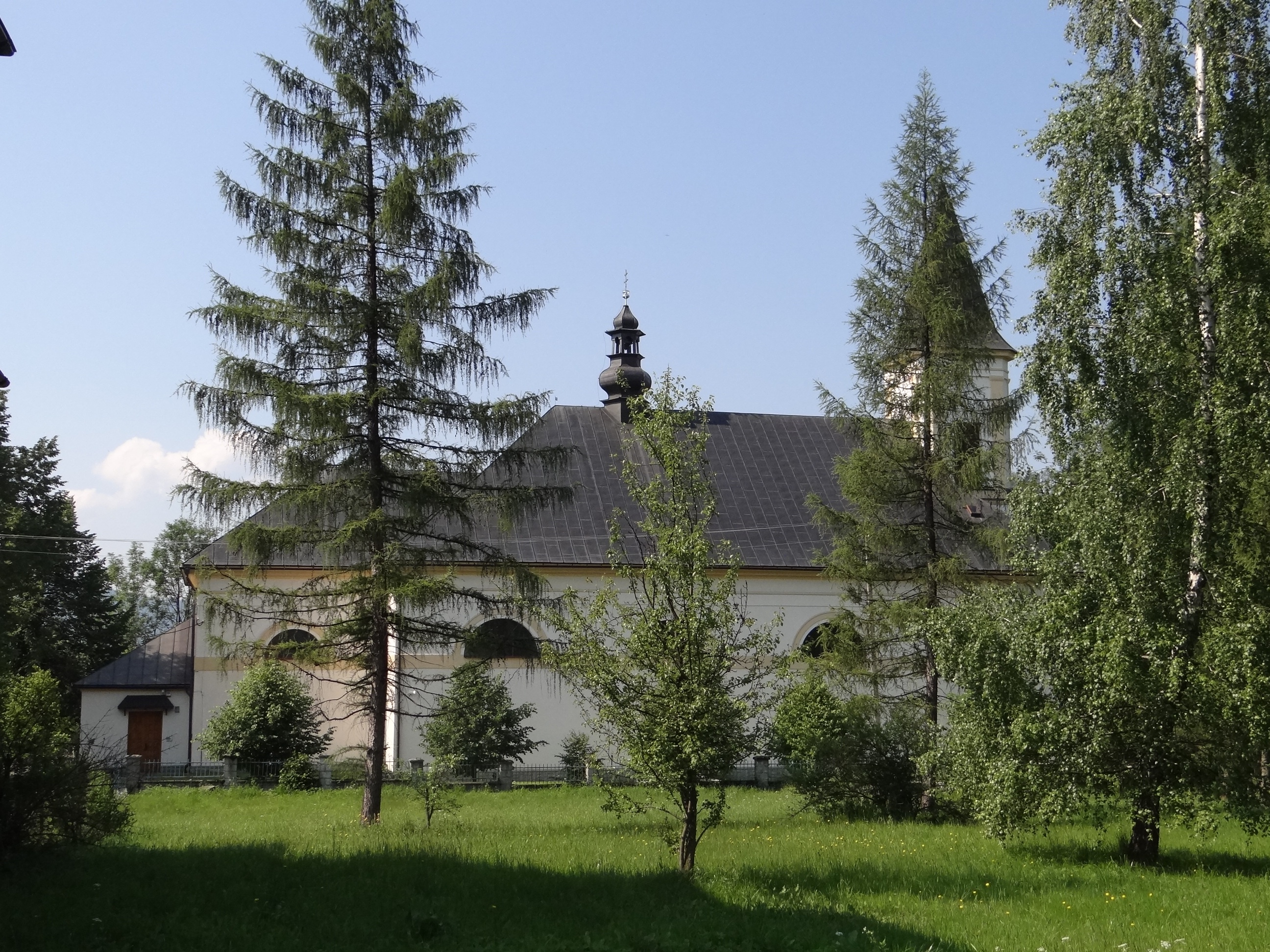
- Church

- Location within Poland
- Coordinates: 49°38′58″N 19°24′13″E
- Country: Poland
- Voivodeship: Silesian
- County: Żywiec
- Gmina: Koszarawa
- Population: 2,538

Koszarawa [kɔʂaˈrava] is a village in Żywiec County, Silesian Voivodeship, in southern Poland, close to the border with Slovakia. It is the seat of the gmina (administrative district) called Gmina Koszarawa. It lies in historic Lesser Poland, approximately 15 kilometres (9 mi) east of Żywiec, and 73 km (45 mi) south-east of the regional capital, Katowice.

Part of the village forms the separate sołectwo of Koszarawa Bystra.
