= Gmina Łękawica =

Gmina Łękawica Łękawica Commune
- Gmina
- Coat of arms

- Coordinates (Łękawica): 49°43′0″N 19°15′57″E
- Country: Poland
- Voivodeship: Silesian
- County: Żywiec
- Seat: Łękawica

Area
  - Total: 42.23 km^{2} (16.31 sq mi)

Population (2019-06-30)
  - Total: 4,557
  - Density: 107.9/km^{2} (279.5/sq mi)
- Website: http://www.lekawica.com.pl

Gmina Łękawica is a rural gmina (administrative district) in Żywiec County, Silesian Voivodeship, in southern Poland. Its seat is the village of Łękawica, which lies approximately 6 kilometres (4 mi) north-east of Żywiec and 63 km (39 mi) south of the regional capital Katowice.

The gmina covers an area of 42.23 square kilometres (16.3 sq mi), and as of 2019 its total population is 4,557.

== Villages ==
Gmina Łękawica contains the villages and settlements of Kocierz Moszczanicki, Kocierz Rychwałdzki, Łękawica, Łysina and Okrajnik.

== Neighbouring gminas ==
Gmina Łękawica is bordered by the town of Żywiec and by the gminas of Andrychów, Czernichów, Gilowice, Porąbka and Ślemień.
