= Gmina Ujsoły =

Gmina Ujsoły Ujsoły Commune
- Gmina
- Coat of arms

- Coordinates (Ujsoły): 49°28′N 19°8′E
- Country: Poland
- Voivodeship: Silesian
- County: Żywiec
- Seat: Ujsoły

Area
  - Total: 109.95 km^{2} (42.45 sq mi)

Population (2019-06-30)
  - Total: 4,466
  - Density: 40.62/km^{2} (105.2/sq mi)
- Website: http://www.ujsoly.com.pl

Gmina Ujsoły is a rural gmina (administrative district) in Żywiec County, Silesian Voivodeship, in southern Poland, on the Slovak border. Its seat is the village of Ujsoły, which lies approximately 26 kilometres (16 mi) south of Żywiec and 88 km (55 mi) south of the regional capital Katowice.

The gmina covers an area of 109.95 square kilometres (42.5 sq mi), and as of 2019 its total population is 4,466.

== Villages ==
Gmina Ujsoły contains the villages and settlements of Cicha, Danielka, Glinka, Herdula, Kotrysia Polana, Kręcichłosty, Młada Hora, Okrągłe, Smereków Wielki, Soblówka, Stawiska, Szczytkówka, Ujsoły and Złatna.

== Neighbouring gminas ==
Gmina Ujsoły is bordered by the gminas of Jeleśnia, Milówka, Rajcza and Węgierska Górka. It also borders Slovakia.
