= Pewel Mała =

- Village
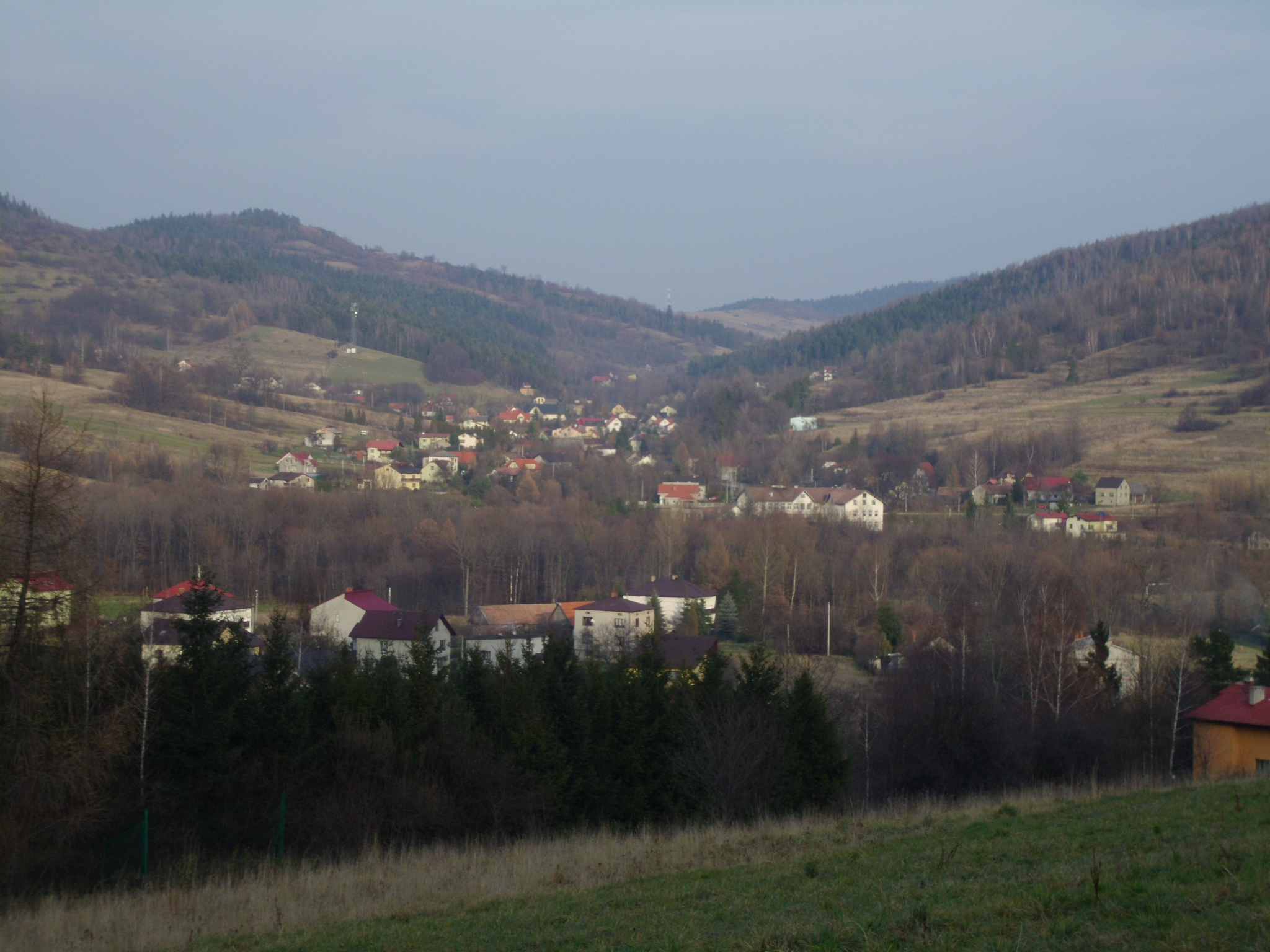

- Location within Poland
- Coordinates: 49°40′N 19°16′E
- Country: Poland
- Voivodeship: Silesian
- County: Żywiec
- Gmina: Świnna
- Population: 1,458

Pewel Mała [ˈpɛvɛl ˈmawa] is a village in the administrative district of Gmina Świnna, within Żywiec County, Silesian Voivodeship, in southern Poland.
