= Gmina Łodygowice =

Gmina Łodygowice Łodygowice Commune
- Gmina
- Coat of arms

- Coordinates (Łodygowice): 49°43′20″N 19°8′57″E
- Country: Poland
- Voivodeship: Silesian
- County: Żywiec
- Seat: Łodygowice

Area
  - Total: 35.2 km^{2} (13.6 sq mi)

Population (2019-06-30)
  - Total: 14,495
  - Density: 412/km^{2} (1,070/sq mi)
- Website: http://www.lodygowice.pl/

Gmina Łodygowice is a rural gmina (administrative district) in Żywiec County, Silesian Voivodeship, in southern Poland. Its seat is the village of Łodygowice, which lies approximately 6 kilometres (4 mi) north-west of Żywiec and 60 km (37 mi) south of the regional capital Katowice.

The gmina covers an area of 35.2 square kilometres (13.6 sq mi), and as of 2019 its total population is 14,495.

== Villages ==
Gmina Łodygowice contains the villages and settlements of Bierna, Łodygowice, Pietrzykowice and Zarzecze.

== Neighbouring gminas ==
Gmina Łodygowice is bordered by the town of Żywiec and by the gminas of Buczkowice, Czernichów, Lipowa and Wilkowice.

== Twin towns – sister cities ==
Gmina Łodygowice is twinned with:

- Gogolin, Poland
- Kysucké Nové Mesto, Slovakia
