= Wieprz, Silesian Voivodeship =

Wieprz
- Village
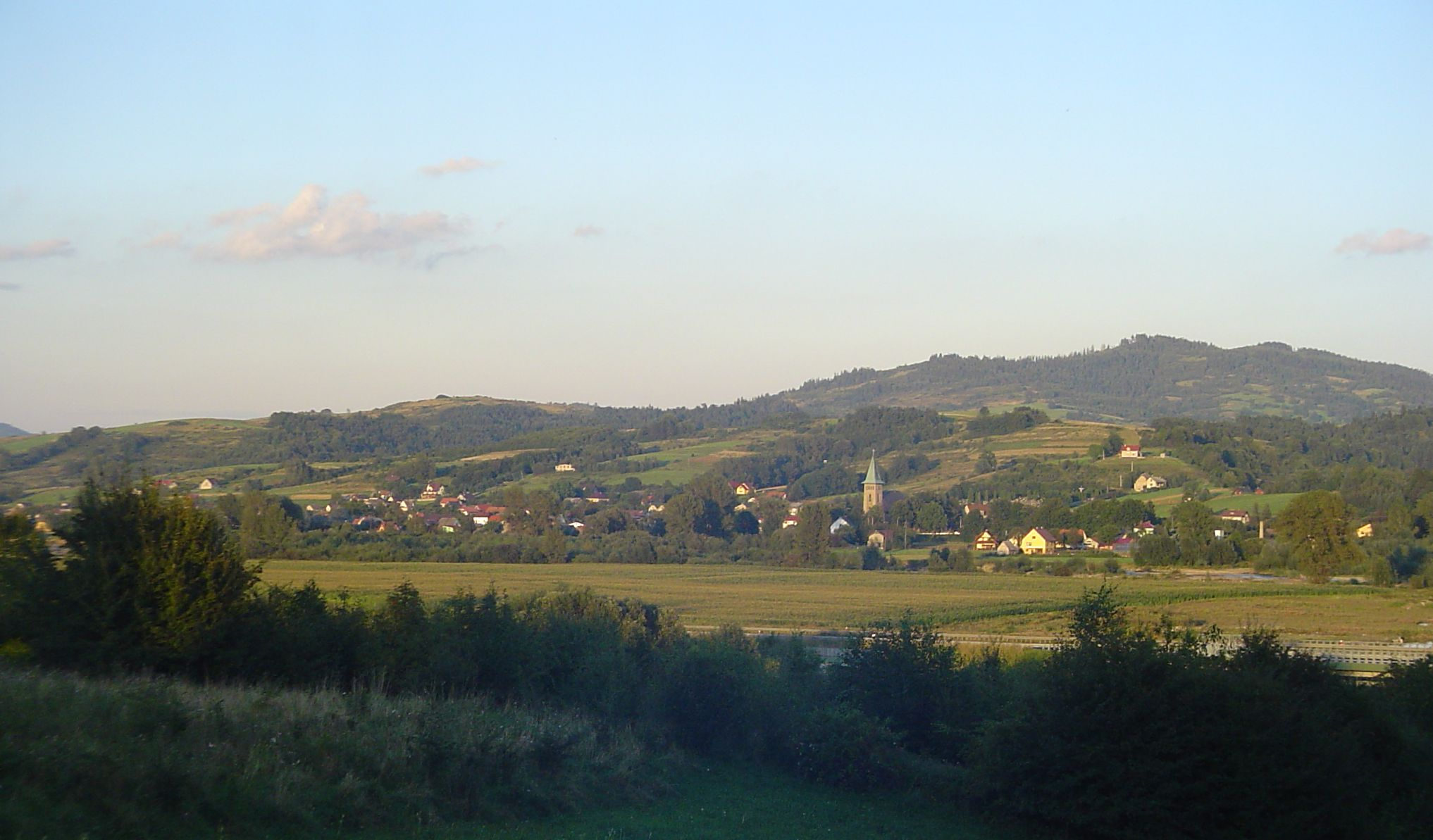
- General view of the village

- Location within Poland
- Coordinates: 49°38′17″N 19°10′28″E
- Country: Poland
- Voivodeship: Silesian
- County: Żywiec
- Gmina: Radziechowy-Wieprz
- Population: 3,535

Wieprz (Polish: [ˈvjɛpʂ], lit. '"Boar"') is a village in Żywiec County, Silesian Voivodeship, in southern Poland. It is the seat of the gmina (administrative district) called Gmina Radziechowy-Wieprz.

It is one of the oldest villages in Żywiec Basin. It was first mentioned in Liber beneficiorum (1470-1480) as Wyeprze Maior and Wyeprze Minor.
