= Lipowa, Silesian Voivodeship =

Lipowa
- Village
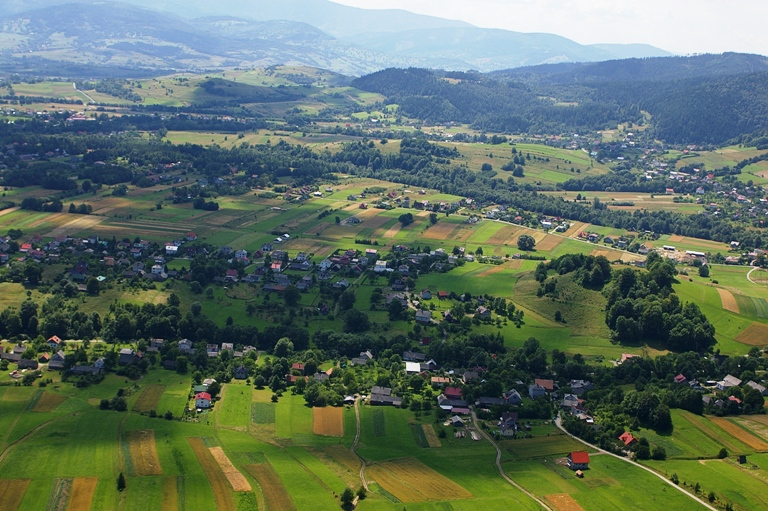
- Aerial view

- Location within Poland
- Coordinates: 49°40′44″N 19°6′14″E
- Country: Poland
- Voivodeship: Silesian
- County: Żywiec
- Gmina: Lipowa
- Established: late 13th century
- Population: 4,322

Lipowa [liˈpɔva] is a village in Żywiec County, Silesian Voivodeship, in southern Poland. It is the seat of the gmina (administrative district) called Gmina Lipowa.

It is one of the oldest villages in Żywiec Basin. It was established in the late 13th century, and soon it became a seat of a Catholic parish.
