= Gmina Koszarawa =

Gmina Koszarawa Koszarawa Commune
- Gmina
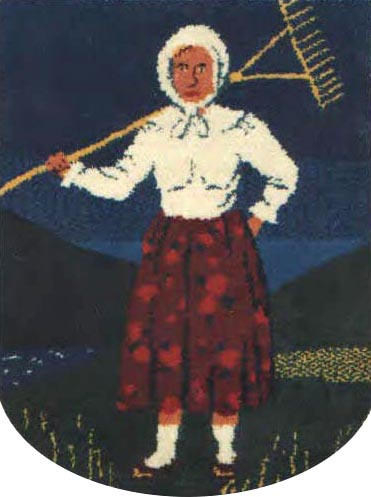
- Coat of arms

- Coordinates (Koszarawa): 49°38′58″N 19°24′13″E
- Country: Poland
- Voivodeship: Silesian
- County: Żywiec
- Seat: Koszarawa

Area
  - Total: 31.24 km^{2} (12.06 sq mi)

Population (2019-06-30)
  - Total: 2,388
  - Density: 76.44/km^{2} (198.0/sq mi)
- Website: http://www.gminakoszarawa.pl/

Gmina Koszarawa is a rural gmina (administrative district) in Żywiec County, Silesian Voivodeship, in southern Poland, on the Slovak border. Its seat is the village of Koszarawa, part of which forms a separate sołectwo called Koszarawa Bystra.

The gmina covers an area of 31.24 square kilometres (12.1 sq mi), and as of 2019 its total population is 2,388.

== Neighbouring gminas ==
Gmina Koszarawa is bordered by the gminas of Jeleśnia, Stryszawa and Zawoja. It also borders Slovakia.
