= Gmina Lipowa =

Gmina Lipowa Lipowa Commune
- Gmina
- Flag Coat of arms

- Coordinates (Lipowa): 49°40′44″N 19°6′14″E
- Country: Poland
- Voivodeship: Silesian
- County: Żywiec
- Seat: Lipowa

Area
  - Total: 58.08 km^{2} (22.42 sq mi)

Population (2019-06-30)
  - Total: 10,803
  - Density: 186.0/km^{2} (481.7/sq mi)
- Website: http://www.lipowa.pl/

Gmina Lipowa is a rural gmina (administrative district) in Żywiec County, Silesian Voivodeship, in southern Poland. Its seat is the village of Lipowa, which lies approximately 8 kilometres (5 mi) west of Żywiec and 64 km (40 mi) south of the regional capital Katowice.

The gmina covers an area of 58.08 square kilometres (22.4 sq mi), and as of 2019 its total population is 10,803.

== Villages ==
Gmina Lipowa contains the villages and settlements of Leśna, Lipowa, Ostre, Sienna, Słotwina and Twardorzeczka.

== Neighbouring gminas ==
Gmina Lipowa is bordered by the towns of Szczyrk, Wisła and Żywiec, and by the gminas of Buczkowice, Łodygowice and Radziechowy-Wieprz.

== Twin towns – sister cities ==
Gmina Lipowa is twinned with:

- Oščadnica, Slovakia
- Raková, Slovakia
- Stará Ves nad Ondřejnicí, Czech Republic
