= Gmina Radziechowy-Wieprz =

Gmina Radziechowy-Wieprz Radziechowy-Wieprz Commune
- Gmina
- Coat of arms

- Coordinates (Wieprz): 49°38′17″N 19°10′28″E
- Country: Poland
- Voivodeship: Silesian
- County: Żywiec
- Seat: Wieprz

Area
  - Total: 65.94 km^{2} (25.46 sq mi)

Population (2019-06-30)
  - Total: 13,105
  - Density: 198.7/km^{2} (514.7/sq mi)
- Website: http://www.radziechowy-wieprz.pl/

Gmina Radziechowy-Wieprz is a rural gmina (administrative district) in Żywiec County, Silesian Voivodeship, in southern Poland. Its seat is the village of Wieprz, which lies approximately 7 kilometres (4 mi) south of Żywiec and 70 km (43 mi) south of the regional capital Katowice.

The gmina covers an area of 65.94 square kilometres (25.5 sq mi), and as of 2019 its total population is 13,105.

== Villages ==
Gmina Radziechowy-Wieprz contains the villages and settlements of Brzuśnik, Bystra, Juszczyna, Przybędza, Radziechowy and Wieprz.

== Neighbouring gminas ==
Gmina Radziechowy-Wieprz is bordered by the town of Żywiec and by the gminas of Jeleśnia, Lipowa, Milówka, Świnna and Węgierska Górka.
