= Gilowice, Żywiec County =

Gilowice
- Village
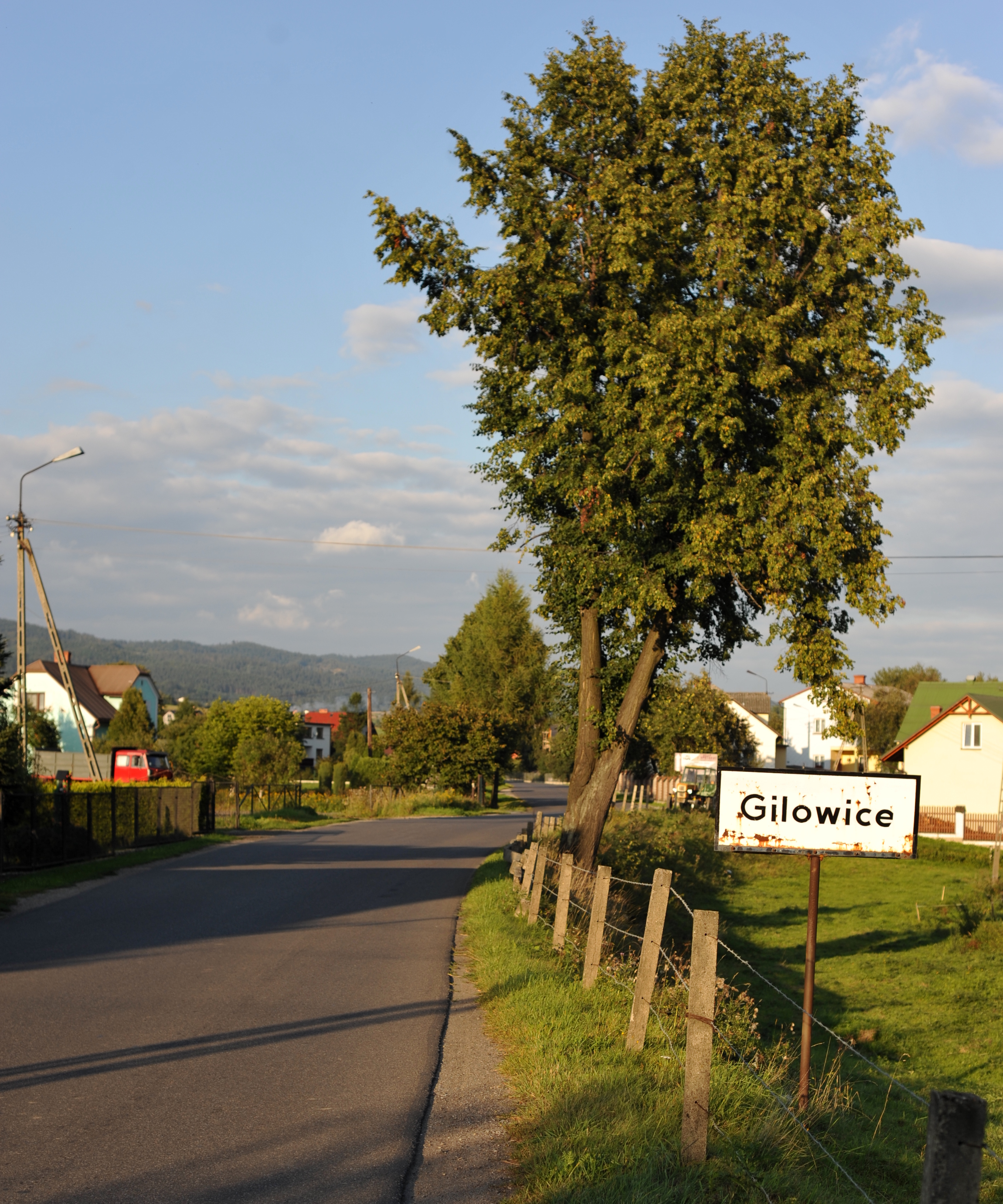
- Entering Gilowice

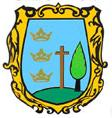
- Coat of arms

- Location within Poland
- Coordinates: 49°42′N 19°18′E
- Country: Poland
- Voivodeship: Silesian
- County: Żywiec
- Gmina: Gilowice
- First mentioned: 1326
- Population: 4,259
- Website: http://gilowice.pl/

Gilowice [ɡilɔˈvit͡sɛ] is a village in Żywiec County, Silesian Voivodeship, in southern Poland. It is the seat of the gmina (administrative district) called Gmina Gilowice.

== History ==
The village was first mentioned in 1326 in the register of Peter's Pence payment among Catholic parishes of Oświęcim deaconry of the Diocese of Kraków under two names: Gigersdorf or Gerowicz.

Politically the village belonged then to the Duchy of Oświęcim, formed in 1315 in the process of feudal fragmentation of Poland and was ruled by a local branch of Piast dynasty. In 1327 the duchy became a fee of Kingdom of Bohemia, which was in 1457 purchased to the Polish Crown, but earlier in obscure circumstances the area around Żywiec was excluded from the Duchy of Oświęcim and formed a private latifundium. Upon the First Partition of Poland in 1772 it became part of the Austrian Kingdom of Galicia. After World War I, fall of Austria-Hungary it became a part of Poland. It was annexed by Nazi Germany at the beginning of World War II, and afterwards was restored to Poland.
