= Okrajnik =

- Village
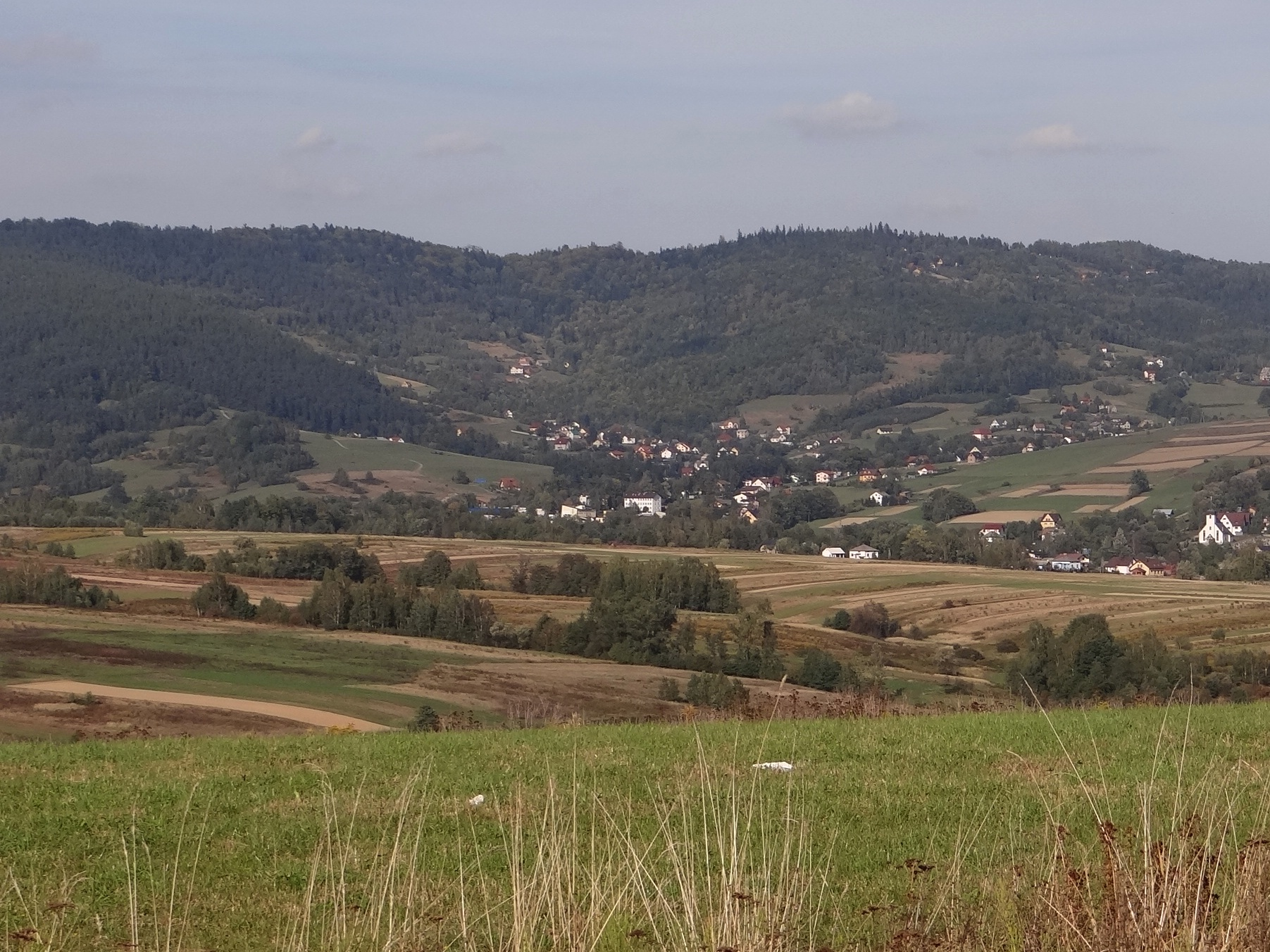

- Location within Poland
- Coordinates: 49°44′N 19°16′E
- Country: Poland
- Voivodeship: Silesian
- County: Żywiec
- Gmina: Łękawica
- Highest elevation: 580 m (1,900 ft)
- Lowest elevation: 430 m (1,410 ft)
- Population: 741

Okrajnik [ɔˈkrai̯nik] is a village in the administrative district of Gmina Łękawica, within Żywiec County, Silesian Voivodeship, in southern Poland.
