= Gmina Gilowice =

Gmina Gilowice Gilowice Commune
- Gmina
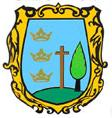
- Coat of arms

- Coordinates (Gilowice): 49°42′N 19°18′E
- Country: Poland
- Voivodeship: Silesian
- County: Żywiec
- Seat: Gilowice

Area
  - Total: 28.15 km^{2} (10.87 sq mi)

Population (2019-06-30)
  - Total: 6,242
  - Density: 221.7/km^{2} (574.3/sq mi)
- Website: http://www.gilowice.pl/

Gmina Gilowice is a rural gmina (administrative district) in Żywiec County, Silesian Voivodeship, in southern Poland. Its seat is the village of Gilowice, which lies approximately 7 kilometres (4 mi) east of Żywiec and 65 km (40 mi) south of the regional capital Katowice. Its only other village having sołectwo status is Rychwałd.

The gmina covers an area of 28.15 square kilometres (10.9 sq mi), and as of 2019 its total population is 6,242.

== Neighbouring gminas ==
Gmina Gilowice is bordered by the town of Żywiec and by the gminas of Łękawica, Ślemień and Świnna.

== Twin towns – sister cities ==
Gmina Gilowice is twinned with:

- Uhrovec, Slovakia
