= Ujsoły =

- Village
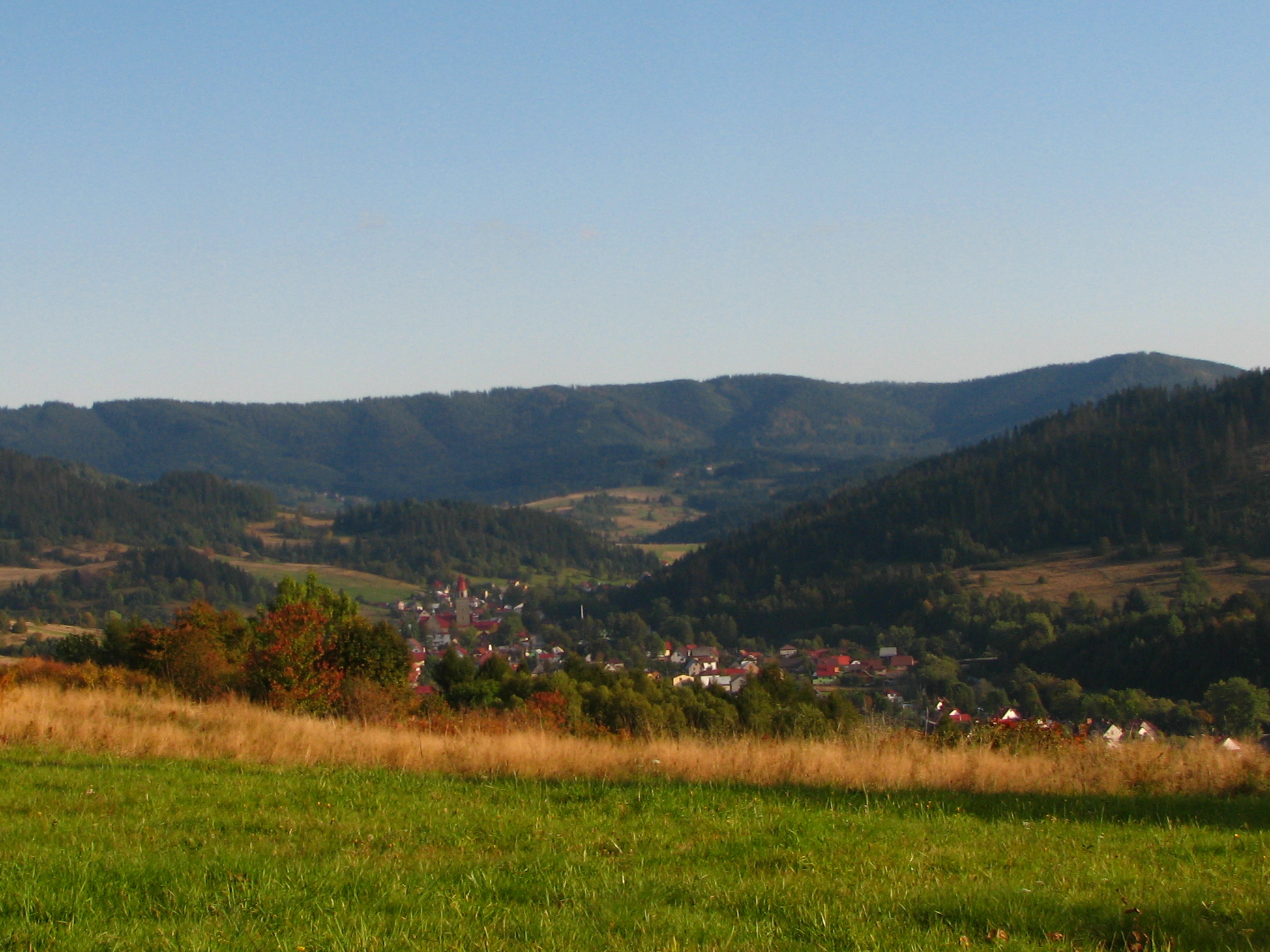
- Ujsoły

- Location within Poland
- Coordinates: 49°28′N 19°8′E
- Country: Poland
- Voivodeship: Silesian
- County: Żywiec
- Gmina: Ujsoły
- Population: 2,392
- Website: https://ujsoly.com.pl/

Ujsoły [ui̯ˈsɔwɨ] is a village in Żywiec County, Silesian Voivodeship, in southern Poland, close to the border with Slovakia. It is the seat of the gmina (administrative district) called Gmina Ujsoły.
