= Gmina Świnna =

Gmina Świnna Świnna Commune
- Gmina
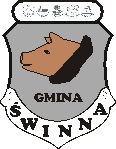
- Coat of arms

- Coordinates (Świnna): 49°39′N 19°15′E
- Country: Poland
- Voivodeship: Silesian
- County: Żywiec
- Seat: Świnna

Area
  - Total: 39.4 km^{2} (15.2 sq mi)

Population (2019-06-30)
  - Total: 8,084
  - Density: 205/km^{2} (531/sq mi)
- Website: http://www.swinna.pl/

Gmina Świnna is a rural gmina (administrative district) in Żywiec County, Silesian Voivodeship, in southern Poland. Its seat is the village of Świnna, which lies approximately 6 kilometres (4 mi) south-east of Żywiec and 69 km (43 mi) south of the regional capital Katowice.

The gmina covers an area of 39.4 square kilometres (15.2 sq mi), and as of 2019 its total population is 8,084.

== Villages ==
Gmina Świnna contains the villages and settlements of Pewel Mała, Pewel Ślemieńska, Przyłęków, Rychwałdek, Świnna and Trzebinia.

== Neighbouring gminas ==
Gmina Świnna is bordered by the town of Żywiec and by the gminas of Gilowice, Jeleśnia, Radziechowy-Wieprz and Ślemień.
