= Gmina Węgierska Górka =

Gmina Węgierska Górka Węgierska Górka Commune
- Gmina
- Flag Coat of arms

- Coordinates (Węgierska Górka): 49°36′N 19°8′E
- Country: Poland
- Voivodeship: Silesian
- County: Żywiec
- Seat: Węgierska Górka

Area
  - Total: 77.06 km^{2} (29.75 sq mi)

Population (2019-06-30)
  - Total: 15,073
  - Density: 195.6/km^{2} (506.6/sq mi)
- Website: http://www.wegierska-gorka.pl/

Gmina Węgierska Górka is a rural gmina (administrative district) in Żywiec County, Silesian Voivodeship, in southern Poland. Its seat is the village of Węgierska Górka, which lies approximately 12 kilometres (7 mi) south-west of Żywiec and 73 km (45 mi) south of the regional capital Katowice.

The gmina covers an area of 77.06 square kilometres (29.8 sq mi), and as of 2019 its total population is 15,073.

== Villages ==
Gmina Węgierska Górka contains the villages and settlements of Cięcina, Cisiec, Węgierska Górka and Żabnica.

== Neighbouring gminas ==
Gmina Węgierska Górka is bordered by the gminas of Jeleśnia, Milówka, Radziechowy-Wieprz and Ujsoły.

== Twin towns – sister cities ==
Gmina Węgierska Górka is twinned with:

- Lengyeltóti, Hungary
- Pákozd, Hungary

== See also ==
- Battle of Węgierska Górka
