= Łękawica, Silesian Voivodeship =

Łękawica
- Village
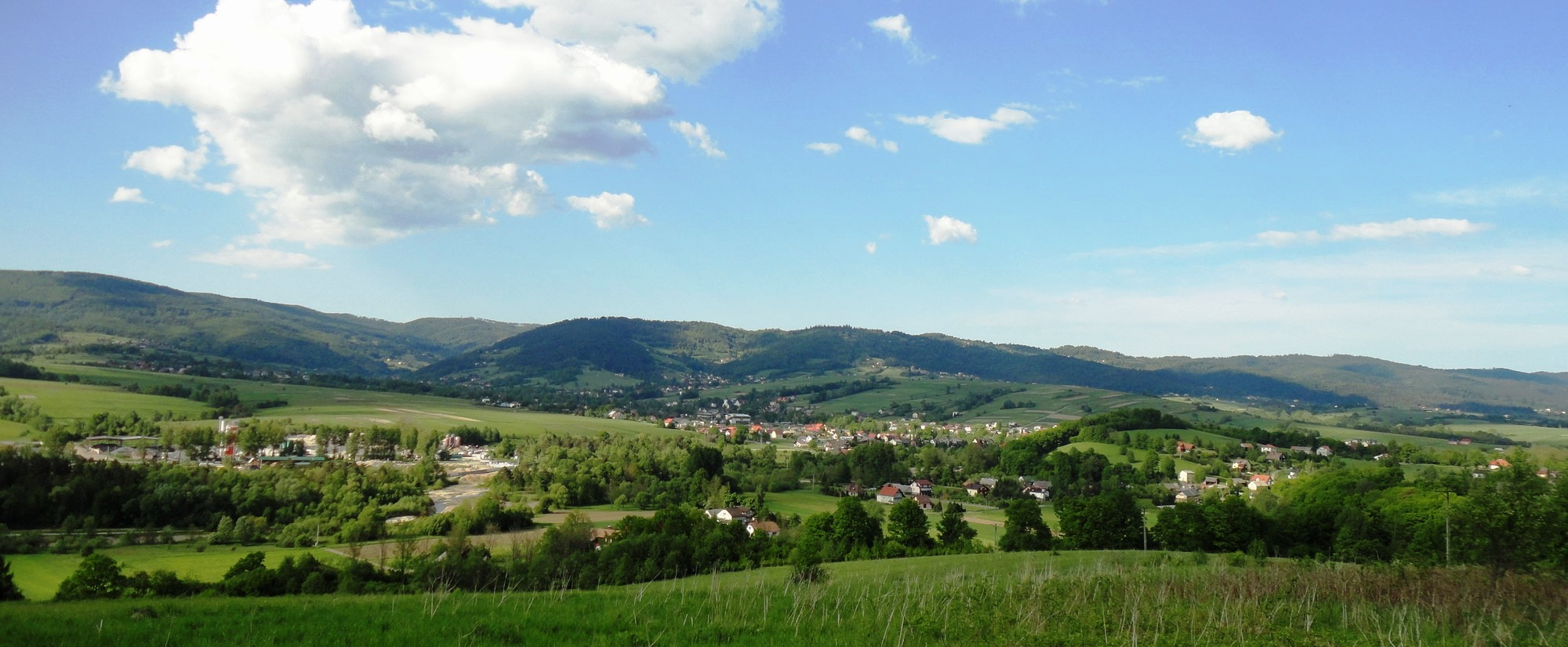
- Panorama of Łękawica

- Location within Poland
- Coordinates: 49°42′N 19°15′E
- Country: Poland
- Voivodeship: Silesian
- County: Żywiec
- Gmina: Łękawica
- Highest elevation: 430 m (1,410 ft)
- Lowest elevation: 370 m (1,210 ft)

Population
  - Total: 2,169
- Website: http://www.lekawica.com.pl/

Łękawica [wɛnkaˈvit͡sa] is a village in Żywiec County, Silesian Voivodeship, in southern Poland. It is the seat of the gmina (administrative district) called Gmina Łękawica.
