= Żywiec County =

Żywiec County Powiat żywiecki
- County
- Coat of arms

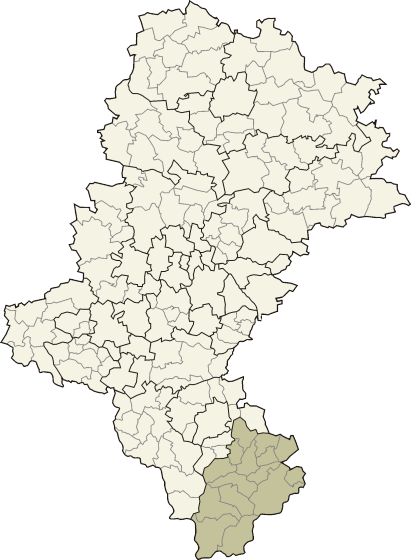
- Location within Silesian Voivodeship
- Coordinates (Żywiec): 49°41′21″N 19°12′21″E
- Country: Poland
- Voivodeship: Silesian
- Seat: Żywiec
- Gminas: Total 15 (incl. 1 urban): Żywiec; Gmina Czernichów; Gmina Gilowice; Gmina Jeleśnia; Gmina Koszarawa; Gmina Łękawica; Gmina Lipowa; Gmina Łodygowice; Gmina Milówka; Gmina Radziechowy-Wieprz; Gmina Rajcza; Gmina Ślemień; Gmina Świnna; Gmina Ujsoły; Gmina Węgierska Górka

Area
  - Total: 1,039.96 km^{2} (401.53 sq mi)

Population (2019-06-30)
  - Total: 152,877
  - Density: 147.003/km^{2} (380.735/sq mi)
  - Urban: 31,194
  - Rural: 121,683
- Car plates: SZY
- Website: www.starostwo.zywiec.pl

Żywiec County (Polish: powiat żywiecki) is a unit of territorial administration and local government (powiat) in Silesian Voivodeship, southern Poland, on the Slovak border. It came into being on January 1, 1999, as a result of the Polish local government reforms passed in 1998. Its administrative seat and only town is Żywiec, which lies 64 kilometres (40 mi) south of the regional capital Katowice.

The county covers an area of 1,039.96 square kilometres (401.5 sq mi). As of 2019 its total population is 152,877, out of which the population of Żywiec is 31,194 and the rural population is 121,683.

The county includes part of the protected area known as Żywiec Landscape Park.

== Neighbouring counties ==
Żywiec County is bordered by Cieszyn County to the west, the city of Bielsko-Biała and Bielsko County to the north, Wadowice County to the north-east, and Sucha County to the east. It also borders Slovakia to the south.

== Administrative divisions ==
The county is subdivided into 15 gminas (one urban and 14 rural). These are listed in the following table, in descending order of population.

Gmina	Type	Area (km^{2})	Population (2019)	Seat
Żywiec	urban	50.6	31,194	
Gmina Węgierska Górka	rural	77.1	15,073	Węgierska Górka
Gmina Łodygowice	rural	35.2	14,495	Łodygowice
Gmina Jeleśnia	rural	170.5	13,283	Jeleśnia
Gmina Radziechowy-Wieprz	rural	65.9	13,105	Wieprz
Gmina Lipowa	rural	58.1	10,803	Lipowa
Gmina Milówka	rural	98.3	10,052	Milówka
Gmina Rajcza	rural	131.2	8,835	Rajcza
Gmina Świnna	rural	39.4	8,084	Świnna
Gmina Czernichów	rural	56.3	6,774	Czernichów
Gmina Gilowice	rural	28.2	6,242	Gilowice
Gmina Łękawica	rural	42.2	4,557	Łękawica
Gmina Ujsoły	rural	110.0	4,466	Ujsoły
Gmina Ślemień	rural	45.9	3,526	Ślemień
Gmina Koszarawa	rural	31.2	2,388	Koszarawa
