= Oldenburg (state) =

Former state in Germany

Flag of the Grand Duchy of Oldenburg from 1871

Free State of Oldenburg in the German Reich in 1925

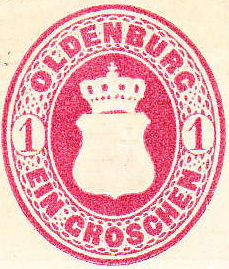
Historic Oldenburg postage stamp

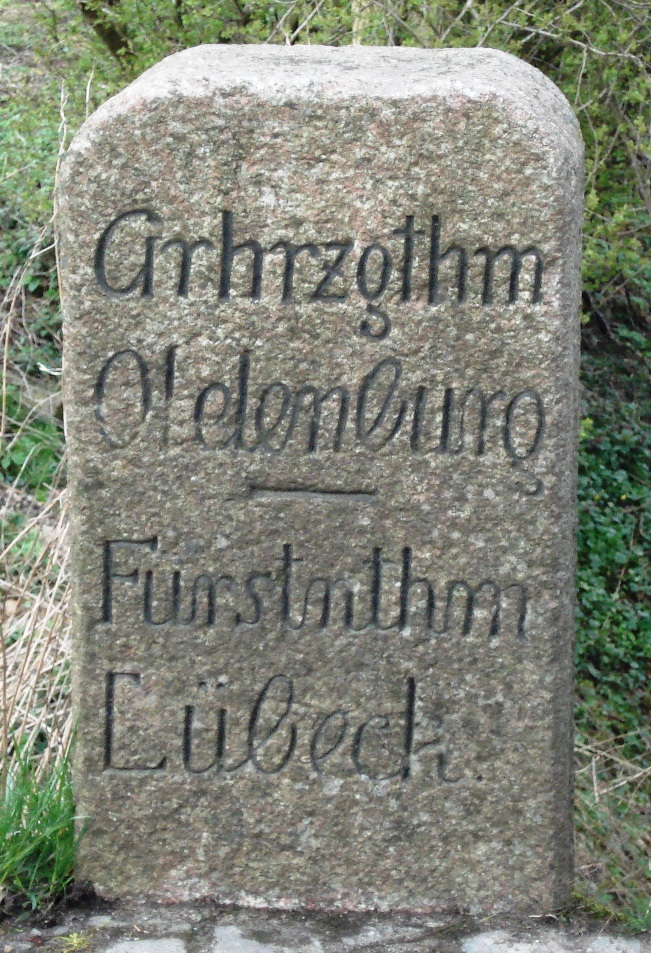
Grand Duchy of Oldenburg – border marker in Hassendorf

Oldenburg (German pronunciation: [ˈɔldn̩bʊʁk]) is a former state in northwestern Germany whose capital was Oldenburg. The County gained its independence in the High Middle Ages. Following a century of Danish rule and renewed independence as a duchy, it was annexed by the French Empire and emerged from the Napoleonic Wars as an independent grand duchy. As such it was part of the German Confederation, and was a member state of the German Reich from 1871 to 1946.

== Geography: Oldenburg Land ==
The Oldenburgish state has been joined to numerous distant exclaves over time. Additionally, the country was governed for a long time by Danish rulers. Oldenburg Land is used to designate in a narrower sense the northern, older part of the Grand Duchy, especially the territory of the old County of Oldenburg. The southern part of the country added in 1803 is called Oldenburg Münsterland. To this was added Landwürden, lying to the east of the Weser. In no case were the exclaves that belonged to Oldenburg until 1937 included under the name of Oldenburg Land, nor were the Principality of Lübeck, part of Oldenburg after 1773 (later Kreis Eutin, currently part of Ostholstein) or the Principality of Birkenfeld (part of Oldenburg after 1817, belonging to the Nahe region).

== History ==
=== County of Oldenburg (1108–1774) ===
In the Holy Roman Empire Oldenburg was a county that developed around the settlement of Oldenburg, (first attested in 1108) and in the course of history gained control of a wider area. The Counts of Oldenburg stemmed from a Frisian princely house. At first vassals of the Welf Saxon prince Henry the Lion, they took advantage of his deposition by Emperor Barbarossa to make themselves autonomous. The first Oldenburgs belonged to the line of the Rüstringen Frisians. In 1234 the county was acquired by the also Frisian Stedingens, later by other Frisian territories (Butjadingen, Rüstringen, Wurden) and finally in 1575 came into the possession of the Lordship of Jever. Oldenburg gained importance when Count Dietrich of Oldenburg († 1440) married Hedvig of Holstein, daughter of Gerhard VI of Schleswig-Holstein-Rendsburg. Dietrich's younger son carried on the line of Oldenburg counts, which died out in 1667. The elder son, Christian, was elected King Christian I of Denmark in 1448 and Lord of Schleswig and Holstein in 1460. In 1667 this line acquired Oldenburg as well, which thereby was joined in personal union with the Danish crown. The lordships of Jever and Kniphausen were not affected. The Lordship of Jever was willed by Anthony Günther, Count of Oldenburg to the Principality of Anhalt-Zerbst and in 1795 fell by Kunkellehen (female inheritance) to the Russian empress Catherine the Great.

=== Duchy of Oldenburg (1774–1810) ===
Through a territorial trade, the County of Oldenburg was assigned in the Treaty of Tsarskoye Selo on the 27th of August, 1773, to the head of the House of Holstein-Gottorp, the future Emperor Paul I of Russia, who four days later transferred the country to his cousin Frederick August, the Prince-bishop of Lübeck, who was then promoted by Emperor Joseph II to the rank of duke in 1774/1777. The duchy thus consisted of two geographically separate parts: Oldenburg proper and the Prince-bishopric of Lübeck with the Residenz of Eutin. In 1785 Frederick August died. His nephew Peter Frederick Louis accepted the successorship and regency for Frederick August's mentally ill son Peter Frederick William as coadjutor. Under him Oldenburg again became a Residenz. In the Reichsdeputationshauptschluss of 1803 Oldenburg obtained the Hanoverian district of Wildeshausen and the districts of Vechta and Cloppenburg from the dissolved Prince-Bishopric of Münster in compensation for losing the Elsfleth Weser Toll (ship toll on the Weser levied by Oldenburg 1623 - 1820). The Prince-bishopric of Lübeck was transformed into a hereditary principality. Although it had joined the Confederation of the Rhine, it was annexed to France in 1810 by Napoleon Bonaparte. The Duke fled to his son George in Russia, who had married the Emperor's daughter Catherine Pavlovna.

=== Grand Duchy of Oldenburg (1814–1918) ===
In 1814, after the fall of Napoleon, the Duke returned to his country, which was raised to a grand duchy in 1815 after the Congress of Vienna. Furthermore, Oldenburg received a new exclave, the Principality of Birkenfeld on the Nahe, so that the national territory now comprised three parts. In 1818 Oldenburg received the Lordship of Jever back from Emperor Alexander I of Russia. After Peter Frederick Louis's death in 1829 his son Paul Frederick August succeeded him and became the first to call himself Grand Duke. On the 28th of February, 1849, in the context of the German Revolution, the Fundamental Law of the State, the first Oldenburgish constitution, came into force. It was revised as soon as 1852. In 1853 Nicholas Frederick Peter became Grand Duke of Oldenburg. Under his rule the Lordship of In- and Kniphausen was regained.

Oldenburg joined the Steuerverein (Tax Union) in 1836, which was a customs union with the Kingdom of Hanover and others. Hanover joined the Deutscher Zollverein (German Customs Union) in 1854, after negotiating advantageous conditions with Prussia and, facing isolation, Oldenburg followed suit the same year. In the Second Schleswig War of 1864 Oldenburg remained neutral. In the Austro-Prussian War of 1866 Oldenburgish troops fought on the side of Prussia against Austria, joining the Prussian dominated North German Confederation in 1867. In the course of Oldenburg's accession to the North German Confederation, a military convention of July 15, 1867 transferred the Oldenburg armed forces to the Prussian army and consequently, Oldenburg's military participated on the Prussian side in the Franco-Prussian War of 1870/1871.

After a reign of 47 years, Nicholas Frederick Peter died in 1900. His son Frederick August succeeded him as the last Grand Duke of Oldenburg.

=== Free State of Oldenburg (1918–1946) ===
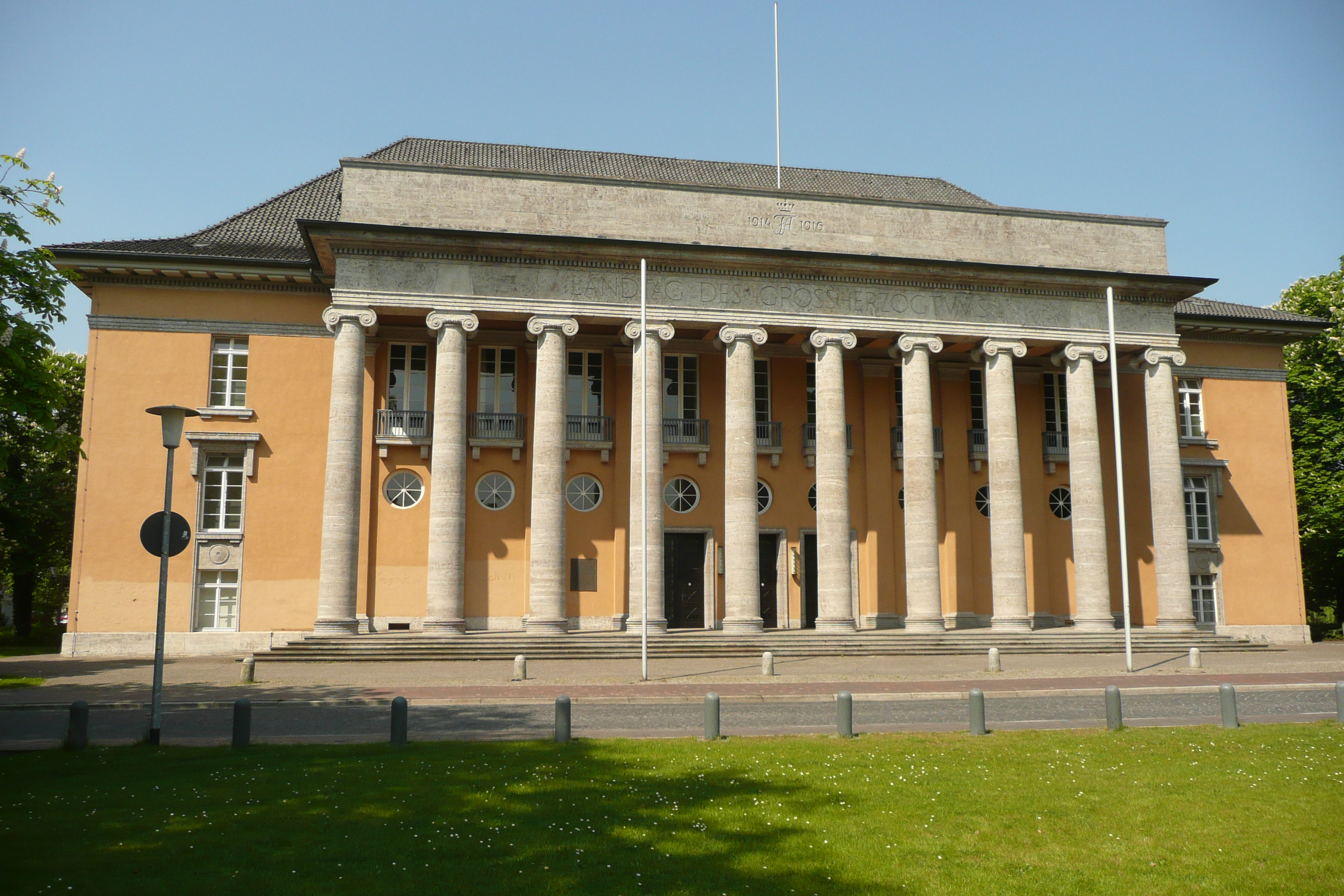
Oldenburg state parliament

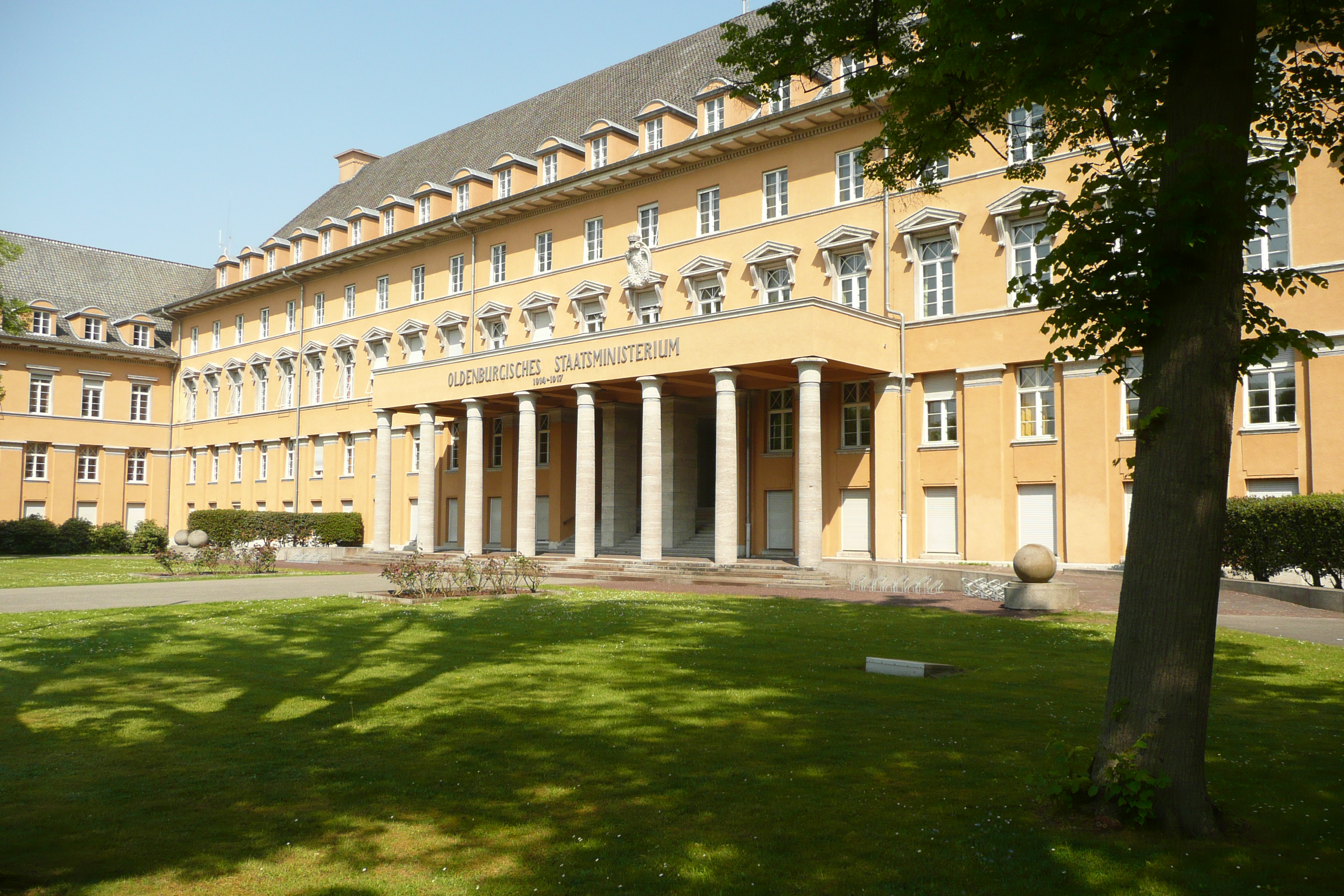
Former Oldenburg Ministry of State, from 1946 to 2004 the office of the local president

After World War I and the abdication of Grand Duke Frederick August, Oldenburg became a republic. It remained a state of the German Reich under the name Free State of Oldenburg. However, democracy lasted for only a short time. Already in the state parliamentary elections of 1931 the NSDAP became the strongest faction and in 1932 gained the state presidency as part of a coalition government. In the following years the Free State was Nazified. With the British military government's Ordinance No. 46 on the 23rd of August, 1946, titled "Abolition of the Provinces in the British Zone of the Former State of Prussia and the Reconstitution Thereof as Separate Länder" Oldenburg was joined with the State of Hanover as Verwaltungsbezirk (Administrative District) Oldenburg to create Lower Saxony.

=== Attempts to restore statehood ===
In non-binding referendums in 1956 and on 19 January 1975, citizens in Oldenburg voted to become a separate state from Lower Saxony. However, the Bundestag passed a law on 9 January 1976 refusing to restore the state of Oldenburg. The population of the former Oldenburg state (874,600 in 1977) is greater than the existing state of Bremen (706,500) and slightly less than the state of Saarland (1,085,600).

== Current situation ==
The Oldenburgische Landschaft is responsible for the cultural heritage of Oldenburg Land (including Oldenburg Münsterland). The history of the state of Oldenburg is displayed in Schloss Oldenburg and other museums.

The territory of the former state of Oldenburg is presently divided among five federal states:

- Lower Saxony:
  - Landkreis Oldenburg, except Samtgemeinde Harpstedt
  - Landkreis Ammerland
  - Landkreis Cloppenburg
  - Landkreis Vechta
  - Landkreis Friesland
  - Landkreis Wesermarsch
  - Landkreis Cuxhaven (Gemeinde Landwürden)
  - Landkreis Diepholz (Gemeinde Stuhr)
  - Landkreis Leer (Ortsteil Idafehn der Gemeinde Ostrhauderfehn)
  - kreisfreie Stadt Oldenburg
  - kreisfreie Stadt Delmenhorst
  - kreisfreie Stadt Wilhelmshaven
- Schleswig-Holstein:
  - Kreis Ostholstein (only Altkreis Eutin)
- Bremen
  - Bremerhaven (Luneplate, since its redefinition at the end of 2009)
- Rheinland-Pfalz:
  - Landkreis Birkenfeld (central part, especially Idar-Oberstein and Birkenfeld (Nahe))
- Saarland:
  - Landkreis St. Wendel (part of Nohfelden)

== Coat of arms, colours and anthem ==
In the nineteenth century the following coat of arms was adopted: A quartered shield, above divided, below divided by an upward point. In the first field are two red crossbars in gold (Oldenburg), in the second in blue a suspended golden cross (Delmenhorst), in the third in a blue field a suspended golden cross covered with a bishop's miter (Principality of Lübeck), in the fourth a red and white checkered field (Birkenfeld), in the point in a blue field a golden, crowned lion (Jever).

The state colours were blue and red, the flag blue with a red cross.

"Heil Dir, O Oldenburg" is the national anthem of the former Grand Duchy and, from 1918, of the Free State of Oldenburg.

== Bibliography ==
- Oldenburgische Bibliographie (16. Jahrhundert bis 1907). In der Landesbibliothek Oldenburg bearbeitet von Egbert Koolman. Lax, Hildesheim 1987 (Veröffentlichungen der Historischen Kommission für Niedersachsen und Bremen, Bd. XXXa).
- Geschichte des Landes Oldenburg e. Handbuch. Albrecht Eckhardt. Oldenburg. 1987. ISBN 978-3-87358-285-9. OCLC 242198803.
- Biographisches Handbuch zur Geschichte des Landes Oldenburg. Hans Friedl, Oldenburgische Landschaft. Oldenburg: Isensee Verlag. 1992. ISBN 3-89442-135-5. OCLC 28928769.
- Wolfgang Günther: Das Land Oldenburg unter nationalsozialistischer Herrschaft. In: Oldenburger Jahrbuch, Bd. 85 (1985), S. 111–130 (online).
- Franz Hellbernd und Heinz Möller, Oldenburg, ein heimatkundliches Nachschlagewerk. Vechtaer Druckerei und Verlag GmbH, Vechta 1965.
- Paul Kollmann: Das Herzogthum Oldenburg in seiner wirthschaftlichen Entwickelung während der letzten vierzig Jahre auf statistischer Grundlage dargestellt. Stalling, Oldenburg 1893 (Digitalisat).
- Lübbing, Hermann (1971). Oldenburg. Historische Konturen. Festschrift zum 70. Geburtstag. Oldenburg: Holzberg. ISBN 3-87358-045-4. OCLC 251044.
- Horst Milde: Oldenburg in Niedersachsen. Einige Erinnerungen und Betrachtungen. Ein Beitrag zum 50jährigen Bestehen des Landes Niedersachsen. In: Oldenburger Jahrbuch, Bd. 96 (1996), S. 1–23 (online).
- Geschichte Niedersachsens. Hans Patze, Ernst Schubert, Christine van den Heuvel, Manfred von Boetticher, Stefan Brüdermann, Gerd Steinwascher. v. 3, pt. 2: Lax. 1998. ISBN 3-7848-3421-3. OCLC 4001454.
- Das Oldenburger Land ein starkes Stück Niedersachsen. Rainer Rheude, Peter Kreier, Oldenburgische Landschaft Körperschaft. Oldenburg. 2006. ISBN 978-3-89995-371-8. OCLC 180973527.
- Schwarting A. C.: Oldenburg unter Herzog Peter Friedrich Ludwig von 1785–1811. – Gerh. Stalling, Oldenburg, 1936. – 70 S.
- Georg Sello: Die territoriale Entwicklung des Herzogtums Oldenburg. Neudruck der Ausgabe Göttingen 1917, Wenner, Osnabrück 1975.
- Steinwascher, Gerd (2011). Die Oldenburger die Geschichte einer europäischen Dynastie. Stuttgart. ISBN 978-3-17-021061-5. OCLC 724754481.
- Vonderach, Andreas (2015). Kleine Geschichte des Landes Oldenburg. Florian Isensee GmbH. Oldenburg. ISBN 978-3-7308-1188-7. OCLC 922713744.
- Rolf-Harald Wippich: Oldenburg und Ostasien. Der Schiffs- und Handelsverkehr eines norddeutschen Kleinstaates im Chinesischen Meer in der Mitte des 19. Jahrhunderts. In: Jahrbuch für europäische Überseegeschichte, Bd. 4, 2004, S. 33–62, ISSN 1436-6371.
