= Nicole Seibert =

German singer

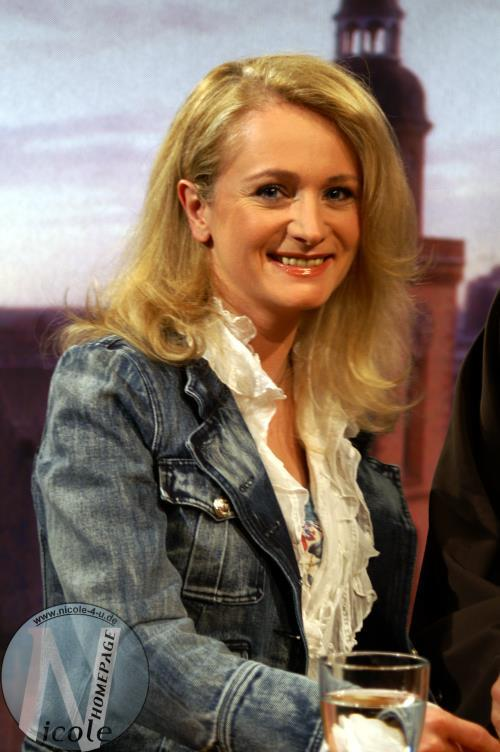
- Born: Nicole Hohloch; 25 October 1964 (age 61); Saarbrücken, Saarland, West Germany
- Other name: Nicole
- Notable work: "Ein bißchen Frieden" ("A Little Peace")
- Spouse: Winfried Seibert (m. 1984)
- Children: 2
- Musical career
- Genres: Schlager; pop; jazz; rock; gospel
- Occupations: singer; songwriter; musician; producer
- Instruments: Vocals; guitar; accordion; cajón
- Years active: 1980s–present
- Labels: CBS Records; Jupiter Records; Ariola; Telamo
- Website: www.nicole-4-u.de

Nicole Seibert (née Hohloch; born 25 October 1964), known professionally as Nicole, is a German singer, songwriter, musician and producer. In 1982, she became the first German representative to win the Eurovision Song Contest. She has released more than 25 studio albums and 80 singles, some of which she performed and recorded in, among other languages, English, Dutch, and French. She wrote the music and lyrics for some of her recordings.

== Life and career ==
Hohloch was born in Saarbrücken, Saarland, West Germany. She began performing at the age of four, but did not achieve commercial success until she was 16, when her first single ("Flieg nicht so hoch, mein kleiner Freund") was released. It peaked at #2 in Austria and reached Top 40 positions on multiple European music charts.

When she was 17, she won the Eurovision Song Contest 1982 with "Ein bißchen Frieden", which reached #1 on multiple European music charts. After the end of the contest's voting, Hohloch reprised the song by performing parts of it in English, French and Dutch, along with the original German.

Interviewed years later, she made a statement regarding the points received from Israel: "But the most important victory (was) that a German girl gets 12 points from Israel with a song about peace." In the interview, she also stated that she received an invitation from the Israeli government (which she accepted) to go to Tel Aviv to sing for soldiers stationed there.

She recorded an English version of "A Little Peace", which reached #1 on the UK Singles Chart. It went on to be the 500th number one single in the UK Singles Chart. Full versions in French ("La Paix sur Terre"), Dutch ("Een beetje vrede"), Spanish ("Un poco de paz"), Danish ("En smule fred"), Slovene ("Malo miru"), Russian ("Немного мира"), Polish ("Troszeczkę ziemi, troszeczkę słońca"), and Hungarian ("Egy kis nyugalmat kívánok én", with Neoton Família) have also been recorded.

Later in 1982, she released three studio albums, one German (Ein bißchen Frieden) and the other in English (A Little Peace) and Meine kleine Freiheit. Like the title tracks, most of the songs have corresponding German and English tracks.

In 2005 she co-produced her album Alles Fließt, which was released in May of that year. In 2008, she released the album Mitten ins Herz, which was accompanied by a three-month "unplugged" tour that ended in January 2009.

Early in her career, the songs she recorded and performed were primarily written by composers such as Ralph Siegel, Bernd Meinunger, Robert Jung, and Jean Frankfurter. For the recordings of songs in other languages, she's worked with, among others, Paul Greedus, Zack Laurence, Pierre Delano, and Jean-Paul Cara.

In 2016 she worked with Siegel and Meinunger when making her studio album Traumfänger, and Hohloch (as Seibert) is also credited with some of the compositions. In 2019, for the songs on her studio album 50 ist das neue 25, she worked with Heinz Rudolf Kunze, Jens Carstens, Martin Koppehele, Suna Koppehele, Gabi Koppehele, and Giorgio Koppehele, and is credited with songs from that album as well.

In 2020, Hohloch celebrated her 40th anniversary in the music industry with a concert tour; however, these dates were rescheduled due to the COVID-19 pandemic.

Mostly associated with being a Schlager musician, she has also recorded and released jazz, pop, rock and gospel songs.

== Personal life ==
Hohloch is one of four children, born to Marliese and Siegfried Hohloch. She grew up with her brother and two sisters in the small community of Nohfelden in Saarland. It was there that she attended school and graduated from high school. She is an honorary citizen of her hometown of Nohfelden.

Hohloch married Winfried Seibert (a childhood friend she had known since she was 14) in a civil ceremony on 17 August 1984; a day later they had a wedding ceremony in a church. They have two children and live at Neunkirchen, Nohfelden.

She likes to give concerts in churches because of the atmosphere and acoustics. Since she was a child, she has found answers in her spirituality and firmly believes that guardian angels will take care of her. This belief was reinforced by some events in her life. In one such instance, Hohloch had planned a trip for Thailand in the winter of 2004, around the time the tsunami struck, killing over 220,000 people. Due to strong recommendations from friends, she cancelled her trip to Thailand and went to South Africa instead.

She supports various humanitarian causes, such as child abuse prevention, and healthy activities for homeless children in the Philippines. She continues to campaign for Rett syndrome and for "life without chains". She has been to Africa twice for Welthungerhilfe.

== Honors and awards ==
- 1982: First place at the Eurovision Song Contest
- 1983: Second place at the World Popular Song Festival in Tokyo with the song "So viele Lieder sind in mir"
- 1991: Winner of the German Schlagerparade with the song "Ein leises Lied".
- 1993: Echo Award for Best Schlager Female Artist (of 1992)
- 1999: Saarland Order of Merit

== Discography ==
=== Studio albums ===
Year	Title	First published
1981	Flieg nicht so hoch, mein kleiner Freund	1981
1982	Ein bißchen Frieden	17 June 1982
1982	A Little Peace	October 1982
1982	Meine kleine Freiheit	Nov/Dec 1982
1983	So viele Lieder sind in mir	10 October 1983
1985	Gesichter der Liebe	1985
1986	Laß mich nicht allein	1986
1987	Moderne Piraten	1987
1988	So wie du	1988
1990	Für immer...für ewig...	1990
1991	Und ich denke schon wieder nur an dich	2 September 1991
1992	Wenn schon...denn schon	9 November 1992
1993	Mehr als nur zusammen schlafen gehn	4 October 1993
1994	Und ausserdem	24 October 1994
1996	Pur	3 June 1996
1998	Abrakadabra	20 April 1998
1999	Visionen	20 September 1999
2001	Kaleidoskop	2 April 2001
2002	Ich lieb dich	9 September 2002
2004	Für die Seele	3 May 2004
2005	Alles fließt	30 May 2005
2006	Begleite mich	24 March 2006
2008	Mitten ins Herz	8 February 2008
2009	Meine Nummer 1	19 June 2009
2012	Jetzt komm ich	16 March 2012
2013	Alles nur für Dich	10 May 2013
2014	Das ist mein Weg	24 October 2014
2016	Traumfänger	15 April 2016
2017	12 Punkte	14 April 2017
2019	50 ist das neue 25	11 October 2019

== See also ==
- Lena Meyer-Landrut, the only other German to have won the Eurovision Song Contest

== Literature ==
- Guido Knopp, Peter Arens: Our best. The 100 greatest Germans. Econ, Munich 2003, ISBN 3-430-15521-5.

Awards and achievements
Preceded by (United Kingdom) Bucks Fizz with Making Your Mind Up	Winner of the Eurovision Song Contest; 1982	Succeeded by (Luxembourg) Corinne Hermès with Si la vie est cadeau
Preceded by Lena Valaitis with Johnny Blue	Germany in the Eurovision Song Contest; 1982	Succeeded by Hoffmann & Hoffmann with Rücksicht
