= Sopotnia Wielka Falls =

Waterfall in the Żywiec Beskids, Poland

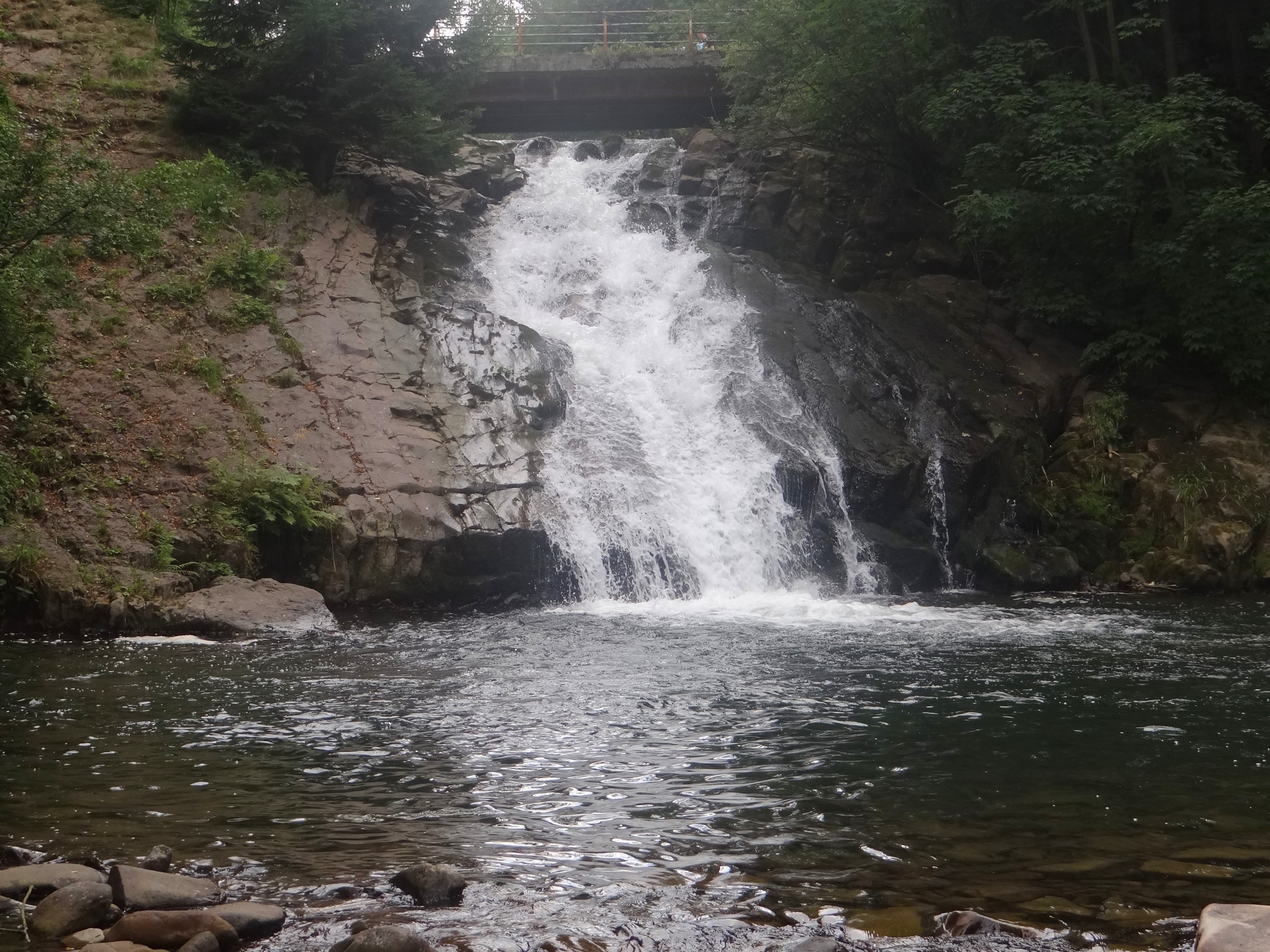
- General view of the waterfall
- Interactive map of Sopotnia Wielka Falls
- Location: Żywiec Beskids, Poland
- Coordinates: 49°35′05″N 19°18′04″E
- Type: Cascade
- Elevation: 620 m (2,030 ft)
- Total height: 12 m (39 ft)
- Watercourse: Sopotnia

Sopotnia Wielka Falls is a waterfall located in Sopotnia Wielka, 20 kilometers south of Żywiec, in the Żywiec Beskids, Silesian Voivodeship, Poland, dropping a total of 12 metres (39 ft). Its waters fall down into a 5-meter deep plunge pool. It lies on the Sopotnia Stream and is the highest waterfall in all of Polish Beskid Mountains. The waterfall and its surroundings have been designated as a protected area.

== See also ==
- Geography of Poland
- List of waterfalls
- Kamieńczyk Falls
