= Sopotnia Wielka =

- Village
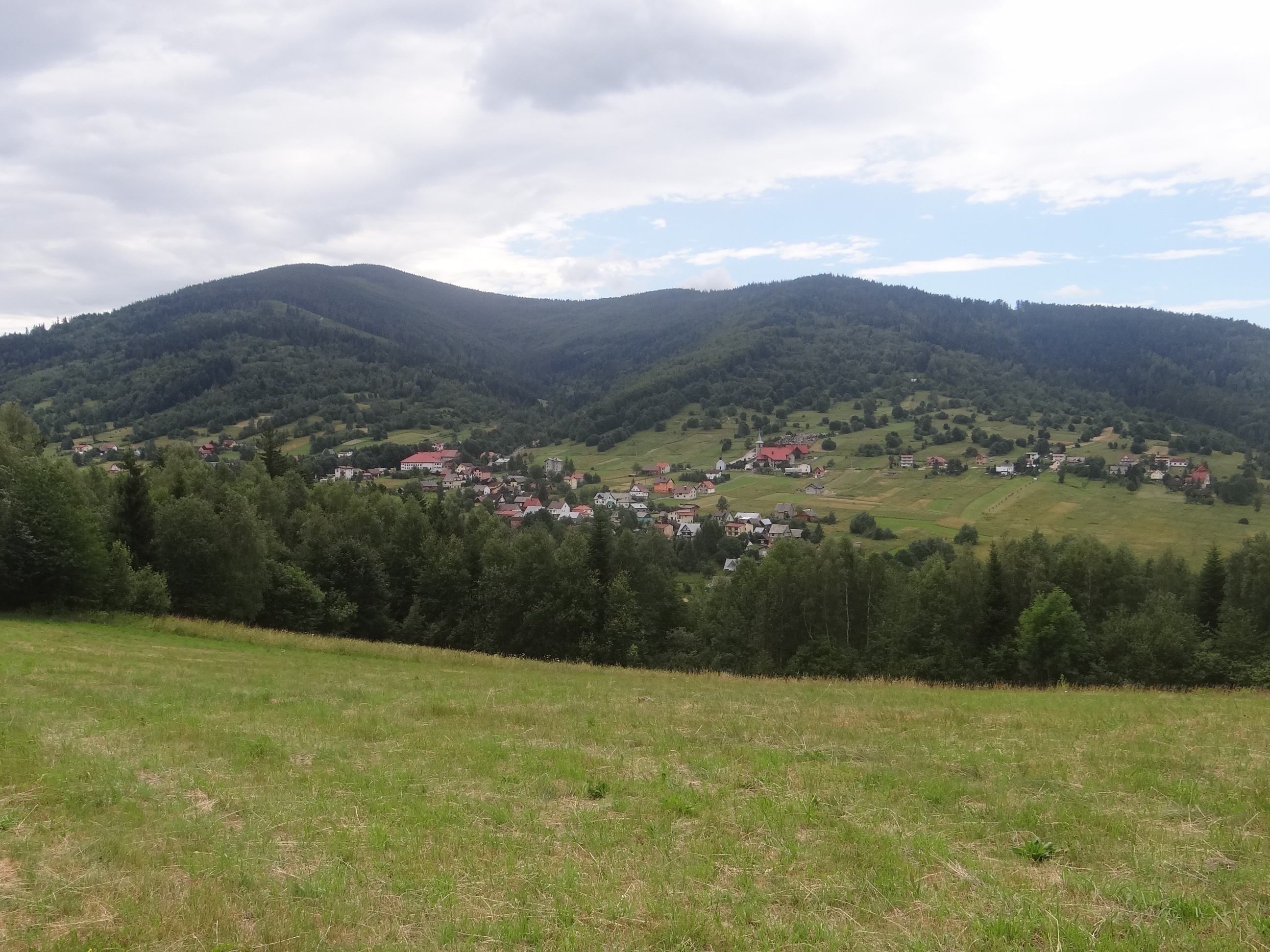

- Location within Poland
- Coordinates: 49°35′N 19°17′E
- Country: Poland
- Voivodeship: Silesian
- County: Żywiec
- Gmina: Jeleśnia
- Highest elevation: 720 m (2,360 ft)
- Lowest elevation: 500 m (1,600 ft)
- Population: 1,667

Sopotnia Wielka [sɔˈpɔtɲa ˈvjɛlka] is a village in the administrative district of Gmina Jeleśnia, within Żywiec County, Silesian Voivodeship, in southern Poland. The most important tourist attraction of the village is Sopotnia Wielka Falls. In 2023, the village became the first International Dark Sky Community (a type of dark-sky preserve) in Poland.

== See also ==
- Bieszczady Starry-Sky Park – Dark-sky park in Poland
- Jizera Dark-Sky Park – First transnational Dark-sky preserve
