= Neunkirchen, Nohfelden =

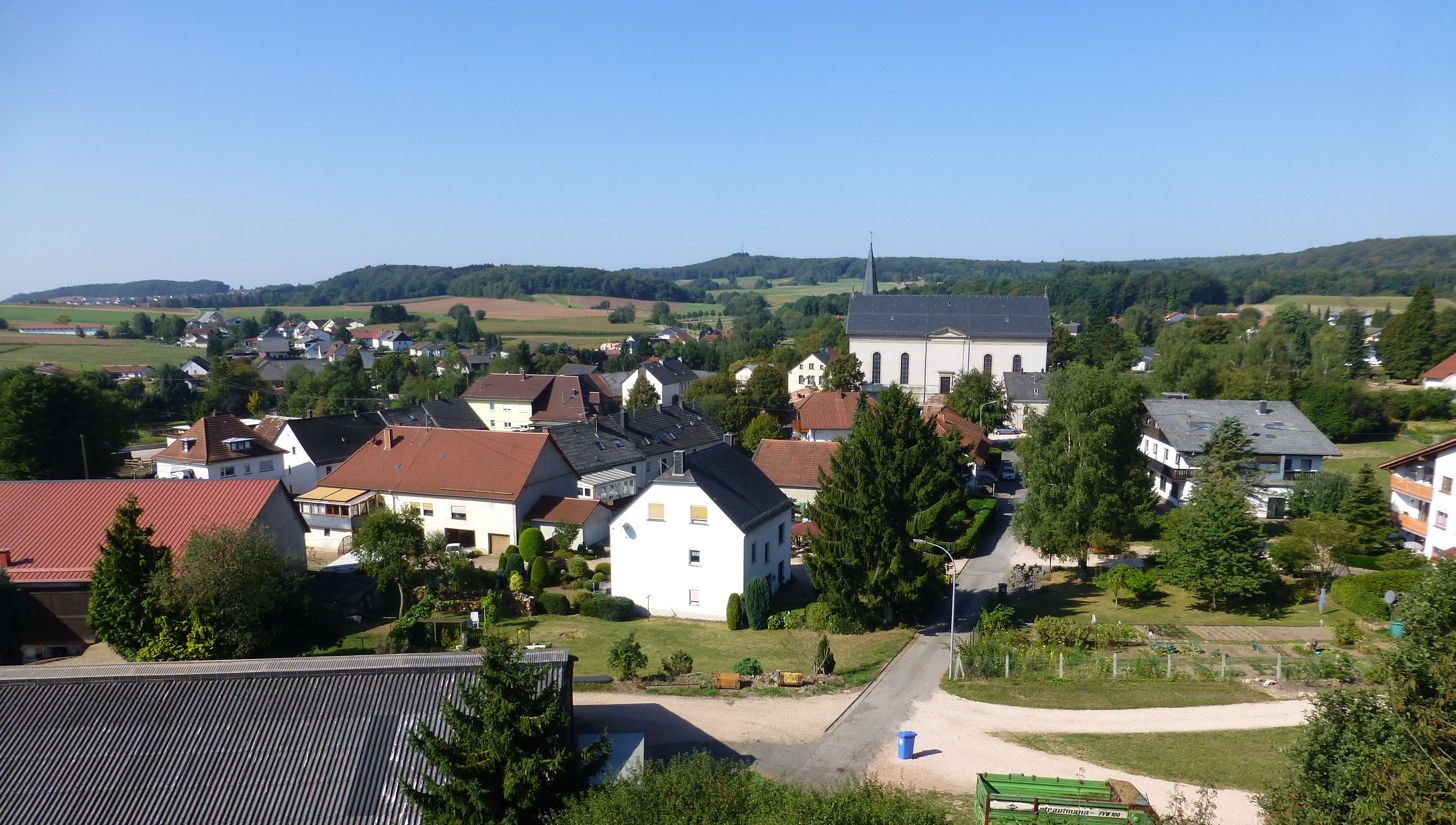
View of the village from an observation tower

Neunkirchen is a village of the municipality of Nohfelden in Saarland, Germany, near the source of the River Nahe.

To distinguish it from other places of the same name, it is sometimes called "Neunkirchen (Nahe)".

Until the end of 1973, Neunkirchen was a municipality in its own right. It includes the small settlements of Elsenberger Mühle (or Amtsschultheissenmühle) and Nohmühle.

== History ==
As the Hochgericht Neunkirchen, meaning High Court of Neunkirchen, the village was historically a fief of the Electoral Palatinate and later of the Duchy of Palatine Zweibrücken, within the Holy Roman Empire. At the time of the First French Empire, Neunkirchen was ceded as part of the Sarre, a territory which became a department of France. Following the Congress of Vienna, from 1817 to 1937 it was part of the Grand Duchy of Oldenburg's Principality of Birkenfeld and the later Birkenfeld district, which after the First World War was separated from Germany and administered by France, to be returned to Germany in 1935. In 1937, the area was added to Prussia. After the Second World War, it became part of the Saar Protectorate, which joined West Germany in 1957, becoming the small German state of Saarland. Now part of the St Wendel district, on 1 January 1974 for local government purposes Neunkirchen was merged into the municipality of Nohfelden.

== Description ==
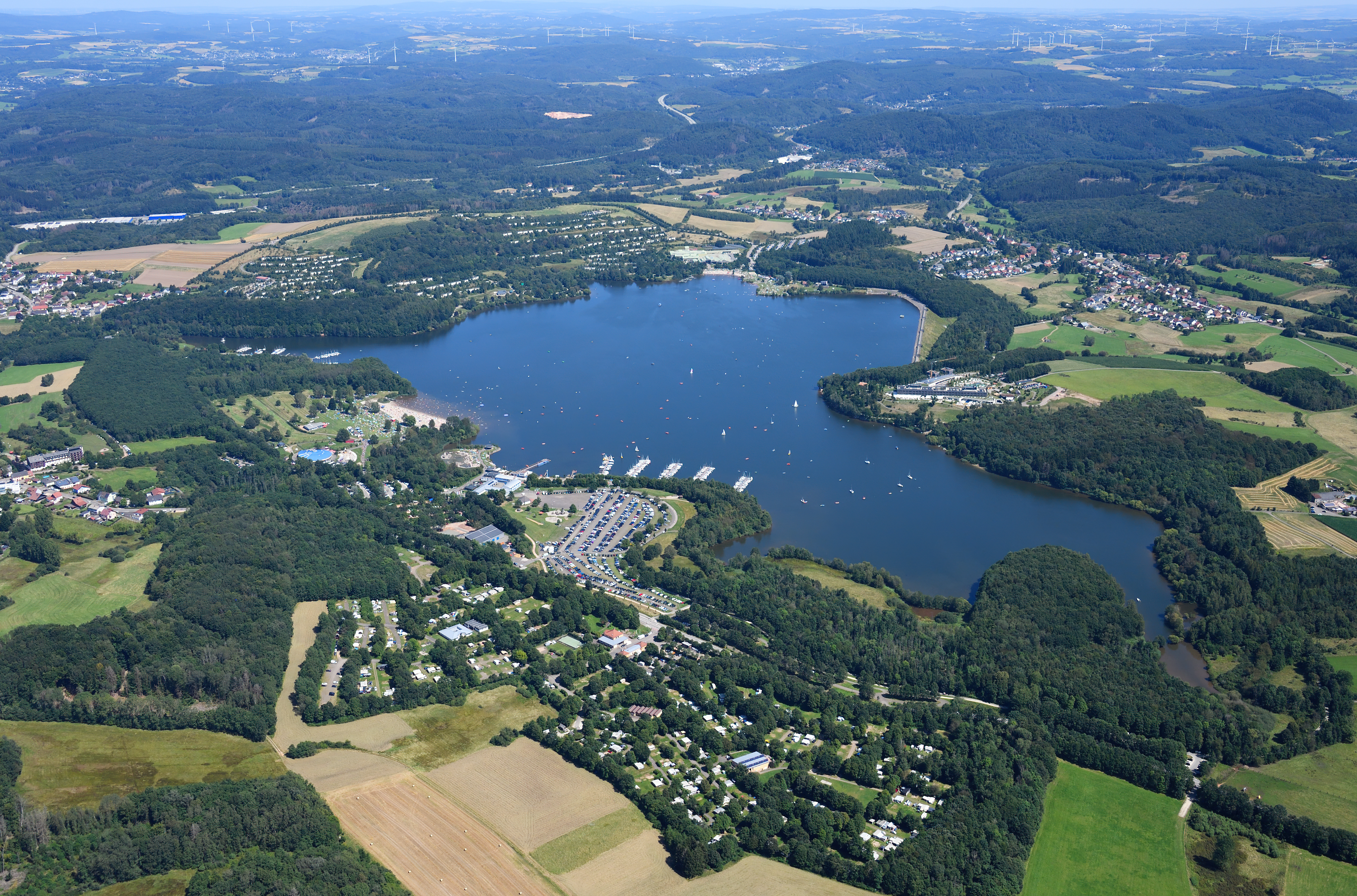
The Bostalsee

Neunkirchen lies some two miles south of the Bostalsee, a reservoir and recreational lake created in 1979. It has a Roman Catholic parish church called St Martin's, with a medieval bell tower. Most of the church dates from 1829. The village has a small leisure park with a mini-golf course and a lookout tower. There is a retirement home, a general practitioner's surgery, a dentist, a pharmacy, and a hotel.

There is an elected village council with nine members, including a local mayor.

Neunkirchen is served by Saar-Mobil buses.

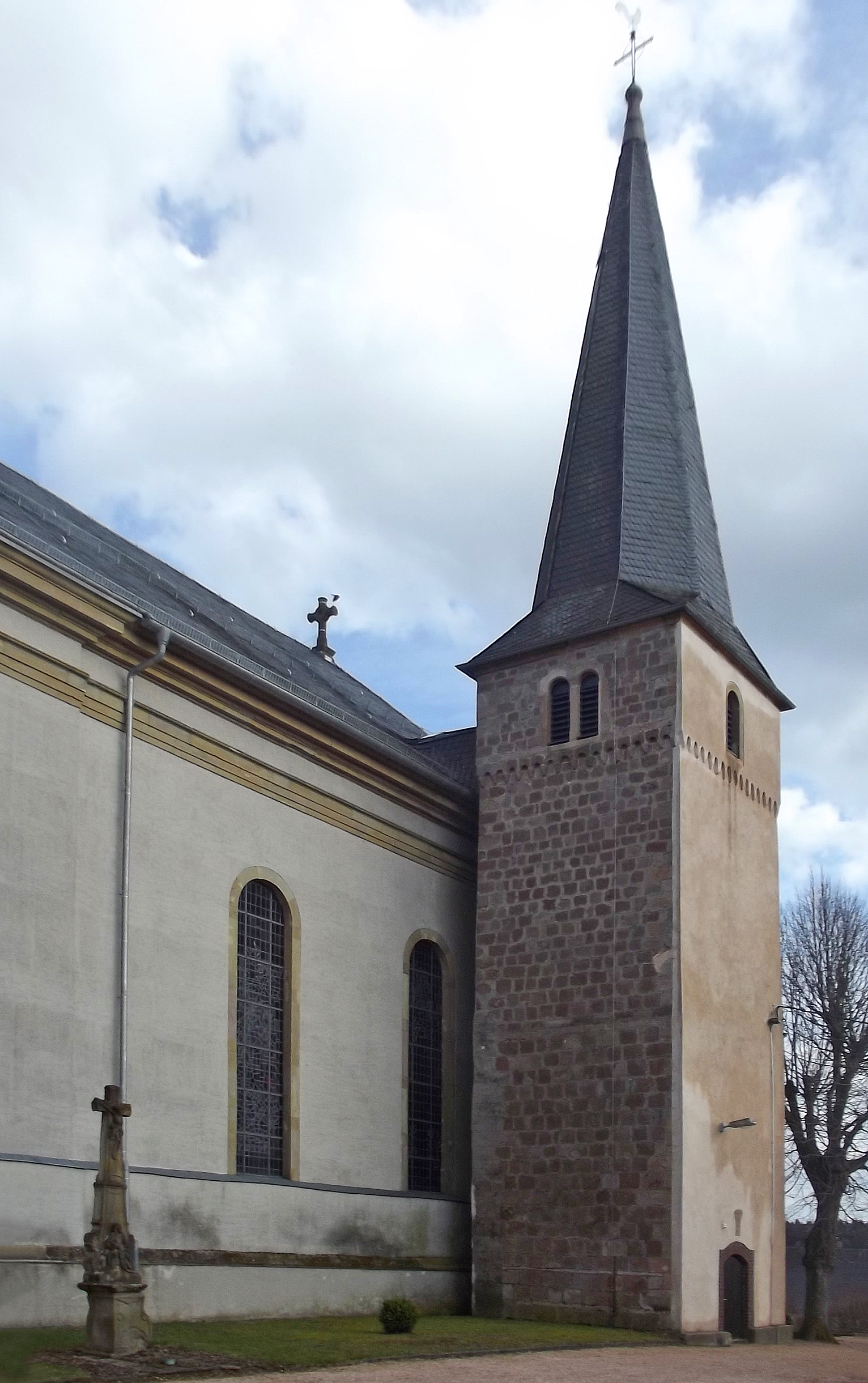
The church tower

== Notable people ==
The singer Nicole Seibert lives at Neunkirchen.

== Gallery ==
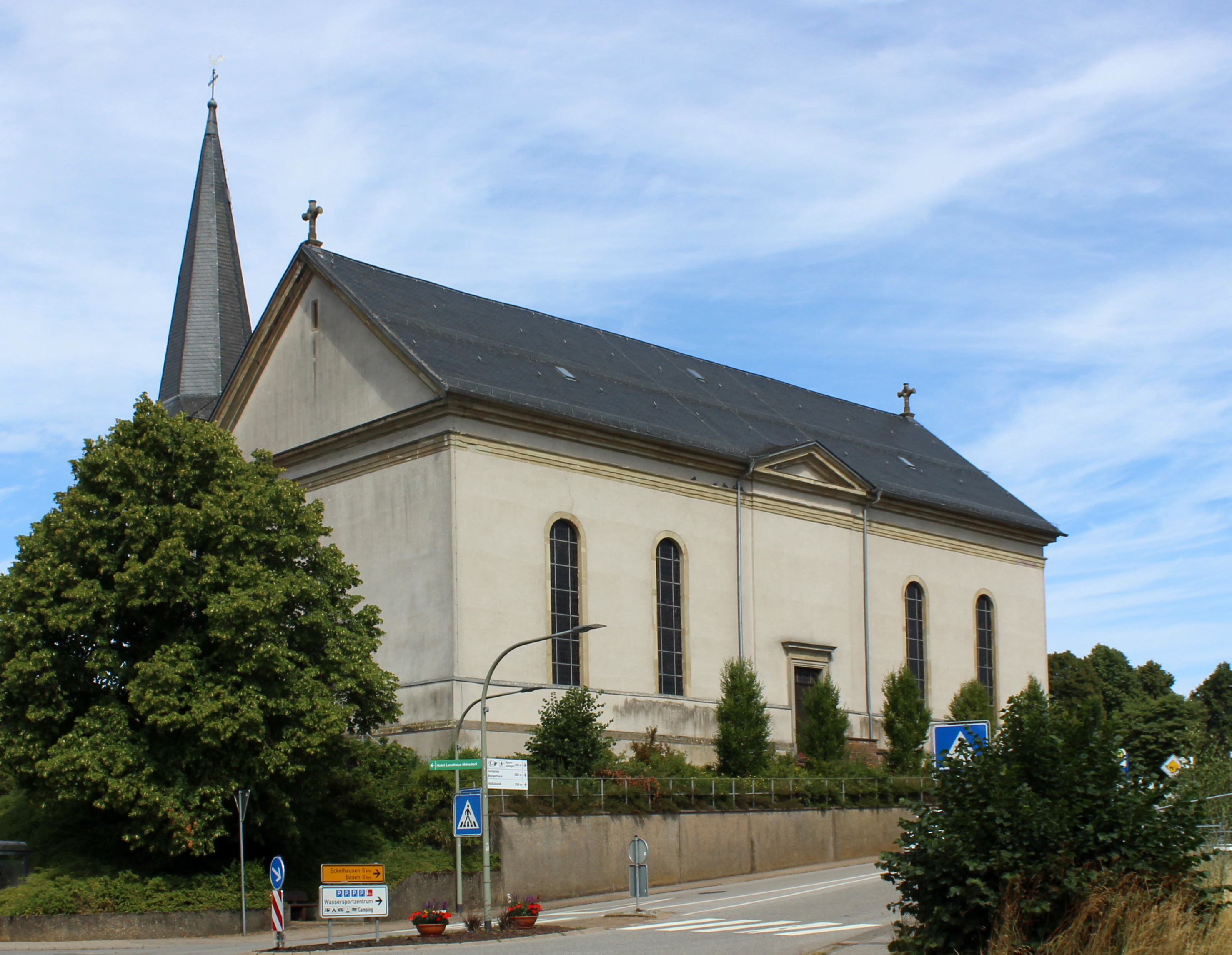
St Martin's Church

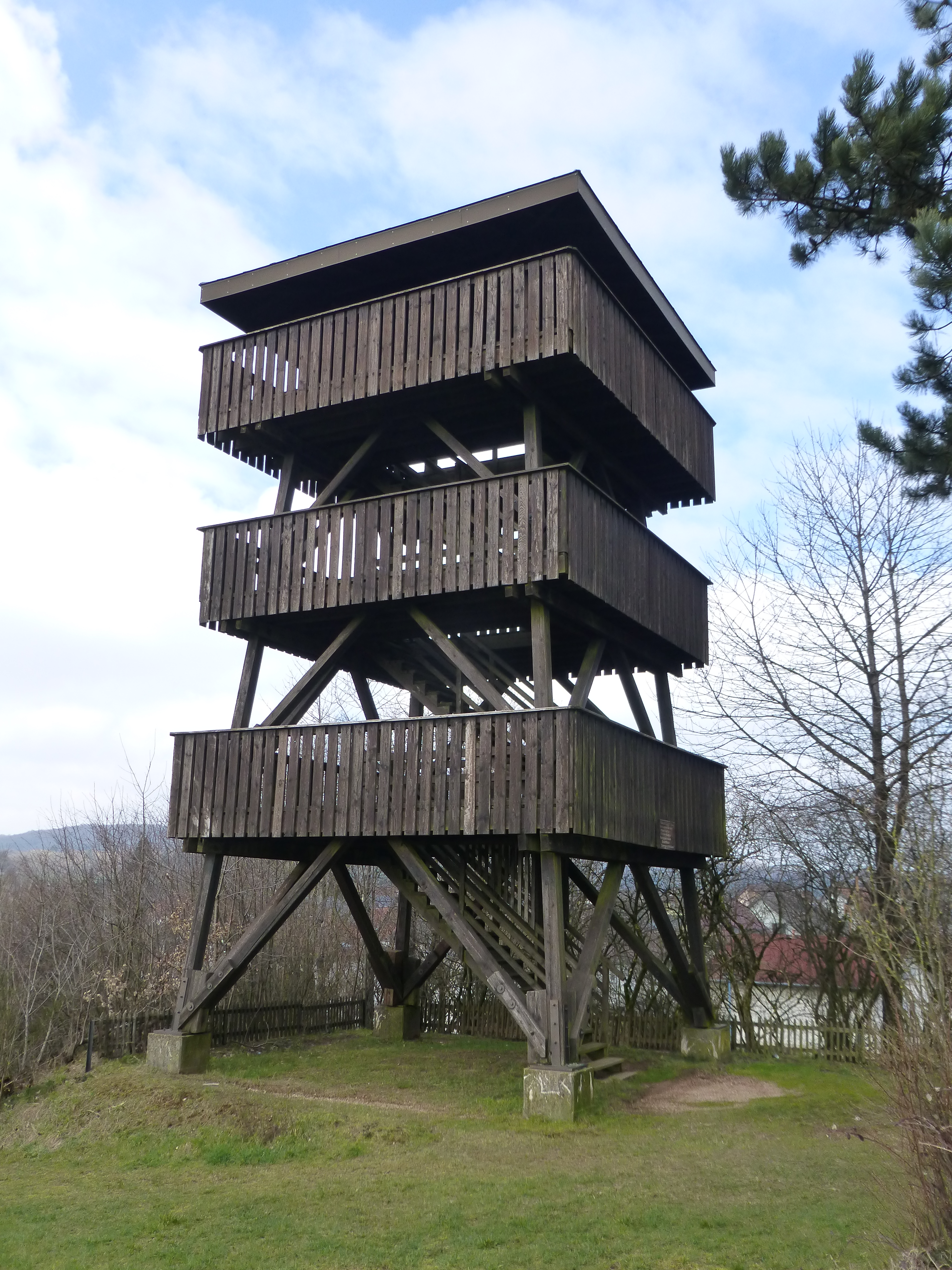
Lookout tower in park

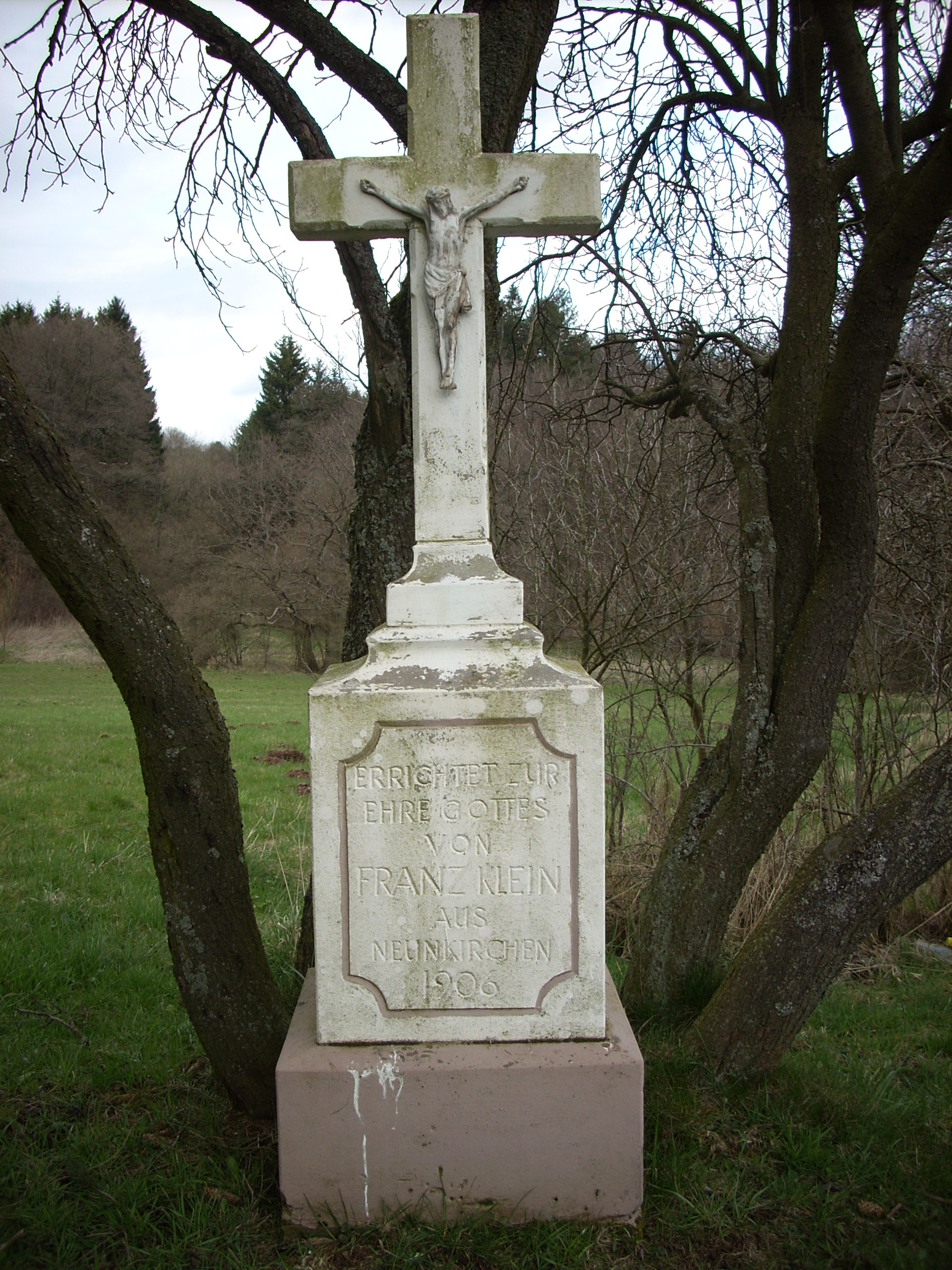
Monumental cross of 1906

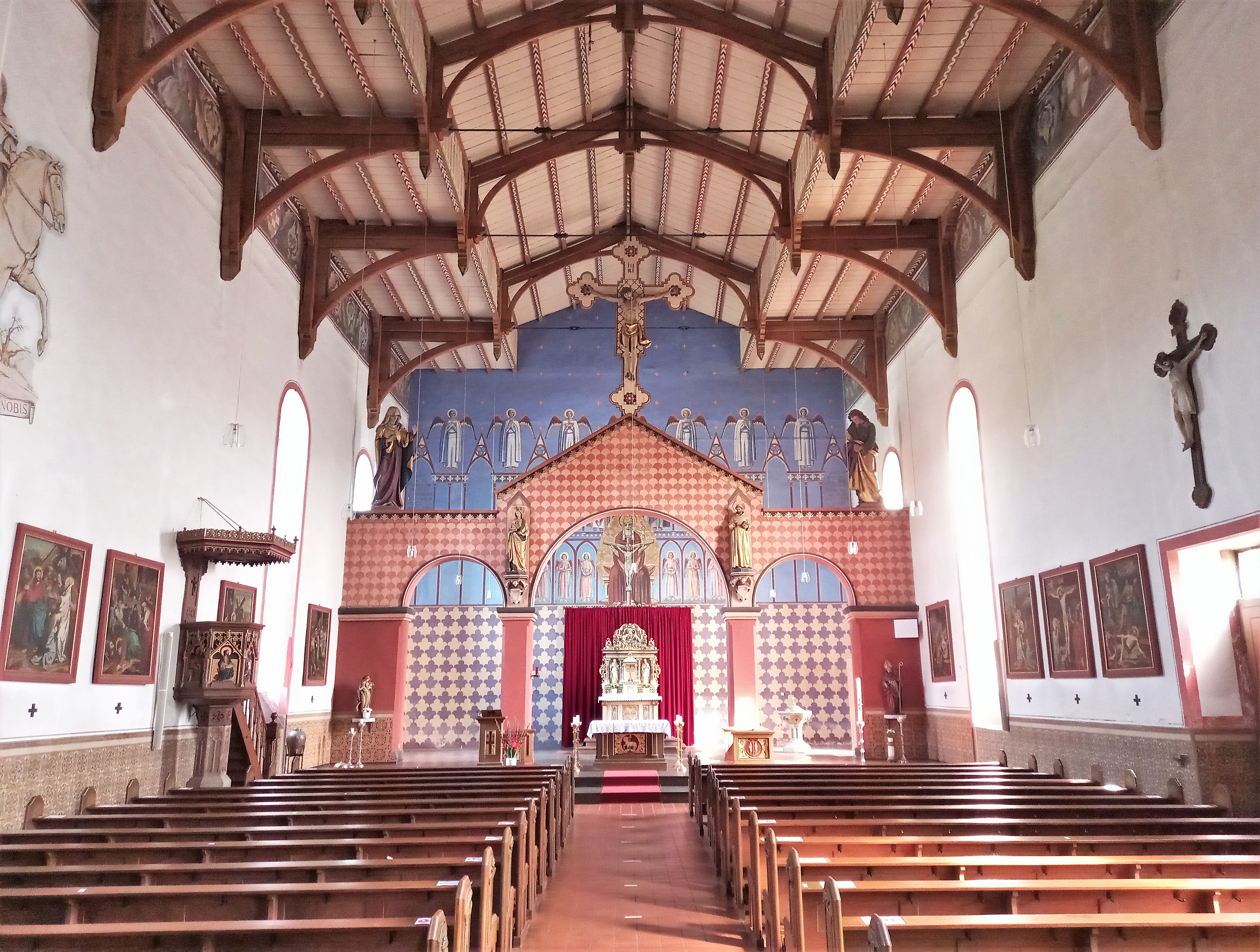
Inside St Martin's Church

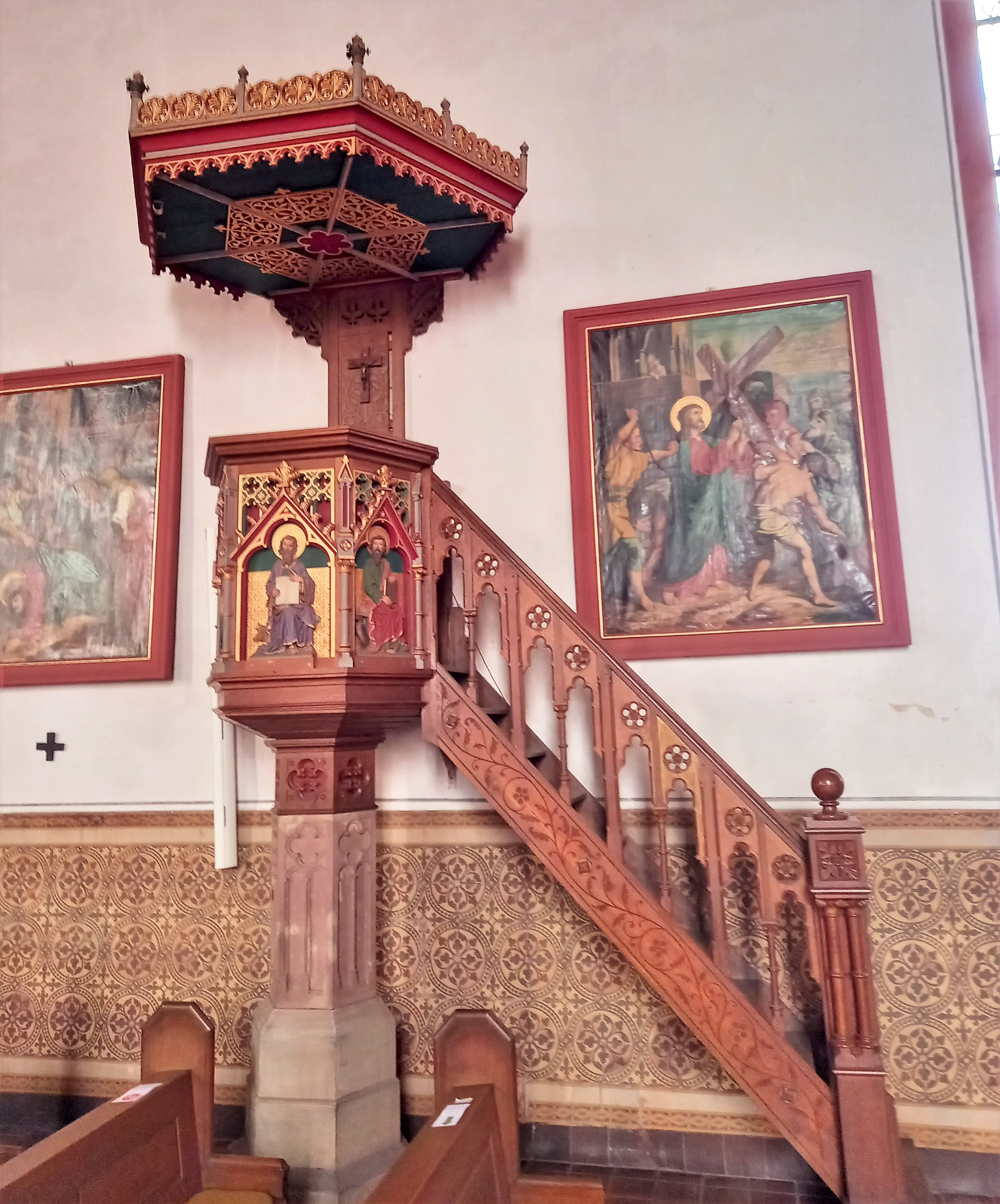
Church pulpit

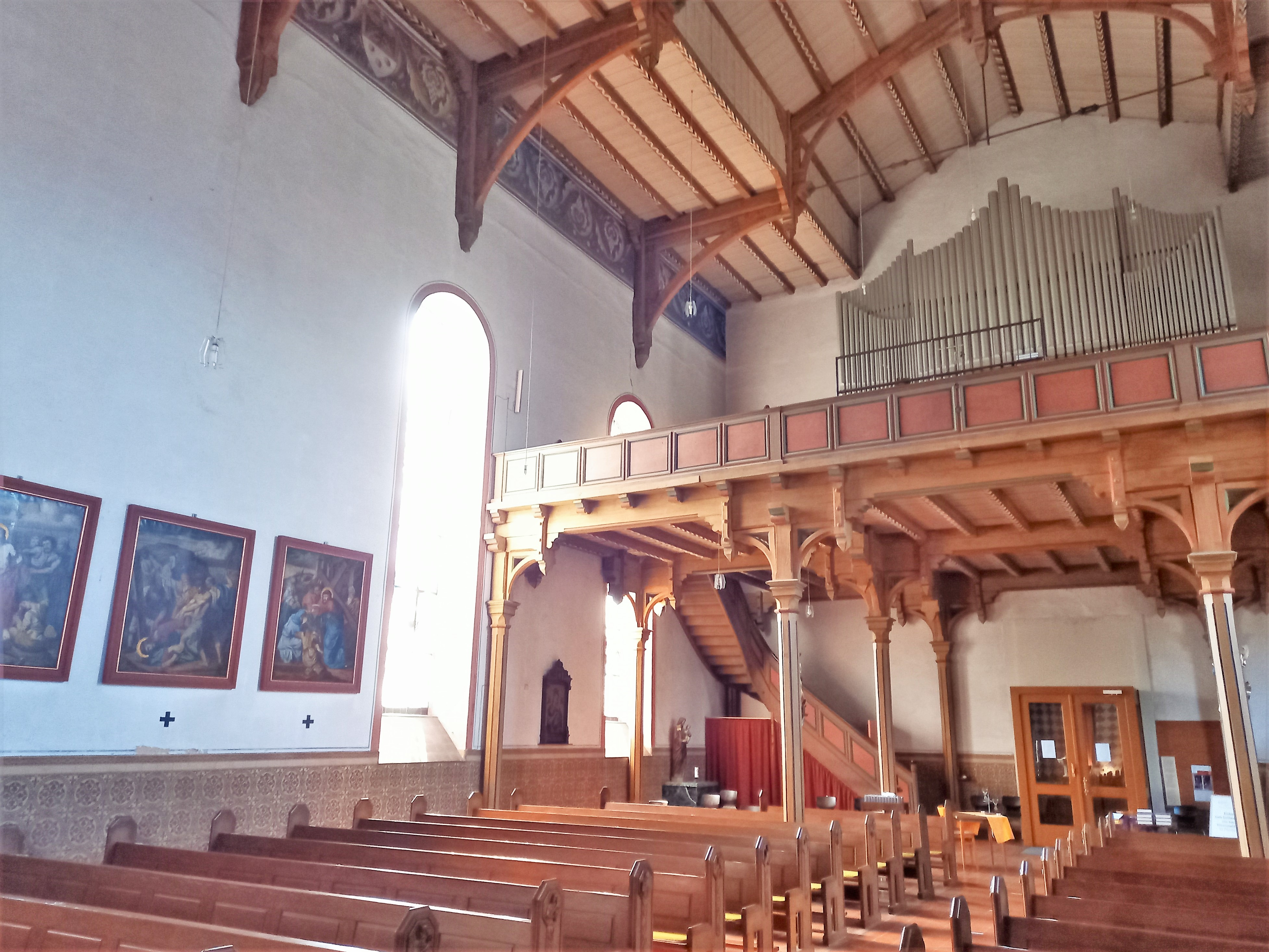
Gallery with church pipe organ

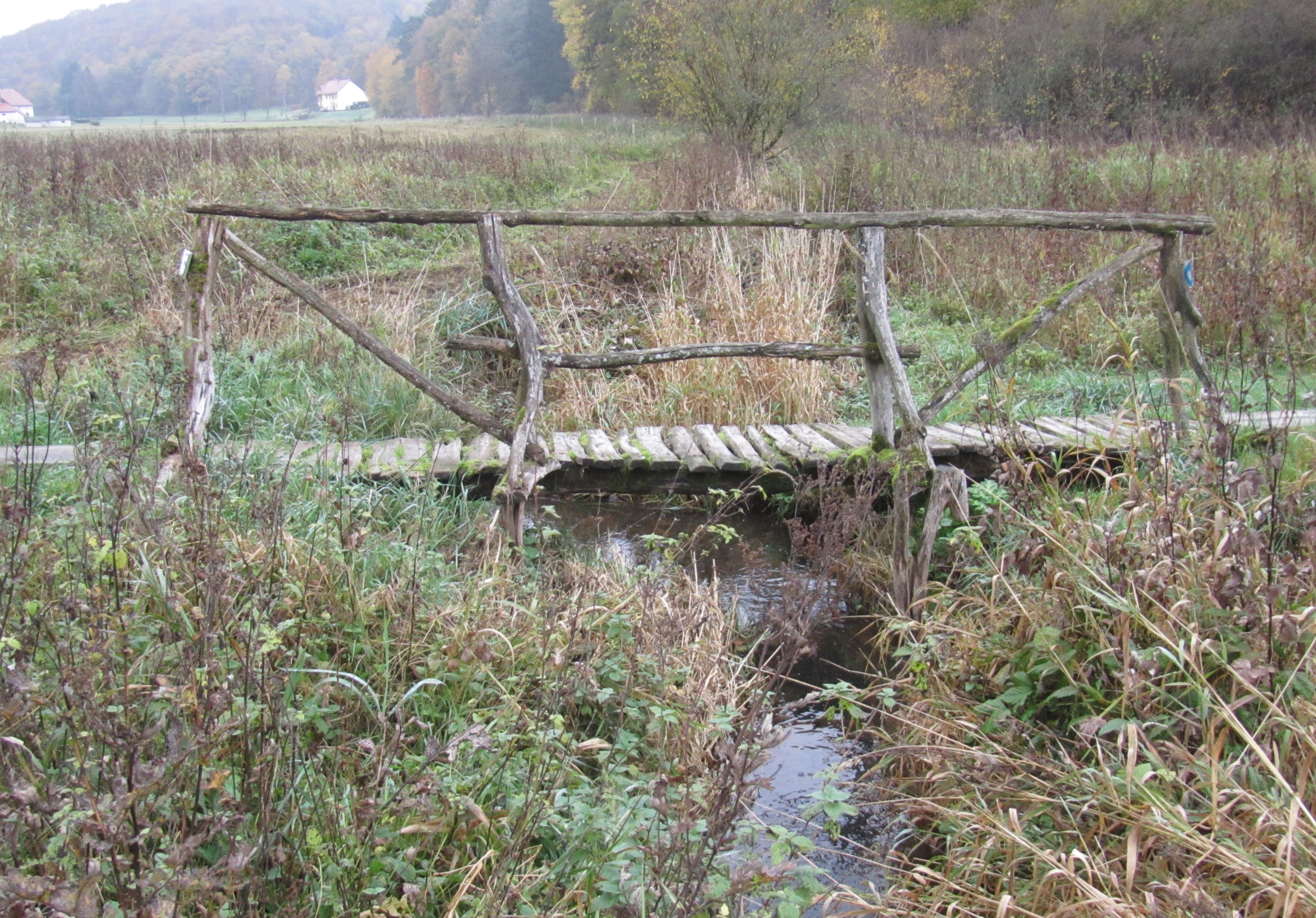
A wooden foot bridge

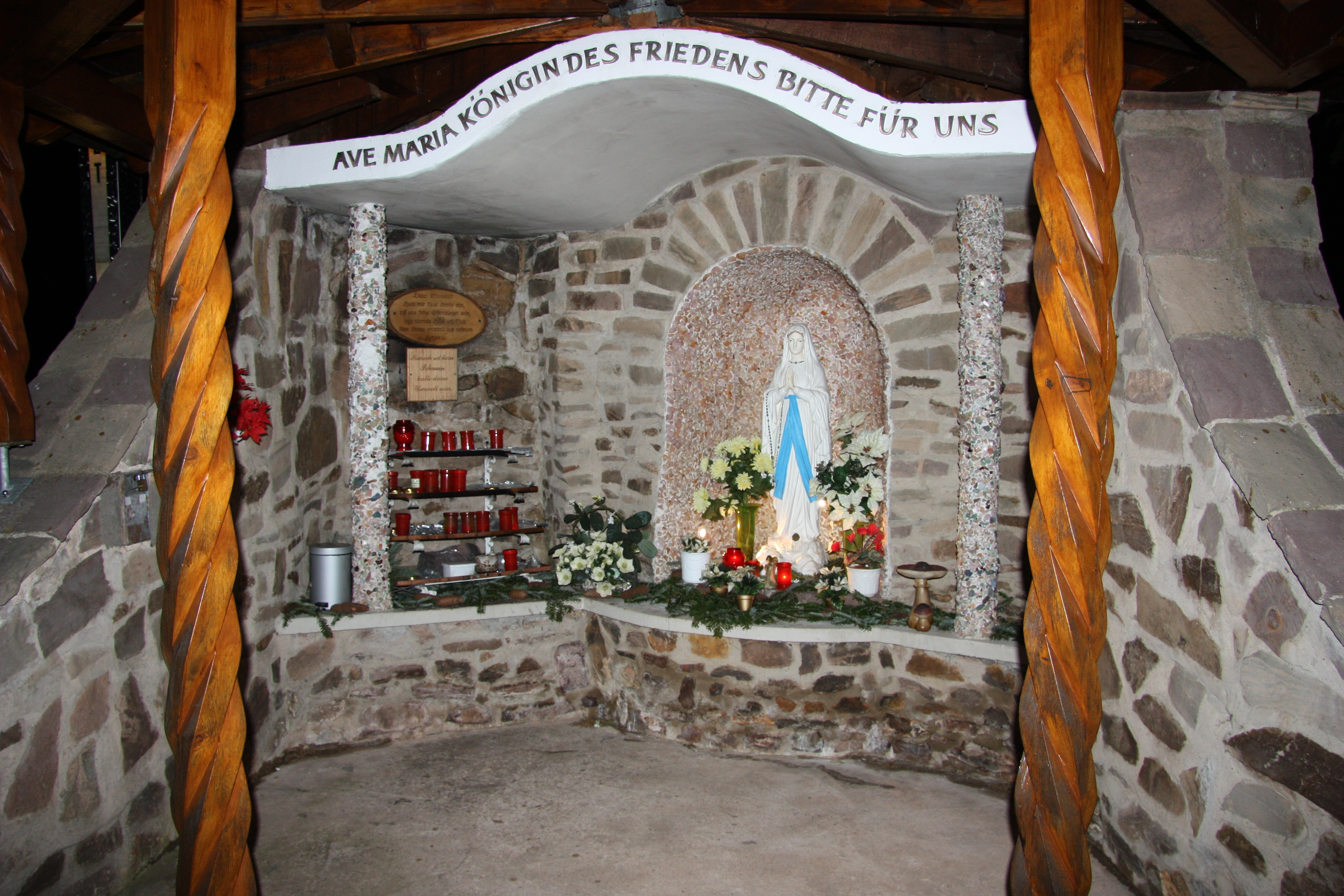
Shrine of St Mary at Elsenberger Mühle

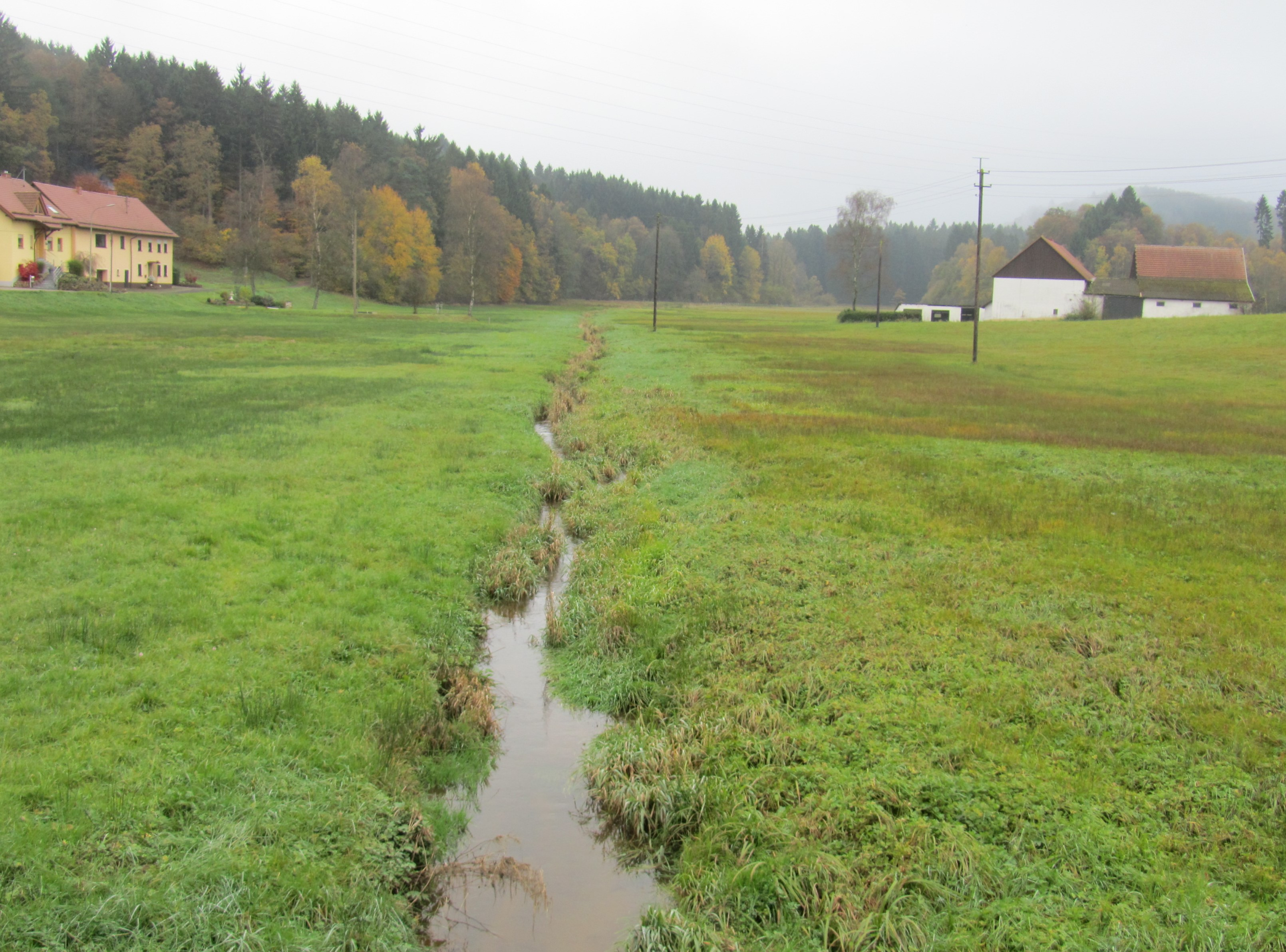
A drainage ditch
