= Principality of Birkenfeld =

Exclave incorporated into Prussia

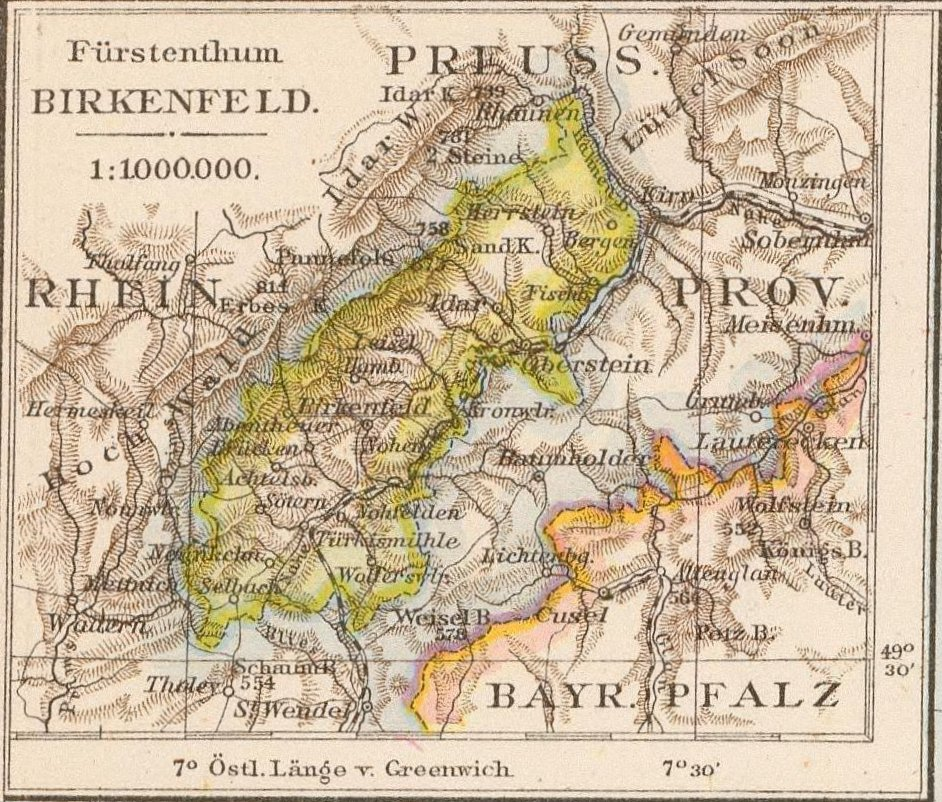
Map (Richard Andree, 1881)

Coat of arms of the Principality of Birkenfeld

The Principality of Birkenfeld (German: Fürstentum Birkenfeld), known after 1919 as the Region of Birkenfeld (German: Landesteil Birkenfeld), was an exclave of the Grand Duchy and then the Free State of Oldenburg from 1817 until 1937, when it was incorporated into Prussia. It was located in the Nahe region on the left bank of the Rhine river and its capital was Birkenfeld. The government was led by a Government-President (Regierungspräsident) who was appointed by the government of Oldenburg.

== Territory ==
The area of the Principality of Birkenfeld was composed from the territory that had previously belonged to the Sarre department of the First French Empire. The French had annexed the territory from seven different sovereigns:

- Baden: Most of the court district of Birkenfeld and the southern half of the court district of Oberstein;
- Palatine Zweibrücken: Mayoralties of Nohfelden and Achtelsbach, small parts of Birkenfeld and Neunkirchen;
- County of Limburg-Stirum: Most of the Mayoralty of Oberstein;
- Rhine counts of Salm: Part of the court district of Oberstein;
- Principality of Salm-Kyrburg: Parts of the Mayoralty of Fischbach;
- County of Oettingen: Eiweiler in the Mayoralty of Neunkirchen;
- Electorate of Trier: Imsbach and parts of the Mayoralties of Herrstein and Neunkirchen.

Oldenburg divided the Principality into three Ämter ("court districts"), which were divided in turn into Bürgermeistereien ("Mayoralties"), each containing around a dozen settlements:

- Amt Birkenfeld (Birkenfeld, Leisel, Niederbrombach)
- Amt Nohfelden (Achtelsbach, Neunkirchen, Nohfelden)
- Amt Oberstein (Fischbach, Herrstein, Oberstein)

Most of this territory is now in Birkenfeld district of Rhineland-Palatinate; the southernmost portion is now in Sankt Wendel district of Saarland.

== History ==
=== Creation ===
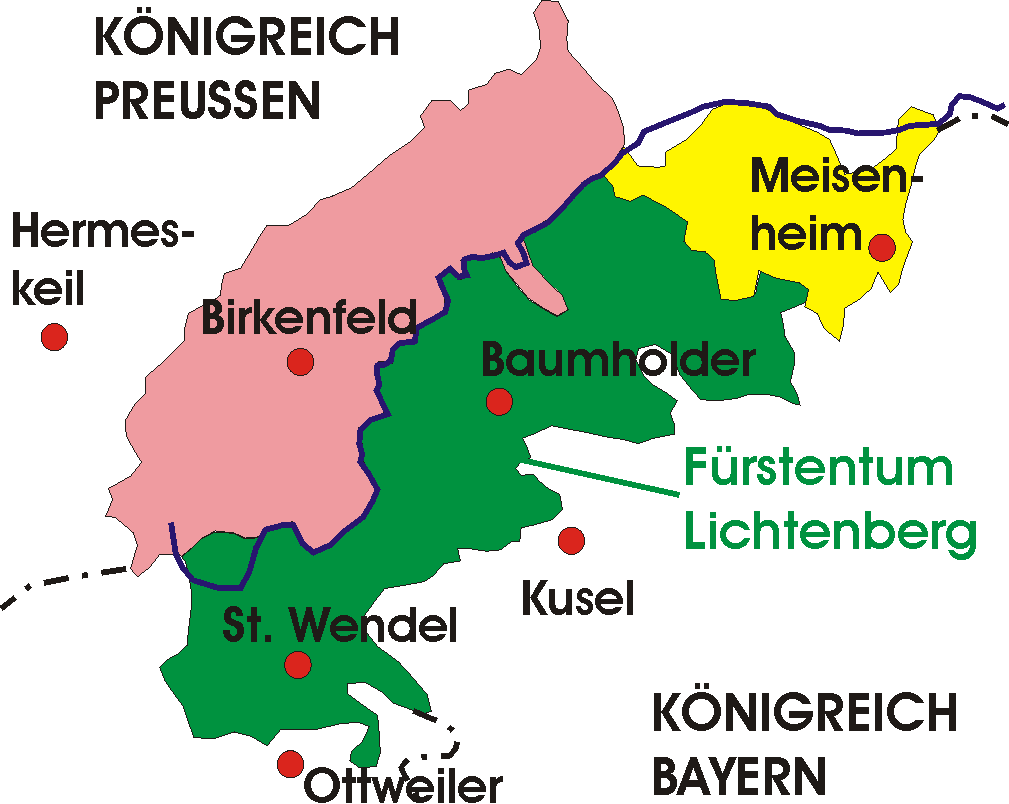
Principality of Birkenfeld (pink) and other territories left of the Rhine that were ceded by Prussia at the Congress of Vienna.

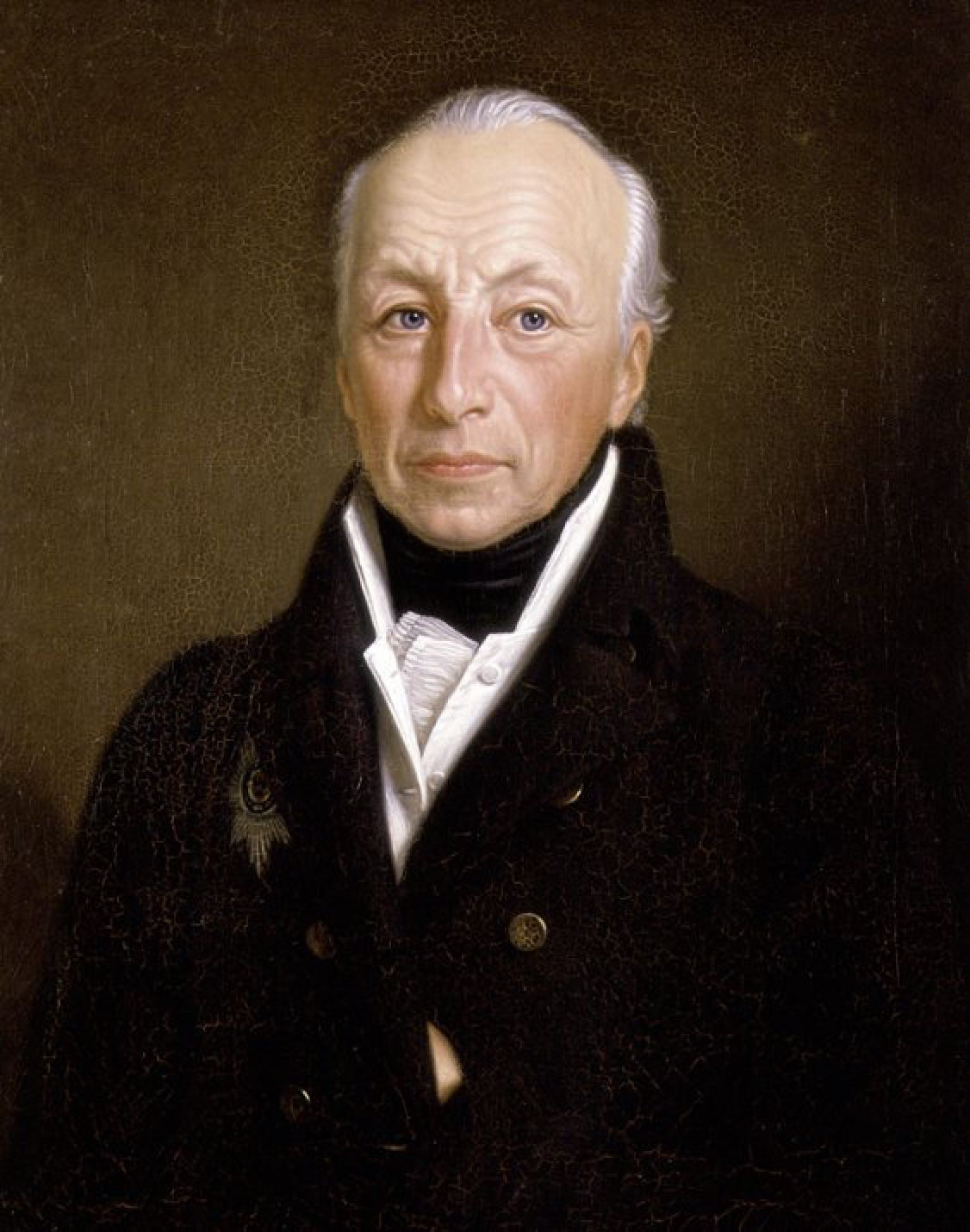
Peter of Holstein-Gottorp, regent (1785–1823) and Grand Duke of Oldenburg (1823–1829).

During negotiations at the Congress of Vienna in 1815, the Kingdom of Prussia agreed that, in view of its territorial gains in the Saar region, it would hand over an area of the former Sarre department of France with 69,000 inhabitants as compensation to Saxe-Coburg-Saalfeld, Oldenburg, Hesse-Homburg, Mecklenburg-Strelitz, and the Counts of Pappenheim. Oldenburg's compensation was most of the canton of Birkenfeld, the whole of the canton of Herrstein, and portions of the cantons of Wadern, Hermeskeil, Sankt Wendel, Baumholder, and Rhaunen. These territories were then united into the Principality of Birkenfeld. Saxe-Coburg-Saalfeld received neighbouring territories, including the rest of the canton of Birkenfeld, which became the Principality of Lichtenberg, while Hesse-Homburg received the Lordship of Meisenheim, and other means were found to compensate Mecklenburg-Strelitz and Pappenheim. Oldenburg was thereby compensated for the loss of the Elsfleth Weser toll.

The decision to give the area to Oldenburg was made by the Territorial Commission of the European Great Powers in Frankfurt, after the major division of territory had been decided in Vienna. Peter of Holstein-Gottorp, regent of Oldenburg, had originally expected a substantial territorial grant on the North Sea coast with 160,000 inhabitants and was so infuriated at the allocation of the tiny, distant territory that he refused the grand ducal status awarded to Oldenburg at Vienna and planned to refuse the territory. Only after the territorial division was finalised in 1816, was the regent convinced by his civil service to send the legation secretary Ludwig Starklof to evaluate the region.

Finally, on 16 April 1817, Oldenburg took possession of the region, which was named the "Principality of Birkenfeld." The seat of government and the official residence were in Birkenfeld, which was near the centre of the territory. Government was entrusted to a college of five jurists. The area was divided into three court districts (Ämter): Birkenfeld, Nohfelden and Oberstein. Each of these was to be managed by an Amtmann and an Amt-assessor. These court districts were divided into mayoralties (Bürgermeistereien), modelled on the abolished French administrative districts. The inhabitants had no parliamentary representation until 1848, when the Provinzialrat was created as a parliament. Even then, it had only an advisory function.

=== Revolution of 1848 ===
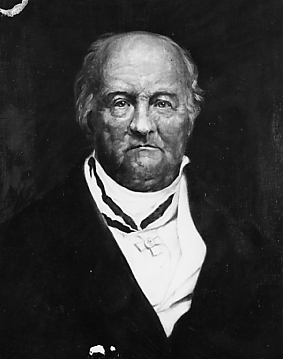
Laurenz Hannibal Fischer, Government-President of Birkenfeld (1831–1848).

In the neighbouring Principality of Lichtenberg, there were popular revolts in 1832 during the Hambach Festival, which led to Prussian troops being dispatched to deal with the rebels, especially in Sankt Wendel. As a result, the Saxe-Coburg rulers of Lichtenberg lost all popular support among the people and therefore sold the principality and its unruly population to Prussia.

By contrast, Birkenfeld remained calm at that time. Revolutionary uprisings only came to the Principality in March 1848, prompted in large part by Government-President Fischer's authoritarianism and opposition to the popular will. Aside from the general hostility to Fischer, there were two opposing forces in Birkenfeld in 1848. On the one hand, the party of order, which was loyal to Oldenburg and was strongest in and around the city of Birkenfeld itself. On the other hand, there was a movement to be rid of Oldenburg in the area around Idar and Oberstein. This group was composed of both Idar and Oberstein's bourgeoise (jewellery merchants and industrialists) and the proletariat, since the outdated state machinery represented a major hindrance for businessman with a regional or international perspective and for the workers who were dependent on them. As a result of these forces, the revolutionary demonstrations in the Principality of Birkenfeld were the fiercest in the whole of Oldenburg. For example, in the popular demonstrations in centrally located Niederbrombach, up to 4,000 people participated.

Finally, the protestors won the dismissal of the hated Government-President Fischer and the establishment of a Provinzialrat ("Provincial Council," renamed the Landesausschuss, "Regional Committee" in 1900), which however had only an advisory function. The simultaneous establishment of the Oldenburg Landtag had no impact on Birkenfeld, since the Birkenfelders formed a small minority in that body. The constitution promulgated in Oldenburg in 1852, shortly after the revolution, was relatively liberal and progressive, since it was based on French law and guaranteed the equality of all people before the law. It allowed a relatively free press, religious freedom, and an equal position for all three religions (Protestantism, Catholicism, and Judaism). Thus, Birkenfeld was one of only two states in the whole German Confederation, where there was no legal bar on the integration of the Jews into civil society (along with Luxembourg). There were no politically motivated prosecutions or other kinds of repression in Birkenfeld after the Revolution.

=== French occupation ===
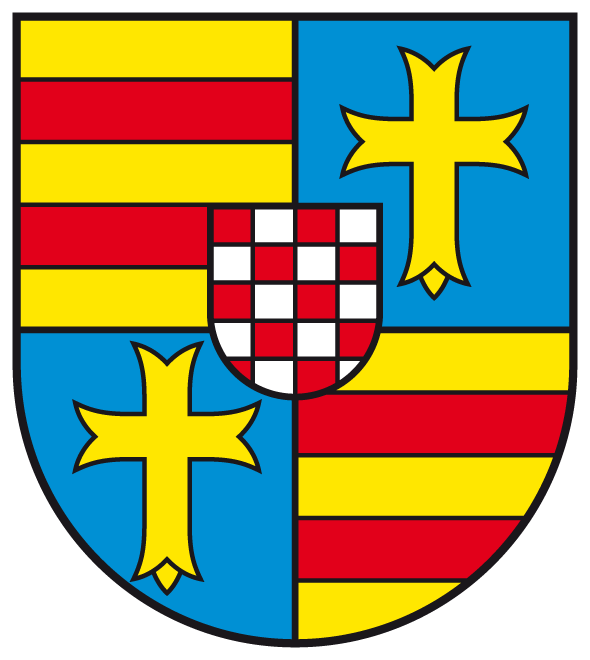
Coat of arms of the Region of Birkenfeld

After the armistice at the end of the First World War, Grand Duke Frederick Augustus II abdicated. The Grand Duchy became the Free State of Oldenburg, a parliamentary democracy. Birkenfeld was initially dubbed a Provinz ("province") and then a Landesteil (region), as was Oldenburg's other exclave, the Principality of Lübeck. Birkenfeld was occupied by French troops with Major Bastiani as military administrator. The French administration was not very attentive and the period was time of hardship.

The French employed various means of control, such as the declaration of emergencies, and supported individuals with separatist aspirations. On 14 July 1919, Bastille Day, the acting Government-President of Birkenfeld was removed and the "Birkenfeld Republic" proclaimed. As a result of massive pressure from the population, elections had to be held, which delivered a decisive defeat for supporters of the new Republic, thus sealing its fate. The Landesausschuss (parliament, the former Provinzialrat) unanimously chose Walther Dörr, a lawyer from Idar, who had sat in the Oldenburg Landtag for several years as a left-liberal, as the new Government-President.

A second separatist attempt took place in 1923, during the Occupation of the Ruhr, with the establishment of the Rhenish Republic, which was carried out in Birkenfeld mainly by foreigners under the protection of the French troops, who had declared a strict state of emergency. The authorities, including Government-President Dörr were expelled from the territory on 24 October 1923. In Idar, citizens stormed the Rathaus, which had been occupied by the separatists, on 11 November 1923 and multiple people were killed or wounded on both sides. The French military government further tightened the state of emergency as a result, but in the end it had to abandon all support for the Republic. The occupying troops withdrew in 1930.

=== Rise of the Nazi party ===
Around the same time, the Nazi party in Birkenfeld united around Herbert Wild, who had joined the party in 1928. Although Oberstein mostly voted for social democrats or communists and the Catholic areas in the north and west favoured the Centre Party, the Nazis found wide support. In the polarised political landscape there were initially bloody confrontations between the supporters of opposing parties (e.g., Niederwörresbach and Oberstein in 1928). Since the local police forces were insufficient to maintain order, the district government of Idar-Oberstein formed a branch of the Oldenburg Security Police in 1931 to protect public security and order. This consisted of around fifteen Beamte under the command of a police officer. This force remained in existence until 1935.

The Nazi party won clear majorities in Birkenfeld and Adolf Hitler addressed a crowd at the Klotz sportsground in Idar on 20 May 1932. In elections to the Oldenburg Landtag, the Nazi Party won enough seats to govern alone. In Idar, the Nazi Party received 70% of the vote. The Government-President Dörr was forced out of office on flimsy grounds and replaced by Herbert Wild, which required a legal amendment, since the Government-President was required to be a fully qualified lawyer and Wild was not.

=== End of Birkenfeld ===
The Nazis restructured Germany. Under the Greater Hamburg Act, which came into effect on 1 April 1937, Birkenfeld became a Landkreis of Koblenz region in Rhine Province of Prussia and ceased to be part of Oldenburg. Today, the territory of the old court districts of Birkenfeld and Oberstein are in Birkenfeld district of Rhineland-Palatinate except for Kirnsulzbach which is part of Bad Kreuznach district. Most of the former court district of Nohfelden is now in Saarland.

== Government and politics ==
The highest administrative authority was the Birkenfeld government, which had control over the state treasury and revenue, healthcare, the Gendarmerie, the forest and hunting services, construction, the land register, the postal service, indirect taxation, and the region's rabbinate. It delegated some administrative functions to the mayoralties.

=== Law ===
The Napoleonic Code, the French private law system, which had been introduced during the French occupation of the region, remained in force in the Principality, as the "Rheinisches Recht", until it was replaced by the Bürgerliches Gesetzbuch in 1900.

The highest legal authority in the Principality was the High Court in Birkenfeld (Obergericht zu Birkenfeld), which was an appellate court. From there, cases could be appealed to the High Court of Appeals (Oberappellationsgericht). The courts of first instance were the District Courts (Amtsgerichte ) in Birkenfeld, Oberstein, and Nohfelden. The state police were generally the Gendarmerie of the Principality of Birkenfeld, who had no connection to the Grand Duchy's State Dragoons Corps (called the Gendarmerie Corps after 1867), were not organised as a military force, and were under the direct control of the Birkenfeld government.

=== Military ===
As a member of the German Confederation from 1815, Oldenburg was obliged to maintain soldiers, but initially no one in the Principality of Birkenfeld was required to perform military service. As the possibility of war with France increased following the July Revolution in 1830, the Federal Convention of the Confederation reminded Oldenburg and the other German states of their obligation to maintain a set number of troops. Therefore, Grand Duke Augustus introduced conscription. The Birkenfeld contingent of the Oldenburg infantry had a nominal strength of 384 men. It was stationed in Birkenfeld as a second reserve company of the second regiment and a barracks was built for it in the government quarter in 1842.

Every man over the age of twenty was liable to six years of military service. Each year, a sixth of the contingent, 64 men, were released from service and replaced with new recruits. 32 of these men served for six to eight months in peacetime, while the rest were granted leave.

The troops caused an uproar in the German Confederation in 1848, when they refused to serve with the Oldenburg contingent in the First Schleswig War. This resulted in an outright mutiny and the local population supported the soldiers with a petition, composed at an assembly in Niederbrombach on 9 March 1848, which called on the Grand Duke to cancel the order to fight. Grand Duke Augustus abolished the reserve company stationed in Birkenfeld. He formed a fifth light line infantry battalion with a strength of 600 men, divided into four companies, and stationed this force in Birkenfeld. This battalion was itself abolished in 1850, because the Landtag refused to confirm the new arrangement. The old reserve force from 1830 was then restored, but the conscripts from Birkenfeld were now trained in Oldenburg, returning to Birkenfeld after their first training period to serve the rest of their term of service in the force stationed there, the "Birkenfeld Division".

Following the military convention agreed by Oldenburg and Prussia on 15 July 1867, the Principality ceased to have its own military and the city of Birkenfeld lost its garrison. The Birkenfeld Division was abolished on 1 November 1867. Thereafter, the Principality formed part of Prussia's Saarlouis military district for recruitment purposes, but it was soon reassigned to the St. Wendel district and the recruits were assigned to Rhine Province regiments.

=== Communication and transport ===
Oldenburg already had established its own postal service under the Holy Roman Empire and it was retained in Oldenburg and Lübeck after 1815. In Birkenfeld, however, a treaty of 4 August 1817 entrusted the postal service to Thurn und Taxis. After the neighbouring Principality of Lichtenberg was sold to Prussia, Birkenfeld was surrounded by Prussian territory. As a result, it was incorporated into the Prussian postal system after the treaty with Thurn und Taxis expired on 1 November 1837.

With the opening of the Nahe Valley Railway in 1859, the Principality was connected up to the railway network - eight years before the first railway was built in Oldenburg's core territory.

== Demographics ==
=== Religion ===
As of 1858, the religious composition of the Principality was 25,858 united Protestants, 764 Lutherans, 89 Calvinists, 8,027 Catholics, 27 other Christians, and 722 Jews. The Protestant church, which was originally split between Calvinists and Lutherans, was united into a single, united church in 1843.

There were two chief authorities in church administration: the consistory for Protestants and a commission for Catholics, which oversaw fifteen Protestant parishes and seven Catholic ones. The rabbinate was based in Hoppstädten.

=== Education ===
The Oldenburg bureaucracy made the education system of Birkenfeld one of the most outstanding in Germany between 1840 and 1848, in terms of student/teacher ratios, curriculum content, teachers' salaries, and school attendance. Over sixty new schools were built between 1817 and 1848. Interconfessional schools were common, almost a hundred years before the rest of Germany. The schools were managed by a dedicated school commission, in which both Protestants and Catholics had representation.

As of 1855, there were two secondary schools in the Principality, the "höhere Lehranstalt" ("higher teaching institution", a junior Gymnasium) in Birkenfeld with five teachers and the "höhere Bürgerschule" ("higher citizen school") in Idar with four teachers. At that time there were a total of 82 public schools (Protestant, Catholic, Jewish, and interconfessional) with 106 male teachers and 7 female teachers for handicrafts. There were a total of 5388 students (4273 Protestants, 943 Catholics, and 172 Jews).

== List of Government-Presidents ==
Government-Presidents of Birkenfeld
Name	Born-Died	Party affiliation	Start of Tenure	End of Tenure
Ludwig Conrad Leopold Wibel	1768-1833		1817	1831
Laurenz Hannibal Fischer	1784-1868		1831	1848
Alexander von Finckh	1806-1888		1853	1881
August Barnstedt	1823-1914		1881	1901
Adolf Ahlhorn	1838-1917		1901	1909
Friedrich Willich	1846-1917		1909	1917
Hermann Pralle (acting)	1863-1939		1917	1918
Konrad Hartong (acting)	1861-1933		1919	1919
Walther Dörr	1879-1964	German Democratic Party	1919	1923
Karl Nieten (acting)	1883-1957		1923	1924
Walther Dörr	1879-1964	German Democratic Party	1924	1932
Herbert Wild	1886-1969	Nazi Party	1932	1937

== See also ==
- House of Palatinate-Birkenfeld

== Bibliography ==
- Baldes, Heinrich (1921). Die hundertjährige Geschichte des Fürstentums Birkenfeld : zur Jahrhundertfeier 1917 / von Heinrich Baldes. Birkenfeld: Fillmann.
- Brandt, H. Peter (2004). "Monumentale und soziale Reminiszenzen im ehemaligen oldenburgischen Landesteil Birkenfeld". In Welp, Jörgen (ed.). Dem Wohle Oldenburgs gewidmet Aspekte kulturellen und sozialen Wirkens des Hauses Oldenburg; 1773 - 1918. Oldenburg. pp. 61ff. ISBN 3-89995-142-5.
