= Przyborów, Silesian Voivodeship =

Przyborów
- Village
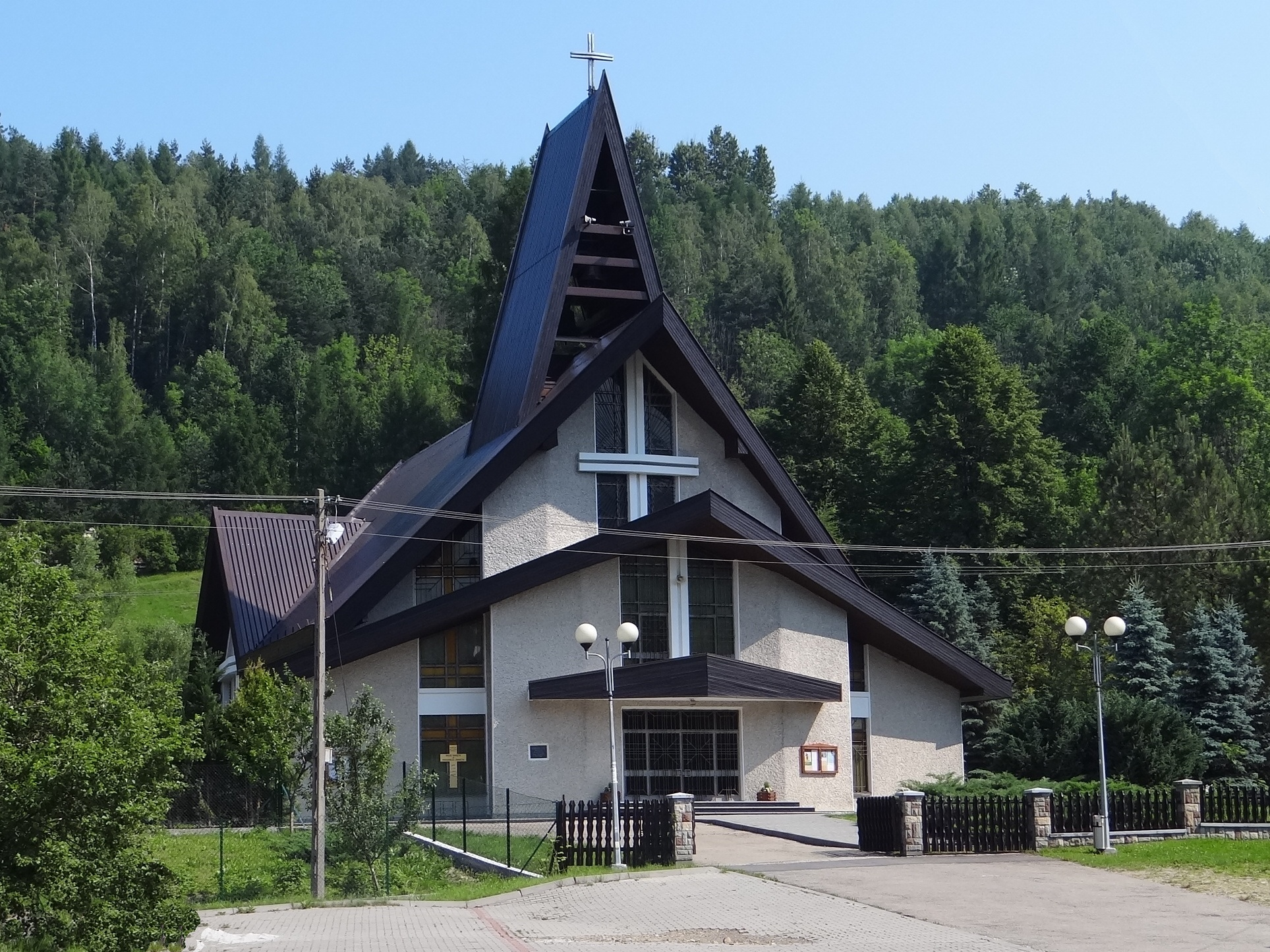
- A local Catholic church

- Location within Poland
- Coordinates: 49°36′58″N 19°22′27″E
- Country: Poland
- Voivodeship: Silesian
- County: Żywiec
- Gmina: Jeleśnia
- Population: 1,793

Przyborów [pʂɨˈbɔruf] is a village in the administrative district of Gmina Jeleśnia, within Żywiec County, Silesian Voivodeship, in southern Poland.

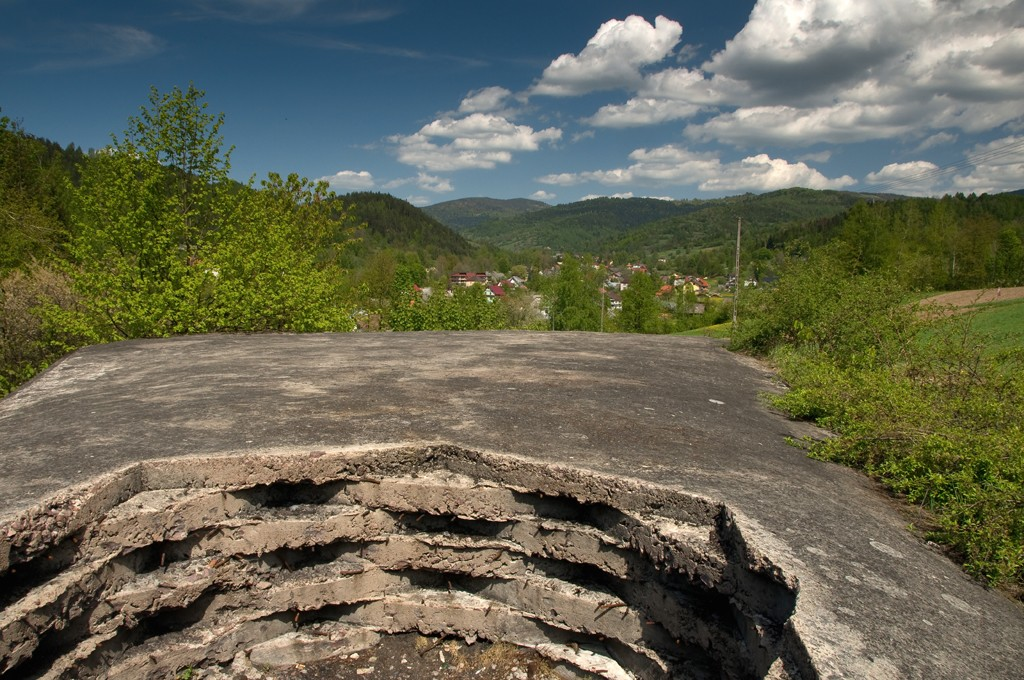
View of Przyborów from a fortification from World War II

Przyborów is located in a valley of the Żywiec Beskids mountains, on the Koszarawa mountain river (a tributary of the Soła).

The village is of tourist interest due to the trail that starts here towards Mędralowa, Babia Góra and other local peaks.
