= Sopotnia Mała =

- Village
- Location within Poland
- Coordinates: 49°36′N 19°16′E
- Country: Poland
- Voivodeship: Silesian
- County: Żywiec
- Gmina: Jeleśnia
- Population: 1,251

Sopotnia Mała [sɔˈpɔtɲa ˈmawa] is a village in the administrative district of Gmina Jeleśnia, within Żywiec County, Silesian Voivodeship, in southern Poland.

== History ==
Following the 1939 Invasion of Poland, which started World War II, Sopotnia Mała was occupied by Nazi Germany and annexed to the German Province of Upper Silesia. The Red Army captured the village on 10 February 1945, ending the Nazi occupation.
