= Krzyżówki, Silesian Voivodeship =

Krzyżówki
- Village
- Location within Poland
- Coordinates: 49°35′8″N 19°22′48″E
- Country: Poland
- Voivodeship: Silesian
- County: Żywiec
- Gmina: Jeleśnia
- Population: 269

Krzyżówki [kʂɨˈʐufki] is a village in the administrative district of Gmina Jeleśnia, within Żywiec County, Silesian Voivodeship, in southern Poland, near the border with Slovakia.
