= Gmina Jeleśnia =

Gmina Jeleśnia Jeleśnia Commune
- Gmina
- Flag Coat of arms

- Coordinates (Jeleśnia): 49°39′N 19°19′E
- Country: Poland
- Voivodeship: Silesian
- County: Żywiec
- Seat: Jeleśnia

Area
  - Total: 170.51 km^{2} (65.83 sq mi)

Population (2019-06-30)
  - Total: 13,283
  - Density: 77.902/km^{2} (201.76/sq mi)
- Website: http://www.jelesnia.pl

Gmina Jeleśnia is a rural gmina (administrative district) in Żywiec County, Silesian Voivodeship, in southern Poland. Its seat is the village of Jeleśnia, which lies approximately 10 kilometres (6 mi) south-east of Żywiec and 71 km (44 mi) south of the regional capital Katowice.

The gmina covers an area of 170.51 square kilometres (65.8 sq mi), and as of 2019 its total population is 13,283.

== Villages ==
Gmina Jeleśnia contains the villages and settlements of Jeleśnia, Korbielów, Krzyżowa, Krzyżówki, Mutne, Pewel Wielka, Przyborów, Sopotnia Mała and Sopotnia Wielka.

== Neighbouring gminas ==
Gmina Jeleśnia is bordered by the gminas of Koszarawa, Radziechowy-Wieprz, Stryszawa, Świnna, Ujsoły and Węgierska Górka.
