= Krzyżowa, Silesian Voivodeship =

Krzyżowa
- Village
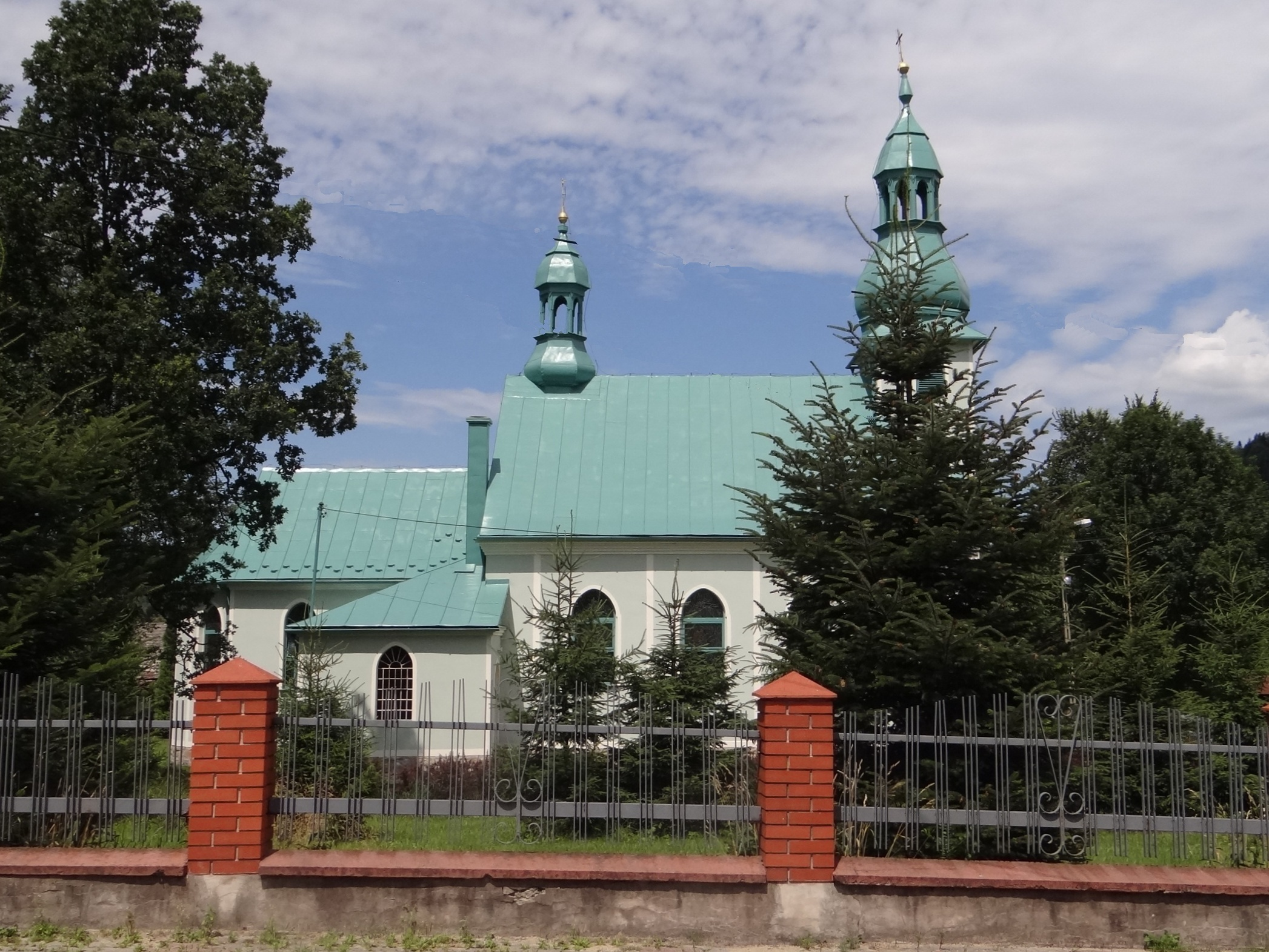
- A local Catholic church

- Location within Poland
- Coordinates: 49°36′14″N 19°19′37″E
- Country: Poland
- Voivodeship: Silesian
- County: Żywiec
- Gmina: Jeleśnia
- Highest elevation: 550 m (1,800 ft)
- Lowest elevation: 480 m (1,570 ft)
- Population: 1,444

Krzyżowa [kʂɨˈʐɔva] is a village in the administrative district of Gmina Jeleśnia, within Żywiec County, Silesian Voivodeship, in southern Poland.
