= Mutne =

- Village
- Location within Poland
- Coordinates: 49°39′N 19°18′E
- Country: Poland
- Voivodeship: Silesian
- County: Żywiec
- Gmina: Jeleśnia
- Population: 457

Mutne [ˈmutnɛ] is a village in the administrative district of Gmina Jeleśnia, within Żywiec County, Silesian Voivodeship, in southern Poland.
