= Jeleśnia =

- Village
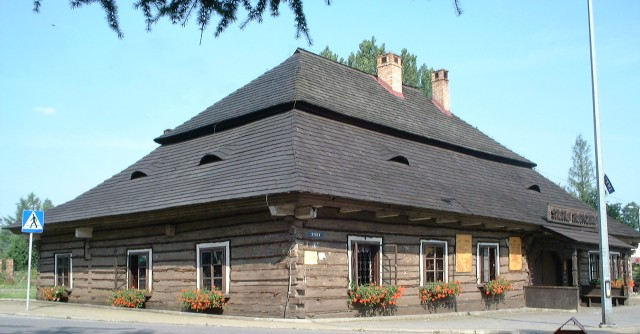
- Old Inn in Jeleśnia

- Location within Poland
- Coordinates: 49°38′30″N 19°19′37″E
- Country: Poland
- Voivodeship: Silesian
- County: Żywiec
- Gmina: Jeleśnia
- Population: 4,098

Jeleśnia [jɛˈlɛɕɲa] is a village in Żywiec County, Silesian Voivodeship, in southern Poland. It is the seat of the gmina (administrative district) called Gmina Jeleśnia. The village belongs to Lesser Poland. Together with Żywiec, for hundreds of years it was administratively tied with the city of Kraków. Jeleśnia is located on two rivers, Sopotnia and Koszarawa, among the mountains and hills of Beskidy. The area of the gmina is 13,845 hectares, and it is largely covered by forests, with several protected areas, such as one around Pilsko.

== History ==
First written mentions of Jeleśnia come from the 16th century. At that time, the area of the village was sparsely populated, and local noblemen would frequently fight each other, using gangs of highwaymen. The area of the future Żywiec County belonged to the Komorowski family, then it was divided among other families, such as the Wielopolskis. Until 1772 (see Partitions of Poland), Jeleśnia belonged to Kraków Voivodeship. From 1772 to 1918, it was part of Austrian province of Galicia.

In the Second Polish Republic, Jeleśnia again belonged to Kraków Voivodeship. Following the 1939 Invasion of Poland, which started World War II, Jeleśnia was occupied by Nazi Germany and annexed to the German Province of Upper Silesia. The Red Army captured the village on 10 February 1945, ending the Nazi occupation.

From 1945 to 1975, it returned to Kraków Voivodeship. In 1975 the village was transferred to Bielsko-Biała Voivodeship, where it remained until 1 January 1999.
