= Nohfelden =

- Municipality
- Coat of arms

- Location of Nohfelden within Sankt Wendel district
- Interactive map of Nohfelden
- Location within Germany Location within Saarland
- Coordinates: 49°34′N 7°9′E
- Country: Germany
- State: Saarland
- District: Sankt Wendel
- Subdivisions: 12

Government
  - Mayor (2019–29): Andreas Veit (CDU)

Area
  - Total: 100.71 km^{2} (38.88 sq mi)
- Elevation: 382 m (1,253 ft)

Population (2025-12-31)
  - Total: 9,874
  - Density: 98.04/km^{2} (253.9/sq mi)
- Time zone: UTC+01:00 (CET)
  - Summer (DST): UTC+02:00 (CEST)
- Postal codes: 66621–66625
- Dialling codes: 06852, 06875
- Vehicle registration: WND
- Website: www.nohfelden.de

Nohfelden is a municipality in the district of Sankt Wendel, in Saarland, Germany. It is situated approximately 15 kilometres (9.3 mi) north of Sankt Wendel, and 20 kilometres (12 mi) southwest of Idar-Oberstein. It was formed during administrative reform in January 1974 from the merger of 13 previously independent municipalities.

== Geography ==
=== Communities ===
District	Inhabitants
Bosen	1,220
Eckelhausen	229
Eisen	492
Eiweiler	809
Gonnesweiler	894
Mosberg-Richweiler	375
Neunkirchen	865
Nohfelden	1,126
Selbach	778
Sötern	1,235
Türkismühle	732
Walhausen	619
Wolfersweiler	1,017

Population figures as of January 2012. The communities of Bosen and Eckelhausen form a common district Bosen/Eckelhausen.

Nohfelden is located in the Hunsrück-Hochwald National Park.

=== Climate ===
Monthly rainfall in Türkismühle

The annual rainfall is 1,205 millimetres (47.4 in), which is in the upper tenth of the values recorded by the measuring stations of the German Weather Service. The driest month is April; It rains the most in December. The rainiest month is about 1.8 times rainier than the driest month. The seasonal precipitation fluctuations are in the upper third in Germany.

== History ==
Surface finds from the Celtic and Roman times were discovered or excavated in Bosen, Eisen, Eiweiler, Mosberg-Richweiler, Neunkirchen (Nahe), Nohfelden, Selbach, Sötern, Türkismühle, Walhausen and Wolfersweiler. The Nohfelden castle was first mentioned in 1286 and a Nohfelden magistracy in 1372.

Since the early Middle Ages (around 1200) until July 1879 and in the years 1946/47, when Nohfelden was moved from Rhineland-Palatinate to Saarland, the historical development of the 13 districts has differed. Around 1790, lordship was divided among the following four areas:

- The Duchy of Palatine Zweibrücken, which evolved from the County of Veldenz in the 15th century, containing Eckelhausen, Eisen, Mosberg-Richweiler, Nohfelden, (Türkismühle), Walhausen, and Wolfersweiler,
- The Imperial Lordship of Eberswald with associated towns of Bosen and Sötern,
- The Imperial Lordship of Dagstuhl with the associated village of Eiweiler,
- The High Court of Neunkirchen including Gonnesweiler, Neunkirchen, and Selbach.

The French Revolution and the following occupation of the entire left bank of the Rhine in 1794 abolished the four lordships. New administrative divisions were created under French rule. The 13 districts of the municipality Nohfelden belonged to the Saar Department and were assigned to five Mairien (mayoralties):

After the defeat of Napoleon in October 1813, France reverted to its boundaries of January 1, 1792 by peace treaty. Among others all communities in present-day Nohfelden were assigned to the newly formed principality of Birkenfeld.

The Principality of Birkenfeld was divided into the three districts Birkenfeld, Oberstein, and Nohfelden. Each district comprised 3 mayoralties (Bürgermeisterei). The district of Nohfelden consisted of three mayoralties: Nohfelden, Neunkirchen, and Achtelsbach.

In 1819 the Duchy of Saxe-Coburg named the territory it had received adjacent to the Principality of Birkenfeld as the Principality of Lichtenberg, based in Sankt Wendel, however, it was already ceded to the Kingdom of Prussia. The Principality of Birkenfeld was now completely surrounded by the Prussian Rhine Province.

As a result of the abdication and the renunciation of the succession to the throne of Frederick Augustus II, Grand Duke of Oldenburg on November 11, 1918, the Principality became the Birkenfeld district of the Rhine Province. The Saar region was separated from Germany and now administered by France.

In 1935 the Saar was reunited with the German Reich under the name "Saarland", once again shuffling the administrative areas.

The end of the Second World War in 1945 ushered in another substantial reorganization. Bosen, Eckelhausen, Eisen, Eiweiler, Gonnesweiler, Hirstein, Mosberg-Richweiler, Neunkirchen, Schwarzenbach, Selbach, Sötern, Steinberg-Deckenhardt, Türkismühle, and Walhausen were assigned to the new "Amt" Türkismühle in the Sankt Wendel district. In the joint meeting the mayors of all the towns, with the exception of Hirstein, supported the establishment of a new administrative grouping headquartered in Türkismühle, in the absence of suitable facilities for the temporary administrative headquarters in Gonnesweiler. Due to its geographic location Hirstein preferred a connection to the Namborn. In 1947 the municipality of Hirstein was spun off from the district of Türkismühle and incorporated into the administrative district of Namborn.

With the Restructuring Act of 1973, the formerly independent communities were united. The legal successor of the Nohfelden Amt was the municipality (Gemeinde) of Nohfelden with the 13 districts: Bosen, Eckelhausen, Eisen, Eiweiler, Gonnesweiler, Mosberg-Richweiler, Neunkirchen, Nohfelden, Selbach, Sötern, Türkismühle, Walhausen and Wolfersweiler.

== Community partnerships ==
Since 1996 Nohfelden has been a partner municipality with Jeleśnia, Poland. In April 2006 ten years of partnership was celebrated in Nohfelden with a large delegation from Jelesnia.

== Culture and points of interest ==
Jewish cemeteries: In Gonnesweiler and Sötern are two of the oldest Jewish cemeteries in Saarland (created around 1800). During the National Socialist era the cemeteries were damaged and numerous gravestones removed.

Englischer Garten in Gonnesweiler: A landscaped garden, which was created in English style, leads past the Nepomuk Chapel and offers a circular route, which is also suitable for wheelchair users.

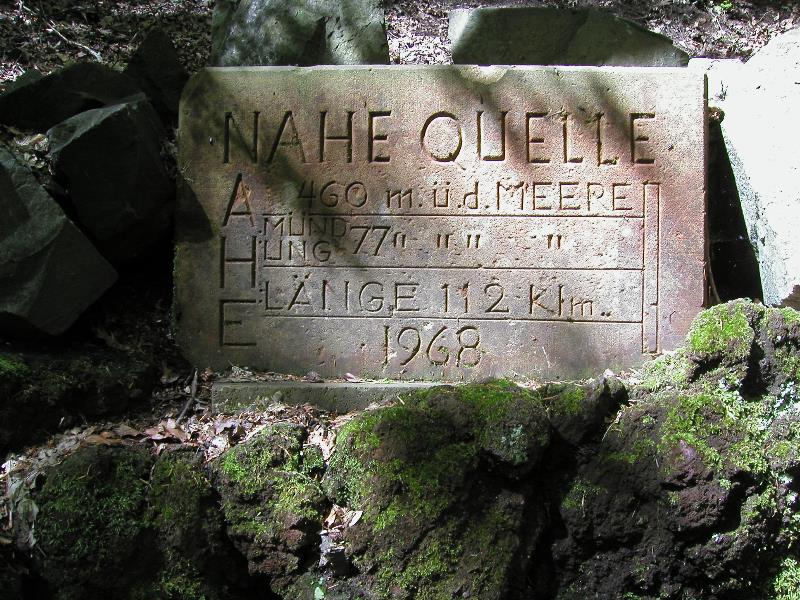
Nahequelle in Selbach

Nahequelle with wild area: This is the source of the river Nahe. The Nahequelle is the starting point for the Nahequelle path. It has wild area with animals such as peacocks, goats, ducks, geese and deer.

Hinkelstein Walhausen: An old menhir in Walhausen, dating back to 2000–1800 BC. According to legend, buried under the multi-ton Hinkelstein is a golden carriage with the war chest of Attila the Hun.

Schaumeiler in Walhausen: The kiln, built in 1998, recalls the pre-industrial production of charcoal.

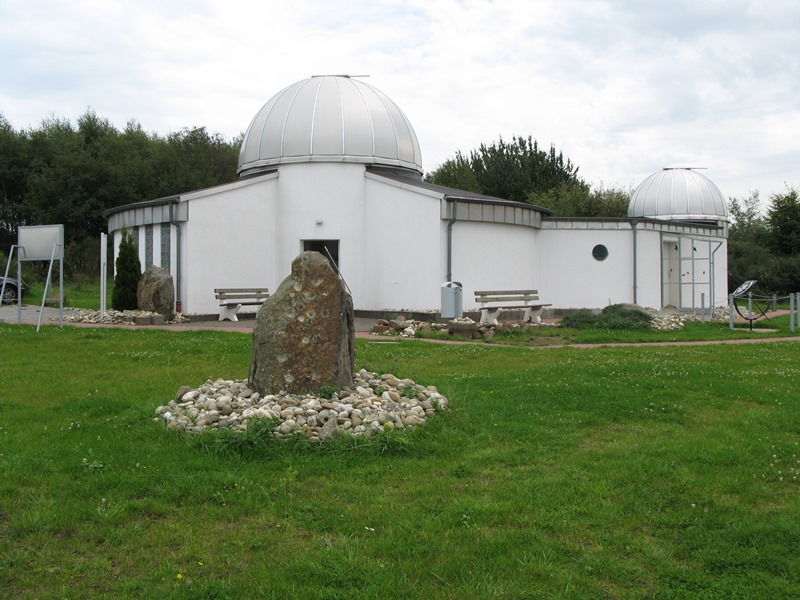
Peterberg observatory

Peterberg observatory: On the 584 metres (1,916 ft)-high Peterberg amateur astronomers have the opportunity to gain insights into the infinite galaxy.

Street of Sculptures: The street of sculptures, started by Leo Kornbrust in 1972 stretches over a distance of around 25 kilometres (16 mi). The Street of Sculptures also passes the Bostalsee.

=== Museums ===
Museum of Fashion and Costume (Museum für Mode und Tracht): The only museum in the Saarland that deals with historic clothing and fashion. Currently clothing and fashions are displayed with the accompanying underwear and accessories from 1845 to 1920. Approximately 200 exhibits are displayed on an exhibition area of 123 m2. The Saarland Folk Dance and Traditional Costume Association opened the museum in Nohfelden in September 2005. It is located in the old Amtshaus at the castle.

=== Historic buildings ===
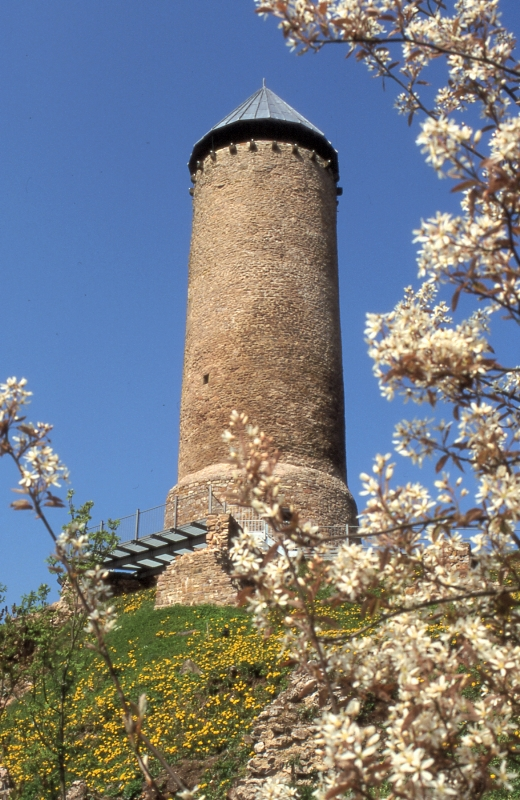
Nohfelden Castle in the spring

Nohfelden Castle (Veldenz Castle): The Nohfelden landmark, built in 1285 by Wilhelm Bossel von Stein. After a restoration, only the 20-meter-high keep can be seen, which serves as a lookout tower. Numerous events take place annually at the castle. The castle summer season starts on May 1 and lasts until October.

Wolfersweiler Protestant church: A historic church from 1788 whose tower foundations date back to the 12th century. The tower itself is from 1586. It is a simple village church with old wooden stalls and a Stumm organ from 1834. Guided tours of church and organ are offered and there are regular concerts. From May to October, the church is open during the day. In the winter months it is possible to visit by appointment.

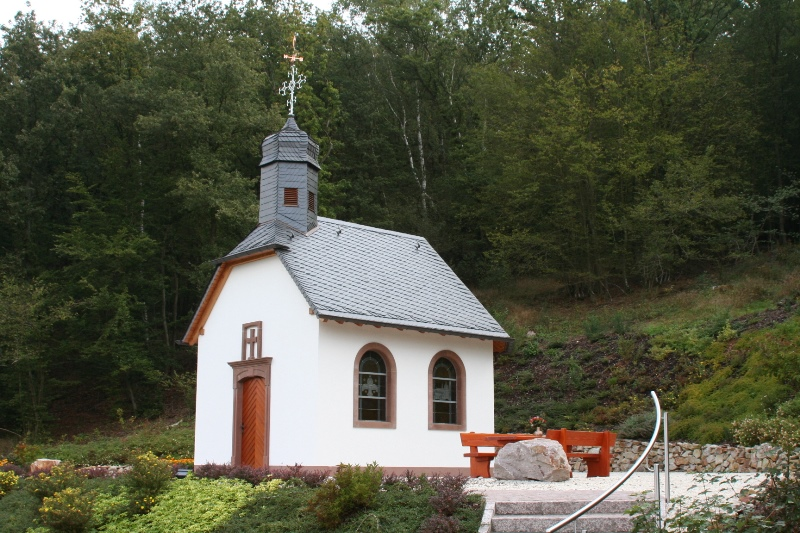
St. Nepomuk Chapel in Gonnesweiler

St. Nepomuk Chapel Gonnesweiler: In 1748m, the nobleman Florent Joseph de Latre de Feignis had the Nepomuk chapel built. This historic building, which survived even the French Revolution, had to be demolished in 1970, as the main street adjacent to the chapel was extended. Volunteer citizens of the Cultural Association began reconstructing the Nepomuk Chapel in 2005, but at a different location

Jagdgut Bocksborn zu Gonnesweiler: built in 1894 by the Saarbrücken engineer Fritz von Rexroth. It served as a residential, recreational and working accommodation, but above all to accommodate the hunting guests. Today it is a private residence.

Waldkapelle in Selbach: It is situated by the forest and cyclists and hikers come by to take a break and light a candle. It was built in 1954.

Kathreinenkapelle in Selbach: built in the 16th century and is the oldest surviving building in the municipality Nohfelden, it has the oldest surviving late baroque cross in the northern Saarland.

Peterbergkapelle Eiweiler: In 1983, today's Peterberg Chapel was built on the foundations of a dilapidated chapel.

== Recreation ==
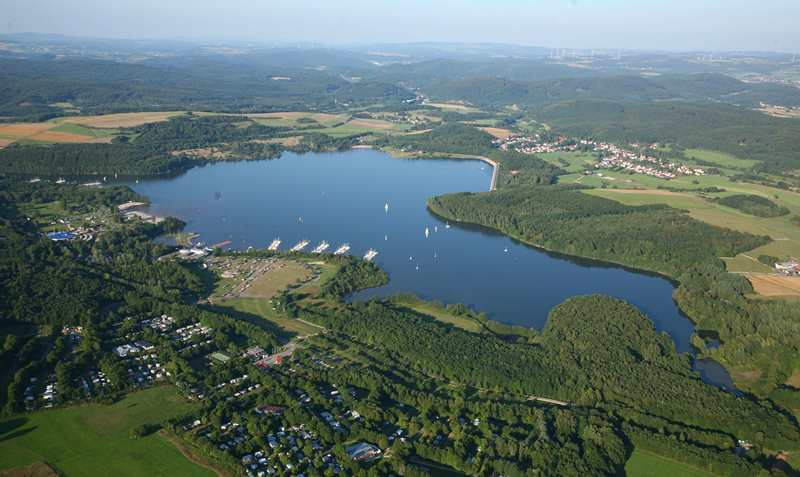
The Bostalsee

Bostalsee Recreation Center is used by surfing and sailing fans. In addition to hiking on the approximately 7 kilometres (4.3 mi) long circular route, there are also opportunities along the lake to fish, swim, row, dive or pedal boat on the lake.

Center Parks Bostalsee Built in 2013, Center Parks is located directly on the 120-hectare Bostalsee. In addition to indoor miniature golf there is also a miniature golf course located directly on the water. High wire course, archery, petting zoo, swimming pool and bowling activities attract visitors.

Golfpark Bostalsee in Eisen Golfpark Eisen offers a beginner's course and 3 public courses. The park is situated 5 kilometres (3.1 mi) away from the Bostalsee. It extends over a wide area with pond and habitat areas, open streams, bunkers and green areas.

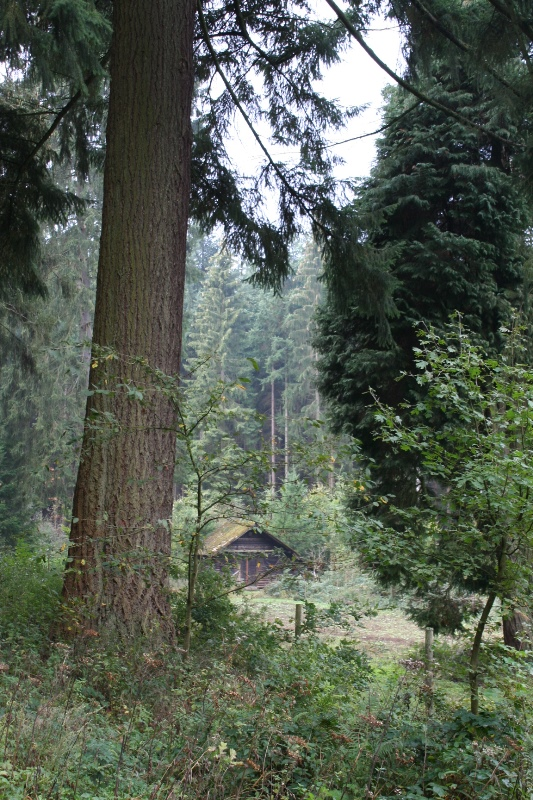
The Buchwald in Nohfelden

Buchwald in Nohfelden The 250-year-old larch, a charcoal kiln, and the largest Douglas fir in southwest Germany are in the extensive Beech forest. In addition, hikers and cyclists can explore the region using the signage.

Biergarten and Bosiland The former event hall has now been converted into an indoor playground. Located directly on the Bosiland is a Bavarian-style beer garden with 3500 seats.

== Transportation ==
The community is crossed by the A62 motorway which, with the interchange Nohfelden-Türkismühle, has the connectivity to the local road network. The B41 is also a heavily traveled federal highway through the town. The international airports of Saarbrücken, Zweibrücken and Frankfurt-Hahn can be reached by car in less than an hour.

The Türkismühle station provides a connection to the Nahe Valley Railway (Nahetalbahn) on the Saarbrücken-Frankfurt/Main route. It is less than two hours the Frankfurt airport by train, and around 45 minutes to Saarbrücken.

== Notable people ==
- Dominik Schröder (1910-1974), Ethnologist and missionary
- Clemens Ganz (b. January 18, 1935), professor and organist at Cologne Cathedral
