= Broszkowice =

- Village
- Coat of arms

- Location within Poland
- Coordinates: 50°3′23″N 19°13′59″E
- Country: Poland
- Voivodeship: Lesser Poland
- County: Oświęcim
- Gmina: Oświęcim
- First mentioned: 1427
- Elevation: 237 m (778 ft)
- Population: 595
- Time zone: UTC+1 (CET)
  - Summer (DST): UTC+2 (CEST)
- Vehicle registration: KOS

Broszkowice [brɔʂkɔˈvit͡sɛ] is a village in the administrative district of Gmina Oświęcim, within Oświęcim County, Lesser Poland Voivodeship, in southern Poland. It is located on the Vistula river.

== History ==
In the 10th century, the area became part of the emerging Polish state. Following the fragmentation of Poland, it was located within several provincial duchies, incl. the Duchy of Oświęcim, formed in 1315, which later on fell under Bohemian suzerainty as a fief. The village was mentioned in 1427. It belonged then to the Duchy of Oświęcim, a fee of the Kingdom of Bohemia. In 1457 Jan IV of Oświęcim agreed to sell the duchy to the Polish Crown, and in the accompanying document issued on 21 February the village was mentioned as Sbroszkowicze.

The territory of the Duchy of Oświęcim was eventually incorporated directly into Poland in 1564 and formed the Silesian County in the Kraków Voivodeship in the Lesser Poland Province. Upon the First Partition of Poland in 1772 it was annexed by Austria, and made part of its newly formed Kingdom of Galicia. After World War I and the fall of Austria-Hungary it became again part of Poland, as the nation regained independence.

Following the joint German-Soviet invasion of Poland, which started World War II in September 1939, the village was occupied and annexed by Nazi Germany. In connection with the construction of the Auschwitz II-Birkenau death camp in nearby Brzezinka, in 1941, the occupiers expelled the entire Polish population of the village, which was initially deported to the nearby Pszczyna County, and afterwards either enslaved as forced labour or deported to the General Government in the more eastern part of German-occupied Poland. After the war, the village was restored to Poland.
