= Pławy =

- Village
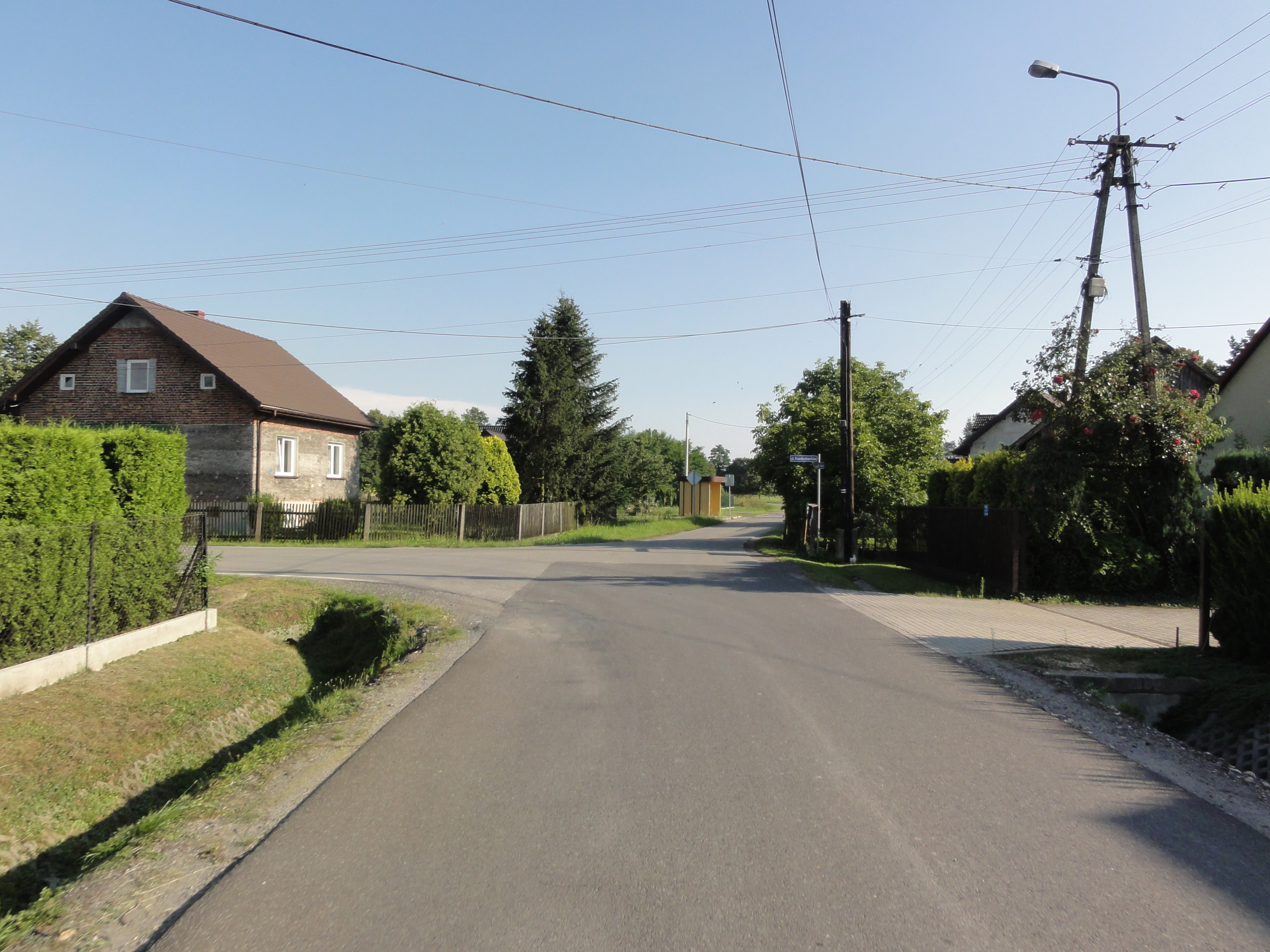

- Coat of arms

- Location within Poland
- Coordinates: 50°2′N 19°9′E
- Country: Poland
- Voivodeship: Lesser Poland
- County: Oświęcim
- Gmina: Oświęcim
- First mentioned: 1272
- Elevation: 240 m (790 ft)
- Population: 350
- Time zone: UTC+1 (CET)
  - Summer (DST): UTC+2 (CEST)
- Vehicle registration: KOS

Pławy [ˈpwavɨ] is a village in the administrative district of Gmina Oświęcim, within Oświęcim County, Lesser Poland Voivodeship, in southern Poland.

== History ==
The village was first mentioned in 1272 as Francisci in a Latin document issued by Władysław of Opole which endowed the village of Rajsko, lying close to Pławy, to Herman Surnagel in order to resettle it under German law. The primordial name of the village Franciszowice evolved later into Pławy.

Politically it belonged then to the Duchy of Opole and Racibórz and the Castellany of Oświęcim, which was in 1315 formed in the process of feudal fragmentation of Poland into the Duchy of Oświęcim, ruled by a local branch of Silesian Piast dynasty. In 1327 the duchy became a fee of the Kingdom of Bohemia. In 1457 Jan IV of Oświęcim agreed to sell the duchy to the Polish Crown, and in the accompanying document issued on 21 February the village was mentioned as Franczyschowicze.

The territory of the Duchy of Oświęcim was eventually incorporated directly into Poland in 1564 and formed the Silesian County in the Kraków Voivodeship in the Lesser Poland Province. Upon the First Partition of Poland in 1772 it was annexed by Austria, and made part of its newly formed Kingdom of Galicia. After World War I and the fall of Austria-Hungary it became again part of Poland, as the nation regained independence.

Following the joint German-Soviet invasion of Poland, which started World War II in September 1939, the village was occupied and annexed by Nazi Germany. In connection with the construction of the Auschwitz II-Birkenau death camp in nearby Brzezinka, in 1941, the occupiers expelled the entire Polish population of the village, which was initially deported to the nearby Pszczyna County, and afterwards either enslaved as forced labour or deported to the General Government in the more eastern part of German-occupied Poland. In 1944–1945, the German occupying administration operated a subcamp of the Auschwitz concentration camp in the village. Hundreds of people, both men and women, incl. Jews, Poles and Russians, were subjected to forced labour in the subcamp. On January 18, 1945, the subcamp was evacuated during a death march to Wodzisław Śląski, and then the surviving prisoners were deported to Germany. After the war, the village was restored to Poland.
