= Włosienica, Lesser Poland Voivodeship =

Włosienica
- Village
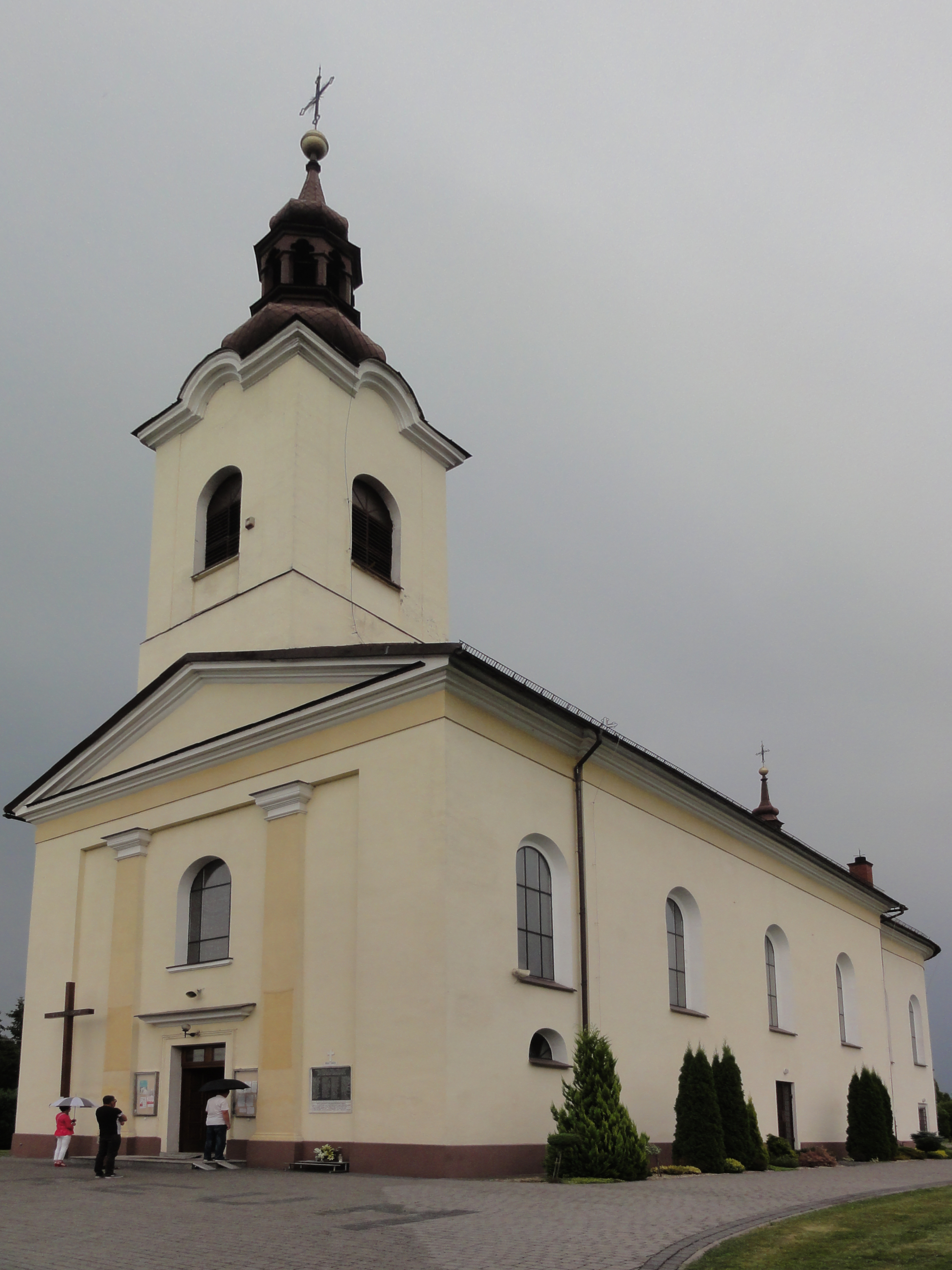
- Church

- Coat of arms

- Location within Poland
- Coordinates: 50°1′N 19°19′E
- Country: Poland
- Voivodeship: Lesser Poland
- County: Oświęcim
- Gmina: Oświęcim
- First mentioned: 1285
- Elevation: 240 m (790 ft)
- Population: 1,491

Włosienica [vwɔɕɛˈnit͡sa] is a village in the administrative district of Gmina Oświęcim, within Oświęcim County, Lesser Poland Voivodeship, in southern Poland.

== History ==
The village was first mentioned in 1285 in the document allowing komes Adam to establish a new village Sępnia (contemporary Poręba Wielka), which would lay close to Włosienica. In 1345 a church in a village of Villa Hertmani is mentioned, which was an alleged name of Włosienica, as it could have belonged to a nearby castellan named Herman (1304-1317). Since 1470 to the 20th century the village was endowed to Oświęcim Catholich parish.

Politically it belonged initially to the Duchy of Racibórz and the Castellany of Oświęcim, which was in 1315 formed in the process of feudal fragmentation of Poland into the Duchy of Oświęcim, ruled by a local branch of Silesian Piast dynasty. In 1327 the duchy became a fee of the Kingdom of Bohemia. In 1457 Jan IV of Oświęcim agreed to sell the duchy to the Polish Crown, and in the accompanying document issued on 21 February the village was mentioned as Włoszenycza.

The territory of the Duchy of Oświęcim was eventually incorporated into Poland in 1564 and formed Silesian County of Kraków Voivodeship. Upon the First Partition of Poland in 1772 it became part of the Austrian Kingdom of Galicia. After World War I and fall of Austria-Hungary it became part of Poland. It was annexed by Nazi Germany at the beginning of World War II, and afterwards it was restored to Poland.
