= Harmęże =

- Village
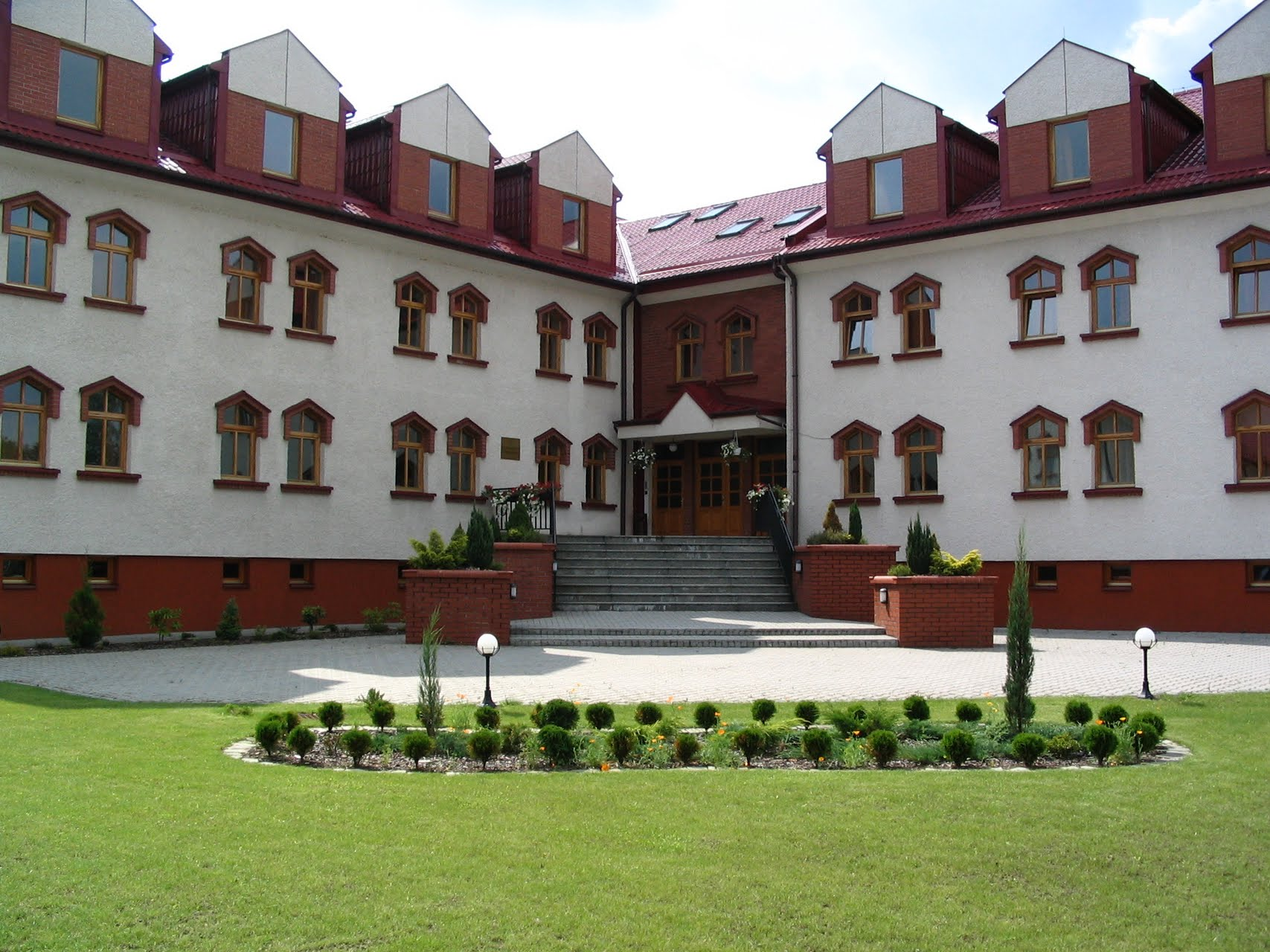
- Monastery in Harmęże

- Coat of arms

- Location within Poland
- Coordinates: 50°1′N 19°9′E
- Country: Poland
- Voivodeship: Lesser Poland
- County: Oświęcim
- Gmina: Oświęcim
- First mentioned: 1368
- Elevation: 240 m (790 ft)
- Population: 613
- Time zone: UTC+1 (CET)
  - Summer (DST): UTC+2 (CEST)
- Vehicle registration: KOS

Harmęże [xarˈmɛ̃ʐɛ] is a village in the administrative district of Gmina Oświęcim, within Oświęcim County, Lesser Poland Voivodeship, in southern Poland.

Marian Kołodziej's artwork, The Labyrinth, is displayed in the basement of St. Maximilian Kolbe Centre in Harmęże.

== History ==
The village was first mentioned in 1368. Politically the village belonged then to the Duchy of Oświęcim, formed in 1315 in the process of feudal fragmentation of Poland and was ruled by a local branch of Piast dynasty. In 1327 the duchy became a fee of the Kingdom of Bohemia. In 1457 Jan IV of Oświęcim agreed to sell the duchy to the Polish Crown, and in the accompanying document issued on 21 February the village was mentioned as Charmaszy.

The territory of the Duchy of Oświęcim was eventually incorporated directly into Poland in 1564 and formed the Silesian County in the Kraków Voivodeship in the Lesser Poland Province. Upon the First Partition of Poland in 1772 it was annexed by Austria, and made part of its newly formed Kingdom of Galicia. In the late 19th century, the village had a population of 360, entirely Catholic by confession. After World War I and the fall of Austria-Hungary it became again part of Poland, as the nation regained independence.

Following the joint German-Soviet invasion of Poland, which started World War II in September 1939, the village was occupied and annexed by Nazi Germany. In connection with the construction of the Auschwitz II-Birkenau death camp in nearby Brzezinka, in 1941, the occupiers expelled the entire Polish population of the village, which was initially deported to the nearby Pszczyna County, and afterwards either enslaved as forced labour or deported to the General Government in the more eastern part of German-occupied Poland. Afterwards, the Germans established and operated two subcamps of the Auschwitz concentration camp, in which men and women were imprisoned as slave labour. The men's subcamp was operated in 1941–1943 and held ethnic Polish prisoners, before it was dissolved and the prisoners moved to another location. The women's subcamp was operated in 1942–1945, and after its dissolution the prisoners were deported to concentration camps in Germany. After the war, the village was restored to Poland.
