= Babice, Oświęcim County =

Babice
- Village
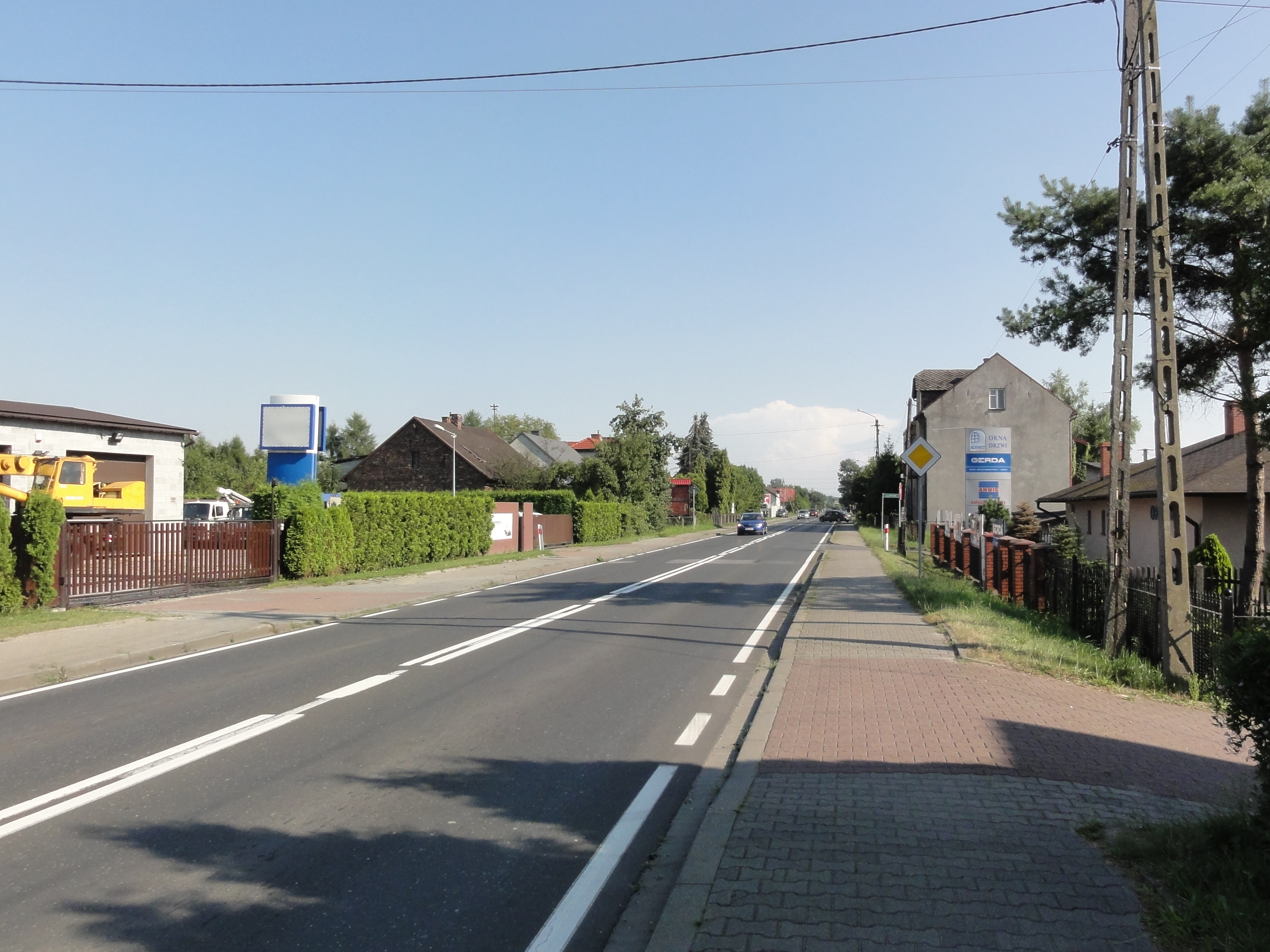

- Coat of arms

- Location within Poland
- Coordinates: 50°03′13.6″N 19°12′04″E
- Country: Poland
- Voivodeship: Lesser Poland
- County: Oświęcim
- Gmina: Oświęcim
- First mentioned: 1314
- Elevation: 238 m (781 ft)
- Population: 1,582
- Time zone: UTC+1 (CET)
  - Summer (DST): UTC+2 (CEST)
- Vehicle registration: KOS

Babice (Polish pronunciation: [baˈbit͡sɛ]) is a village in the administrative district of Gmina Oświęcim, within Oświęcim County, Lesser Poland Voivodeship, in southern Poland.

== History ==
In the 10th century, the area became part of the emerging Polish state. Following the fragmentation of Poland, it was located within several provincial duchies, incl. the Duchy of Oświęcim, formed in 1315, which in 1327 became a fee of the Kingdom of Bohemia. The village was first mentioned in 1314. In the document of Jan IV of Oświęcim issued on 21 January 1457 in which the duke agreed to sell the Duchy of Oświęcim to the Crown of the Kingdom of Poland the village was mentioned as Babicze.

The territory of the Duchy of Oświęcim was eventually incorporated directly into Poland in 1564 and formed the Silesian County in the Kraków Voivodeship in the Lesser Poland Province. Upon the First Partition of Poland in 1772 it was annexed by Austria, and made part of its newly formed Kingdom of Galicia. After World War I and the fall of Austria-Hungary it became again part of Poland, as the nation regained independence.

Following the invasion of Poland in September 1939, the village was occupied and annexed by Nazi Germany. In connection with the construction of the Auschwitz II-Birkenau death camp in nearby Brzezinka, in 1941, the occupiers expelled the entire Polish population of the village, which was initially deported to the nearby Pszczyna County, and afterwards either enslaved as forced labour or deported to the General Government in the more eastern part of German-occupied Poland. A small subcamp of the Auschwitz concentration camp was located in the depopulated village from May 1943 to January 1945. The camp was mainly for agricultural work on an SS farm. There were 159 men prisoners as of 17 January 1945, and approximately 180 women prisoners of the summer of 1944. After the war, the village was restored to Poland.
