= Grojec, Oświęcim County =

Grojec
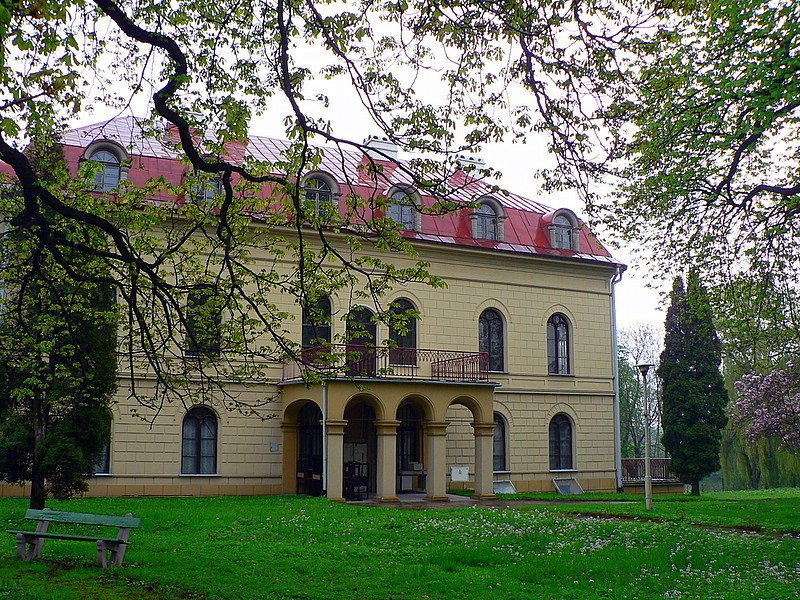
- Palace in Grojec

- Coat of arms

- Location within Poland
- Coordinates: 49°58′58″N 19°13′46″E
- Country: Poland
- Voivodeship: Lesser Poland
- County: Oświęcim
- Gmina: Oświęcim
- First mentioned: 1285

Population (2006)
  - Total: 2,923
- Time zone: UTC+1 (CET)
  - Summer (DST): UTC+2 (CEST)
- Postal code: 32-615
- Area code: +48 33
- Car plates: KOS

Grojec [ˈɡrɔjɛt͡s] is a historic village in Oświęcim County in Lesser Poland Voivodeship, in Poland.

== History ==
The village was first mentioned as Grozey in 1285 in the document allowing komes Adam to establish a new village Sępnia (contemporary Poręba Wielka), which would lay close to Grojec. It was later mentioned as Grodecz (1364), Grodicz (1442), Grodziecz (1537). The name indicates existence of a gord, of which traces can be found on a nearby hill.

Politically it belonged initially to the Duchy of Racibórz and the Castellany of Oświęcim, which was in 1315 formed in the process of feudal fragmentation of Poland into the Duchy of Oświęcim, ruled by a local branch of Silesian Piast dynasty. In 1327 the duchy became a fee of the Kingdom of Bohemia. In 1457 Jan IV of Oświęcim agreed to sell the duchy to the Polish Crown, and in the accompanying document issued on 21 February the village was mentioned as Grodecz.

The territory of the Duchy of Oświęcim was eventually incorporated into Poland in 1564 and formed Silesian County of Kraków Voivodeship. Upon the First Partition of Poland in 1772 it became part of the Austrian Kingdom of Galicia. After World War I and fall of Austria-Hungary it became part of Poland. It was annexed by Nazi Germany at the beginning of World War II, and afterwards it was restored to Poland.
