= Osada Stawy Grojeckie =

- Settlement
- Location within Poland
- Coordinates: 50°00′32″N 19°12′33″E
- Country: Poland
- Voivodeship: Lesser Poland
- County: Oświęcim
- Gmina: Oświęcim

Osada Stawy Grojeckie [ɔˈsada ˈstavɨ ɡrɔˈjɛt͡skʲɛ] is a settlement in the administrative district of Gmina Oświęcim, within Oświęcim County, Lesser Poland Voivodeship, in southern Poland.
