= Poręba Wielka =

Poręba Wielka may refer to:

- Poręba Wielka, Limanowa County in Lesser Poland Voivodeship (south Poland)
- Poręba Wielka, Oświęcim County in Lesser Poland Voivodeship (south Poland)
