= Zaborze, Oświęcim County =

Zaborze
- Village
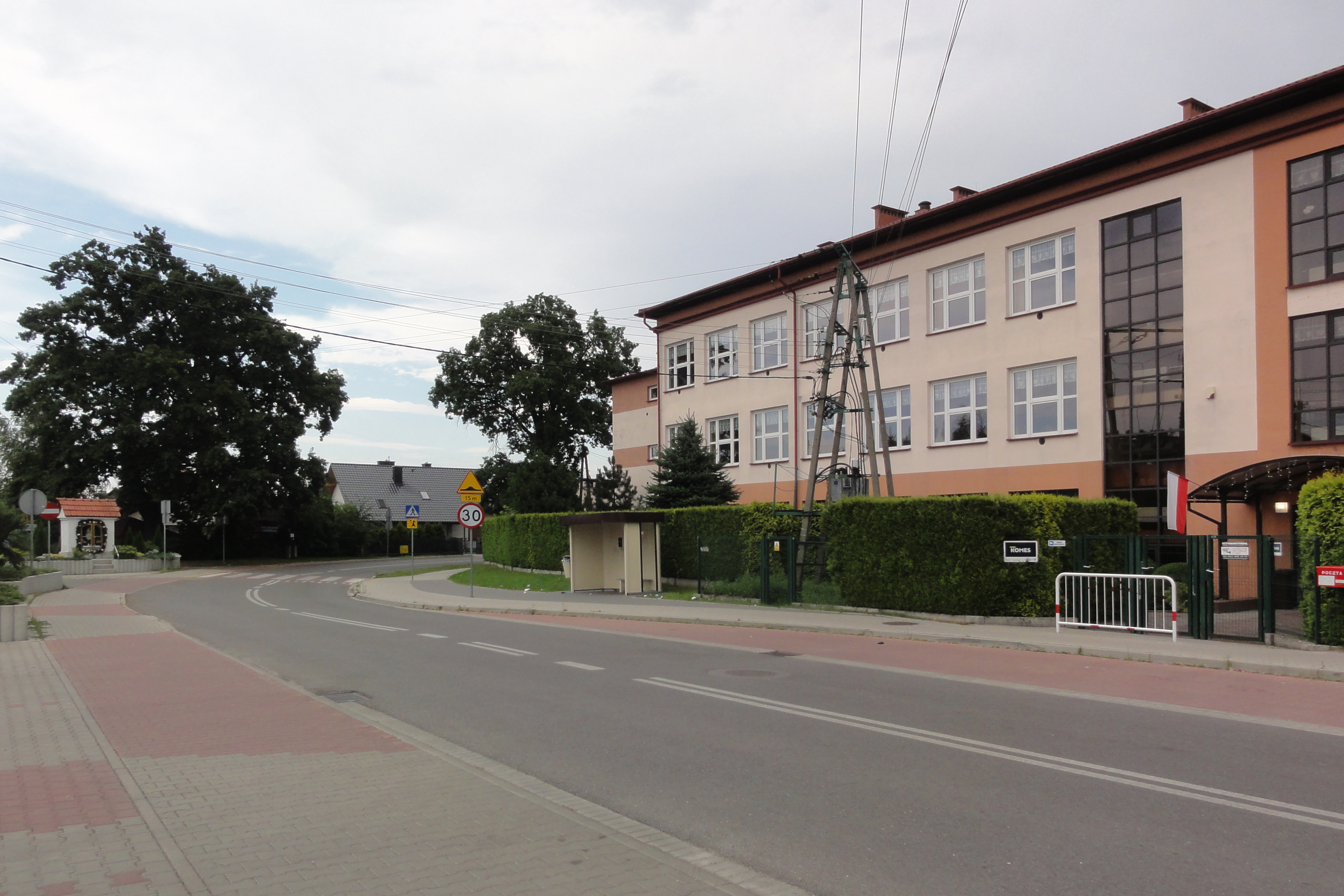
- School

- Location within Poland
- Coordinates: 50°0′47″N 19°14′6″E
- Country: Poland
- Voivodeship: Lesser Poland
- County: Oświęcim
- Gmina: Oświęcim
- Elevation: 250 m (820 ft)

Population
  - Total: 2,464

Zaborze [zaˈbɔʐɛ] is a village in the administrative district of Gmina Oświęcim, within Oświęcim County, Lesser Poland Voivodeship, in southern Poland.
