= Łazy, Oświęcim County =

Łazy
- Village
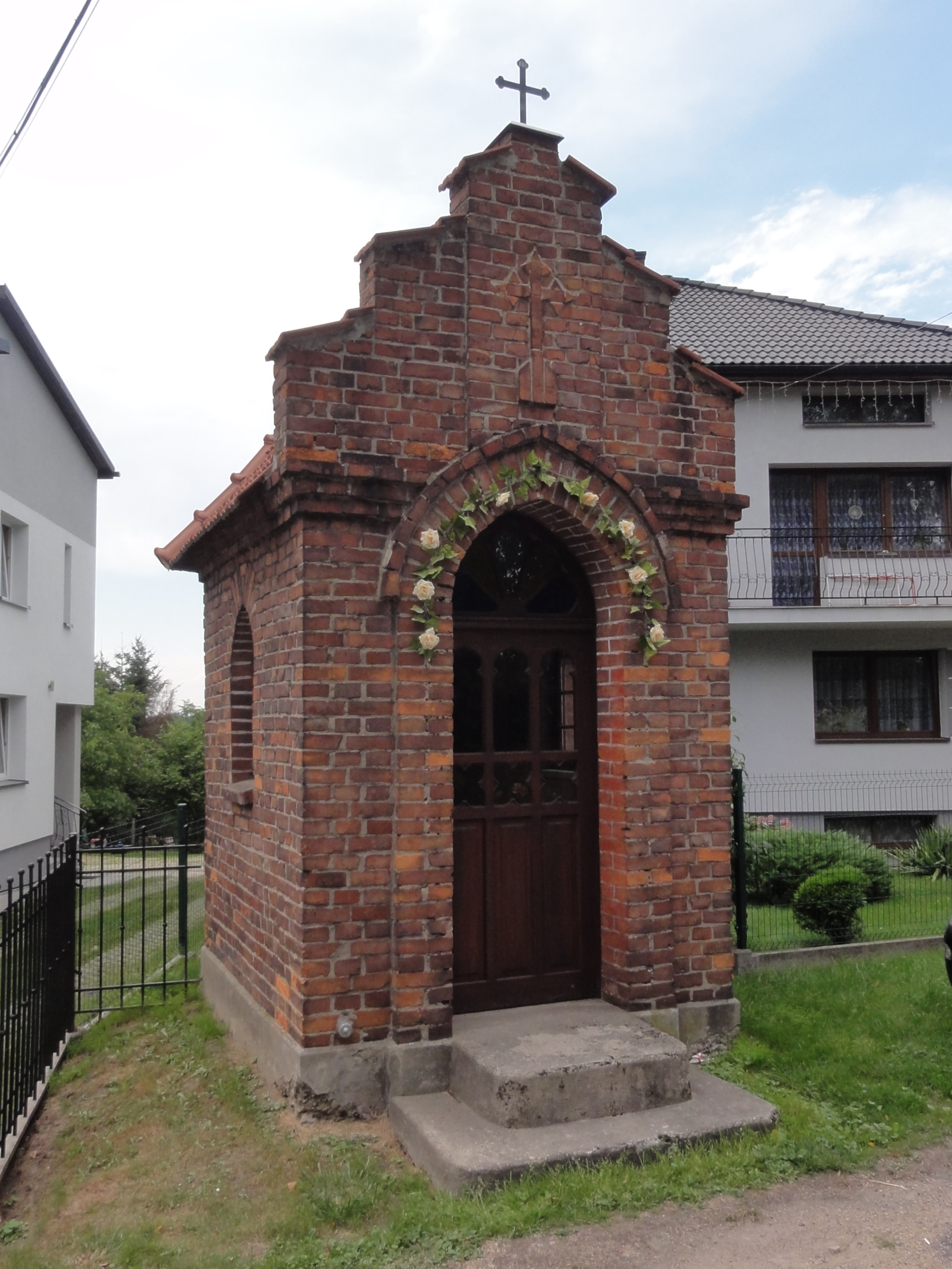
- Chapel

- Location within Poland
- Coordinates: 49°59′N 19°16′E
- Country: Poland
- Voivodeship: Lesser Poland
- County: Oświęcim
- Gmina: Oświęcim
- Population: 407

Łazy [ˈwazɨ] is a village in the administrative district of Gmina Oświęcim, within Oświęcim County, Lesser Poland Voivodeship, in southern Poland.
