= Dwory II =

- Village
- Location within Poland
- Coordinates: 50°2′53″N 19°19′37″E
- Country: Poland
- Voivodeship: Lesser Poland
- County: Oświęcim
- Gmina: Oświęcim
- Population: 330

Dwory II is a village in the administrative district of Gmina Oświęcim, within Oświęcim County, Lesser Poland Voivodeship, in southern Poland.
