= Stawy Monowskie =

- Village
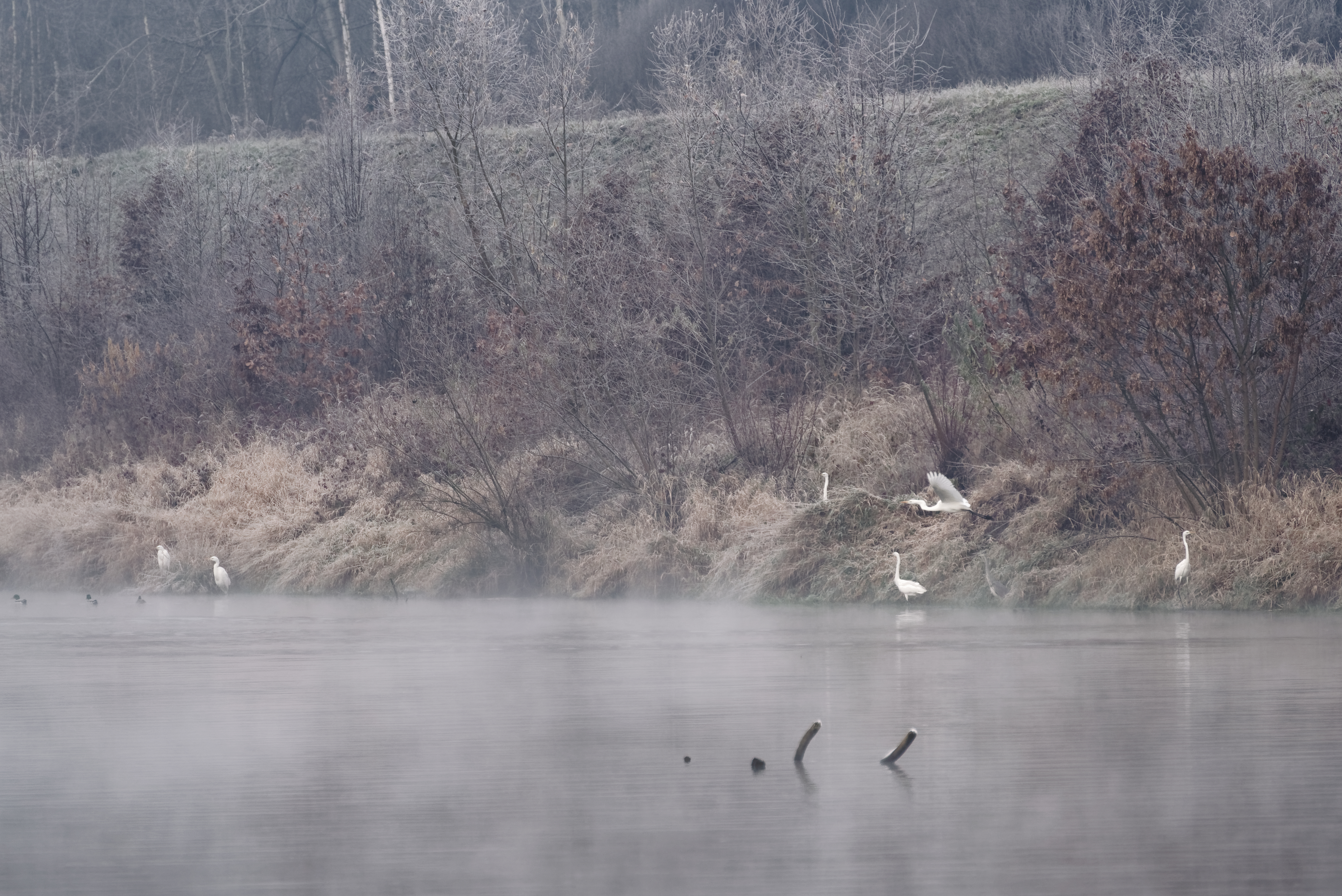
- Lake

- Location within Poland
- Coordinates: 50°1′N 19°20′E
- Country: Poland
- Voivodeship: Lesser Poland
- County: Oświęcim
- Gmina: Oświęcim
- Population (2006): 302

Stawy Monowskie [ˈstavɨ mɔˈnɔfskʲɛ] is a village in the administrative district of Gmina Oświęcim, within Oświęcim County, Lesser Poland Voivodeship, in southern Poland.
