= Igor Mitoraj =

Polish sculptor (1944–2014)

- Jerzy Mitoraj
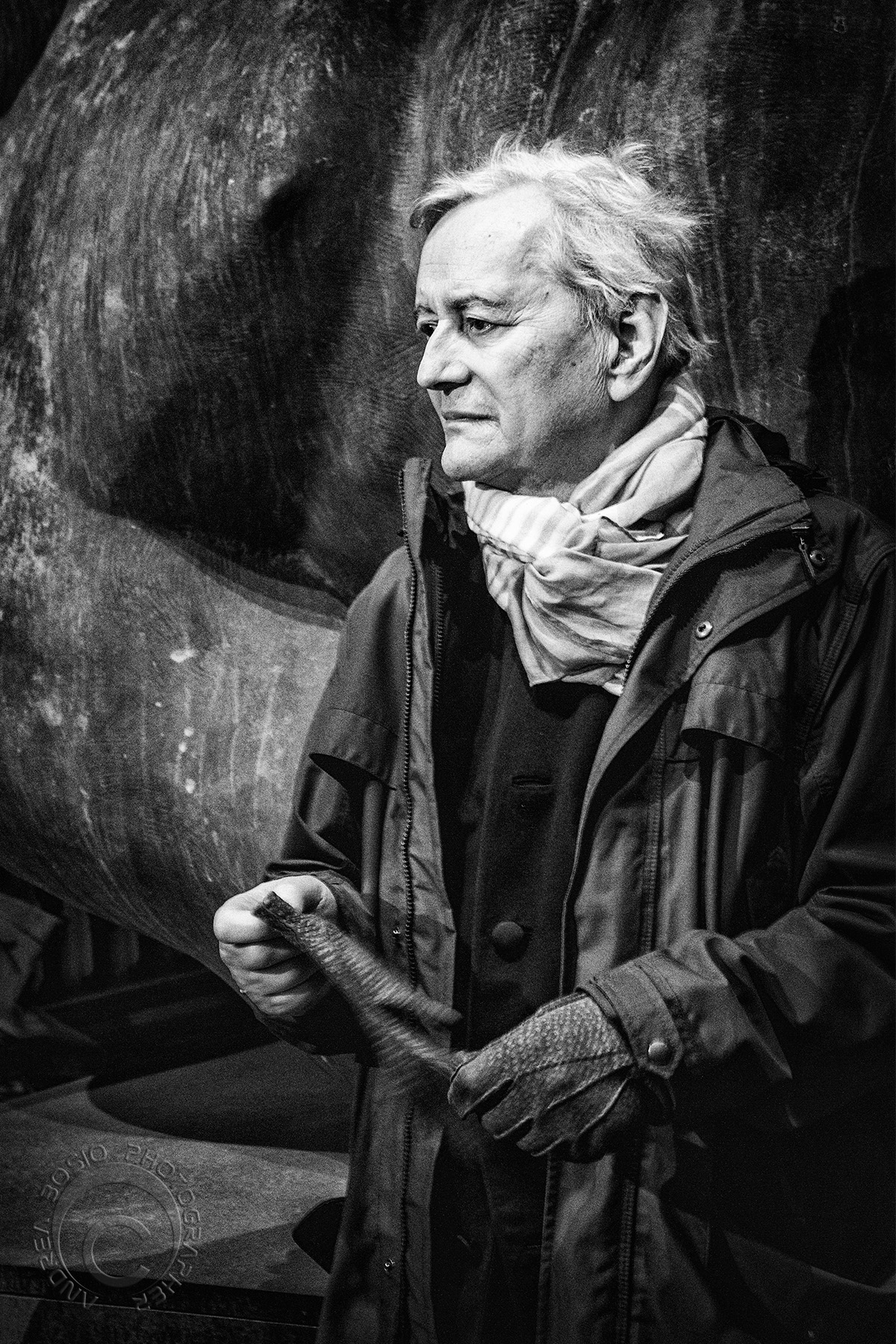
- Mitoraj in 2014
- Born: Jerzy Makina; 26 March 1944; Oederan, Germany
- Died: 6 October 2014 (aged 70); Paris, France
- Resting place: Pietrasanta, Italy
- Education: Kraków Academy of Art, Beaux-Arts de Paris
- Known for: Sculpture
- Notable work: Luci di Nara; Eros Bendato; Héros de Lumière
- Awards: Medal for Merit to Culture - Gloria Artis, Order of Polonia Restituta
- Elected: Doctor Honoris Causa of Jan Matejko Academy of Fine Arts

Igor Mitoraj (Polish pronunciation: [ˈiɡɔr miˈtɔraj]; 26 March 1944 – 6 October 2014), born Jerzy Makina, was a Polish artist and monumental sculptor. Known for his fragmented sculptures of the human body often created as large-scale installations in public places. His work is internationally exhibited, mainly in Europe.

== Biography ==
Mitoraj was born on 26 March 1944 in Oederan, Germany. His Polish mother, Zofia Makina, was a forced labourer, while his father was a French Foreign Legion officer of Polish extraction held as a POW. His parents' relationship was only fleeting and he returned with his mother to Poland after the end of World War II. He spent his childhood years in his grandparents' village of Grojec. When his mother married, both she and her son adopted the family name of the husband, Czesław Mitoraj. The surname in Polish happens to be a concatenation of the words for 'myth' and 'paradise'. He would later change his birth forename, 'Jerzy' (George) to "Igor" when he moved to France. He graduated from secondary art school in Bielsko-Biała and in 1963 entered the Kraków Academy of Art to study painting under Tadeusz Kantor. While a student he had several joint exhibitions, and held his first solo show in 1967 at the Krzysztofory Gallery in Poland. It seems doubtful that he graduated after only two years since in 1968, despite travel restrictions placed on ordinary people by the then Communist regime, he was somehow able to move to Paris, partly to seek out his biological father whom he failed to meet, and to continue his art studies at the École nationale supérieure des beaux-arts.

In the early 1970s, he became fascinated by Aztec art and culture, spending a year painting and travelling around Mexico. The experience led him to take up sculpture. He returned to Paris in 1974 and two years later he had another solo exhibition at the La Hune gallery, when he exhibited his first sculptural work. The success of the show persuaded him to develop as a sculptor.

Having previously worked with terracotta and bronze, a trip to Carrara, Italy in 1979, inspired him to use marble as his primary medium and in 1983, he set up a studio in Pietrasanta near Carrara in Italy. In 2006, he was commissioned to create new bronze doors and a statue of John the Baptist for the basilica of Santa Maria degli Angeli in Rome.

In 2003, he returned to Poland. In 2005, he received the Golden Medal of Medal for Merit to Culture - Gloria Artis In 2012, he was awarded the Commander's Cross of the Order of Polonia Restituta. Mitoraj died in a Paris hospital and was buried in Pietrasanta where he had kept a studio for many years.

In 2016, Mitoraj's works were exhibited in Pompei, Italy. The Italian culture minister Dario Franceschini announced that the artist's sculpture entitled "Daedalus" would remain in Pompeii permanently as a gift to Italy.

== Style ==
Mitoraj's sculptural style is based on the classical tradition with its focus on the well modelled torso. However, Mitoraj introduced a post-modern twist with ostentatiously truncated limbs, emphasising the damage sustained by many authentic classical sculptures. Often his works aim to address the attributes of the human body, its beauty and fragility, its suffering as well as deeper aspects of human nature, which with the passing of time undergo degeneration. Some art critics have questioned his work as commercial art.

== Gallery ==
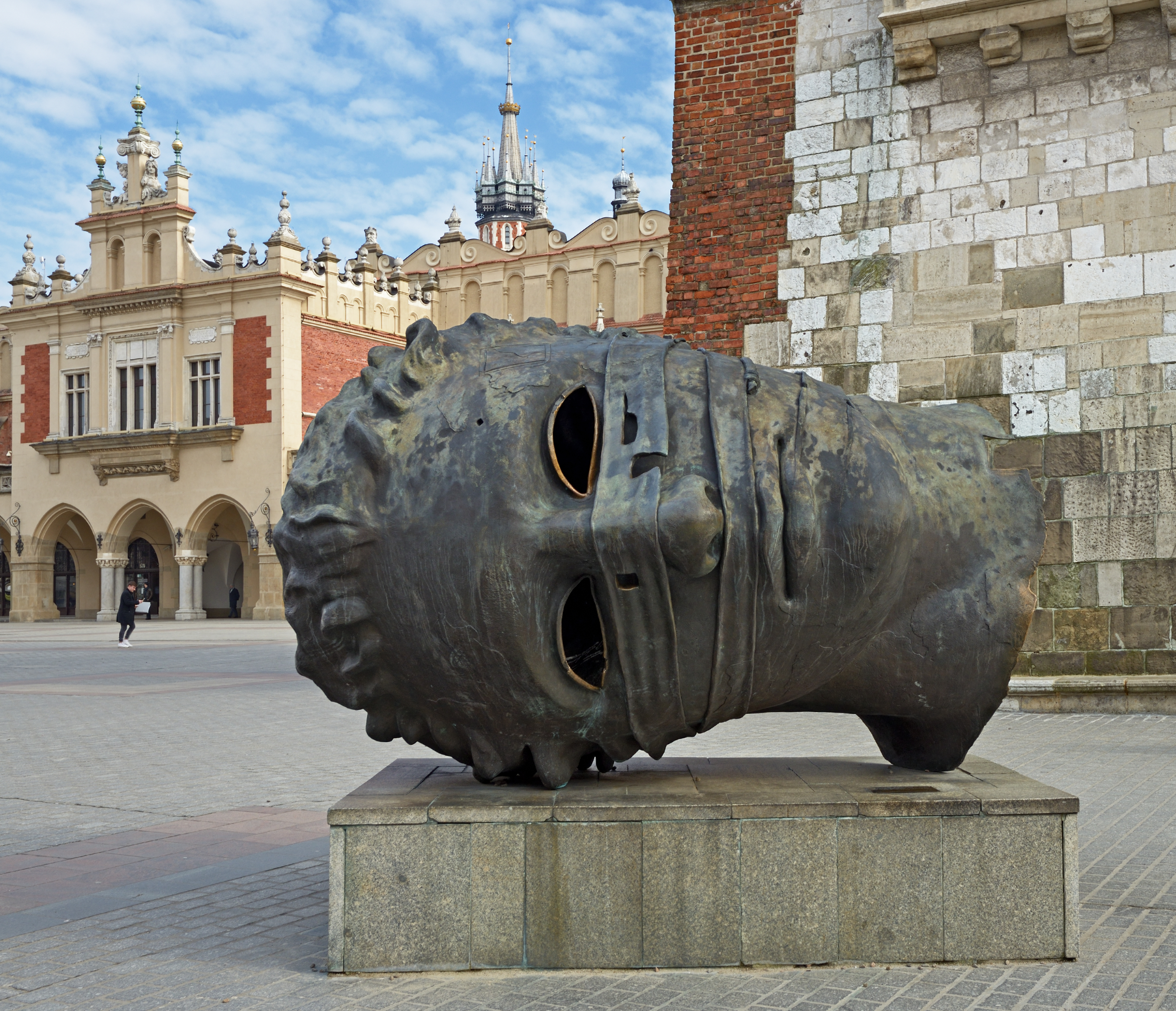
Eros Bendato (Eros Bound) (bronze), 1999, exhibition in Kraków, Poland, 2003

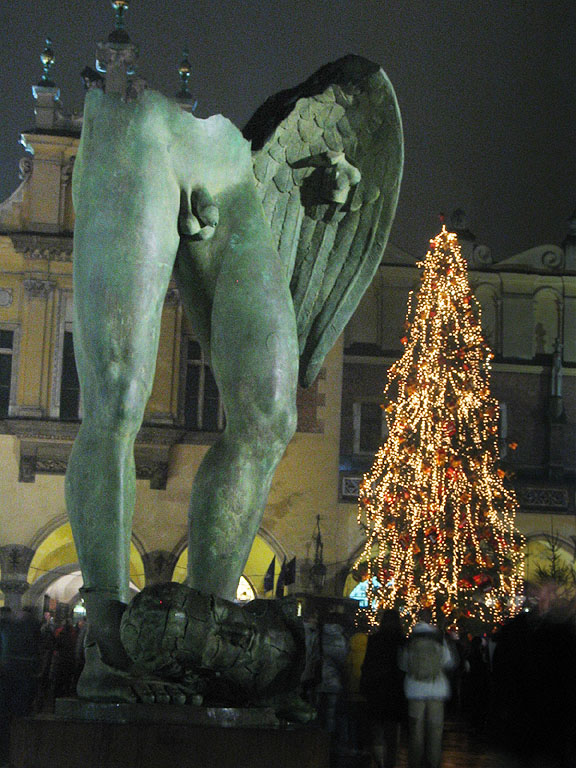
Gambe Alate (bronze), 2002.

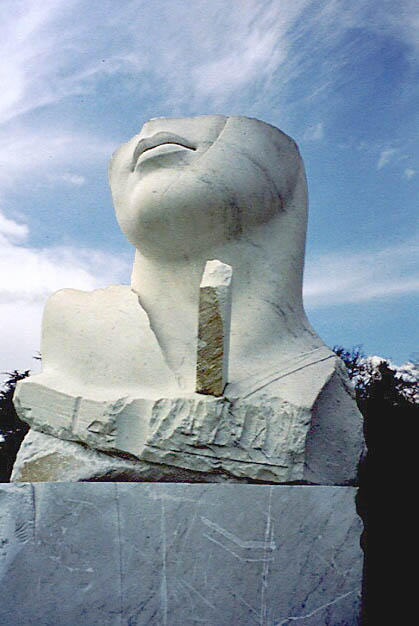
Héros de Lumière, Carrara marble (1986) at the Yorkshire Sculpture Park

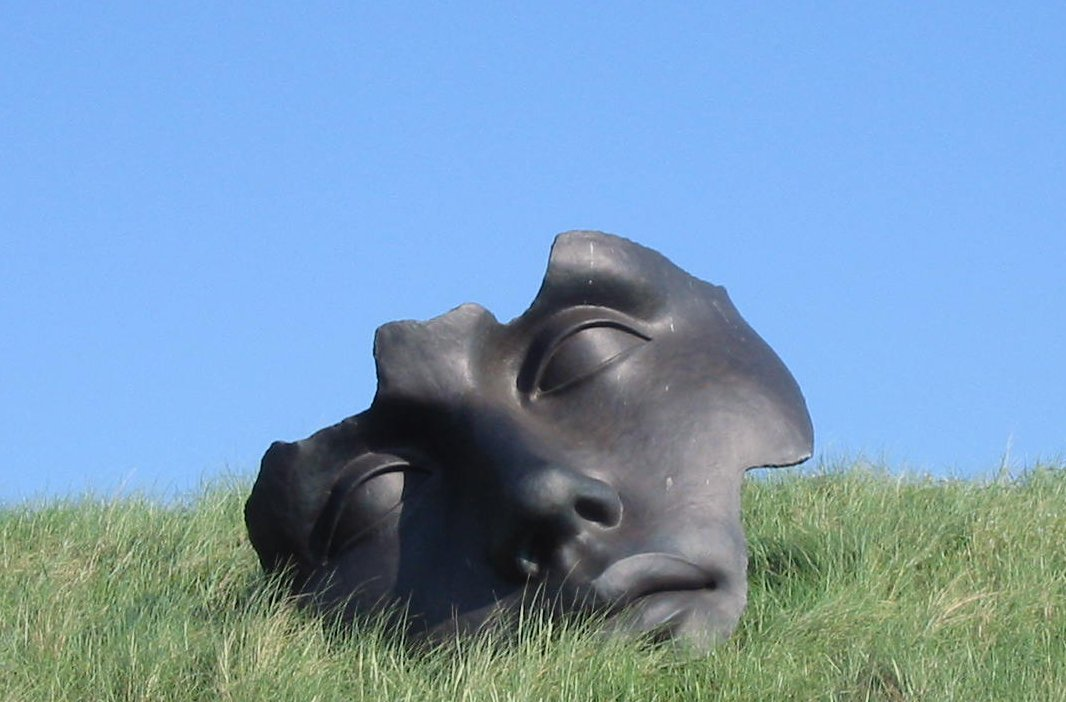
Luci di Nara on the Beeld boulevard, Scheveningen, the Netherlands.

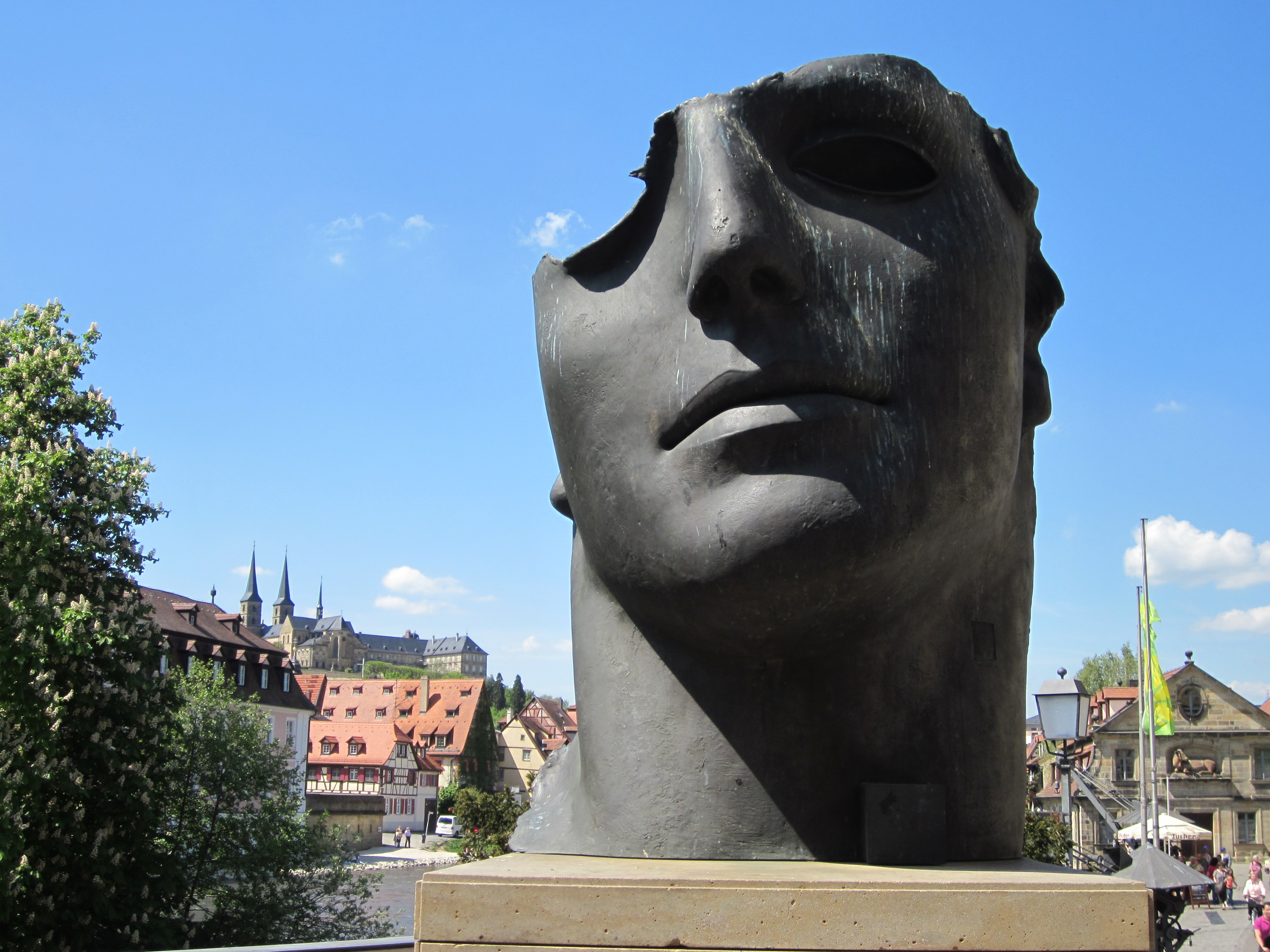
Centurione I, 1987, Bamberg, Germany.

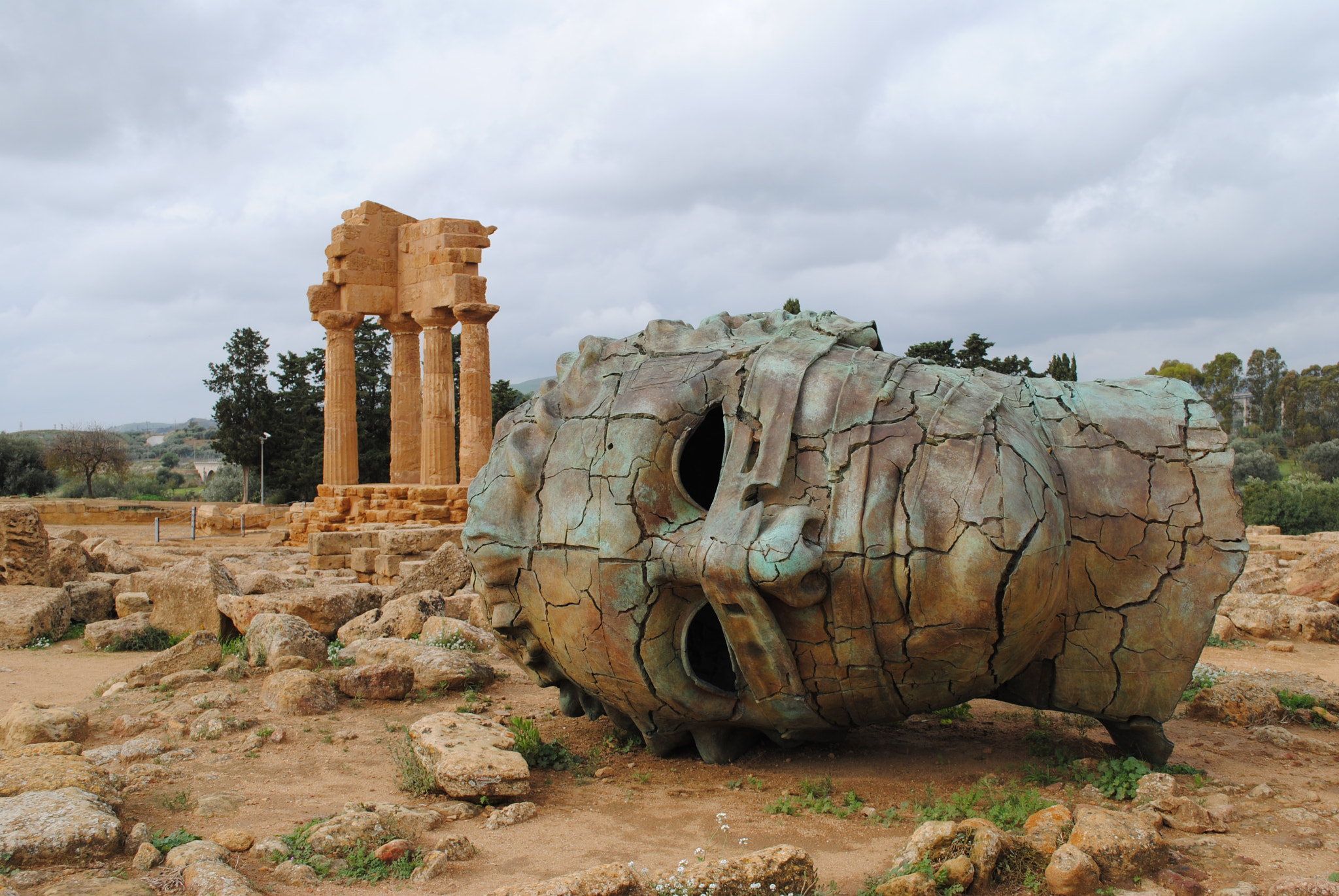
Valle Dei Templi, Agrigento

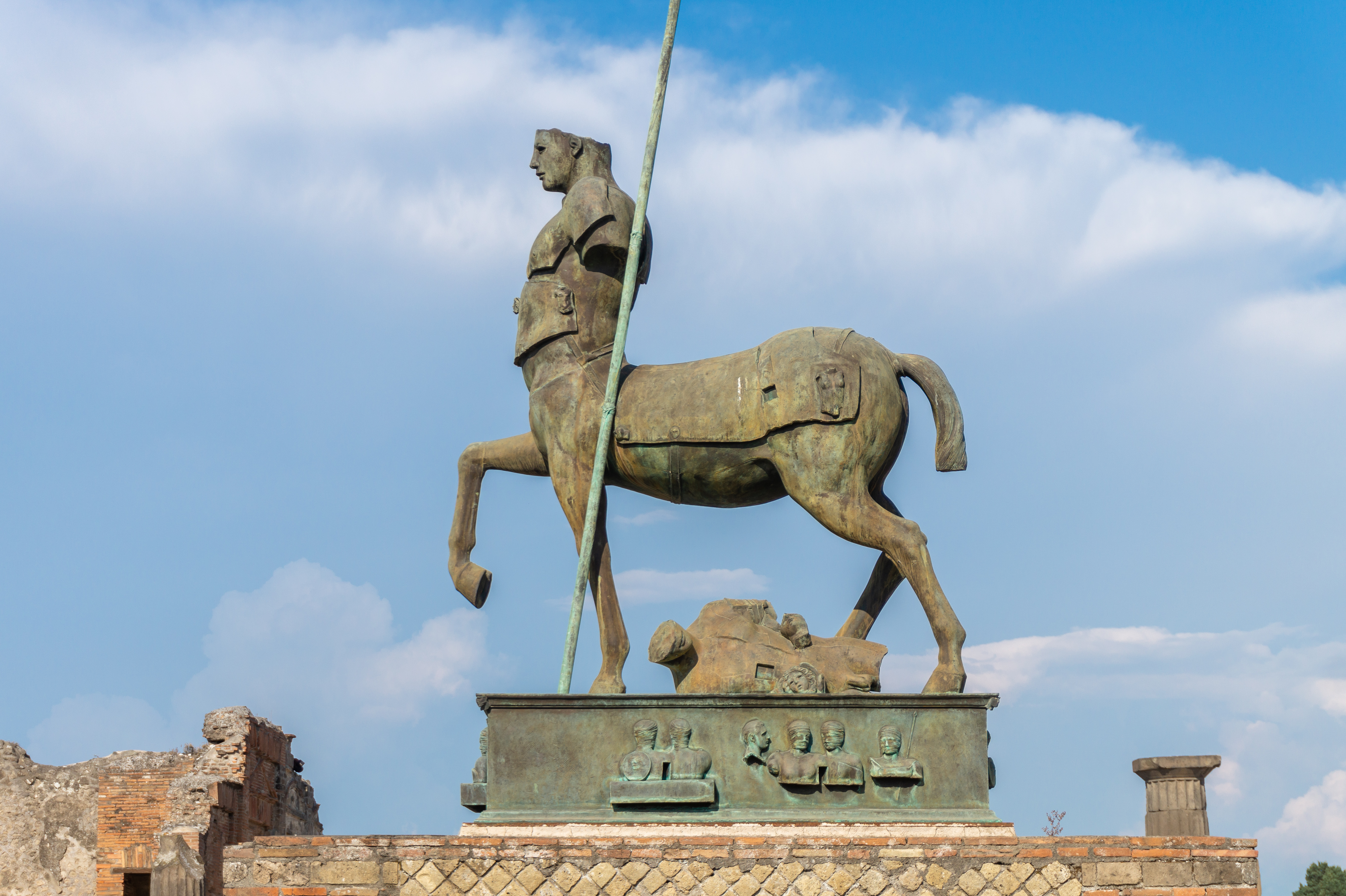
Centauro, Forum of Pompeii, Pompeii, Italy.

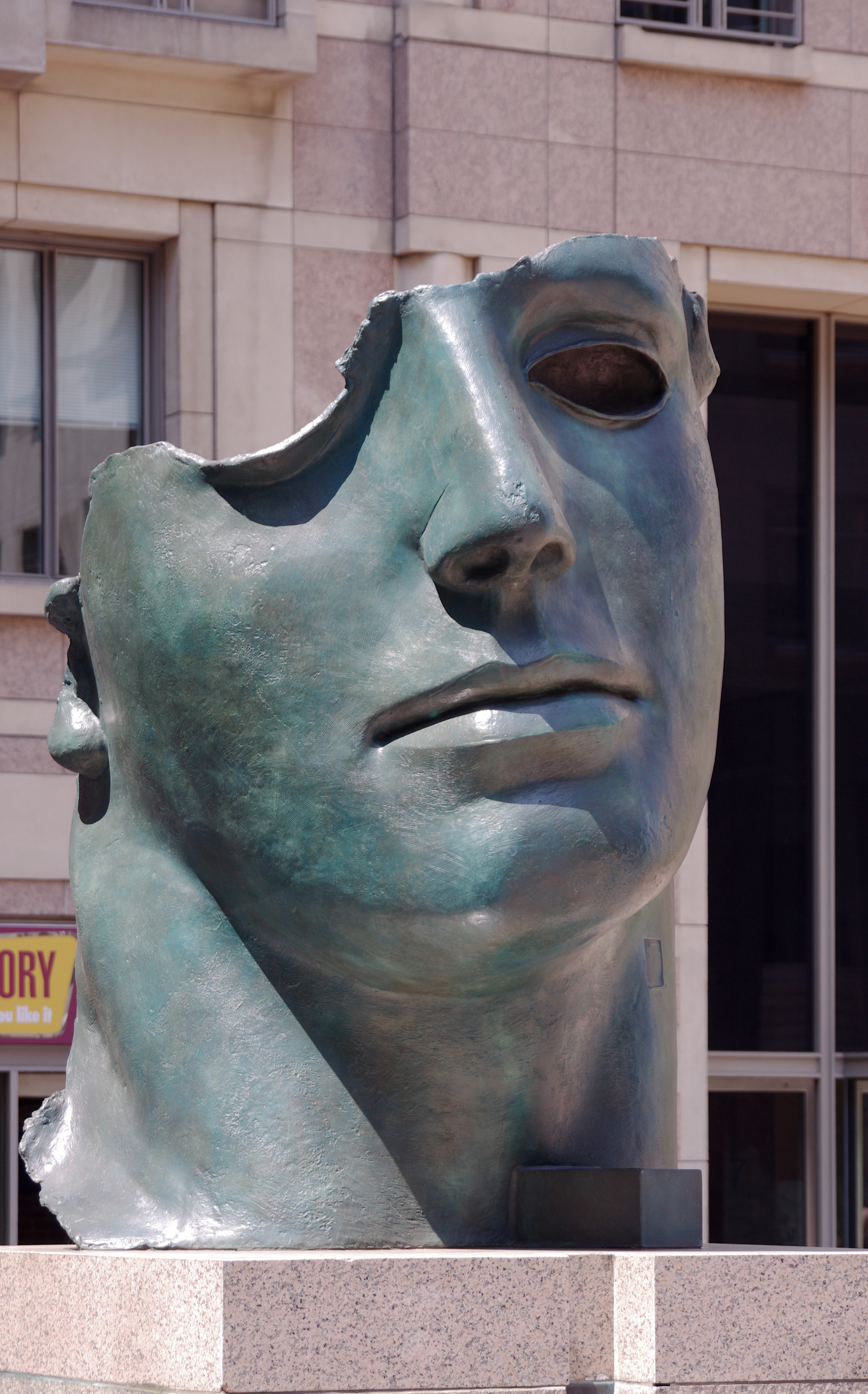
Centurione I. 1987. Bronze. Columbus Courtyard, Canary Wharf, London.

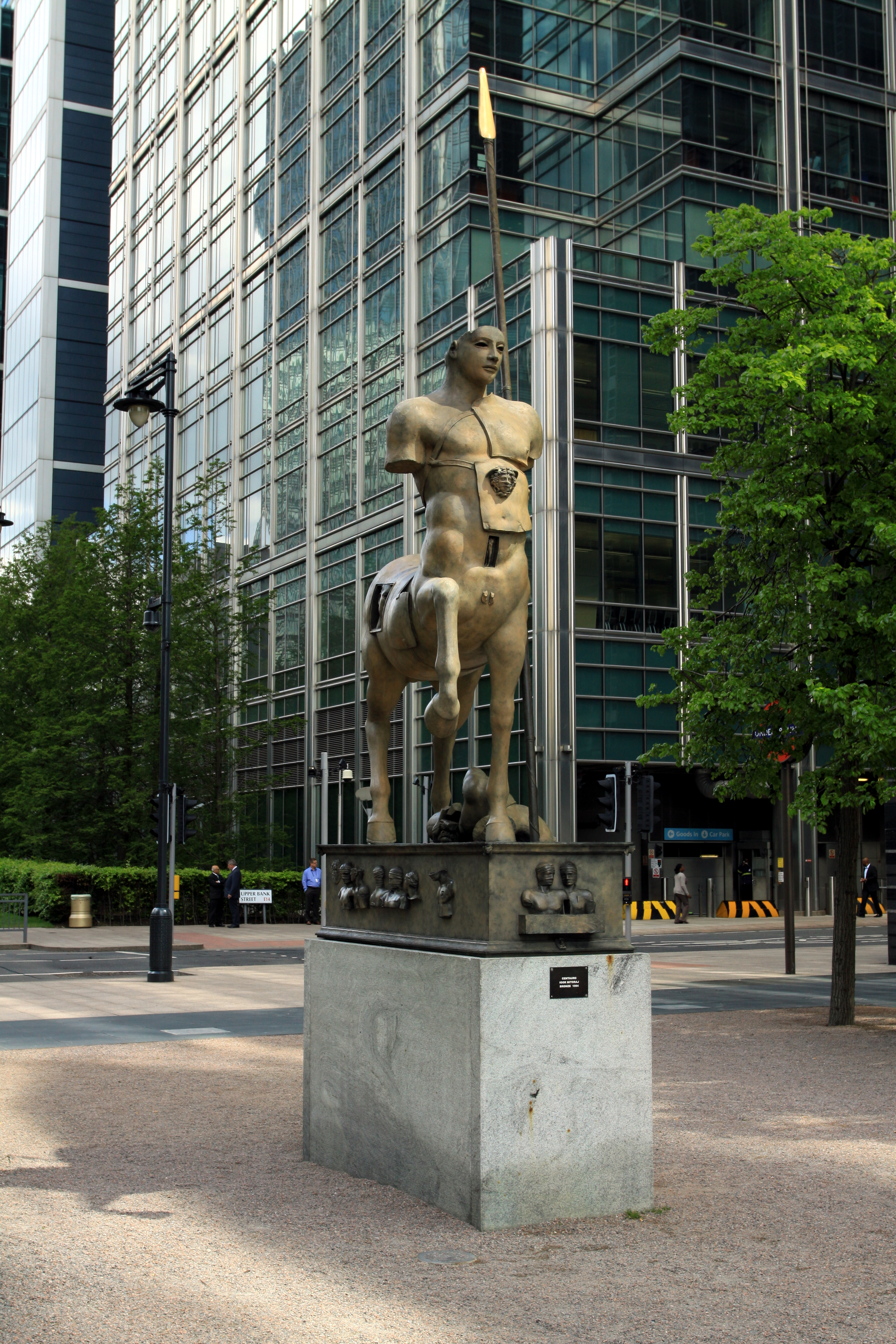
Centauro. 1984. Bronze. Montgomery Square, Canary Wharf, London.

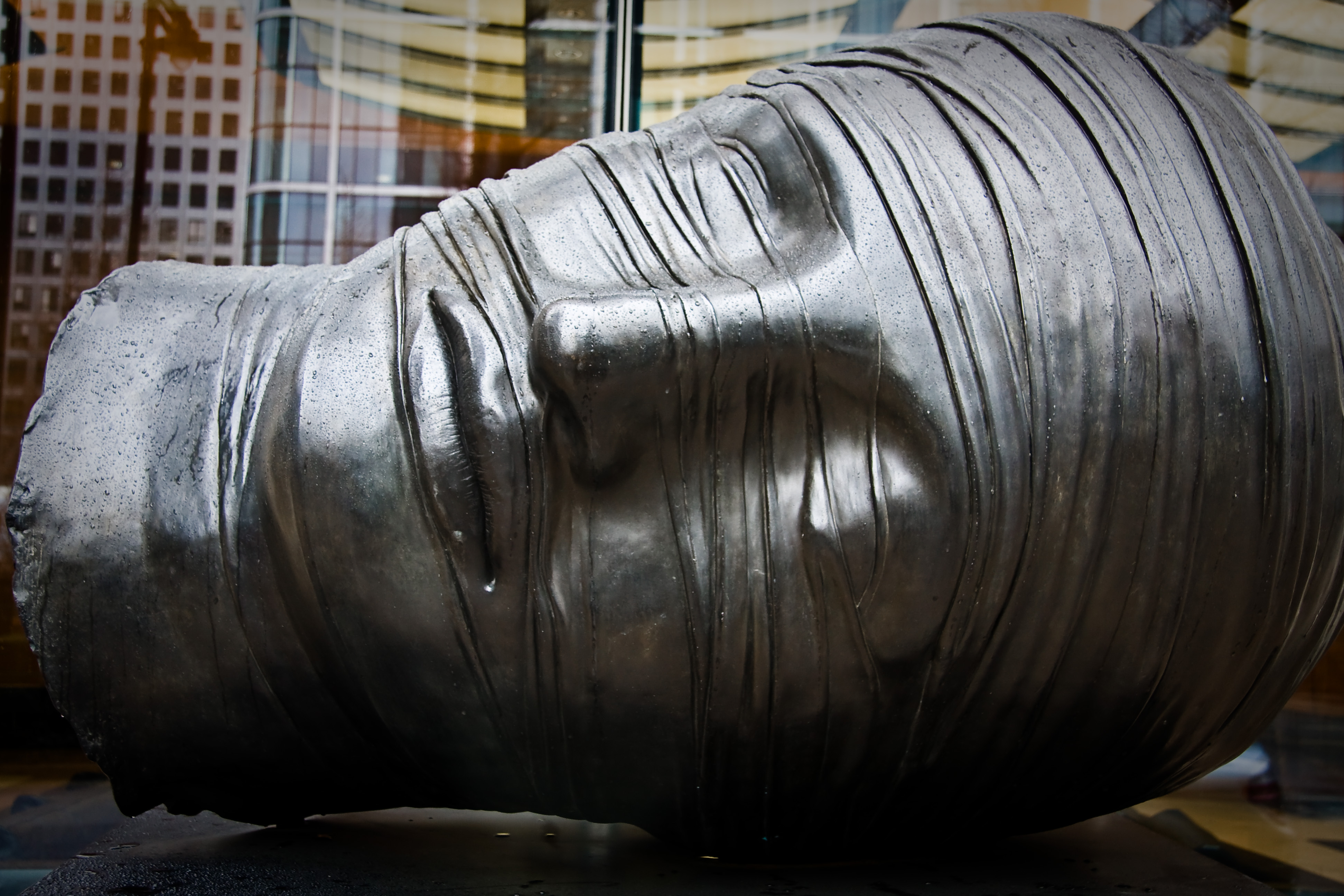
Testa Addormentata, bronze, 1983, located at Bank Street, outside West Wintergarden, Canary Wharf, London, Great Britain.
