= Duchy of Oświęcim =

Silesian duchy (1315–1564)

Coordinates: 50°02′02″N 19°14′17″E

Duchy of Oświęcim Księstwo Oświęcimskie (Polish) Firštyntům Aušwic (Silesian)
- 1315–1564
- Coat of arms of the Austrian Dukes of Auschwitz, 1890

- Silesian duchies in 1309–11, Oświęcim before its separation from the Duchy of Cieszyn (yellow)
- Status: Silesian duchy
- Capital: Oświęcim
- Historical era: Middle Ages
  - Partitioned from Cieszyn: 1315
  - Vassalized by Bohemia: 1327
  - Split off Zator: 1445
  - Sold to Poland: 1457
  - Incorporated into Kraków Voivodeship: 1564
  - Seized by Austria: 1772
Preceded by	Succeeded by
Duchy of Teschen	Crown of the Kingdom of Poland
- Today part of: Poland

The Duchy of Oświęcim (Silesian: Firštyntům Aušwic, Polish: Księstwo Oświęcimskie), or the Duchy of Auschwitz (German: Herzogtum Auschwitz), was one of the Duchies of Silesia in the lands of Lesser Poland (Małopolska), formed in the aftermath of the fragmentation of Poland, centered around Oświęcim.

It was established about 1315 on the Lesser Polish lands east of the Biała river held by the Silesian branch of the Polish royal Piast dynasty. Briefly semi-autonomous, with its capital in Oświęcim, it was finally sold to the Kingdom of Poland in 1457. Thanks to the annexation to the Crown of the Kingdom of Poland, the areas of the Duchy of Oświęcim were reunited with the Kraków Land of Lesser Poland. Annexed by the Habsburg Empire in 1772 as a part of Galicia, the remaining ducal title ceased to exist in 1918 with the lands being reincorporated into the Second Polish Republic as a part of Kraków Voivodeship.

== History ==
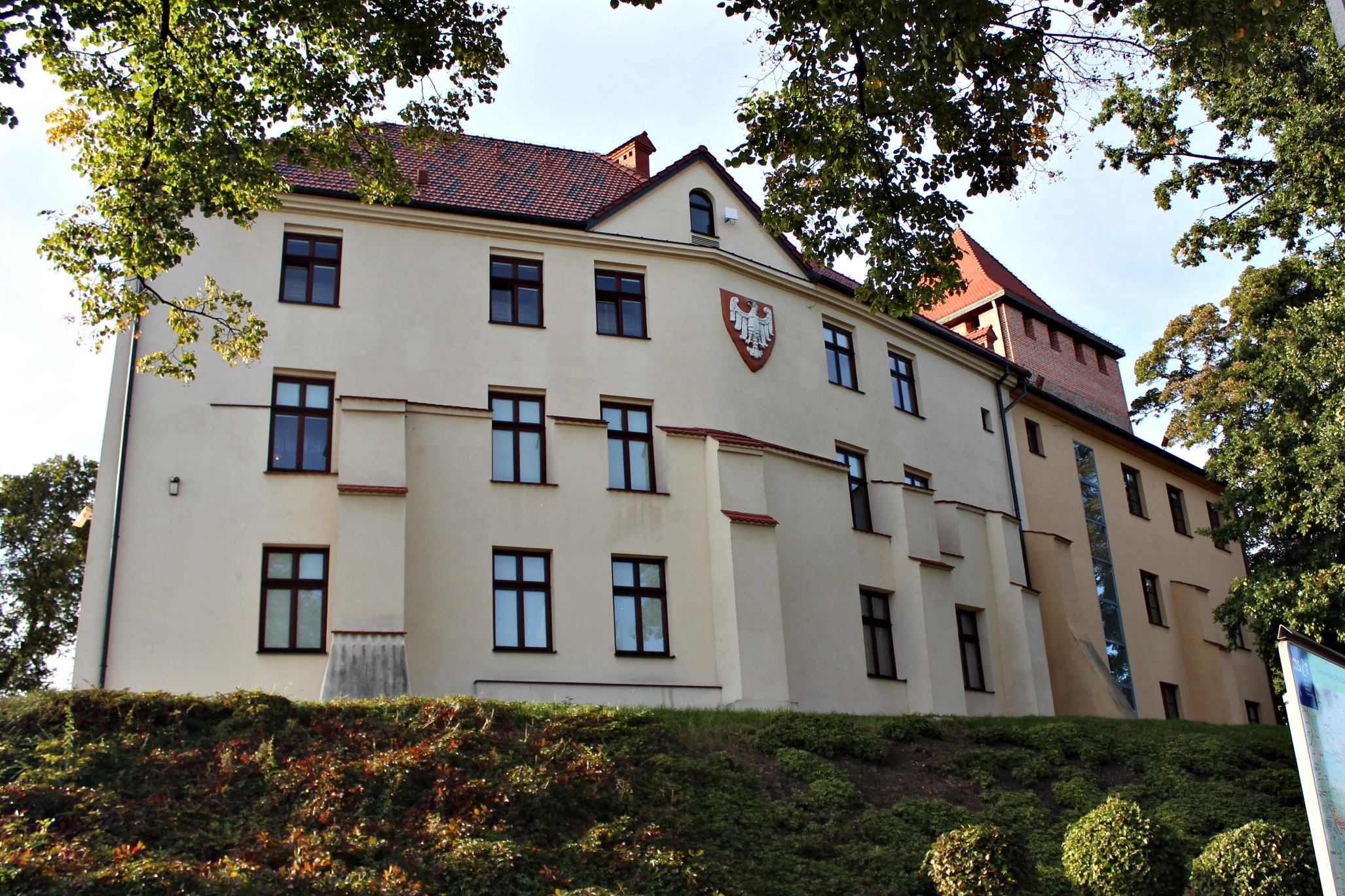
Oświęcim Castle

From the beginning, these areas were part of the Kraków Land of Lesser Poland (Małopolska). The duchy was created in 1315 in the aftermath of the 12th century fragmentation of Poland on these southeastern estates of the original Duchy of Silesia, which the Polish High Duke Casimir II the Just had split off the Seniorate Province and granted to the Silesian duke Mieszko IV Tanglefoot in 1177. From 1281 onwards, the area had been part of the Silesian Duchy of Cieszyn until after the death of Duke Mieszko I in 1315, the lands of Oświęcim east of the Biała were split off from it as a separate duchy for Mieszko's son Władysław. In 1327 his heir Duke Jan I the Scholastic paid homage to King John of Bohemia and likewise many other Silesian duchies, Oświęcim became a vassal of the Bohemian Crown.

In 1445 the duchies of Zator and Toszek were created from some the lands of the duchy. Though the Duchy of Oświęcim had fallen under the Bohemian vassalage, it was re-united with Poland in 1454, when the last duke, Jan IV, declared himself a vassal of the Polish king Casimir IV Jagiellon. Jan had no male heirs and sold his duchy to King Casimir for the price of 3,000,000 Prague groschen three years later.

At the time the duchy was being sold it consisted of: two towns (Oświęcim and Kęty), two ducal castles (in Oświęcim and Wołek) and 45 villages: Bielany, Łęki, Babice, Lipnik, Osiek, Brzeszcze, Monowice, Dwory, Stara Polanka, Nowa Polanka, Włosienica, Poręba, Grojec, Sparowicze (considered lost), Nidek, Witkowice, Głębowice, Bulowice, Czaniec, Malec, Kańczuga, Nowa Wieś, Roczyny, Broszkowice, Brzezinka, Rajsko, Franciszowice (Pławy), Przecieszyn, Skidziń, Wilczkowice, Wilamowice, Hecznarowice, Bujaków, Kozy, Mikuszowice, Pisarzowice, Hałcnów, Biertułtowice, Komorowice, Żebracz, Bestwina, Dankowice, Stara Wieś, Jawiszowice, Harmęże.

At the General sejm of 1564, King Sigismund II Augustus issued privileges of incorporation recognizing both Duchies of Oświęcim and Zator as part of the Polish Crown into the Silesian County of the Kraków Voivodeship (as a part of Lesser Poland Province), although the Polish kings retained both ducal titles.

After the First Partition of Poland in 1772, the lands of the former duchies of Oświęcim and Zator were affiliated to the Habsburg Kingdom of Galicia and Lodomeria, an Austrian crown land from 1804, and joined the German Confederation in 1818 by virtue of its historical affiliation. By the 1919 Treaty of Saint-Germain-en-Laye they were attached to the Polish Kraków Voivodeship.

== Dukes of Oświęcim ==
The Dukes of Oświęcim belonged to the Silesian branch of the Piast dynasty (see also Dukes of Silesia). It should be added that although this area temporarily belonged to the Silesian Piast dynasty, it is the area of Lesser Poland, not Silesia.

1314/5-1321/4	Władysław I (son of Mieszko I of Cieszyn, from 1290 co-regent, due to division of Oświęcim)
1321/4-1372	Jan I the Scholastic (son of Władysław I)
1321/4-1325	Euphrosyne of Masovia (wife of Władysław I, mother of Jan I, regent, d. 1329)
1372-1375/6	Jan II (son Jan I)
1375/6-1405	Jan III (son of Jan II, died childless)
1405–1406	Przemysław (also known as Przemysław the Younger (Młodszy), son of Przemysław I Noszak (whose uncle was Mieszko I, Duke of Cieszyn), from 1404 prince of half of Ścinawa and Głogów, from 1405 also in Toszek)
1410-1433/4	Casimir I (son of Przemysł Młodszy, due to division in 1414 of Oświęcim, Toszek and Strzelin (in Strzelin until 1427))
1433/4-1484	Przemysław of Toszek (son of Casimir I, also prince of Toszek due to its division in 1445)
1433/4-1456	Jan IV (Janusz) (brother of Przemysław Toszecki and son of Kazimierz I, also prince of Toszek, from 1445 due to a division of Oświęcim, 1465-1482 Gliwice, abdicated (Oświęcim transferred to Crown of Poland), d. 1496)

=== Rulers claiming the ducal title after partition of Poland ===
In the aftermath of the First Partition of Poland until 1918, the Habsburg Holy Roman Emperors, from 1804 Emperors of Austria held the title of a Duke of Auschwitz (German: Herzog zu Auschwitz) which constituted part of their official grand title.

Emperor	Acceded	Deceded
Joseph II	1772	20 February 1790
Leopold II	20 February 1790	1 March 1792
Francis I	1 March 1792	2 March 1835
Ferdinand I	2 March 1835	2 December 1848
Francis Joseph I	2 December 1848	21 November 1916
Charles I	21 November 1916	11 November 1918
