= Repatriation of Poles =

Repatriation of Poles can refer to:

- Repatriation of Poles (1944–1946)
- Repatriation of Poles (1955–1959)

== See also ==
- Expulsion of Poles (disambiguation)
