= Expulsion of Poles =

Expulsion of Poles can refer to:

- Expulsion of Poles by Germany in the 19th and 20th centuries
- Expulsion of Poles by Nazi Germany (1939–1944)
- Soviet repressions of Polish citizens (1939–1946)

== See also ==
Polish population movements from the USSR:

- Polish population transfers (1944–1946)
- Repatriation of Poles (1955–59)
