= Expulsion of Poles by Nazi Germany =

World War II expulsions

- Part of Nazi war crimes in occupied Poland during World War II, the expulsion of Poles by Germany, Generalplan Ost
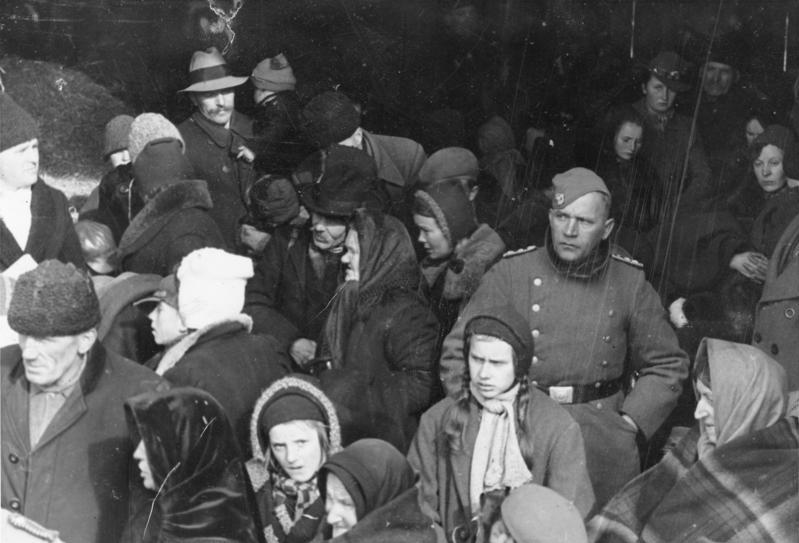
- Poles expelled in 1939 from Reichsgau Wartheland
- Location: German-occupied Poland
- Date: 1939–1944
- Target: Poles
- Attack type: population transfer, ethnic cleansing, massacre, kidnapping of children
- Victim: 1.7 million expelled
- Perpetrator: Nazi Germany
- Motive: Anti-Polish sentiment, Germanisation, German irredentism, Lebensraum, Nazi racial ideology, Anti-Slavic sentiment

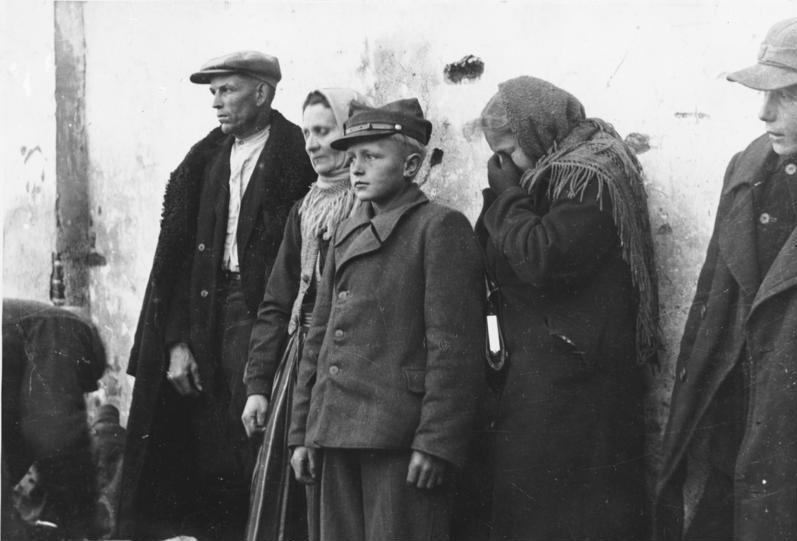
Polish Matczak family among Poles expelled in 1939 from Sieradz in central Poland

During World War II, over 1.7 million Poles were forcibly resettled from the territories of German-occupied Poland, with the aim of their Germanization (see Lebensraum) between 1939 and 1944.

The German Government had plans for the extensive colonisation of territories of occupied Poland, which were annexed directly into Nazi Germany in 1939. Eventually these plans grew bigger to include parts of the General Government. The region was to become a "purely German area" within 15–20 years, as explained by Adolf Hitler in March 1941. By that time the General Government was to be cleared of 15 million Polish nationals, and resettled by 4–5 million ethnic Germans.

The operation was the culmination of the expulsion of Poles by Germany carried out since the 19th century, when Poland was partitioned among foreign powers including Germany.

== Racial policies ==
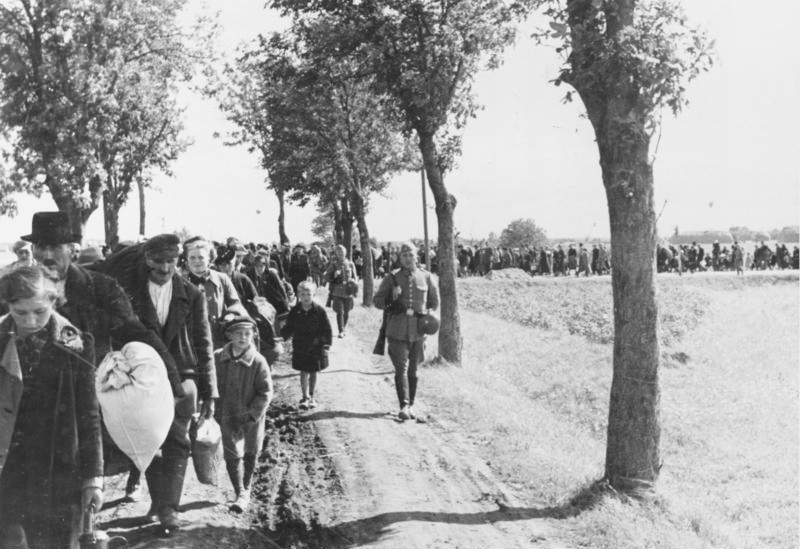
Expulsion from Reichsgau Wartheland. Poles are led to trains under German army escort, as part of the ethnic cleansing of western Poland annexed to the German Reich following the invasion.

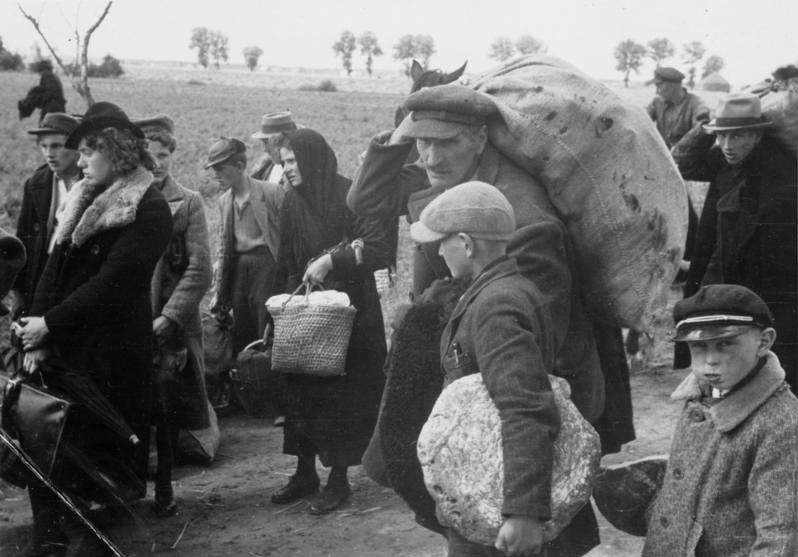
Expulsion of Poles from Czerniejewo in 1939

Following the German invasion of the country, Nazi expansionist policies were enacted upon its Polish population on an unprecedented scale. In accordance with Nazi ideology the Poles were considered Untermenschen, deemed for slavery and their further extermination, in order to make room for the Germans re-settled from across Europe. Furthermore, Hitler intended to extensively colonize all territories lying to the east of the Third Reich. These were worked out by the RSHA department of the SS in Generalplan Ost (GPO, "[the] General Plan for the East"), which foresaw the deportation of 45 million "non-Germanizable" people from Central & Eastern Europe to West Siberia; of whom 31 million were "racially undesirable": including 100% of Jews, Poles (85%), Belarusians (75%) and Ukrainians (65%). Poland itself would have been cleared of all Polish people eventually, as 20 million or so were going to be expelled further east. The remaining 3 to 4 million Polish peasants believed to be the Polonized "descendants" of German colonists and migrants (Walddeutsche, Prussian settlers, etc.) – and therefore considered "racially valuable" – would be Germanized and dispersed among the ethnic German population living on formerly Polish soil. The Nazi leadership hoped that through expulsions to Siberia, famine, mass executions and slave labour, the Polish nation would eventually be completely destroyed. Experiments in mass sterilization in concentration camps may also have been intended for use on the populations.

The World War II expulsions took place within two specific political entities established by the Nazis, divided from each other by a closed border: one area outright annexed to the Reich in 1939–1941, and another called the General Government, a precursor to the further expansion of the German administrative settlement area. Eventually, as Adolf Hitler explained in March 1941, the General Government would be cleared of all Poles and the region turned into a "purely German area" within 15–20 years, and in place of 15 million Poles, 4–5 million Germans would live there. The area was to become "as German as the Rhineland".

There was a special institution set up in November 1939 in German-occupied Poznań to coordinate the expulsion. Initially named the Special Staff for the Resettlement of Poles and Jews (Sonderstab für die Aussiedlung von Polen und Juden), it was soon renamed to Office for the Resettlement of Poles and Jews (Amt für Umsiedlung der Polen und Juden), and eventually renamed to Central Bureau for Resettlement (UWZ, Umwandererzentralstelle) in 1940. The main seats of the UWZ were located in Poznań and Gdynia, with an additional major branch located in Łódź and minor branches located in various other towns, including Kępno, Wieluń, Sieradz and Zamość. The UWZ also supervised the network of resettlement camps for Poles. In the resettlement camps, Poles were subjected to brutal searches and racial selection, families were often broken up and children were taken from their parents. Poor conditions, low food rations, lack of medical care and brutal treatment resulted in high mortality in the resettlement camps for Poles, which was in contrast to the conditions in the camps for German colonists, managed by Volksdeutsche Mittelstelle, the main agency responsible for coordinating German settlement in occupied Poland. Poles were then deported to new destinations in overcrowded freight trains that lacked any sanitary facilities.

By 1945 one million German Volksdeutsche from several Eastern European countries and regions such as the Soviet Union, Bessarabia, Romania and the Baltic States had been successfully resettled into Poland during the action called "Heim ins Reich". The deportation orders specifically required that enough Poles be removed to provide for every settler—that, for instance, if twenty German "master bakers" were sent, twenty Polish bakeries had to have their owners removed. The expulsions of Poles were conducted by two German organisations: the Hauptamt Volksdeutsche Mittelstelle and the Resettlement Department of the "Reich Commissioner for the Consolidation of Germandom" (RKFDV, Reichskomissar für die Festigung deutschen Volkstums), a title held by Heinrich Himmler. The new Germans were put in villages and towns already cleared of their native Polish inhabitants under the banner of Lebensraum.

== Expulsions from Polish territories annexed by Nazi Germany ==
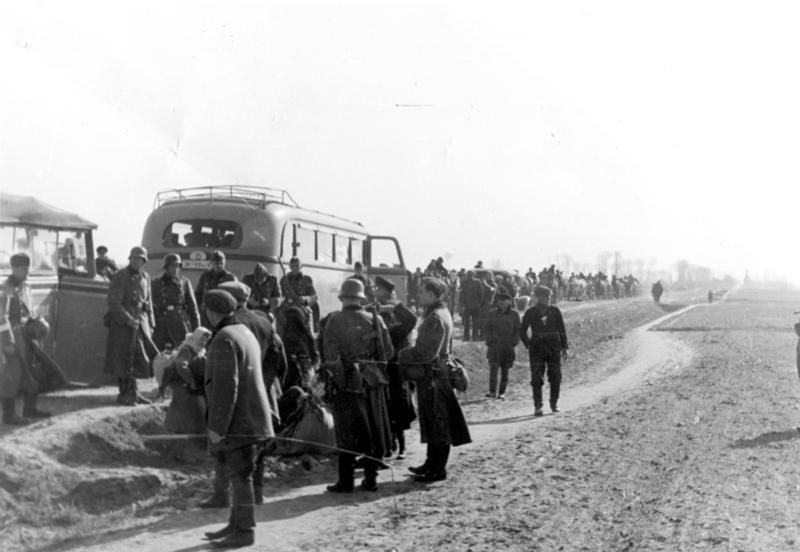
Expulsion of 280,606 Poles from Reichsgau Wartheland

The first lands that were subject to mass expulsions, Germanization and extermination (see Intelligenzaktion) were the regions annexed directly to Germany in 1939, i.e. Greater Poland, Kuyavia, Pomerania, western and northern Mazovia, Silesia and Dąbrowa Basin. The expulsions were accompanied by economic exploitation, looting, and confiscation of Polish enterprises and farms covering millions of hectares. The houses and property were handed over to ethnic Germans, especially future members of the occupation administration, entrepreneurs, craftsmen, former Wehrmacht soldiers and colonists from Central and Eastern Europe, while Poles were mostly deported either to the General Government or to forced labour.

Germanization began with the classification of which people were "racially suitable", as defined by the Nazi Volksliste. About 1.7 million Poles were deemed Germanizable, including between one and two hundred thousand Polish children who were taken away from their parents. For the remainder expulsion was carried out, often in cattle cars in freezing weather, causing the deaths of many, especially children. They were carried out on short notice, often at night, and the people were allowed only a few belongings. Ethnic Germans being resettled there were often given Polish homes with half-eaten meals on tables, and unmade beds, where small children had been sleeping at the time of their evictions. Members of the Hitler Youth and the League of German Girls were assigned the task of overseeing the evictions to ensure that the Poles left behind most of their belongings for the use of the settlers. This could also mean the separation of entire families, with able-bodied adults being sent to work in Germany while the rest were sent to the General Government. The expulsion also affected tens of thousands of Polish Jews and Romani people.

Some villages were destroyed to make place for proving grounds of the German military and the Waffen-SS. Poles expelled from those villages had nothing to return to after the war and had to settle in new locations.

Together with so-called "wild expulsions", in four years of Nazi occupation 923,000 Poles were ethnically cleansed from the territories annexed by Germany into the Reich. According to research conducted by Czesław Łuczak, the Germans expelled the following numbers of Poles from areas annexed into the Reich as well as all others in the period of 1939–1944:

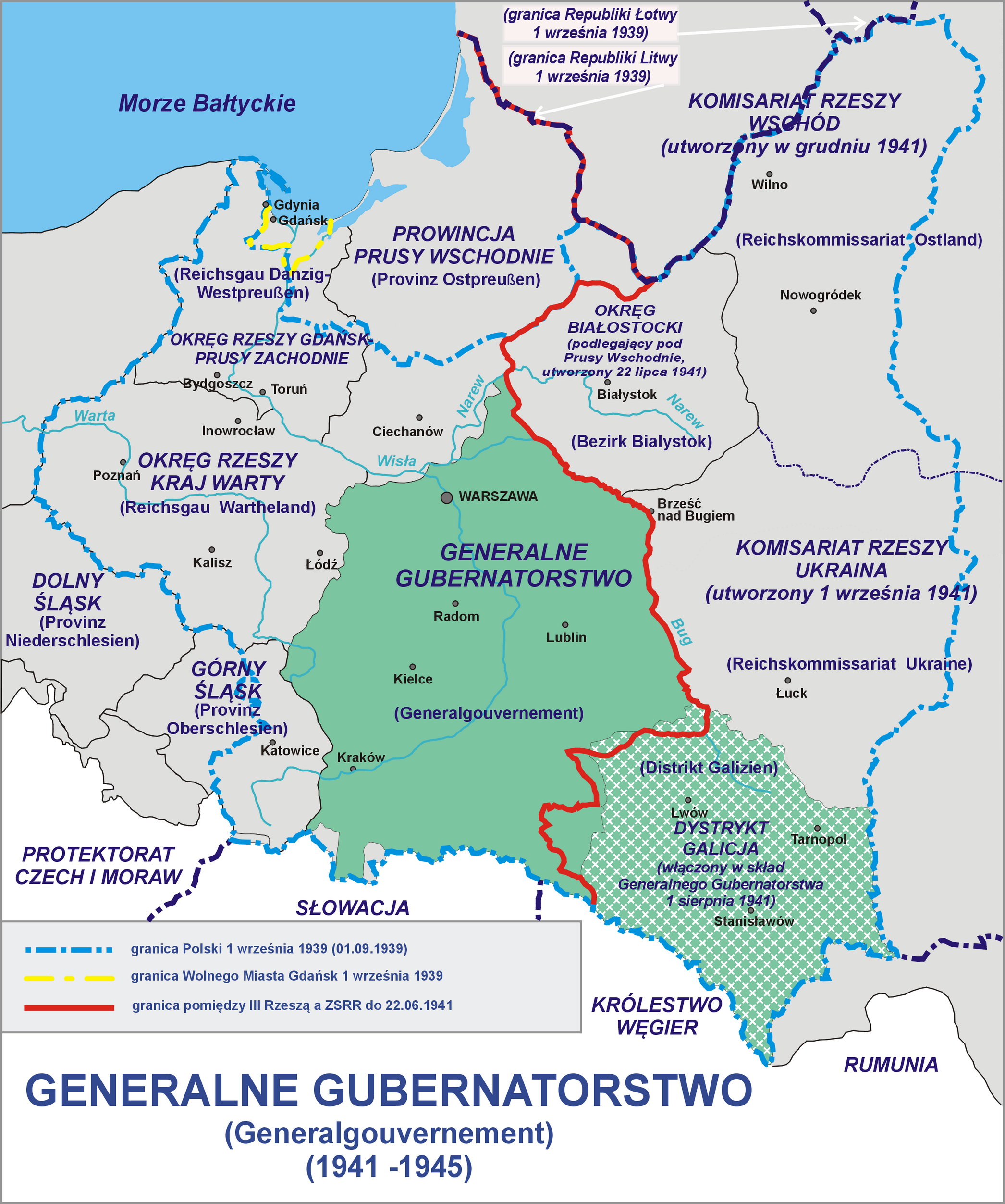
Map of General Government – green; expanded upon Nazi German attack on the Soviet Union – light green. Curzon Line – red. Reichsgau Wartheland – between blue borders of 1939 western Poland, and green General Government.

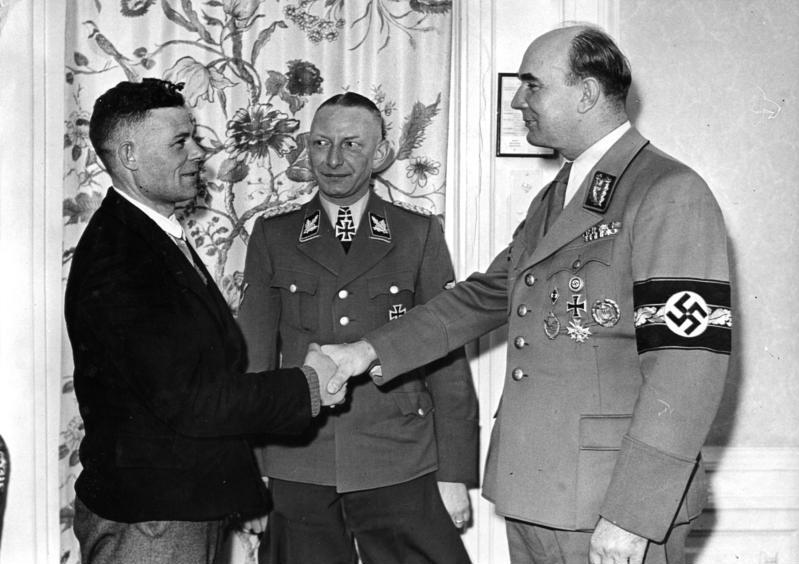
SS Obergruppenfuhrer Arthur Greiser welcomes the one milionth ethnic German resettled from Eastern Europe in the annexed territories of occupied Poland, March 1944.

Expulsion of Poles by Nazi Germany 1939–1944
Name of territory	Number of displaced Poles
Warthegau region (including Greater Poland and Łódź)	280,606
Silesia	81,000
Pomerelia	124,000
Białystok	28,000
Ciechanów (Northern Mazovia)	25,000
"Wild expulsions" of 1939 (Pomerelia mostly)	30,000 – 40,000
Polish areas annexed by Nazi Germany (total)	918,000 – 928,000
Zamość region	100,000 – 110,000
General Government (proving grounds)	171,000
Warsaw (after the Warsaw Uprising)	500,000
Grand total on all occupied Polish territories	1,689,000 – 1,709,000

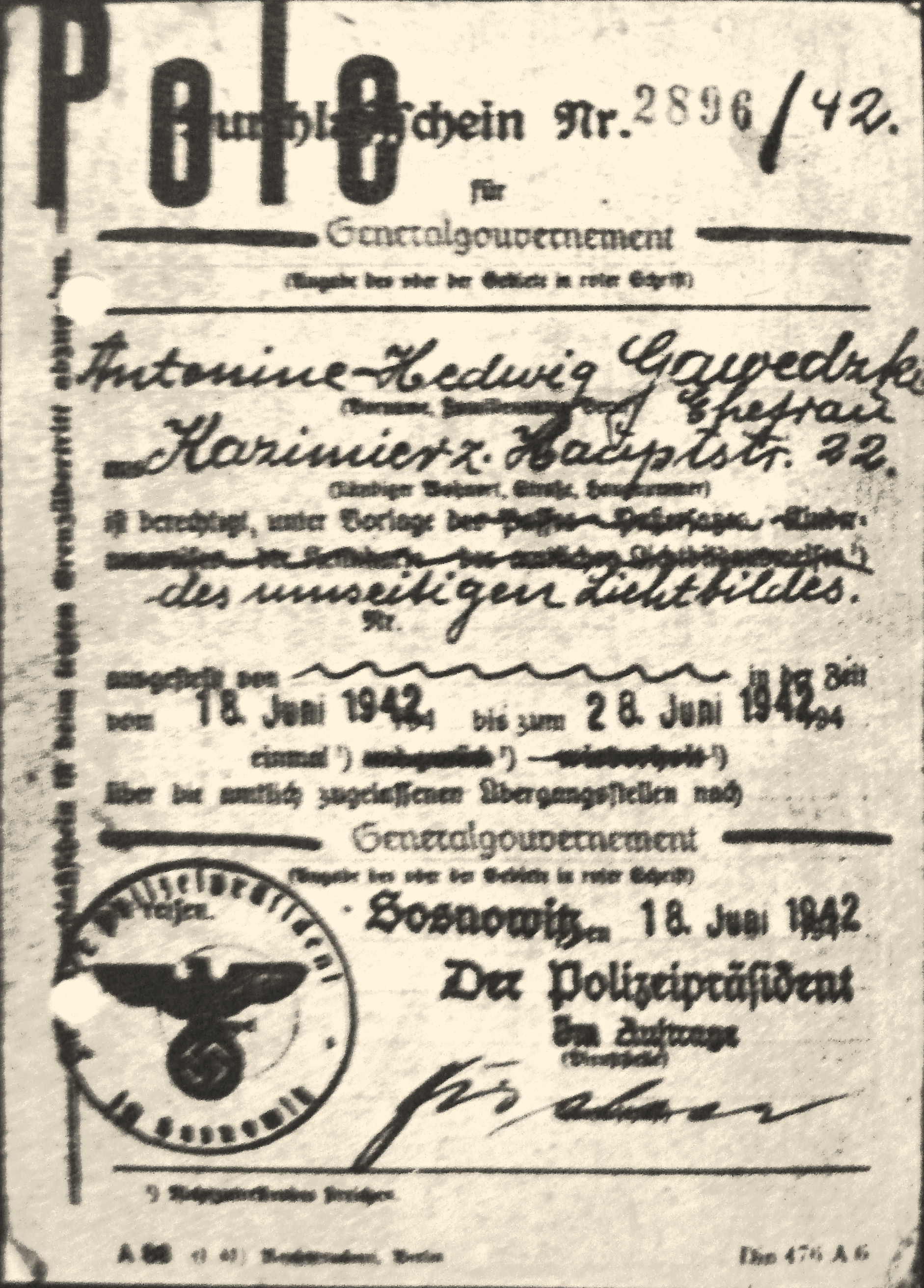
Expulsion Warrant from Sosnowiec 1942 with stamp Pole

=== Greater Poland ===
Between 1939 and 1940, Nazi expulsions from German-occupied Greater Poland (Wielkopolska) affected 680,000 Poles. From the city of Poznań in Reichsgau Wartheland alone, the Germans expelled 70,000 Poles to the General Government. The deportations conducted under the leadership of SS-Obergruppenführer Wilhelm Koppe, were supervised by SS-Standartenführer Ernst Damzog, who was also in charge of the daily operation of the Chełmno extermination camp. By 1945, half a million German Volksdeutsche from Eastern Europe, including the Soviet Union, Volhynia, Bessarabia, Romania as well as the Baltic Germans, had been resettled into this area during the action called "Heim ins Reich".

=== Pomerelia ===
From 1939 to 1940 in German-occupied Pomerelia (named Danzig-West Prussia by the Germans), the expulsions affected 121,765 Poles. A total of 130,000 Volksdeutsche were resettled there including 57,000 Germans from Eastern Europe, including Soviet Union, Bessarabia, Romania and the Baltic states.

=== Silesia ===
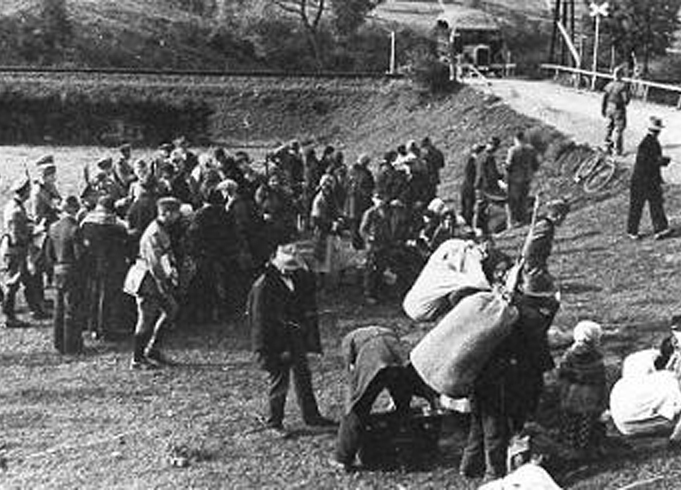
Action Saybusch, 24 September 1940. Expelled Poles await transport at a railway crossing (in this photo, some members of the 129 families deported from the village of Dolna Sól).

In Silesia, the Germans operated a network of forced labour camps for expelled Poles from the region, which were known as Polenlager.

In 1940 and 1941 the Germans evicted 17,000 Polish and Jewish residents from the western districts of the city of Oświęcim; from all places located directly adjacent to the Auschwitz concentration camp and also from the villages of Broszkowice, Babice, Brzezinka, Rajsko, Pławy, Harmęże, Bór, and Budy. The expulsion of Polish civilians was a step towards establishing the "Camp Interest Zone" meant to isolate the camp from the outside world, and to expand economic activity designed to meet the needs of the SS. Ethnic German and Volksdeutsche settlers were being shipped in instead.

The years 1940 to 1944 marked the expulsion of 50,000 Poles from the Żywiec area including 18,000–20,000 Poles during the Action Saybusch operation conducted by the Wehrmacht and Ordnungspolizei in late 1940. The first of these actions took place on 22 September 1940. Aktion Saybusch lasted from September to December 1940, with some 3,200 Volksdeutsche brought in Heim ins Reich (Home into the Empire) from Romanian Bukovina. Until the end of the Second World War a third of the Polish population was expelled from this region out of a total of 50,000 inhabitants. Poles were forcibly removed from the region and replaced with about 4,000 Volksdeutsche settlers from Eastern Galicia and Volhynia who were given new latifundia.

=== Łódź area ===
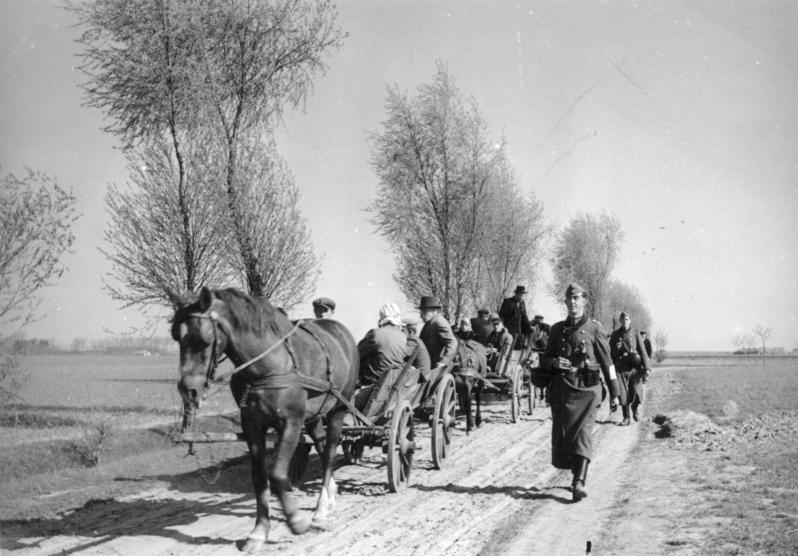
Expulsion of Poles from Kościerzyn in 1939

The Łódź area was attached by the Germans to occupied Greater Poland (Wielkopolska), renamed Reichsgau Wartheland. The first expulsions from the city of Łódź (renamed Litzmannstadt) took place in 1939. The Nazis, helped by the local Volksdeutsche, expelled Polish families from the osiedle "Montwiłła" Mireckiego first. Until 1940, all 5,000 residents of this subdivision were expelled. Between 1939 and 1945, from the entire Łódź area ("Regierungsbezirk Litzmannstadt") including Łódź itself, Sieradz, Pabianice and other settlements, 444,000 persons of Polish ethnicity were expelled – almost 25% of its population.

== Expulsions from the General Government ==
The territory of the German district called the General Government was the second main area of expulsions after the German-annexed more western provinces of Poland. The entity itself was seen only as a temporary measure by the Germans, and served as a large concentration area for Poles to perform hard labour to further Germany's industry and war effort. Eventually it was to be cleared of Poles as well.

=== Zamość ===
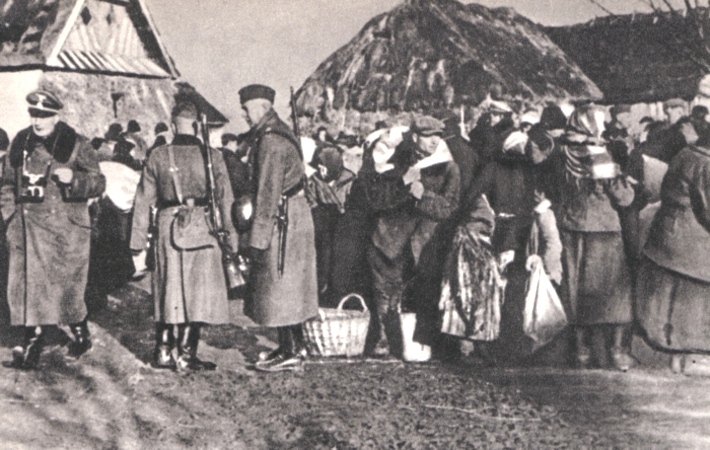
Expulsion of Poles from villages in the Zamość Region by the SS in December 1942

116,000 Poles were expelled from the region of Zamość, as part of the Nazi plan to establish German colonies further east in the conquered territories. Zamość itself was to be renamed Himmlerstadt ("Himmler City"), later changed to Pflugstadt (Plough City), that was to symbolise the German "Plough" that was to "plough" the East. Additionally, almost 30,000 children were kidnapped by the German authorities from their parents in that area for their further Germanization. The action led to a massive operation by the Polish underground resistance movement led primarily by the Armia Krajowa and Bataliony Chłopskie, known as the Zamość Uprising.

=== Warsaw ===
Among the expulsions from the metropolitan centres of Poland, the largest took place in its capital. In October 1940, 115,000 Poles were expelled from their homes in central Warsaw to make room for the Jewish Ghetto constructed by the authorities. After the failure of the Warsaw Uprising, half a million people were expelled from the city as punishment, with 35% of the buildings systematically leveled block by block.

== See also ==
- Nazi crimes against the Polish nation
- Flight and expulsion of Germans (1944–1950)
- Expulsion of Poles by Germany in the 19th and 20th centuries
- Repatriation and expulsion of Poles (in two major waves) after World War II
- Kidnapping of children by Nazi Germany
