= Gmina Polanka Wielka =

Gmina Polanka Wielka Polanka Wielka Commune
- Gmina
- Coat of arms
- Interactive map of Gmina Polanka Wielka
- Coordinates (Polanka Wielka): 49°59′N 19°19′E
- Country: Poland
- Voivodeship: Lesser Poland
- County: Oświęcim
- Seat: Polanka Wielka

Area
  - Total: 24.08 km^{2} (9.30 sq mi)

Population (2006)
  - Total: 4,136
  - Density: 171.8/km^{2} (444.9/sq mi)
- Website: www.polanka-wielka.iap.pl

Gmina Polanka Wielka is a rural gmina (administrative district) in Oświęcim County, Lesser Poland Voivodeship, in southern Poland. Its seat is the village of Polanka Wielka, which lies approximately 10 kilometres (6 mi) south-east of Oświęcim and 46 km (29 mi) west of the regional capital Kraków.

The gmina covers an area of 24.08 square kilometres (9.3 sq mi), and as of 2006, its total population is 4,136.

== Neighbouring gminas ==
Gmina Polanka Wielka is bordered by the gminas of Osiek, Oświęcim, Przeciszów and Wieprz.
