= Gmina Oświęcim =

Gmina Oświęcim Oświęcim Commune
- Gmina
- Coat of arms
- Interactive map of Gmina Oświęcim
- Coordinates (Oświęcim): 50°3′N 19°14′E
- Country: Poland
- Voivodeship: Lesser Poland
- County: Oświęcim
- Seat: Oświęcim

Area
  - Total: 74.47 km^{2} (28.75 sq mi)

Population (2006)
  - Total: 16,708
  - Density: 224.4/km^{2} (581.1/sq mi)
- Website: www.oswiecim-gmina.pl

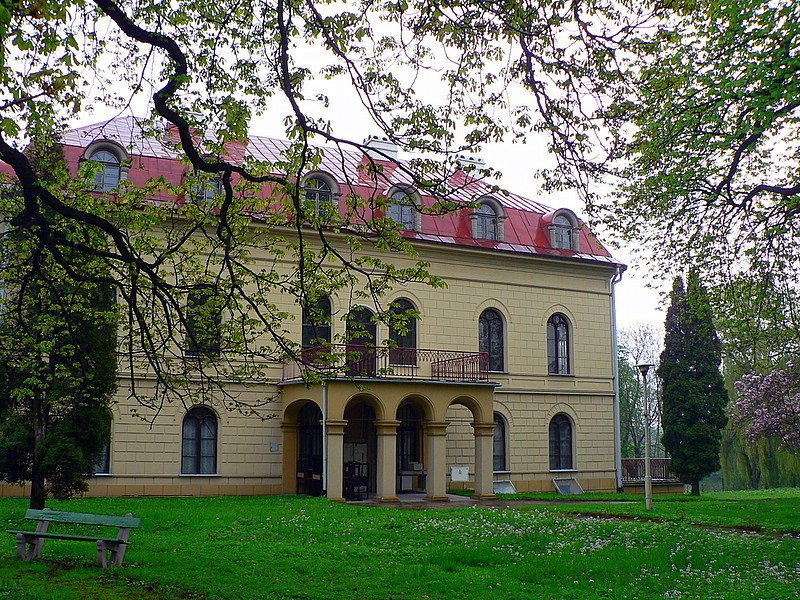
Palace in Grojec, Poland

Gmina Oświęcim is a rural gmina (administrative district) in Oświęcim County, Lesser Poland Voivodeship, in southern Poland. Its seat is the town of Oświęcim, although the town is not part of the territory of the gmina.

The gmina covers an area of 74.47 square kilometres (28.8 sq mi), and as of 2006 its total population is 16,708.

== Villages ==
Gmina Oświęcim contains the villages and settlements of Babice, Broszkowice, Brzezinka, Dwory II, Grojec, Harmęże, Łazy, Osada Stawy Grojeckie, Pławy, Poręba Wielka, Rajsko, Stawy Monowskie, Włosienica and Zaborze.

== Neighbouring gminas ==
Gmina Oświęcim is bordered by the towns of Bieruń and Oświęcim, and by the gminas of Bojszowy, Brzeszcze, Chełmek, Kęty, Libiąż, Miedźna, Osiek, Polanka Wielka and Przeciszów.
