= Poręba Wielka, Oświęcim County =

Poręba Wielka
- Village
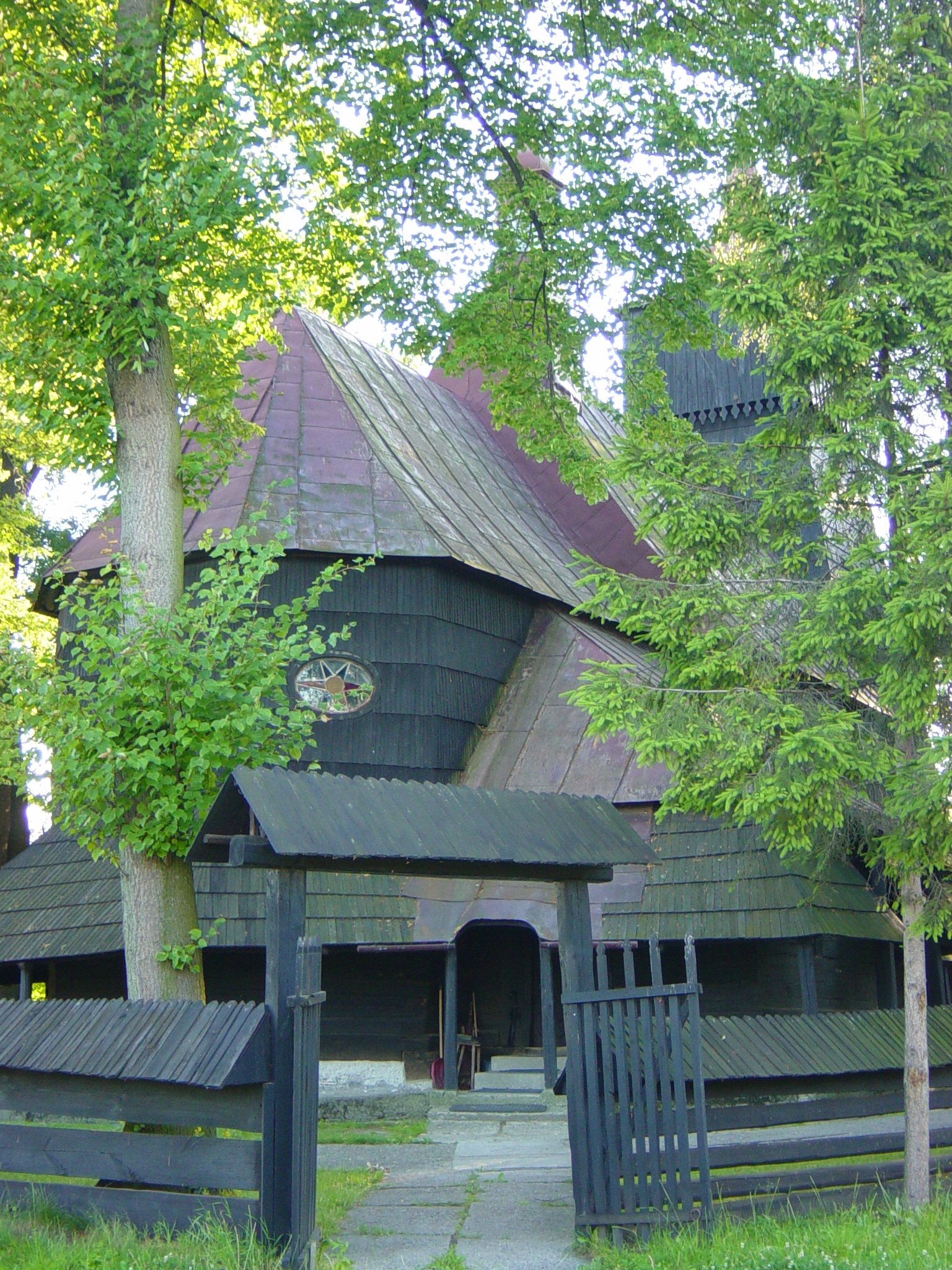
- Saint Bartholomew Church

- Coat of arms

- Location within Poland
- Coordinates: 50°0′N 19°17′E
- Country: Poland
- Voivodeship: Lesser Poland
- County: Oświęcim
- Gmina: Oświęcim
- Established: 1285
- Elevation: 240 m (790 ft)
- Population: 1,858

Poręba Wielka [pɔˈrɛmba ˈvjɛlka] is a village in the administrative district of Gmina Oświęcim, in Oświęcim County, Lesser Poland Voivodeship, in southern Poland.

== History ==
The village was established in 1285 by komes Adam under name Sępnia, which however did not endure long as the village was later mentioned in 1326 in the register of Peter's Pence payment among Catholic parishes of Oświęcim deaconry of the Diocese of Kraków as Paromba.

Politically it belonged initially to the Duchy of Racibórz and the Castellany of Oświęcim, which was in 1315 formed in the process of feudal fragmentation of Poland into the Duchy of Oświęcim, ruled by a local branch of the Silesian Piast dynasty. In 1327 the duchy became a fee of the Kingdom of Bohemia. In 1457 Jan IV of Oświęcim agreed to sell the duchy to the Polish Crown, and in the accompanying document issued on 21 February the village was mentioned as Poramba.

The territory of the Duchy of Oświęcim was eventually incorporated into Poland in 1564 and formed the Silesian County of Kraków Voivodeship. Upon the First Partition of Poland in 1772 it became part of the Austrian Kingdom of Galicia. After World War I and fall of Austria-Hungary it became part of Poland. It was annexed by Nazi Germany at the beginning of World War II, and afterwards it was restored to Poland.
