= Brzezinka =

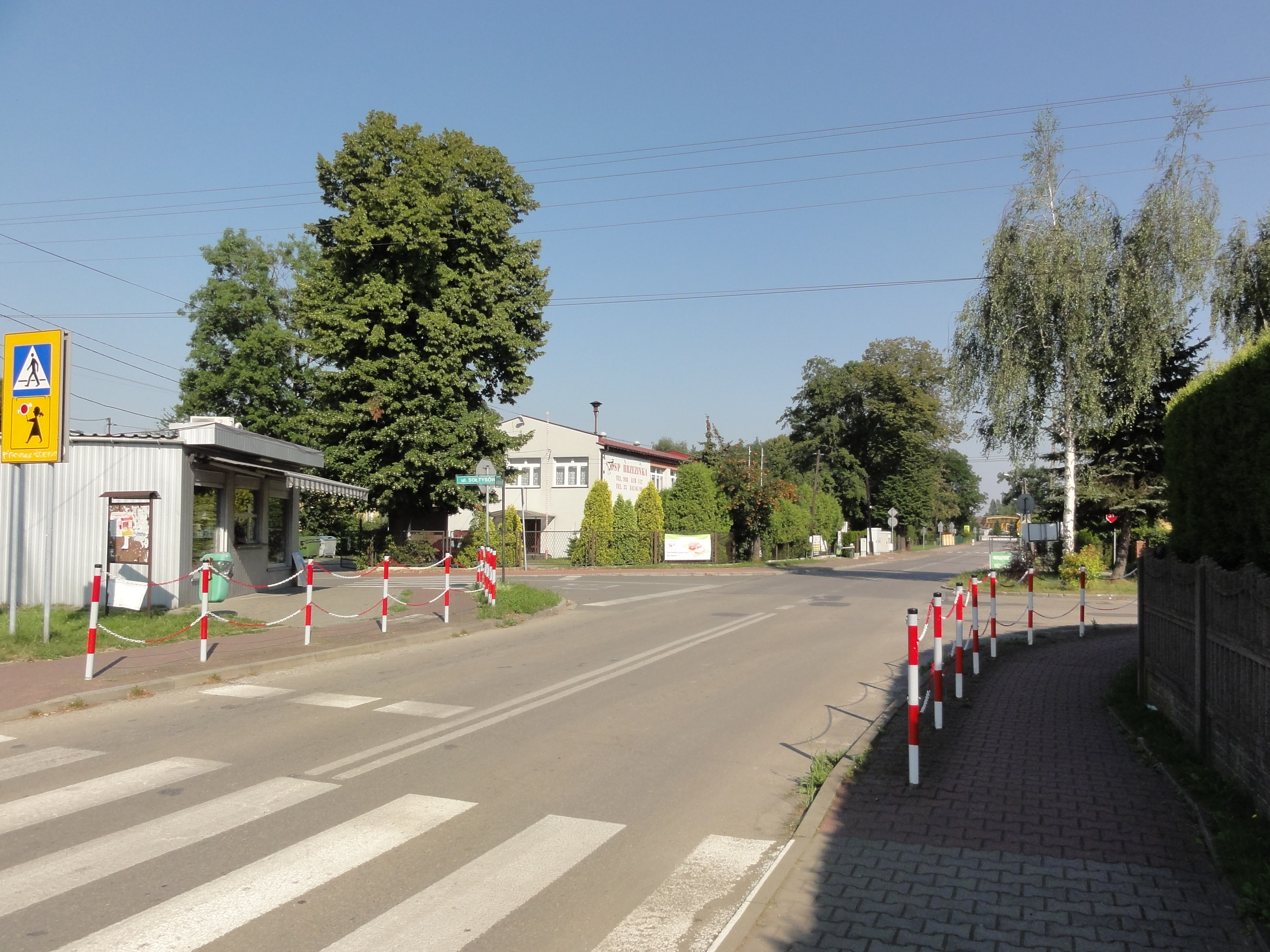

- Location within Poland
- Coordinates: 50°02′41″N 19°10′53″E
- Country: Poland
- Voivodeship: Lesser Poland
- County: Oświęcim
- Gmina: Oświęcim
- First mentioned: 1385
- Elevation: 240 m (790 ft)

Population (2006)
  - Total: 2,100
- Time zone: UTC+1 (CET)
  - Summer (DST): UTC+2 (CEST)
- Car plates: KOS

Brzezinka (Polish: [bʐɛˈʑiŋka], German: Birkenau) is a village in southern Poland, about 3 kilometres (1.9 mi) from Oświęcim, in the district of Gmina Oświęcim, Oświęcim County, Lesser Poland Voivodeship.

== General information ==
The village is near the confluence of the rivers Vistula and Soła, at the very center of the Vistula Valley, 240 meters above sea level. By the time of the construction of the first railroad station in 1856 the station was on Brzezinka's territory, but later it was included within the town limits of nearby Oświęcim.

Two major factories are found there: Fabryka Maszyn Górniczych "Omag", which in the 1930s as Spółka Akcyjna Zjednoczenia Fabryk Maszyn i Samochodów "Oświęcim" (Oświęcim United Machinery and Automobile Manufacturing Inc.) produced the "Oświęcim-Praga" car which won a Monte Carlo Rally; and the Polinova Company (popularly known as Papownia).

== History ==
The name of the village stems from birch trees (Polish: brzoza). It was first mentioned in 1385. From 1440 to 1483 Brzezinka was owned by Jan Brzeziński.

Politically the village belonged then to the Duchy of Oświęcim, formed in 1315 in the process of feudal fragmentation of Poland and was ruled by a local branch of Piast dynasty. In 1327 the duchy became a fee of the Kingdom of Bohemia. In 1457 Jan IV of Oświęcim agreed to sell the duchy to the Polish Crown, and in the accompanying document issued on 21 February the village was mentioned as Brzesinka. The territory of the Duchy of Oświęcim was eventually directly incorporated into Poland in 1564 and formed the Silesian County in the Kraków Voivodeship in the Lesser Poland Province. Upon the First Partition of Poland in 1772 it was annexed by Austria, and made part of its newly formed Kingdom of Galicia. In the late 19th century, it had a population of 1,025. After World War I and the fall of Austria-Hungary it became again part of Poland, as the nation regained independence.

Following the joint German-Soviet invasion of Poland, which started World War II in September 1939, the village was occupied and annexed by Nazi Germany. After this annexation the village was chosen by the Germans as the site of their Auschwitz-Birkenau (Auschwitz II) death camp, the centerpiece of the Final Solution to the Jewish Question, whose remains exist along with Auschwitz I as state museums to commemorate the victims of Nazism and the Holocaust. In connection with the construction of the camp, in 1941, the occupiers expelled the entire Polish population of the village, which was initially deported to the nearby Pszczyna County, and afterwards either enslaved as forced labour or deported to the General Government in the more eastern part of German-occupied Poland. Additionally, in 1943, the Germans established a subcamp of the Auschwitz concentration camp in the village, in which they enslaved hundreds of men (initially mostly Poles and Russians, and later mostly Jews) as slave labour. After the war, the village was restored to Poland.
