= Silesian County =

Polish subdivision

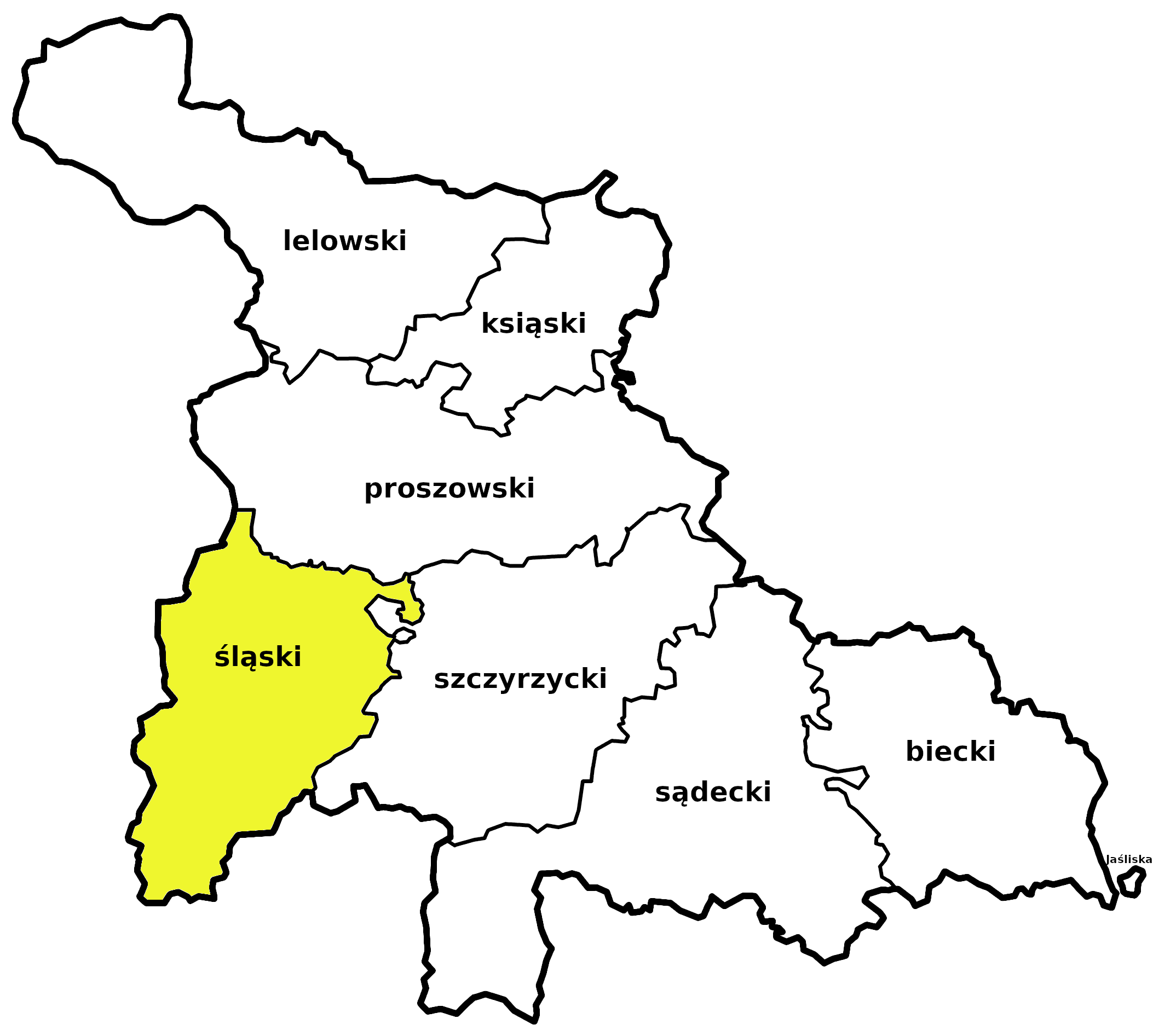
Silesian County within Kraków Voivodeship

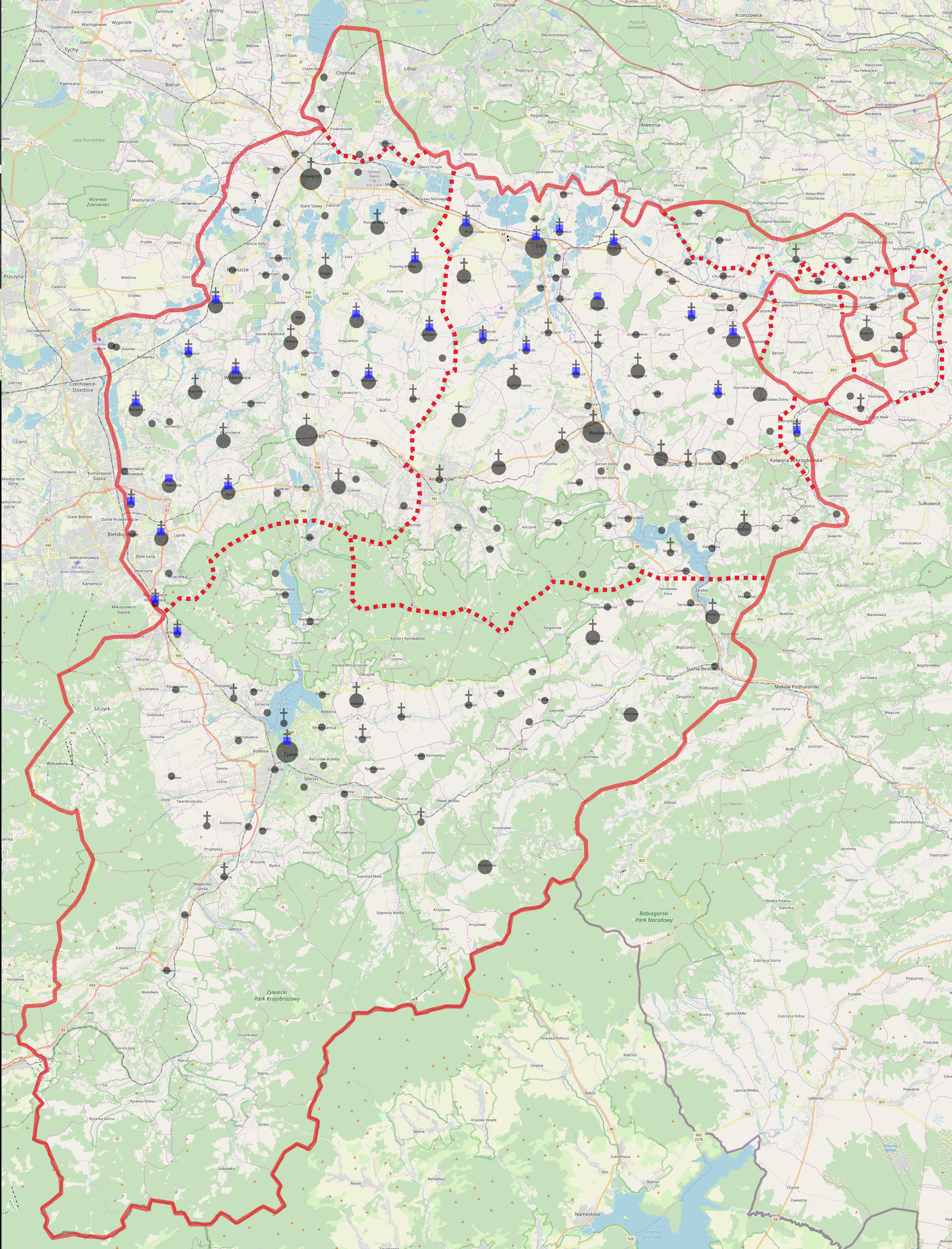
Silesian County imposed on a modern map and medieval ducal borders

The Silesian County (Polish: powiat śląski) was a county of the Kraków Voivodeship, within the Kingdom of Poland, Polish–Lithuanian Commonwealth. Its seats of government were located in the towns of Zator and Oświęcim. It existed from 1564 to 1795.

== History ==
Silesian County was created at the General Sejm in Warsaw, in 1564, when King Sigismund II Augustus merged territories of the Duchy of Zator and the Duchy of Oświęcim, incorporating them into the Kraków Voivodeship of the Polish Crown. The kings retained both ducal titles, and names of both duchies remained in common use. It existed for over 200 years, and was dissolved after the third partition of Poland (1795).

The total area of Silesian County was 2690 sq. kilometers, and initially consisted of four royal towns (Wadowice, Kęty, Oświęcim and Zator) and one private (Żywiec). In the second half of the 16th century the largest of them was Kęty, with over 1000 inhabitants. Of 188 villages, 38 had over 200 inhabitants. In 1617 a new private town of Zebrzydów, now Kalwaria Zebrzydowska, was founded. In 1723 town rights were granted to Biała, now part of Bielsko-Biała. The town was in the centre of a small German language island that consisted of several other villages. The rest of the County was inhabited by the vast majority of Polish Roman Catholics, although at the turn of the 17th century the county had the highest share of Protestants in the Kraków Voivodeship: 29% of the total number of churches were Protestant (mostly Reformed), they were present in 34 parishes and their number was estimated at 10 – 15 thousand.

The largest Jewish community lived since the late 16th century in Oświęcim, when they established the first Qahal, built a Synagogue and opened a Jewish school. In years 1747–1749 the deanery of Oświęcim counted 2462 Jews.
