= Oświęcim County =

Oświęcim County Powiat oświęcimski
- County
- Flag Coat of arms Logo

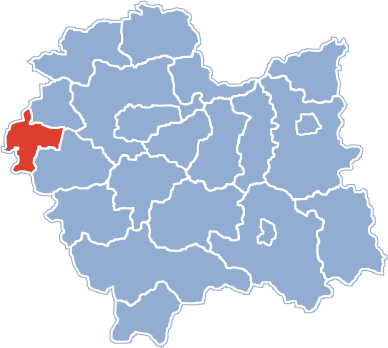
- Location within the voivodeship
- Coordinates (Oświęcim): 50°3′N 19°14′E
- Country: Poland
- Voivodeship: Lesser Poland
- Seat: Oświęcim
- Gminas: Total 9 (incl. 1 urban): Oświęcim; Gmina Brzeszcze; Gmina Chełmek; Gmina Kęty; Gmina Osiek; Gmina Oświęcim; Gmina Polanka Wielka; Gmina Przeciszów; Gmina Zator

Area
  - Total: 406.03 km^{2} (156.77 sq mi)

Population (2006)
  - Total: 153,390
  - Density: 377.78/km^{2} (978.45/sq mi)
  - Urban: 84,752
  - Rural: 68,638
- Car plates: KOS
- Website: www.powiat.oswiecim.pl

Oświęcim County (Polish: powiat oświęcimski) is a unit of territorial administration and local government (powiat) in Lesser Poland Voivodeship, southern Poland. It came into being on January 1, 1999, as a result of the Polish local government reforms passed in 1998. Its administrative seat and largest town is Oświęcim, which lies 51 kilometres (32 mi) west of the regional capital Kraków. The county contains four other towns: Kęty, 17 km (11 mi) south of Oświęcim, Brzeszcze, 9 km (6 mi) south-west of Oświęcim, Chełmek, 8 km (5 mi) north of Oświęcim, and Zator, 16 km (10 mi) east of Oświęcim.

The county covers an area of 406.03 square kilometres (156.8 sq mi). As of 2006, its total population is 153,390, out of which the population of Oświęcim is 40,979, that of Kęty is 19,252, that of Brzeszcze is 11,730, that of Chełmek is 9,065, that of Zator is 3,726, and the rural population is 68,638.

The county contains the sites of the Auschwitz concentration camp complex (Auschwitz being the German name for Oświęcim).

== Neighbouring counties ==
Oświęcim County is bordered by the city of Jaworzno to the north, Chrzanów County to the north-east, Wadowice County to the south-east, Bielsko County to the south, Pszczyna County to the west and Bieruń-Lędziny County to the north-west.

== Administrative division ==
The county is subdivided into nine gminas (one urban, four urban-rural and four rural). These are listed in the following table, in descending order of population.

Gmina	Type	Area (km^{2})	Population (2006)	Seat
Oświęcim	urban	30.3	40,979	
Gmina Kęty	urban-rural	75.8	33,598	Kęty
Gmina Brzeszcze	urban-rural	46.1	21,557	Brzeszcze
Gmina Oświęcim	rural	74.5	16,708	Oświęcim *
Gmina Chełmek	urban-rural	27.2	12,827	Chełmek
Gmina Zator	urban-rural	51.4	9,049	Zator
Gmina Osiek	rural	41.2	7,857	Osiek
Gmina Przeciszów	rural	35.4	6,679	Przeciszów
Gmina Polanka Wielka	rural	24.1	4,136	Polanka Wielka
* seat not part of the gmina
