= List of subcamps of Auschwitz =

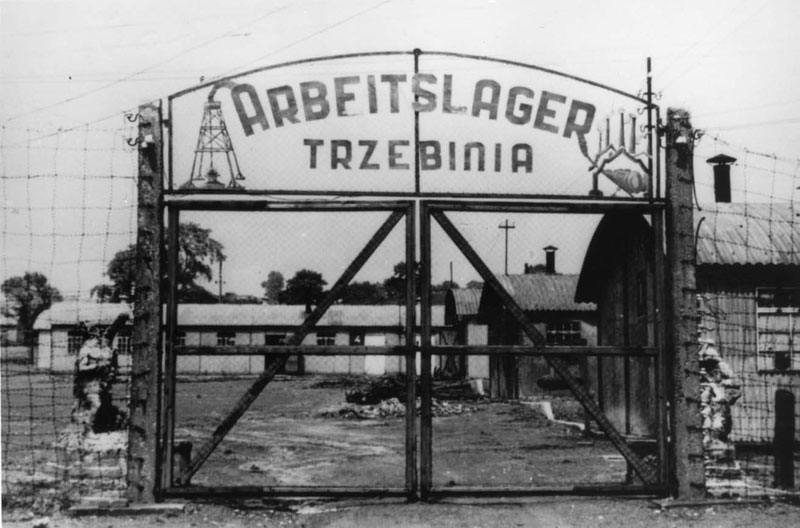
Entrance to Trzebinia, a subcamp of the Auschwitz concentration camp, 1945

The Auschwitz concentration camp complex was a system of concentration camps (German: Konzentrationslager, abbreviated as either KL or KZ) (Note: Nikolaus Wachsmann (KL: A History of the Nazi Concentration Camps, 2015): "The term "KL" remained the main SS abbreviation for concentration camps throughout the Third Reich. For popular references to "KL", see The Times, January 24, 1935, NCC, doc. 277. Prisoners also applied the term, though they more commonly used the harsher sounding "KZ", which became the standard abbreviation in postwar Germany." The Times (24 January 1935): "Permits to visit are no longer obtainable, and everyone knows that the threat of "K.L."—the popular contraction for Konzentrationslager—is meant to be a very unpleasant one.") run by Nazi Germany in occupied Poland from 1940 to 1945. The main camp (German: Stammlager) was Auschwitz I. Auschwitz II, or Birkenau, was a concentration and extermination camp, and became the most notorious of the camps. Auschwitz III, or Monowitz, was a labour camp.

In addition to the three largest camps, Auschwitz consisted of several subcamps. The satellite camps were named Aussenlager (external camp), Nebenlager (extension or subcamp), and Arbeitslager (labour camp). Several lay within 10 km (6.2 mi) of the main camp, with prisoner populations ranging from dozens to several thousand.

== KL Auschwitz ==
=== Administration ===
As the size and purpose of Auschwitz changed during World War II, its structure and chain of command changed too. From 1940 to late 1943, Auschwitz I was the Stammlager and the other camps were subordinate to it. In November 1943 Birkenau and Monowitz became independent camps with their own commandants, although the commandant of Auschwitz I remained the senior officer. Auschwitz I and Birkenau were placed back under one command in November 1944, and Auschwitz III was named Monowitz.

=== Commandants ===
- Auschwitz I: Rudolf Höss (May 1940 – November 1943), Arthur Liebehenschel from (November 1943 – May 1944), Richard Baer (May 1944 – 27 January 1945)
- Birkenau: Fritz Hartjenstein (November 1943 – May 1944), Josef Kramer (May 1944 – November 1944). Other: Johann Schwarzhuber (overseer, men's camp, November 1943 – November 1944)
- Monowitz: Heinrich Schwarz (November 1943 – January 1945)

=== Subcamps ===
The known subcamps of the Auschwitz complex included:

#	Name of the subcamp	Location	Life time	Number of prisoners	Tenant
Sub-camps at livestock farms
1.	Harmense (Geflügelfarm)	Harmęże	Dec 1941 – Jan 1945	About 150 prisoners	For purposes of KL
2.	Budy (Wirtschaftshof)	Brzeszcze	Apr 1942 – Jan 1945	700-800 prisoners	For purposes of KL
3.	Babitz (Wirtschaftshof)	Babice near Oświęcim	Mar 1943 – Jan 1945	About 340 prisoners	For purposes of KL
4.	Birkenau (Wirtschaftshof)	Brzezinka near Oświęcim	1943 – Jan 1945	More than 200 prisoners	For purposes of KL
5.	Raisko (Gärtnerei)	Rajsko	Jun 1944 – Jan 1945	About 300 female prisoners	For purposes of KL and SS research
6.	Plawy (Wirtschaftshof)	Pławy	Dec 1944 – Jan 1945	About 200 prisoners	For purposes of KL
Sub-camps at industrial plants
7.	Golleschau	Goleszów	Jul 1942 – Jan 1945	About 1,000 prisoners	Ostdeutsche Baustoffwerke GmbH
8.	Jawischowitz	Jawiszowice	Aug 1942 – Jan 1945	More than 2,500 prisoners	Reichswerke Hermann Göring
9.	Chelmek (Aussenkommando)	Chełmek	Oct 1942 – Dec 1942	About 150 prisoners	Ota Schlesische Schuhwerke ("Bata Shoes")
10.	Monowitz Buna-Werke	Monowice near Oświęcim	Oct 1942 – Jan 1945	10,223 prisoners in three IG Farben locations as of 17 January 1945.	–
11.	Eintrachthütte	Eintrachthütte concentration camp in Świętochłowice	May 1943 – Jan 1945	1,374 prisoners	Berghütte
12.	Neu-Dachs	Jaworzno	Jun 1943 – Jan 1945	More than 3,500 prisoners	Energieversorgung Oberschlesien Aktiengesellschaft (EVO)
13.	Fürstengrube	Wesoła near Mysłowice	Sep 1943 – Jan 1945	700–1,200 prisoners	IG Farben
14.	Janinagrube (Gute Hoffnung)	Libiąż	Sep 1943 – Jan 1945	877 prisoners	IG Farben
15.	Lagischa	Łagisza, now Będzin	Sep 1943 – Sep 1944	About 1,000 prisoners	Energie-Versorgung Oberschlesien AG
16.	Günthergrube	Lędziny	Feb 1944 – Jan 1945	300-600 prisoners	IG Farben
17.	Gleiwitz I	Gliwice	Mar 1944 – Jan 1945	About 1,300 prisoners	Reichsbahnausbesserungswerk
18.	Laurahütte	Siemianowice Śląskie	Mar/Apr 1944 – Jan 1945	1,000 prisoners	Rheinmetall Borsig AG
19.	Blechhammer	Blechhammer concentration camp near Sławięcice	Apr 1944 – Jan 1945	609 prisoners	O/S Hydrierwerke AG
20.	Bobrek	Bobrek concentration camp near Oświęcim	May 1944 – Jan 1945	About 50–213 prisoners and about 50 female prisoners	Siemens-Schuckert
21.	Gleiwitz II	Gliwice	May 1944 – Jan 1945	More than 1,000 prisoners	Deutsche Gasrusswerke
22.	Sosnowitz II	Sosnowiec	May 1944 – Jan 1945	About 900 prisoners	Ost Maschinenbau GmbH (Berghüte)
23.	Gleiwitz III	Gliwice	Jul 1944 – Jan 1945	450–600 prisoners	Zieleniewski - Maschinen und Waggonbau GmbH - Krakau
24.	Hindenburg	Zabrze	Aug 1944 – Jan 1945	About 400-500 female prisoners and about 70 prisoners	Vereinigte Oberschlesische Hüttenwerke AG (Oberhütten)
25.	Trzebinia	Trzebionka near Trzebinia	Aug 1944 – Jan 1945	600-800 prisoners	Erdölraffinerie Trzebinia GmbH
26.	Tschechowitz I Bombensucherkommando	Czechowice-Dziedzice	Aug 1944 – Sep 1944	About 100 prisoners	Reichsbahn
27.	Althammer	Stara Kuźnia near Halemby, now Ruda Śląska	Sep 1944 – Jan 1945	About 500 prisoners	
28.	Bismarckhütte	Chorzów	Sep 1944 – Jan 1945	About 200 prisoners	Berghütte (for its Bismarck steel mill at Chorzów Batory)
29.	Charlottengrube	Rydułtowy	Sep 1944 – Jan 1945	About 1,000 prisoners	Reichswerke Hermann Göring
30.	Neustadt	Prudnik	Sep 1944 – Jan 1945	About 400 female prisoners	Schlesische Feinweberei AG
31.	Tschechowitz II Vacuum	Czechowice-Dziedzice	Sep 1944 – Jan 1945	About 600 prisoners	
32.	Hubertshütte	Łagiewniki, now Bytom	Dec 1944 – Jan 1945	200 prisoners	Berghütte-Königs und Birmarckhütte AG
33.	Freudenthal	Bruntal	1944 – Jan 1945	About 300 female prisoners	Emmerich Machold
34.	Lichtewerden	Světlá (now Czech Republic)	Nov 1944 – Jan 1945	About 300 female prisoners	G.A. Buhl und Sohn
Sub-camps with various functions
35.	Sosnitz	Sośnica near Gliwice	Jul 1940 – Aug 1940	About 30 prisoners	For purposes of KL
36.	Porombka (SS-Hütte, Solahütte)	Międzybrodzie Bialskie	Oct/Nov 1940 – Jan 1945	About 50 prisoners and about 10 female prisoners	For purposes of SS
37.	Altdorf	Stara Wieś near Pszczyna	Oct 1942 – 1943	About 20 prisoners	Oberforstamt Pless (Pszczyna forestry authority)
38.	Radostowitz	Radostowice near Pszczyna	1942 – 1943	About 20 prisoners	Oberforstamt Pless
39.	Kobier (Aussenkommando)	Kobiór	1942 – Sep 1943	About 150 prisoners	Oberforstamt Pless
40.	Brünn	Brno	Oct 1943 – Apr 1945	250–150 prisoners	For purposes of SS
41.	Sosnowitz (I)	Sosnowiec	Aug 1943 – Feb 1944	About 100 prisoners	
42.	Gleiwitz IV	Gliwice	Jun 1944 – Jan 1945	About 500 prisoners	For purposes of SS
43.	Kattowitz (Sonderkommando)	Katowice	Jan 1944 – Jan 1945	10 prisoners	Gestapo
44.	Bauzug (2 SS)	Karlsruhe, after Stuttgart	Sep 1944 – Oct 1944	About 500 prisoners living in a train	SS-WVHA

== See also ==
- Massacre in Budy
- List of Nazi concentration camps
- Subcamp (SS)
