= Zygmunt Szczotkowski =

Polish mining engineer

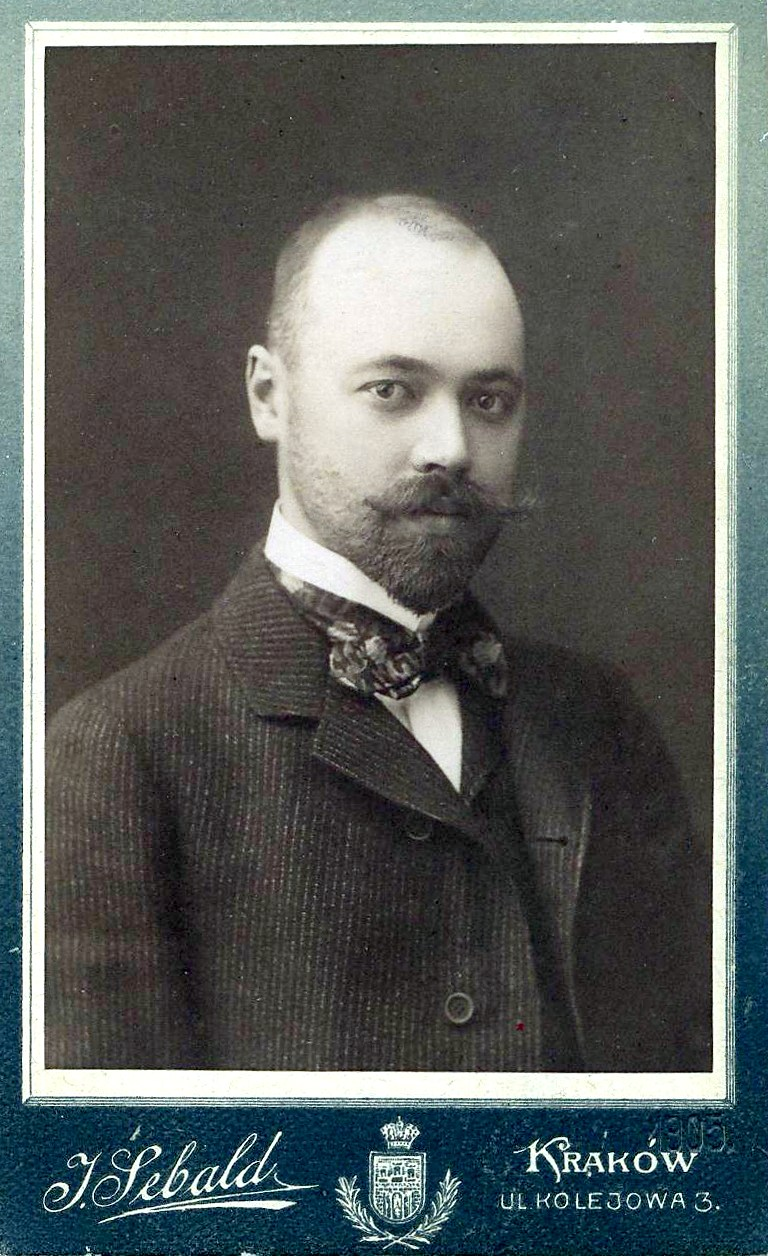
Zygmunt Szczotkowski in 1905

Zygmunt Franciszek Szczotkowski (17 September 1877 (Note: All dates in this article, unless specified otherwise, are written according to the New Style) in Warsaw – 9 February 1943 in Bieżanów) was a Polish mining engineer and the first Polish manager of the Janina Coal Mine in Libiąż.

== Early life ==
He was the son of Stefan Wincenty Andrzej (b. 1 February 1843 (Note: Most likely according to the Old Style dating)) in the Stefanpole manor near Riebiņi, in a family of former Inflanty landowners (Note: Zygmunt's grandfather Alfons Stefanowicz Szczotkowski (d. 1846) was an assessor, and his uncle – a nobleman from a Latgale powiat of Ludza, Jan Mateusz, a younger brother of Stefan Wincenty) (Note: In Latvian national archives which maintain copies of the Russian Empire census data from 1897, Ludza powiat datasheets in Vitebsk Governorate shows an entry on p. 527/669 related to Jan Mateusz Szczotkowski, living in Ludza with his wife, three daughters and a Belarusian servant) of Łodzia coat of arms. Stefan was a railroad civil servant and a resident of the Stefanowo residence near Włocławek and Maria Filomena, born Kolbe, (Note: Among the Kolbe family members there was also a Bronisław Kolbe, born in Włocławek, later to become a mining engineer and a director in a few mining and processing plants in Silesia and Zagłebie Dąbrowskie) born 1849 in Włocławek, died 21 February 1931 in Libiąż. As a young man, Stefan Szczotkowski supported the cause of the January Uprising, for which the Szczotkowski family was punished with the loss of their property, and Stefan himself was forced to migrate into far East of Russia. (Note: After three years, he was allowed to travel to Congress Poland; the central national archives of Chuvashia (ЦГА ЧР.) in Cheboksary contain records of Stefan's compulsory stay in Tsivilsk (ЦГА ЧР. Ф.122. Оп.1.Д.7. Л.58; ЦГА ЧР. Ф.122. Оп.1.Д.9.Л.132; ЦГА ЧР. Ф.122. Оп.1.Д.28. Л.60; ЦГА ЧР. Ф.122. Оп.1.Д.2б. Л.46)) He arrived in Warsaw in 1867 and got married there. Soon after, he became ill with tuberculosis and died when his son was two years old.

Zygmunt's mother moved to her family in Włocławek where young Zygmunt started his education. Later in his life his mother decided to move back to Warsaw where 18-year-old Zygmunt finished gymnasium. After finishing the secondary school he began studying in University of Leoben's mining faculty (Austria). He graduated it in 1900. After graduating he decided to take part in an expedition to the Ural Mountains but quickly changed his mind and decided to stay in Poland.

== Professional career ==
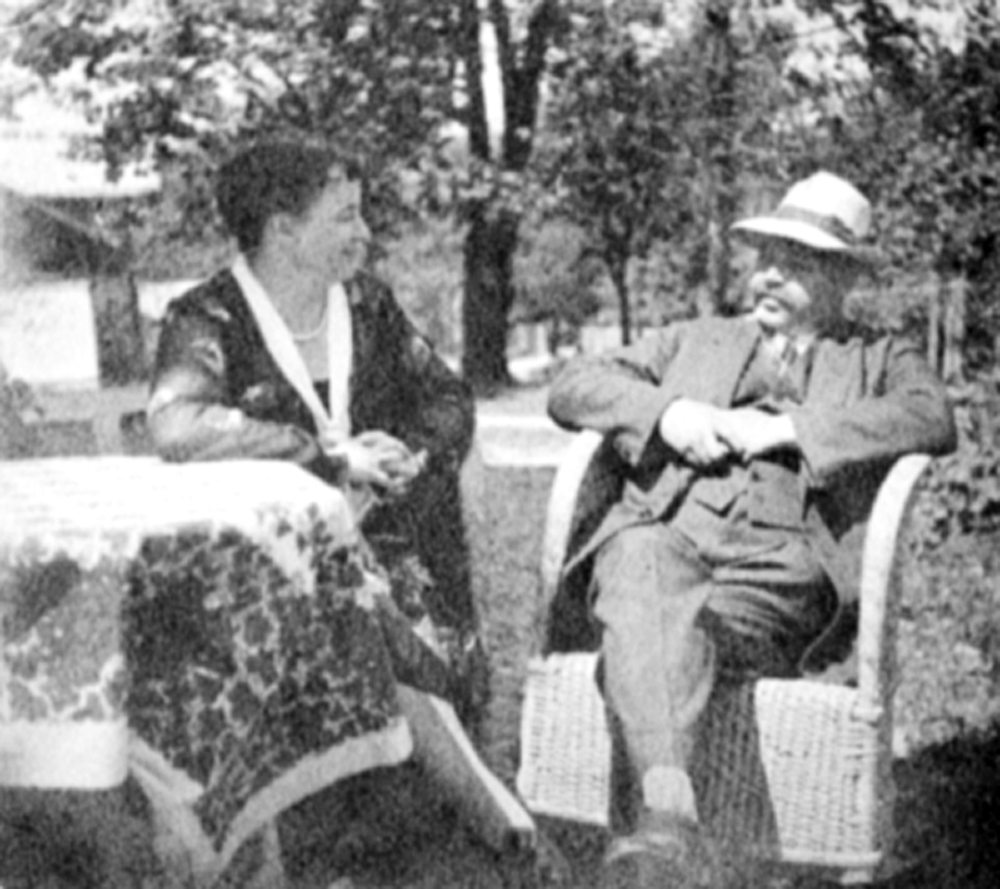
Zygmunt Szczotkowski with his wife, 1936

In January 1901 he passed an examination before the Mining Board and in 1901-1906 he worked as a supervising engineer in one of the shafts of the Niwka coal mine near Sosnowiec. From July 1906 he supervised a coal mine Saturn in Czeladź. In 1913 he resigned his position and traveled to France and Belgium to learn the latest technologies in mine rescue. He planned to build a mine rescue station in Sosnowiec. He returned to Warsaw in 1914 where he became the manager of Biuro Stacyjne Sekcji Opałowej (Station Bureau, Fuel Section) until 1919. While in Warsaw he passed the examination for a public servant. In 1919 he directed mining operations near Zawiercie.

On 1 March 1920 he became the chief engineer of Compagnie Galicienne de Mines in Libiąż and on 18 December he was also nominated as the Polish president of the one of mines of the company – Janina Coal Mine. In the interwar period he took active part in the development of the Central Industrial Region; he also cooperated closely with the former Leopold Skulski government minister for industry and trade (1919-1920), Antoni Olszewski (in 1935-1937 he was a member of Olszewski's Committee for the Investigation of National Enterprises, the so-called Statism Committee) and with a former Minister of Transport in the governments of Kazimierz Bartel and Józef Piłsudski, later to become the manager of the Trzebinia Coal Mine, Paweł Romocki. For his merits for the Polish industry, on 11 November 1937, Szczotkowski was awarded the Knight's Cross of Order of Polonia Restituta.

After the break out of World War II, from 18 September 1939 until 3 June 1940 he continued working in the mine and he was employed by the Germans as an acting manager (Treuhänder). Around that time he was arrested by the Gestapo and accused of sabotage, he was released without any charges and continued to work in the mine. In summer or autumn of 1940 he left Libiąż and joined his family who since 1 September 1939 was living in Bieżanów. He died three years later after a long illness caused by cardiovascular disease.
