= Marek Harat =

Polish neurosurgeon

- Born: 1958 (age 66–67); Libiąż
- Occupation: Neurosurgeon

Marek Harat (born 1958 in Libiąż) is a Polish neurosurgeon, professor of medical sciences (2002, doctorate 1988, habilitation 1997), colonel of the reserve. In 1993, he completed an internship in Canada, including at Toronto Western Hospital. Author of a number of publications and innovative neurosurgical procedures (including psychosurgery), including those related to deep brain stimulation. Promoter and reviewer of doctoral theses. Clinical Consultant in Neurosurgery at the 10th Military Clinical Hospital with Polyclinic in Bydgoszcz, he also works at the Medical College in Bydgoszcz of the Nicolaus Copernicus University in Torun. He was awarded the Bronze Cross of Merit (2004).

In 2018, he was awarded the title "Promoter of Poland" by the Board of the Promotional Emblem Foundation "Now Poland" in recognition of his achievements in the field of neurosurgery.

== Bibliography ==
- Harat M. (ed.) Functional neurosurgery. NEXT Publishing House, Bydgoszcz 2007. ISBN 978-83-926225-0-5
