= Gmina Brzeszcze =

Gmina Brzeszcze Brzeszcze Commune
- Gmina
- Coat of arms
- Interactive map of Gmina Brzeszcze
- Coordinates (Brzeszcze): 50°0′N 19°9′E
- Country: Poland
- Voivodeship: Lesser Poland
- County: Oświęcim
- Seat: Brzeszcze

Area
  - Total: 46.13 km^{2} (17.81 sq mi)

Population (2006)
  - Total: 21,557
  - Density: 467.3/km^{2} (1,210/sq mi)
  - Urban: 11,730
  - Rural: 9,827
- Website: http://www.brzeszcze.pl

Gmina Brzeszcze is an urban-rural gmina (administrative district) in Oświęcim County, Lesser Poland Voivodeship, in southern Poland. Its seat is the town of Brzeszcze, which lies approximately 9 kilometres (6 mi) south-west of Oświęcim and 57 km (35 mi) west of the regional capital Kraków.

The gmina covers an area of 46.13 square kilometres (17.8 sq mi), and as of 2006 its total population is 21,557, of which the population of Brzeszcze is 11,730, and the population of the rural part of the gmina is 9,827.

== Villages ==
Apart from the town of Brzeszcze, Gmina Brzeszcze contains the villages and settlements of Jawiszowice, Przecieszyn, Skidziń, Wilczkowice and Zasole.

== Neighbouring gminas ==
Gmina Brzeszcze is bordered by the gminas of Kęty, Miedźna, Oświęcim and Wilamowice.
