= Pisarzowice, Bielsko County =

Pisarzowice Śrajwadiüf
- Village
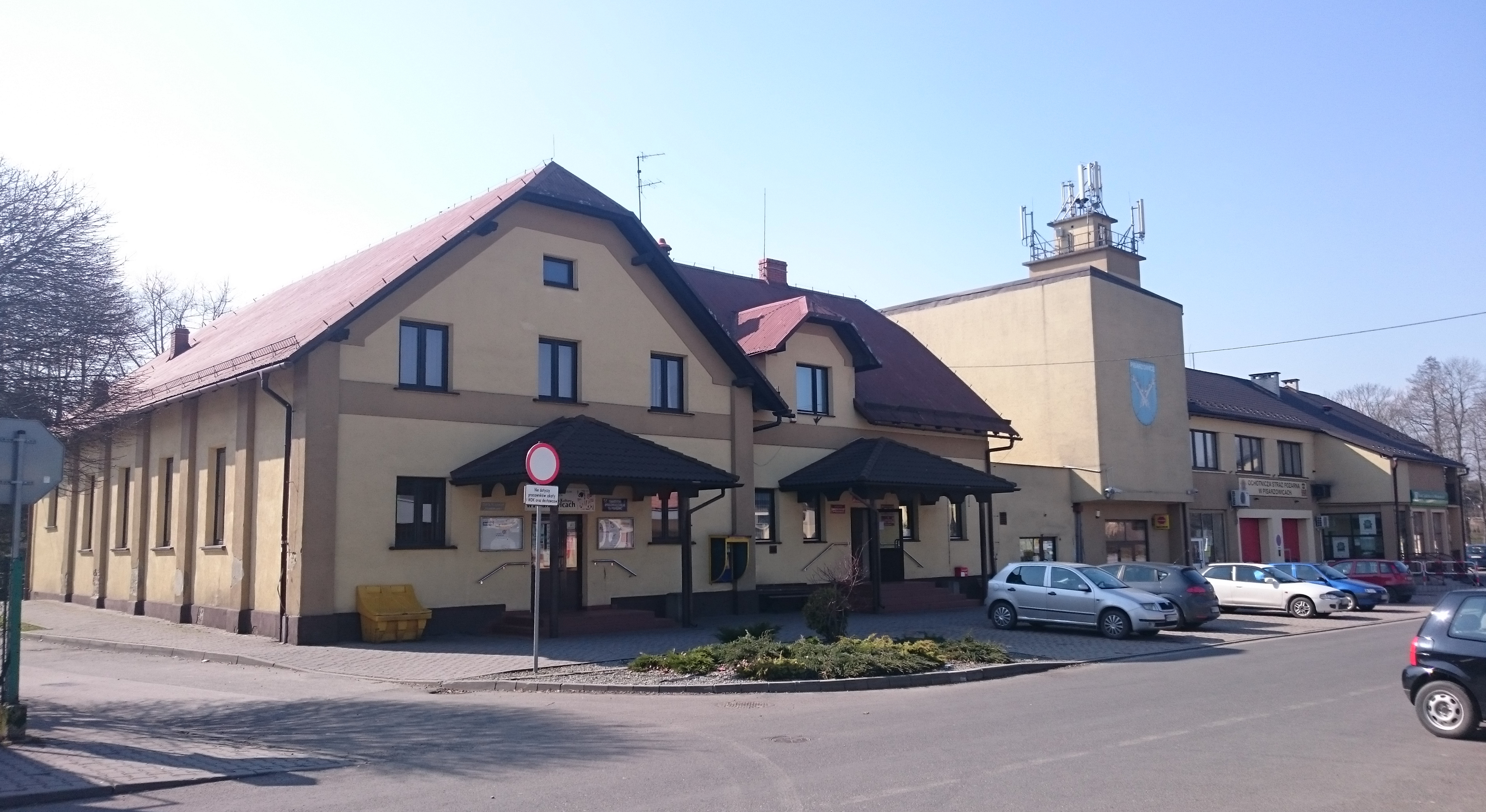
- Buildings in the village centre

- Coat of arms

- Location within Poland
- Coordinates: 49°53′N 19°8′E
- Country: Poland
- Voivodeship: Silesian
- County: Bielsko
- Gmina: Wilamowice
- First mentioned: 1326
- Population: 6 189
- Website: https://gmina.wilamowice.pl/

Pisarzowice [pisaʐɔˈvit͡sɛ] (Wymysorys: Śrajwadiüf) is a village in the administrative district of Gmina Wilamowice, within Bielsko County, Silesian Voivodeship, in southern Poland.

== History ==
The village was first mentioned in 1326 in the register of Peter's Pence payment among Catholic parishes of Oświęcim deaconry of the Diocese of Kraków as Villa scriptoris. It is possible that it was founded by Władysław I Herman (1246-1281), the Duke of Opole after Mongol raids in the first half of the 13th century.

Politically the village belonged then to the Duchy of Oświęcim, formed in 1315 in the process of feudal fragmentation of Poland and was ruled by a local branch of Piast dynasty. In 1327 the duchy became a fee of the Kingdom of Bohemia. In 1457 Jan IV of Oświęcim agreed to sell the duchy to the Polish Crown, and in the accompanying document issued on 21 February the village was mentioned as Pyszarowicze.

The territory of the Duchy of Oświęcim was eventually incorporated into Poland in 1564 and formed Silesian County of Kraków Voivodeship. Upon the First Partition of Poland in 1772 it became part of the Austrian Kingdom of Galicia. After World War I and fall of Austria-Hungary it became part of Poland. It was annexed by Nazi Germany at the beginning of World War II, and afterwards it was restored to Poland.
