= Zasole Bielańskie =

- Village
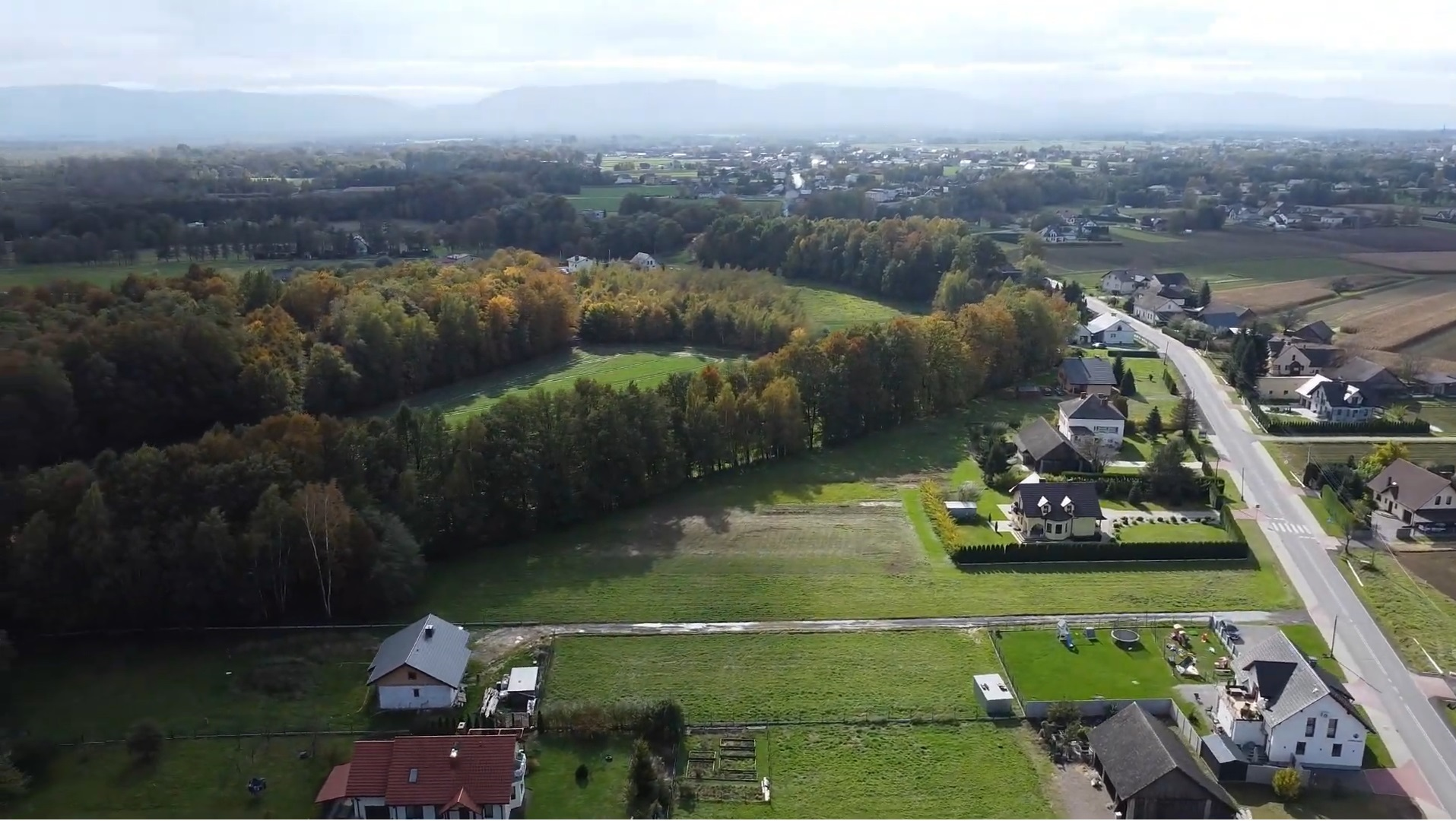

- Location within Poland
- Coordinates: 49°55′N 19°10′E
- Country: Poland
- Voivodeship: Silesian
- County: Bielsko
- Gmina: Wilamowice
- Population: 746

Zasole Bielańskie [zaˈsɔlɛ bjɛˈlaɲskʲɛ] is a village in the administrative district of Gmina Wilamowice, within Bielsko County, Silesian Voivodeship, in southern Poland.
