= Gmina Wilamowice =

Gmina Wilamowice Wilamowice Commune
- Gmina
- Coat of arms

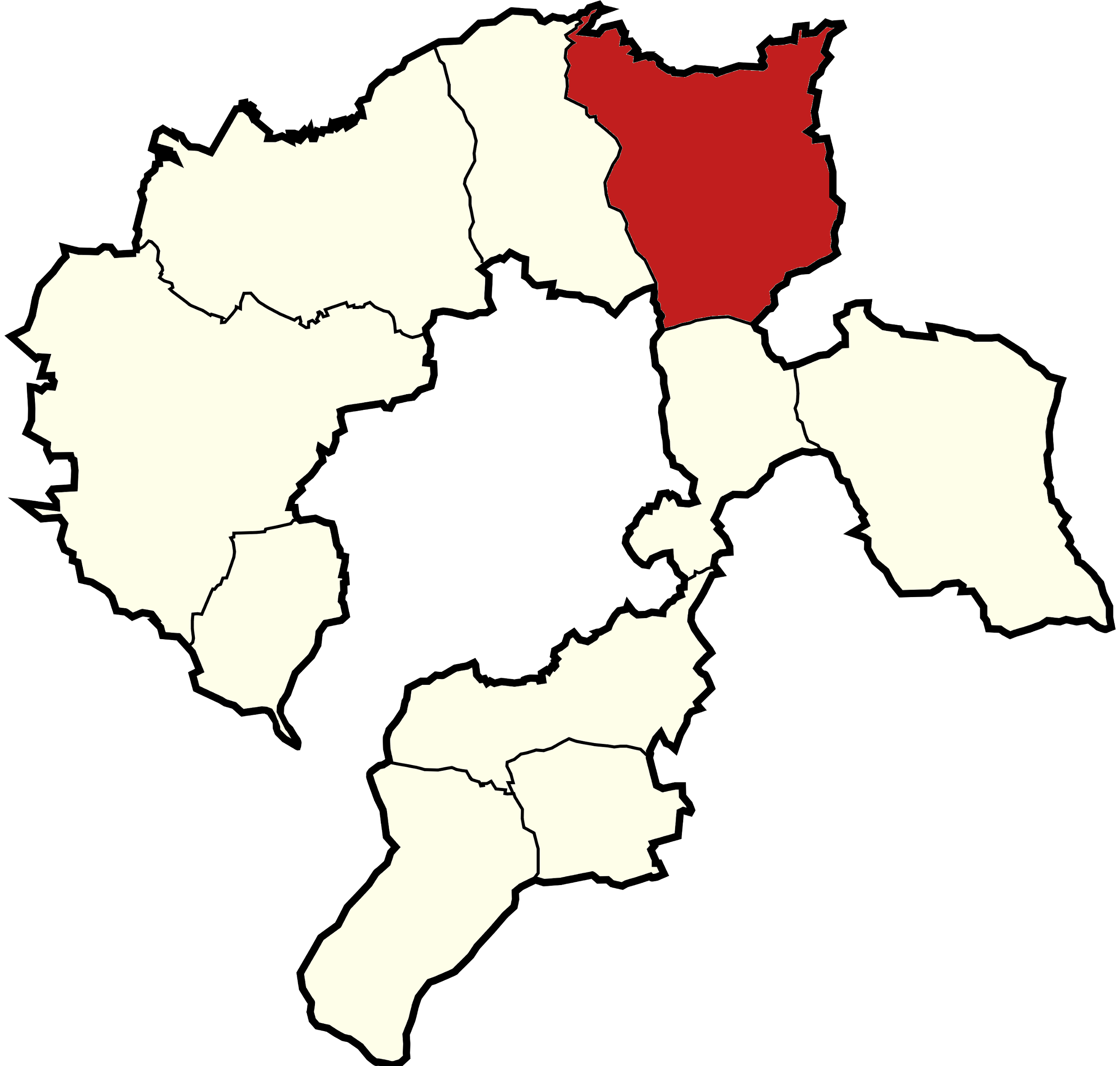
- Gmina Wilamowice within the Bielsko County
- Coordinates (Wilamowice): 49°54′59″N 19°9′7″E
- Country: Poland
- Voivodeship: Silesian
- County: Bielsko
- Seat: Wilamowice

Area
  - Total: 56.72 km^{2} (21.90 sq mi)

Population (2019-06-30)
  - Total: 17,613
  - Density: 310.5/km^{2} (804.3/sq mi)
  - Urban: 3,100
  - Rural: 14,513
- Website: http://www.gmina.wilamowice.pl

Gmina Wilamowice is an urban-rural gmina (administrative district) in Bielsko County, Silesian Voivodeship, in southern Poland. Its seat is the town of Wilamowice, which lies approximately 12 kilometres (7 mi) north-east of Bielsko-Biała and 39 km (24 mi) south of the regional capital Katowice. It is known for the Wymysorys language, which is spoken by some of the people here, mainly among the Vilamovian ethnic minority in Wilamowice.

The gmina covers an area of 56.72 square kilometres (21.9 sq mi), and as of 2019 its total population is 17,613.

== Villages ==
Apart from the town of Wilamowice, Gmina Wilamowice contains the villages and settlements of Dankowice, Hecznarowice, Pisarzowice, Stara Wieś and Zasole Bielańskie.

== Neighbouring gminas ==
Gmina Wilamowice is bordered by the city of Bielsko-Biała and by the gminas of Bestwina, Brzeszcze, Kęty, Kozy and Miedźna.

== Twin towns – sister cities ==
Gmina Wilamowice is twinned with:

- Dolní Benešov, Czech Republic
- Horná Súča, Slovakia
- Kisújszállás, Hungary
- Klanjec, Croatia
- Kloštar Ivanić, Croatia
- Kunerad, Slovakia
- Rajecké Teplice, Slovakia
- Trenčianske Teplice, Slovakia
- Županja, Croatia
