= Dolní Benešov =

- Town
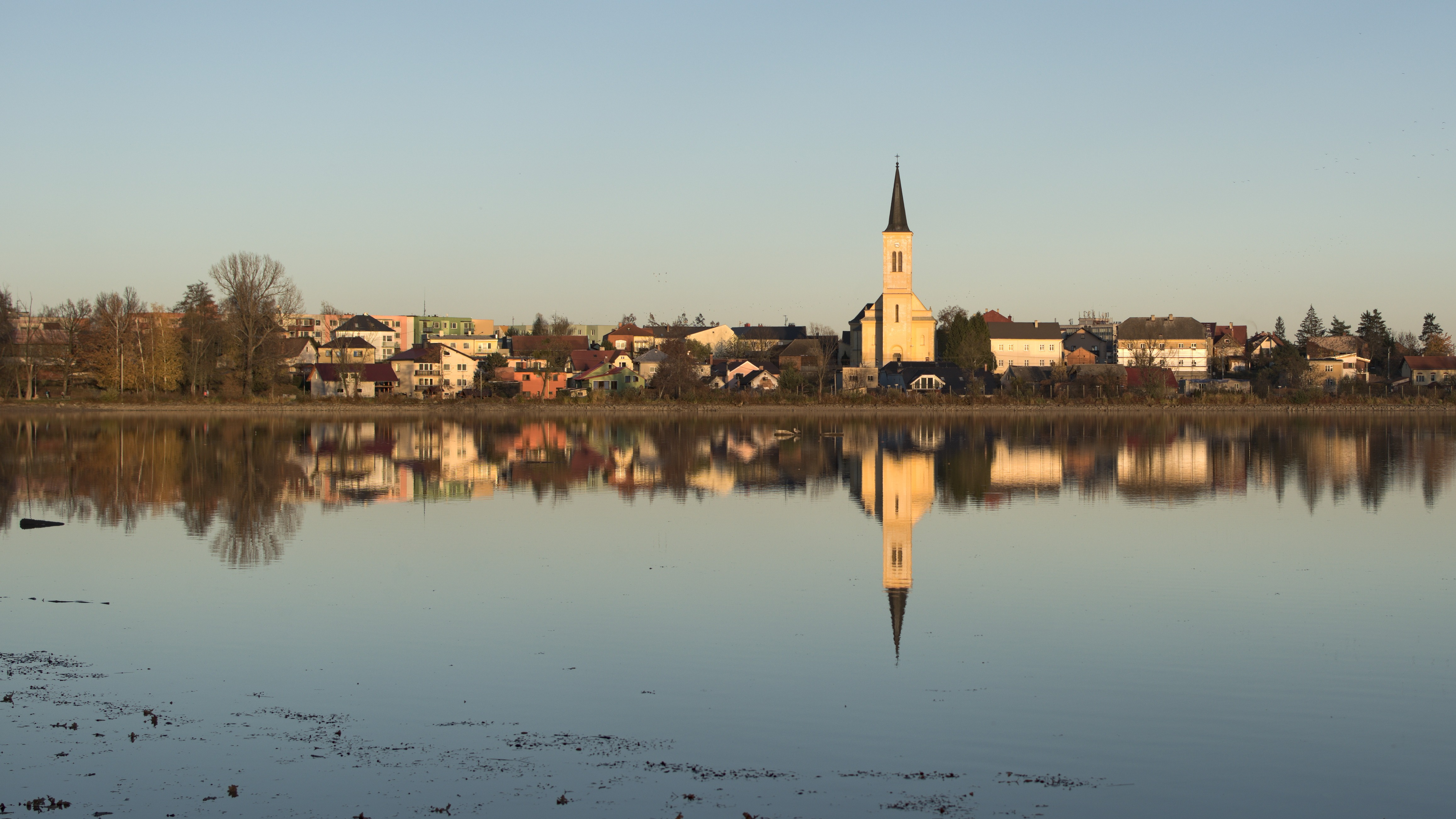
- Dolní Benešov seen over the Nezmar pond

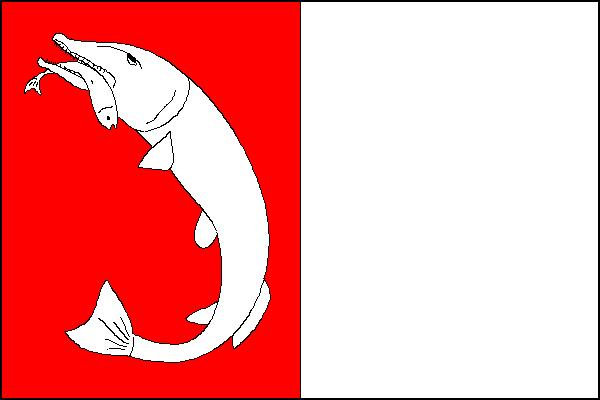
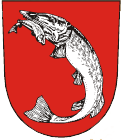
- Flag Coat of arms

- Location in the Czech Republic
- Coordinates: 49°55′16″N 18°6′30″E
- Country: Czech Republic
- Region: Moravian-Silesian
- District: Opava
- First mentioned: 1312

Government
  - Mayor: Jan Widlák

Area
  - Total: 14.81 km^{2} (5.72 sq mi)
- Elevation: 231 m (758 ft)

Population (2026-01-01)
  - Total: 3,824
  - Density: 258.2/km^{2} (668.7/sq mi)
- Time zone: UTC+1 (CET)
  - Summer (DST): UTC+2 (CEST)
- Postal code: 747 22
- Website: www.dolnibenesov.cz

Dolní Benešov (Czech pronunciation: [ˈdolɲiː ˈbɛnɛʃof]; formerly Benešov u Hlučína; German: Beneschau) is a town in Opava District in the Moravian-Silesian Region of the Czech Republic. It has about 3,800 inhabitants. It is part of the historical Hlučín Region.

== Administrative division ==
Dolní Benešov consists of two municipal parts (in brackets population according to the 2021 census):

- Dolní Benešov (3,194)
- Zábřeh (694)

== Geography ==
Dolní Benešov is located about 14 kilometres (9 mi) east of Opava and 12 km (7 mi) northwest of Ostrava. It lies in a flat agricultural landscape in the Opava Hilly Land. It is situated near the Opava River, which forms the southern municipal border. There are two large fishponds: Jezero and Nezmar.

== History ==
The first written mention of Benešov is from 1312, as an estate of the Benešovice noble family. In 1371, its then owner Margrave John Henry exchanged Benešov for the Drahotuš Castle near Lipník nad Bečvou with the Drahotuš family. This family owned Benešov until the late 16th century. During their rule, the village prospered and developed, and in 1493 it received town privileges by King Vladislaus II.

In 1598, Benešov was illegally acquired by the Mošovský family during their re-Catholicisation struggles. The town was then owned by the barons of Kalkreut in 1710–1774, by the Henneberk family in 1774–1846, and by the Rothschild family in 1846–1848.

During World War II, the village was the base for a working party of British and Commonwealth prisoners of war, under the administration of Stalag VIIIB/344 at Łambinowice in Poland. In January 1945, as the Soviet armies resumed their offensive and advanced from the east, and the prisoners were marched westward in The Long March. Many of them died from the bitter cold and exhaustion. The lucky ones got far enough to the west to be liberated by the Allied armies.

== Demographics ==
Historical population

Year	Pop.	±%
1869	2,240	—
1880	2,239	−0.0%
1890	2,310	+3.2%
1900	2,374	+2.8%
1910	2,438	+2.7%

Year	Pop.	±%
1921	2,524	+3.5%
1930	2,694	+6.7%
1950	2,610	−3.1%
1961	3,381	+29.5%
1970	3,694	+9.3%

Year	Pop.	±%
1980	4,111	+11.3%
1991	4,368	+6.3%
2001	4,370	+0.0%
2011	4,131	−5.5%
2021	3,888	−5.9%

Source: Censuses

== Transport ==
The I/56 road from Ostrava to Opava runs through the town.

Dolní Benešov is located on the railway line Opava–Hlučín.

== Culture ==
The annual meeting of youth wind orchestras Music Spring in the Hlučín Region takes place in the town.

== Sport ==
The local football club FC Dolní Benešov plays in lower amateur tiers.

Near the village of Zábřeh is a small sports airport.

== Sights ==
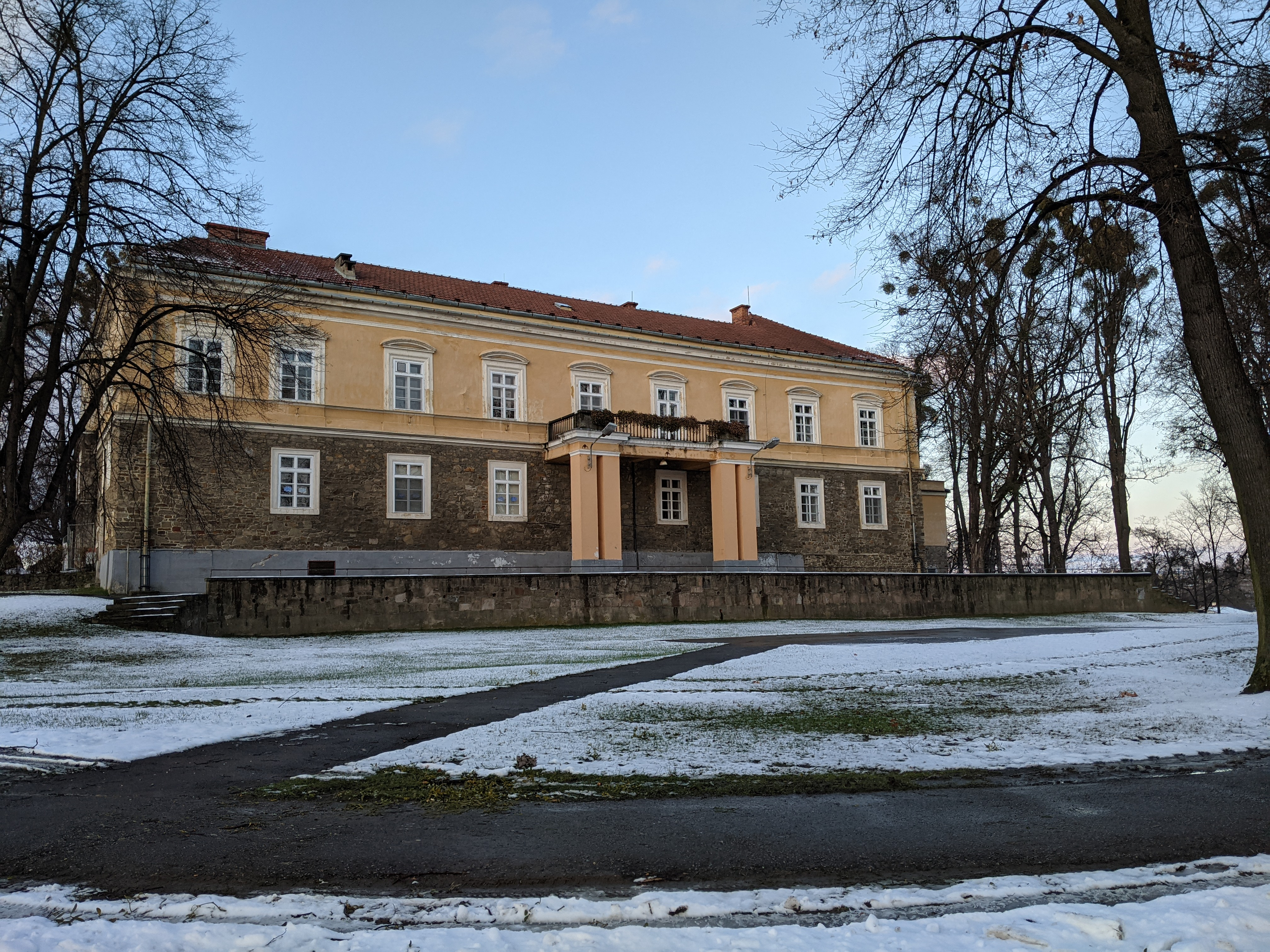
Dolní Benešov Castle

The local fortress from the 14th century was rebuilt into a Renaissance residence at the turn of the 16th and 17th centuries. In the 18th century, Baroque modifications were made. The last extensive reconstruction dates from the 1870s. Today the Dolní Benešov Castle houses the municipal office. The castle is surrounded by a 1.7 ha (4.2 acres) English park, which is freely accessible.

The Church of Saint Martin dates from the second half of the 17th century. The tower was added in 1862–1863.

== Twin towns – sister cities ==
Dolní Benešov is twinned with:

- Rajecké Teplice, Slovakia
- Wilamowice, Poland
