= Skidziń =

- Village
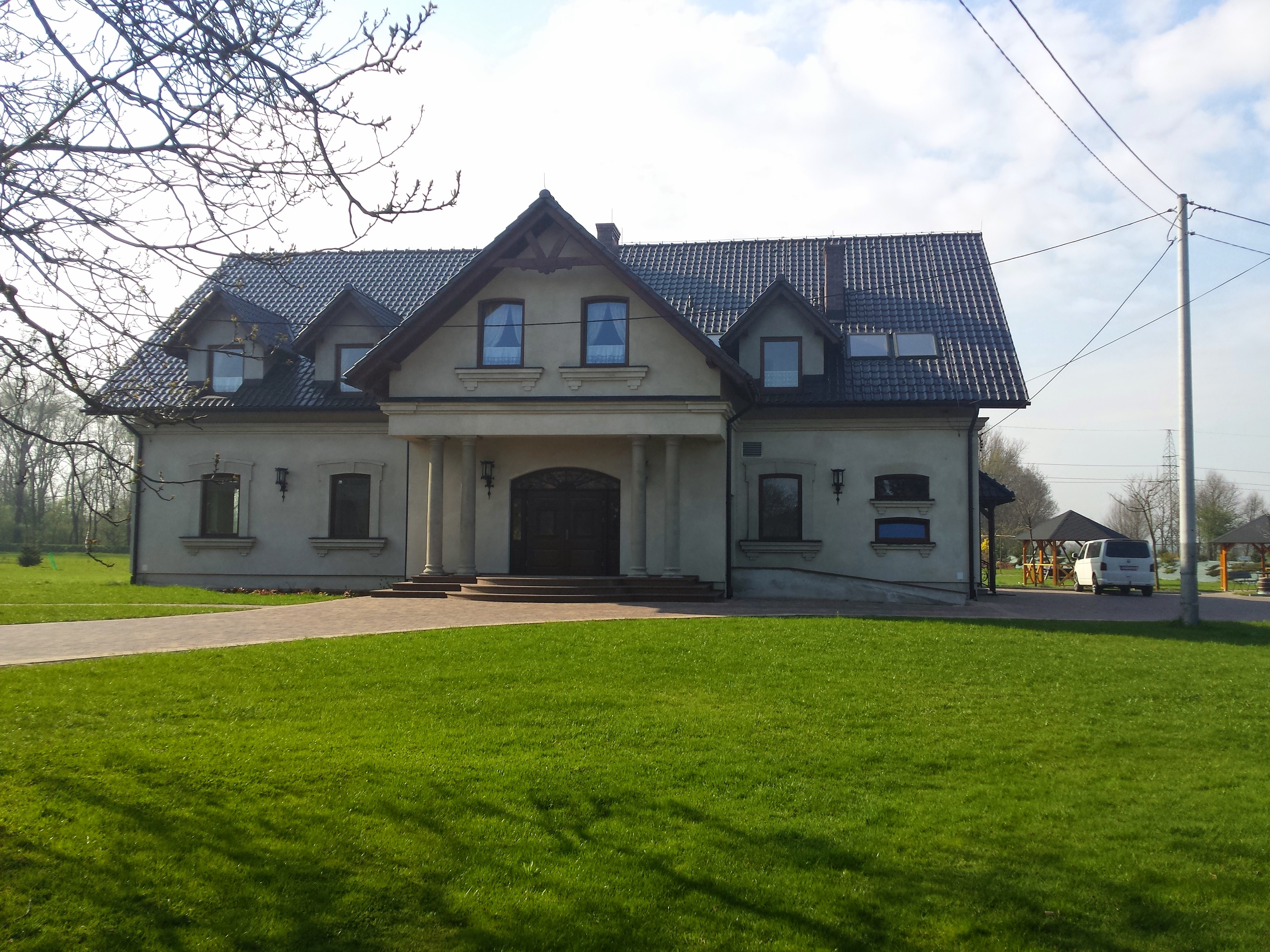

- Location within Poland
- Coordinates: 49°59′N 19°12′E
- Country: Poland
- Voivodeship: Lesser Poland
- County: Oświęcim
- Gmina: Brzeszcze
- Population: 750

Skidziń [ˈskid͡ʑiɲ] is a village in the administrative district of Gmina Brzeszcze, within Oświęcim County, Lesser Poland Voivodeship, in southern Poland.

== History ==
The village was first mentioned in 1454. It belonged then to the Duchy of Oświęcim, a fee of the Kingdom of Bohemia. In 1457, Jan IV of Oświęcim agreed to sell the duchy to the Polish Crown, and in the accompanying document issued on 21 February the village was mentioned as Skedzey.

The territory of the Duchy of Oświęcim was eventually incorporated into Poland in 1564 and formed Silesian County of Kraków Voivodeship. Upon the First Partition of Poland in 1772, it became part of the Austrian Kingdom of Galicia. After World War I and the fall of Austria-Hungary, it became part of Poland. It was annexed by Nazi Germany at the beginning of World War II, and afterwards it was restored to Poland.
