= Jawiszowice =

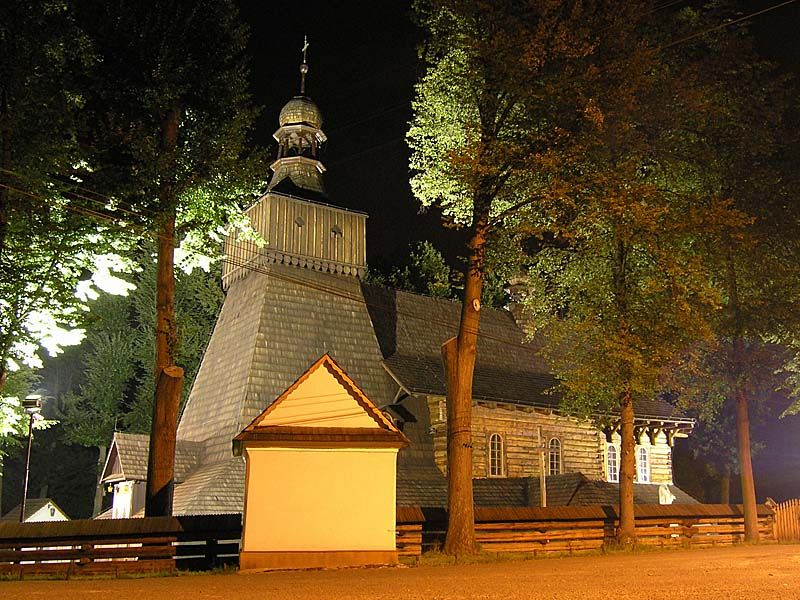
- Saint Martin Church

- Location within Poland
- Coordinates: 49°57′32″N 19°8′20″E
- Country: Poland
- Voivodeship: Lesser Poland
- County: Oświęcim
- Gmina: Brzeszcze
- First mentioned: 1326

Population (2006)
  - Total: 6,700
- Time zone: UTC+1 (CET)
  - Summer (DST): UTC+2 (CEST)
- Postal code: 32-626
- Area code: +48 32
- Car plates: KOS

Jawiszowice [javiʂɔˈvit͡sɛ] is a village in Oświęcim County, Lesser Poland Voivodeship in southern Poland. It has a long history of coal mining that continues to this day. Jawiszowice is about 12 kilometres from the city of Oświęcim.

== History ==
The village was first mentioned in 1326 in the register of Peter's Pence payment among Catholic parishes of Oświęcim deaconry of the Diocese of Kraków as Jan[w]issowicz.

Politically the village belonged then to the Duchy of Oświęcim, formed in 1315 in the process of feudal fragmentation of Poland and was ruled by a local branch of Piast dynasty. In 1327 the duchy became a fee of the Kingdom of Bohemia. In 1457 Jan IV of Oświęcim agreed to sell the duchy to the Polish Crown, and in the accompanying document issued on 21 February the village was mentioned as Jawyschowicze.

The territory of the Duchy of Oświęcim was eventually incorporated into Poland in 1564 and formed Silesian County of Kraków Voivodeship. In 1692 a wooden Saint Martin church was built here, nowadays an import landmark in the village.

Upon the First Partition of Poland in 1772 it became part of the Austrian Kingdom of Galicia. After World War I and fall of Austria-Hungary it became part of Poland. It was annexed by Nazi Germany at the beginning of World War II. It became the location of one of the Auschwitz sub-camps, named Jawischowitz. After the war it was restored to Poland.

== See also ==
- List of subcamps of Auschwitz
