= Zasole =

- Village
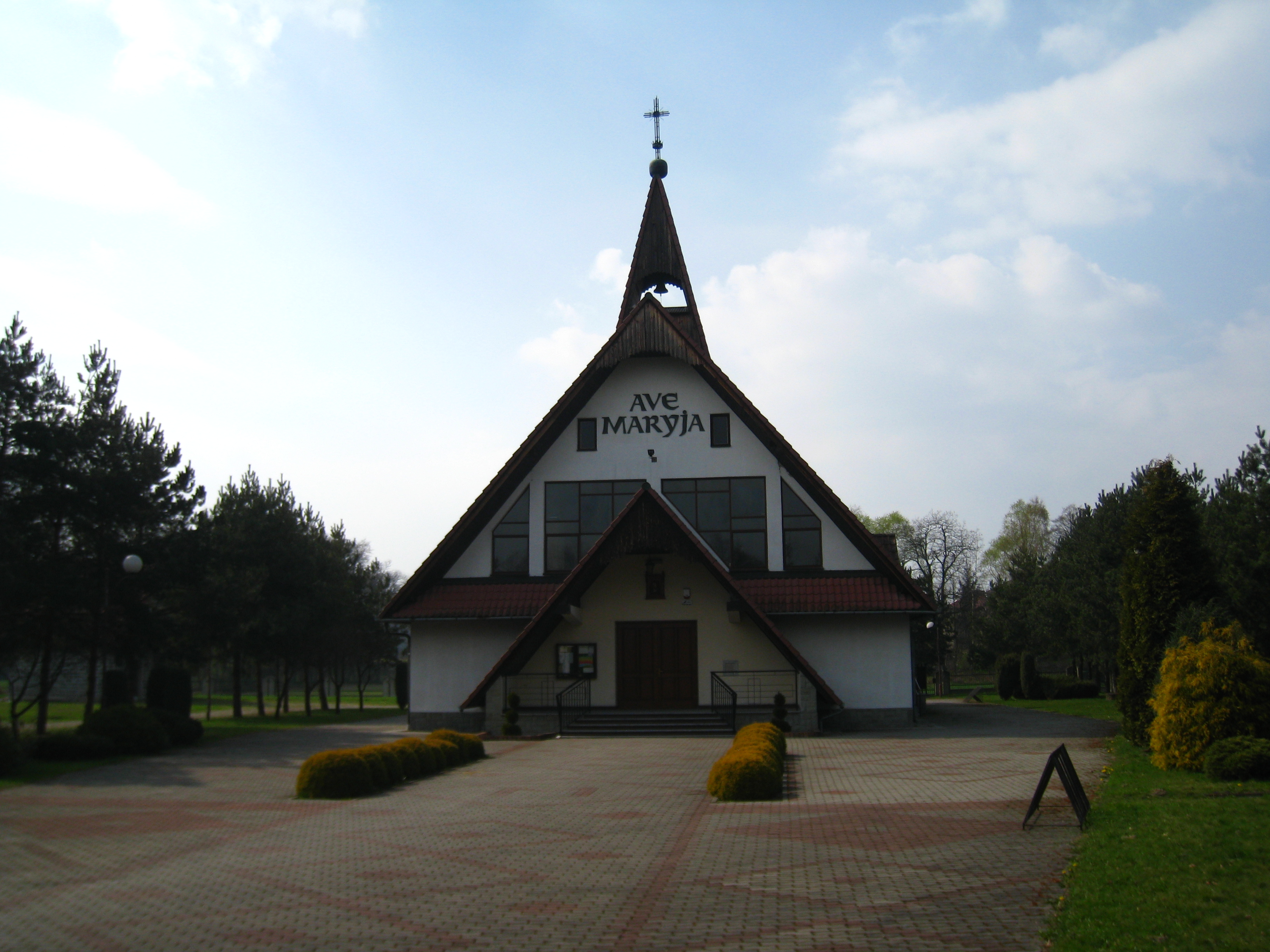

- Location within Poland
- Coordinates: 49°57′25″N 19°11′28″E
- Country: Poland
- Voivodeship: Lesser Poland
- County: Oświęcim
- Gmina: Brzeszcze
- Population: 800

Zasole [zaˈsɔlɛ] is a village in the administrative district of Gmina Brzeszcze, within Oświęcim County, Lesser Poland Voivodeship, in southern Poland.
