= Massacre in Budy =

1942 massacre of female Auschwitz prisoners

Coordinates: 50°00′22″N 19°09′26″E

- Part of Generalplan Ost and The Holocaust
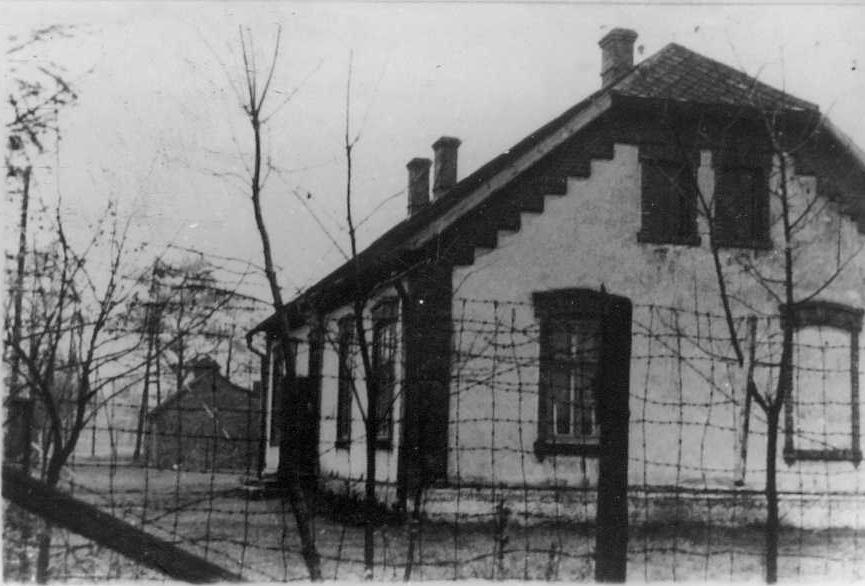
- The brick building - site of the massacre
- Location: Brzeszcze, German-occupied Poland
- Date: 5 October 1942
- Target: Subcamp female prisoners
- Attack type: Massacre
- Perpetrators: (Nazi Germany) SS-guards, German prisoner functionaries
- Motive: Nazi racist doctrines

The Massacre in Budy (German: Budyrevolte, Polish: Masakra w Budach) was the massacre of female prisoners from the penal company of Auschwitz concentration camp, who were quartered in the Wirtschaftshof Budy subcamp, which took place in the evening of 5 October 1942. Around 90 female prisoners, most of them French Jewish women, were killed by German prisoner functionaries and SS guards.

== The Subcamp ==
In April 1942, a subcamp of Auschwitz concentration camp was established in the areas of Bór, Budy, and Nazielence (now hamlets of the city of Brzeszcze). It was collectively named Wirtschaftshof Budy, after the local farm, and was later divided into separate male and female subcamps.

The women's subcamp was located in the Bór area. After the escape of a Polish prisoner, Janina Nowak, in June 1942, it was converted into a penal camp. The female prisoners held there were mainly tasked with cleaning nearby ponds, demolishing houses, and building roads. The prisoners were working under the surveillance of kapos and SS-men accompanied by dogs.

Half of the 400 prisoners were Polish women, while the others were Jewish women from Slovakia and France, as well as German women. The prisoner functionaries were German women, mostly prostitutes and criminals.

The subcamp (penal camp) consisted of three buildings. A brick building, previously used as a school, housed the German prisoner functionaries and SS-Aufseherin on the ground floor. French Jewish women were housed in the attic of the same building.

The remaining female prisoners: French Jewish, Polish, Russian, Ukrainian, Yugoslavian and Czech, lived in a windowless wooden barrack. The last building served as the camp kitchen. The subcamp area was surrounded by double barbed wire (not an electric fence), with guard towers placed at each of the four corners.

== Massacre ==
In the evening hours, a French Jewish prisoner was returning upstairs to the attic of the building shared with the German prisoner functionaries. One of the functionaries, a German prostitute named Elfriede Schmidt, claimed she saw a stone in the prisoner’s hand. She called for help from the SS guards, informing them that the prisoner had attacked her.

In his memoirs, SS man Pery Broad suggested that the real reason the prisoner functionary raised a false alarm was her desire to meet with her SS guard lover. Guards were not allowed inside the camp at night, but the alarm allowed them to enter, and the resulting chaos gave the lovers some time alone. Max Grabner, the head of the Politische Abteilung (the camp’s Gestapo), claimed that the massacre was driven by the functionaries' fear that the Jewish prisoners would report the forbidden sexual relations between the so-called "green" (criminal) prisoner functionaries and SS-men to the camp authorities. As a result, they decided to kill the Jewish prisoners.

After the alarm was raised, the SS guards, together with the prisoner functionaries, ran upstairs to the attic and began the massacre. The Jewish women were murdered using sticks, clubs, and axes. Some were pushed down the stairs, while others were thrown out of the windows. After the prisoners were driven outside, the massacre continued with rifle butts and gunshots. The number of victims is estimated at 90 people.

Camp commandant Rudolf Höß was informed about suppressing the alleged revolt at 5:00 in the morning.

== Aftermath ==
Alarmed by the situation, Höß personally went to the subcamp. After inspecting the site of the massacre, he returned to Auschwitz and handed the case over to the Political Department. After his departure, the SS guards remaining at Bór, in an effort to eliminate witnesses, attempted to kill all the prisoners who had survived the massacre by hiding among the corpses.

Before noon, additional SS officers (Erkennungsdienst: criminal intelligence service) arrived at Bór to document the event. They took photographs showing a pile of bodies and the corpses of prisoners hanging on the barbed wire fence — some of the Jewish women had made desperate attempts to escape, trying to climb the fence in a futile effort to save themselves. SS medics continued the process of eliminating witnesses by injecting the surviving French prisoners with phenol. The witnesses of the transfer of the bodies of the Budy massacre victims to the main camp were prisoners waiting to be accepted into the camp (October 6, 1942), transported from Ravensbrück.

The SS investigated the massacre. As a result, on October 24, 1942, six prisoner functionaries, including the so-called "Queen of the Axe", Elfriede Schmidt, were executed by lethal injection of phenol directly into the heart.

The original photographs taken immediately after the massacre were destroyed, and all remaining copies were handed over to the camp commandant. The camp documentation that would allow for the identification of victims by name has not been preserved.

Despite the massacre, the penal company continued to exist. It was not disbanded until March 1943.

== The Massacre in Rudolf Höss's memoirs ==
In his autobiography, the camp commandant expressed the following opinion about the massacre:

To this day, I still have the slaughter in Budy before my eyes. I do not believe that men would be capable of such brutality, of acting the way the green prisoner functionaries did, who murdered the French Jewish women; they tore them apart, killed them with axes, strangled them. It was horrific.

Although Höss described the course of events as a mutiny (Budyrevolte), in reality the massacre took a different course, as evidenced by both Broad's account and the fact that after the massacre the female functionary prisoners were murdered with phenol injections.

== Former subcamp's area today ==
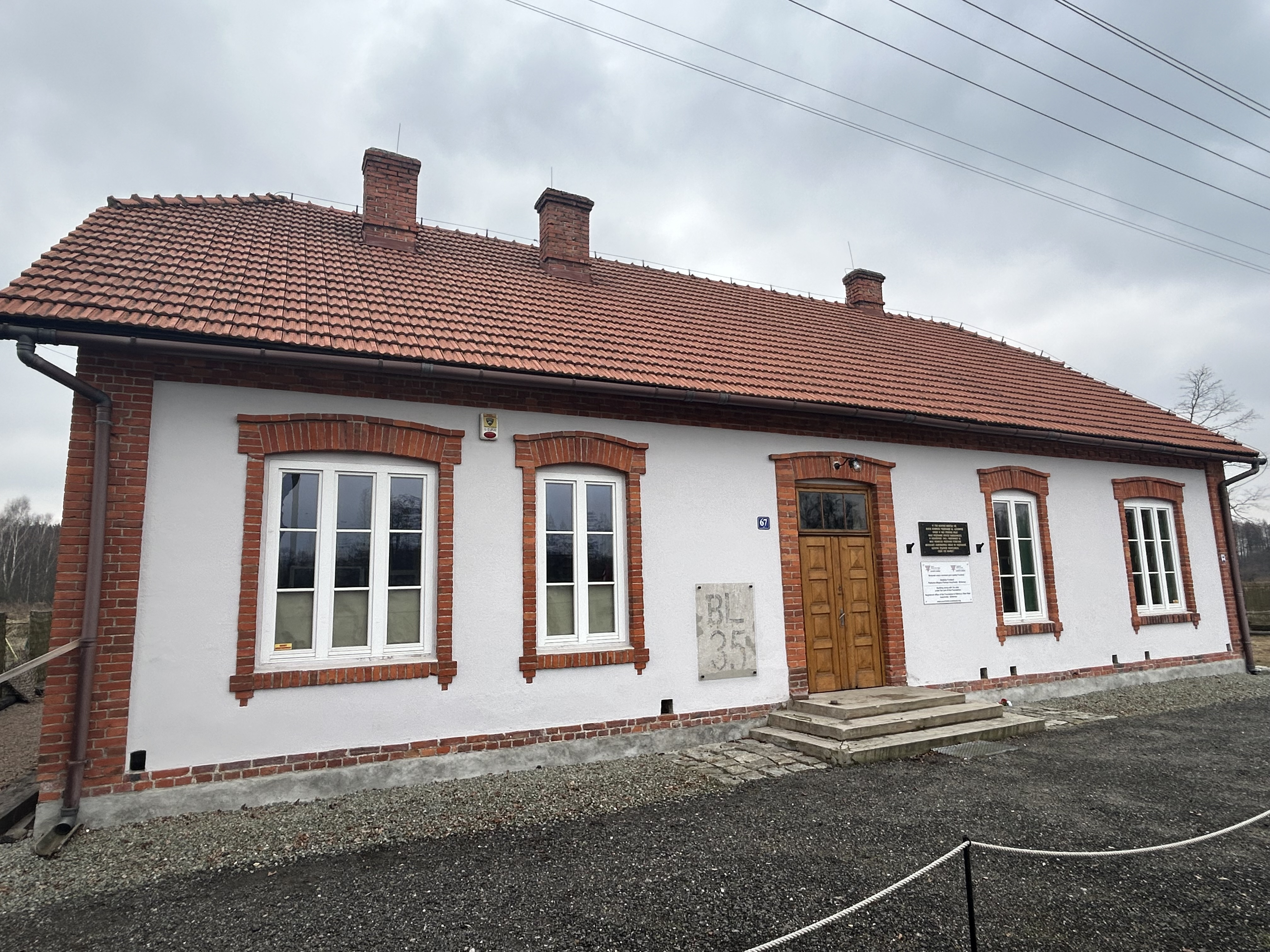
Former school building, as photographed in 2025

Only one building from the subcamp (the penal colony) has survived. The kitchen and the wooden barrack were demolished, while the former school building, where the massacre began, was converted into a kindergarten. The building changed its function after 2014, when it was transferred to the Foundation of Memory Sites Near Auschwitz-Birkenau. The Foundation runs exhibition and educational activities in the building.

Memorial plaques commemorating the subcamp, the penal company, and the massacre itself were placed on the building and in front of it.

== Bibliography ==
- Czech, Danuta (1992). Kalendarium wydarzeń w KL Auschwitz (in Polish). Oświęcim: Wydawnictwo PMO. ISBN 83-85047-04-2.
- Höß, Rudolf; Broad, Pery; Kremer, Johann Paul (1991). Oświęcim w oczach SS (in Polish). Warszawa: Wydawnictwo Interpress. ISBN 978-83-223-2472-1.
- Lachendro, Jacek (2009). Gmina Brzeszcze w latach okupacji niemieckiej 1939–1945. Przewodnik po wybranych miejscach pamięci (in Polish). Brzeszcze: Urząd Gminy Brzeszcze. ISBN 978-83-62119-00-4.
- Langbein, Hermann (2004). People in Auschwitz. Chapel Hill: University of North Carolina Press. ISBN 978-08-07828-16-8.
- Zięba, Anna (1967), Wirtschaftshof Budy [in: Zeszyty Oświęcimskie], Oświęcim: Wydawnictwo Państwowego Muzeum w Oświęcimiu
