= Przecieszyn =

- Village
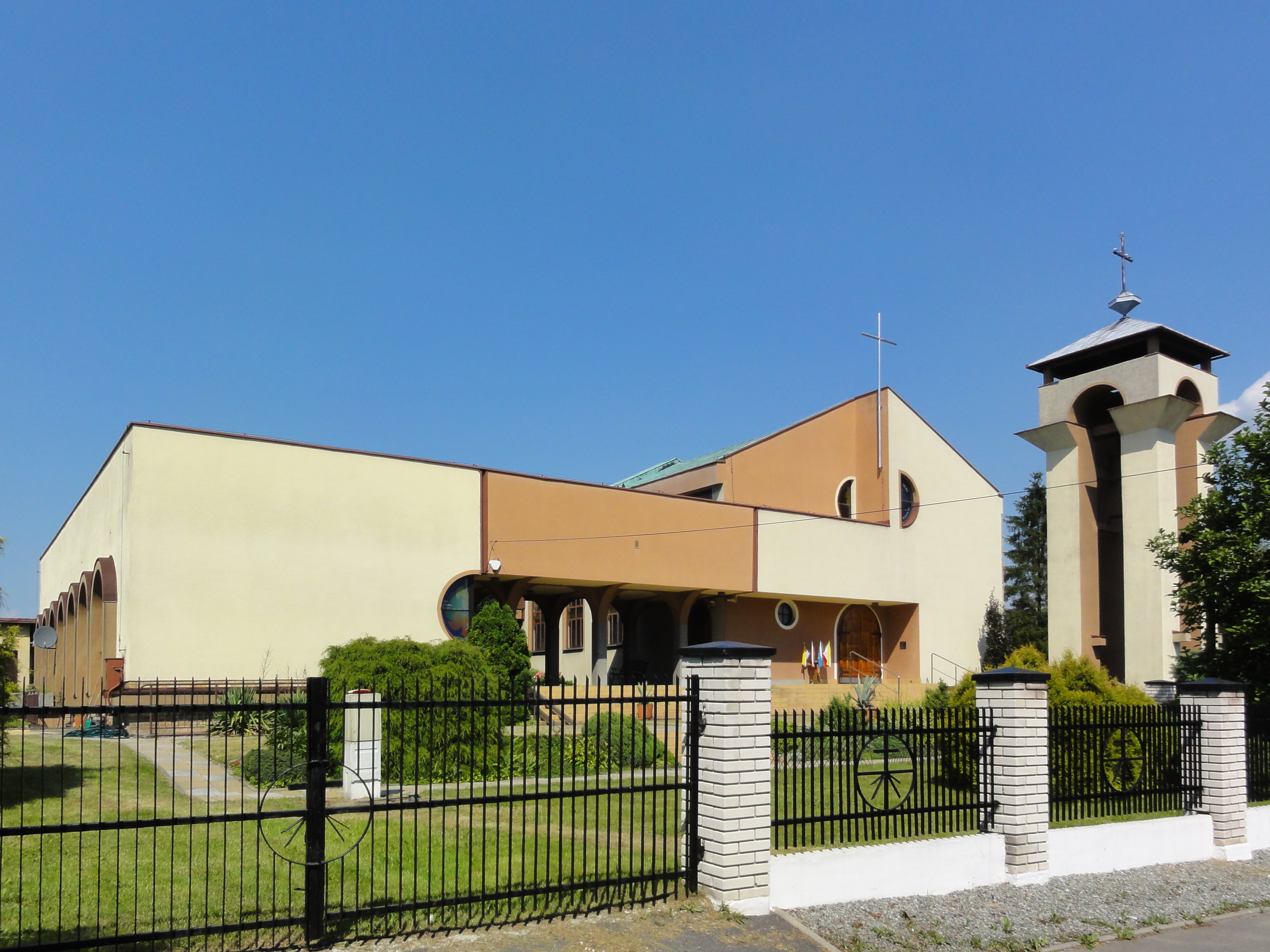
- Catholic church

- Location within Poland
- Coordinates: 49°58′N 19°11′E
- Country: Poland
- Voivodeship: Lesser Poland
- County: Oświęcim
- Gmina: Brzeszcze
- Population: 1,000

Przecieszyn [pʂɛˈt͡ɕɛʂɨn] is a village in the administrative district of Gmina Brzeszcze, within Oświęcim County, Lesser Poland Voivodeship, in southern Poland.

== History ==
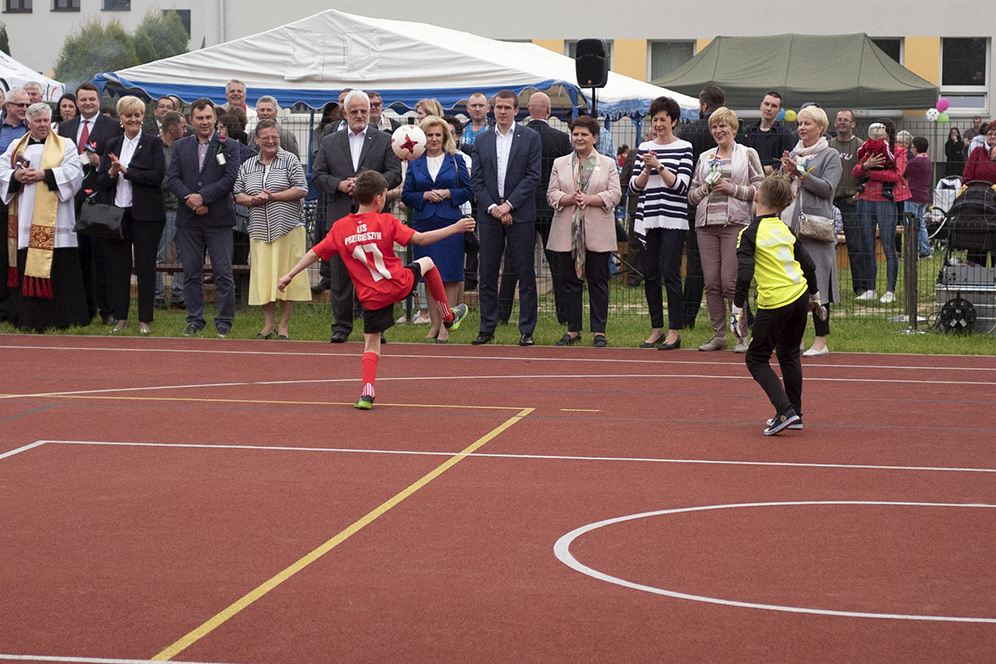
A sports field at Przecieszyn, 2017

In years 1441-1445 it was owned by Gothardus. Politically the village belonged then to the Duchy of Oświęcim, a fee of the Kingdom of Bohemia. In 1457 Jan IV of Oświęcim agreed to sell the duchy to the Polish Crown, and in the accompanying document issued on 21 February the village was mentioned as Przeceszyn.

The territory of the Duchy of Oświęcim was eventually incorporated into Poland in 1564 and formed Silesian County of Kraków Voivodeship. Upon the First Partition of Poland in 1772 it became part of the Austrian Kingdom of Galicia. After World War I and fall of Austria-Hungary it became part of Poland. It was annexed by Nazi Germany at the beginning of World War II, and afterwards it was restored to Poland.
