= Wilczkowice, Oświęcim County =

Wilczkowice
- Village
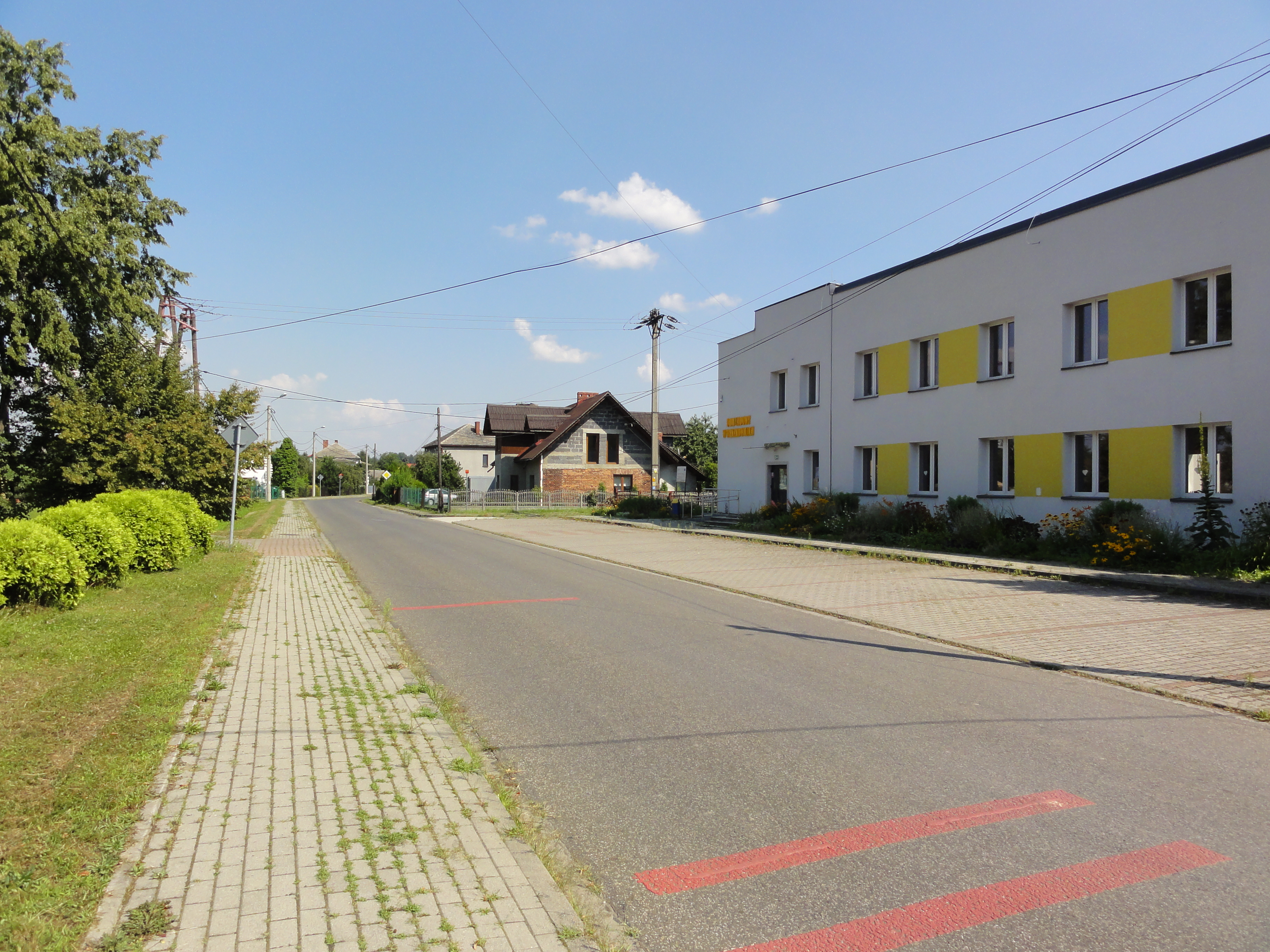

- Location within Poland
- Coordinates: 49°59′17″N 19°11′34″E
- Country: Poland
- Voivodeship: Lesser Poland
- County: Oświęcim
- Gmina: Brzeszcze
- First mentioned: 1457
- Population: 333

Wilczkowice [vilt͡ʂkɔˈvit͡sɛ] is a village in the administrative district of Gmina Brzeszcze, within Oświęcim County, Lesser Poland Voivodeship, in southern Poland.

== History ==
The village was first mentioned as Wylczkowicze in the document issued by Jan IV of Oświęcim on 21 February 1457 in which he agreed to sell the Duchy of Oświęcim to the Polish Crown.

The territory of the Duchy of Oświęcim was eventually incorporated into Poland in 1564 and formed Silesian County of Kraków Voivodeship. Upon the First Partition of Poland in 1772 it became part of the Austrian Kingdom of Galicia. After World War I and fall of Austria-Hungary it became part of Poland. It was annexed by Nazi Germany at the beginning of World War II, and afterwards it was restored to Poland.
