= Janina Coal Mine =

Coordinates: 50.0921°N 19.3320°E

Janina coal mine
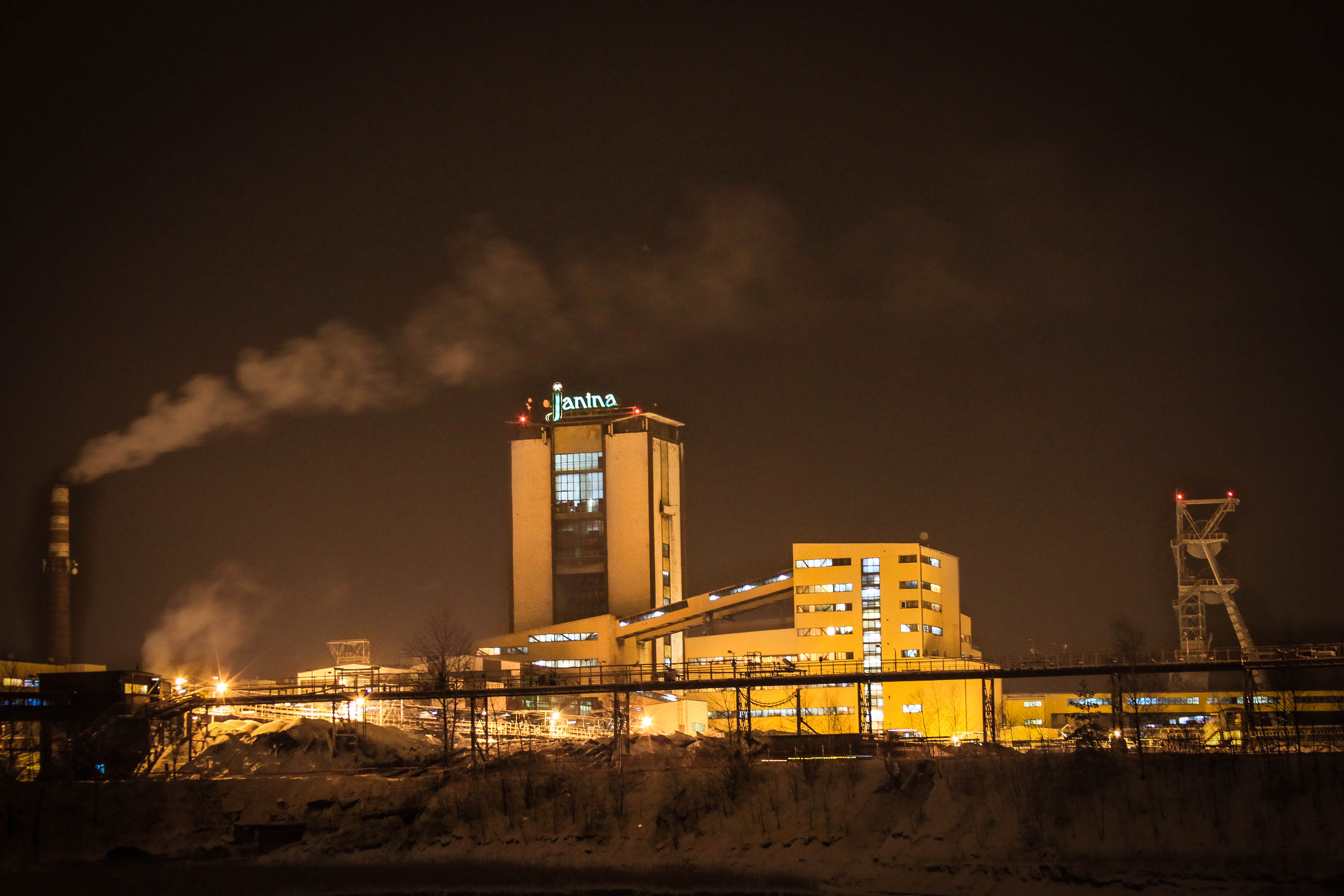
- Janina coal mine in 2013
- Interactive map of Janina coal mine
- Location: Libiąż, Lesser Poland Voivodeship, Poland
- Products: Coal
- Production: 2,800,000
- Opened: 1907
- Company: Tauron Group
- Website: Zakład Górniczy Janina

The Janina coal mine is a large mine in the south of Poland in Libiąż, Lesser Poland Voivodeship, 350 km south-west of the capital, Warsaw. The mine has been erected by Compagnie Galicienne de Mines, a French mining company, in 1907. Between 1921 and 1939 the Janina mine was under management of its Polish chief executive, Zygmunt Szczotkowski. During World War II it was repurposed into one of the German Nazi concentration camps. After the war the Janina mine was nationalizated, as all enterprises with over 50 employees had been at that time.

Janina represents one of the largest coal reserve in Poland having estimated reserves of 841 million tonnes of coal. The annual coal production is around 2.8 million tonnes.
