= Brzeszcze =

Town in Lesser Poland Voivodeship, Poland

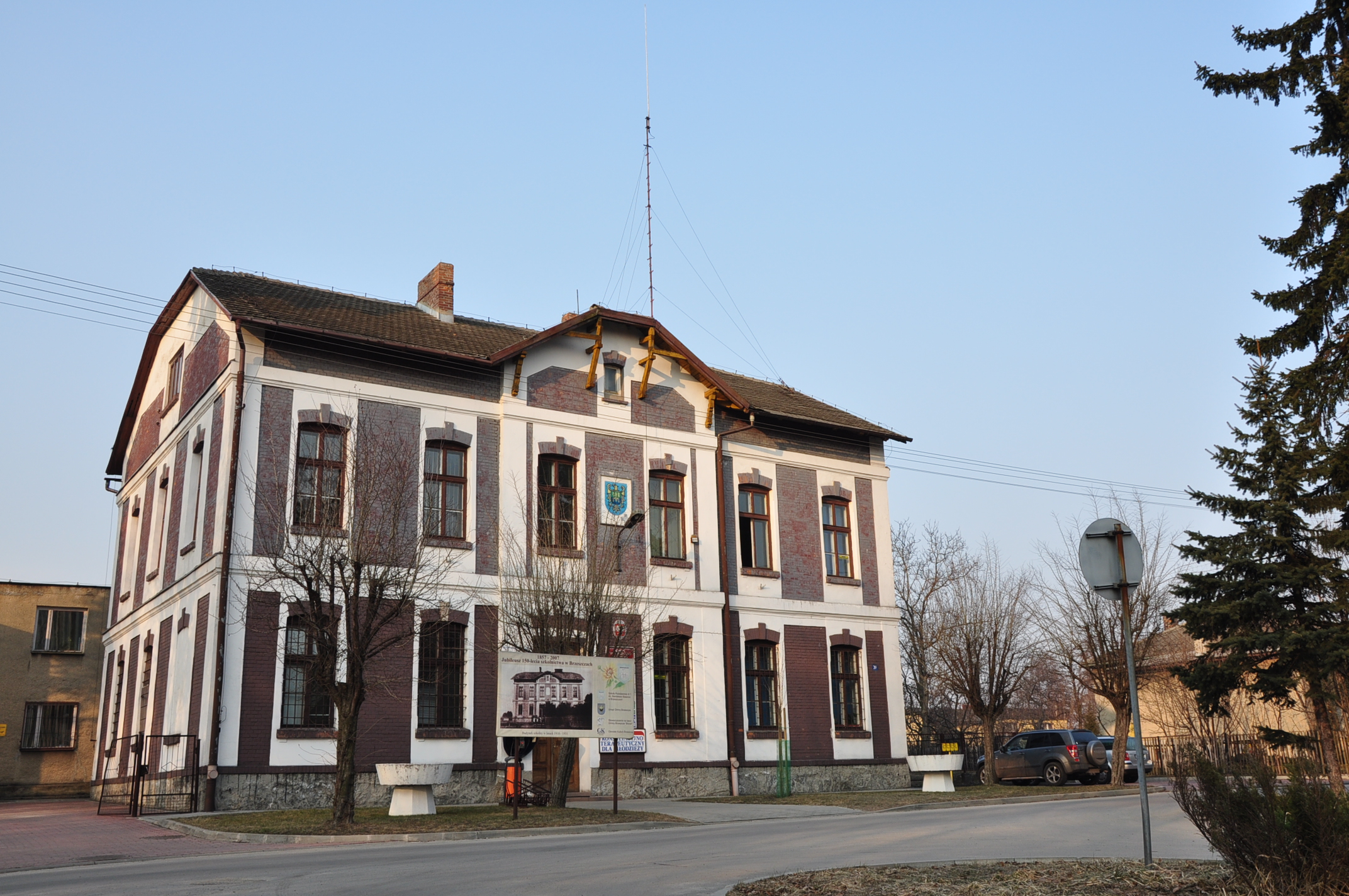
- Town Hall

- Coat of arms

- Location within Poland
- Coordinates: 49°58′55″N 19°08′50″E
- Country: Poland
- Voivodeship: Lesser Poland
- County: Oświęcim
- Gmina: Brzeszcze
- Established: 15th century
- Town rights: 1962

Government
  - Mayor: Radosław Szot

Area
  - Total: 19.17 km^{2} (7.40 sq mi)

Population (31 December 2021)
  - Total: 10,935
  - Density: 570.4/km^{2} (1,477/sq mi)
- Time zone: UTC+1 (CET)
  - Summer (DST): UTC+2 (CEST)
- Postal code: 32–620
- Area code: +48 32
- Car plates: KOS
- Website: http://www.brzeszcze.pl

Brzeszcze [ˈbʐɛʂt͡ʂɛ] is a town in Oświęcim County, Lesser Poland Voivodeship in southern Poland, near Oświęcim. As of December 2021, the town has a population of 10,935.

== Location ==
Brzeszcze lies in the Northern Carpathian Foothills, on the Vistula river, in western Lesser Poland. The town is part of the Upper Silesian Coal Basin. The distance to Kraków is 79 kilometers (49 miles), and the distance to Czech border crossing at Cieszyn, 50 km (31 mi). The town has three rail stations – Brzeszcze, Brzeszcze-Kopalnia, and Brzeszcze-Jawiszowice. All three are located along rail line nr. 93, which goes from Trzebinia to Zebrzydowice. Brzeszcze lies along regional roads nr. 933 and nr. 949.

== Etymology ==
The name comes from the brzost (Ulmus glabra) trees, which once were abundant in the Sola river valley. In the past the town was spelled Brzescie, Breszcze, Brescze, Brzeszce, and Brzesczye.

== History ==
The history of the town dates back to the 15th century, and it was probably founded by Flemish settlers. First documented mention of Brzeszcze comes from 1438, when the village was part of the Duchy of Oświęcim, a fee of the Kingdom of Bohemia. In 1457 Jan IV of Oświęcim agreed to sell the duchy to the Kingdom of Poland, and in the accompanying document issued on 21 February the village was mentioned as Brzescze. The territory of the Duchy of Oświęcim was eventually incorporated into Poland in 1564 and formed Silesian County in the Kraków Voivodeship in the Lesser Poland Province.

For centuries Brzeszcze remained a small, private village, which belonged to Polish kings, who leased it to members of the nobility. The inhabitants were mainly fishermen and farmers, and among others, Brzeszcze was owned by Dominik Gherri, the physician of King Stanisław August Poniatowski. Like almost all towns and villages of Lesser Poland, Brzeszcze was completely destroyed during the Swedish invasion of Poland (1655–1660).

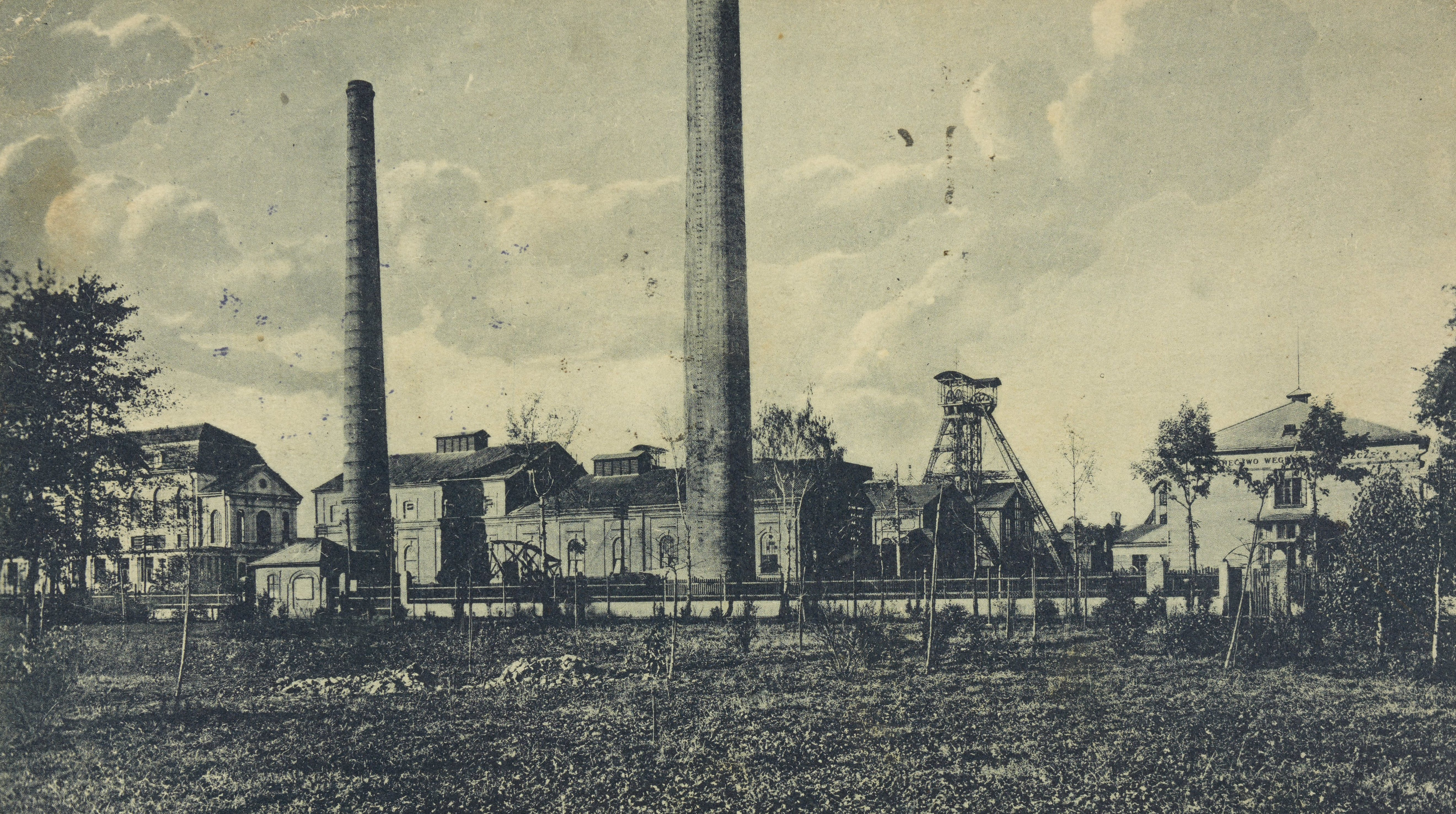
Coal mine in 1935

Following the First Partition of Poland, the village was annexed by the Habsburg Empire, and from 1772 until 1918 it was part of the province of Galicia. In 1900, there were some 220 houses at Brzeszcze, with a population of 1,400. Almost all residents were ethnic Poles and Roman Catholics. Brzeszcze grew because of the anthracite coal mine, which was founded in 1907. New housing districts for miners were built, the population quickly grew, and in the Second Polish Republic, Brzeszcze was one of main industrial villages of Kraków Voivodeship.

During World War II, the town was a stronghold of the Polish resistance, helping the prisoners of Auschwitz concentration camp. Prisoners of Auschwitz were also housed in a sub-camp, called Jawischowitz, near the mine where they labored. Numerous prisoners were killed through slave labor by the German civilian mine authorities, and by the SS. German authorities changed its name into Kohlendorf.

After the war the village continued its development, and in July 1962 was granted town charter.

== Economy ==
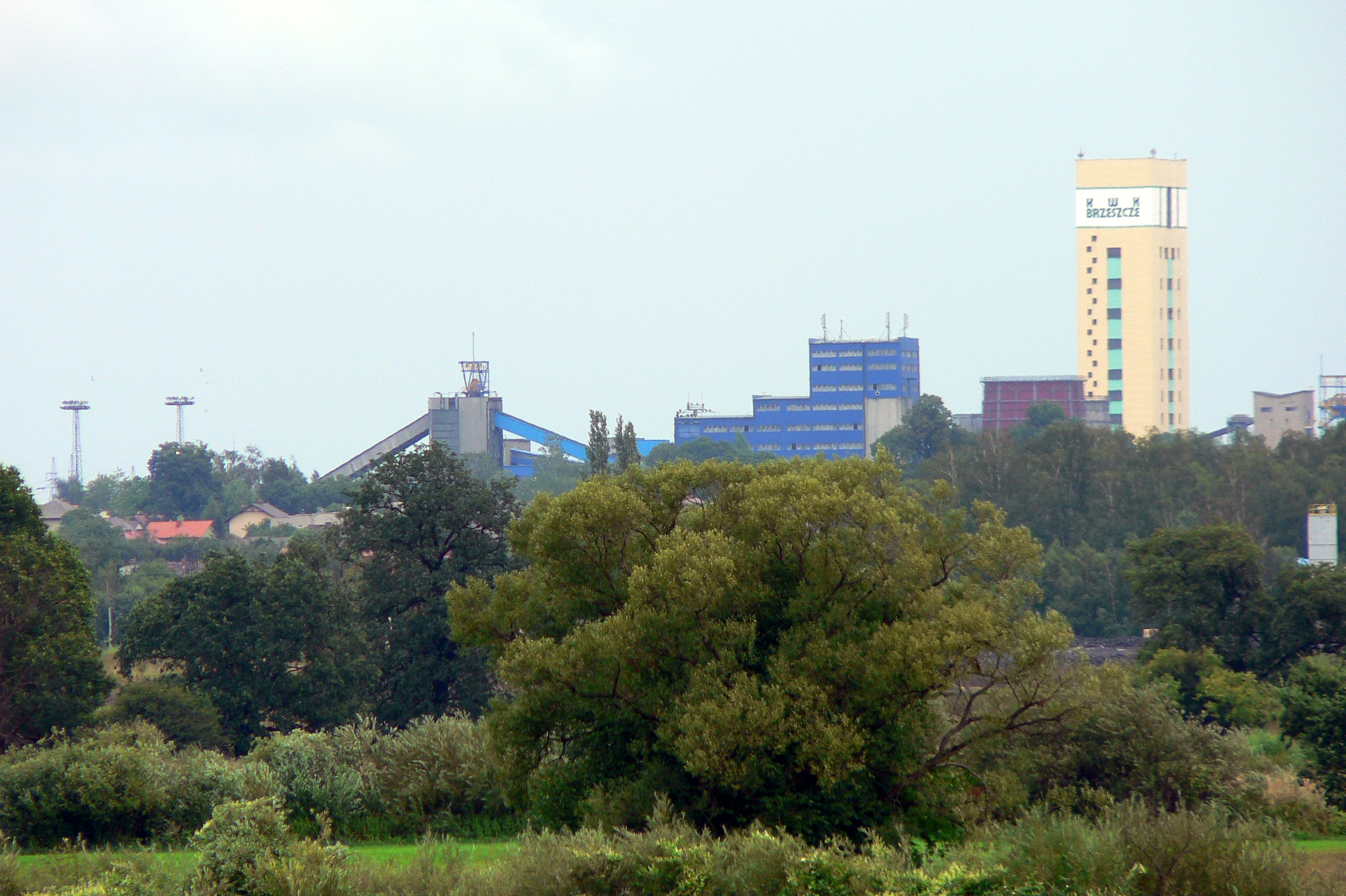
Anthracite Coal mine "Brzeszcze-Silesia"

The economy of the town focuses on an anthracite coal mine "Brzeszcze-Silesia" which is the biggest employer in the region, and one of the biggest in the entire Voivodeship. In the Second Polish Republic, it was the only large coal mine which belonged to the Polish state. During the war, the mine was part of the Reichswerke Hermann Göring conglomerate, and inmates of Jawischowitz were employed in it.

== Sights ==
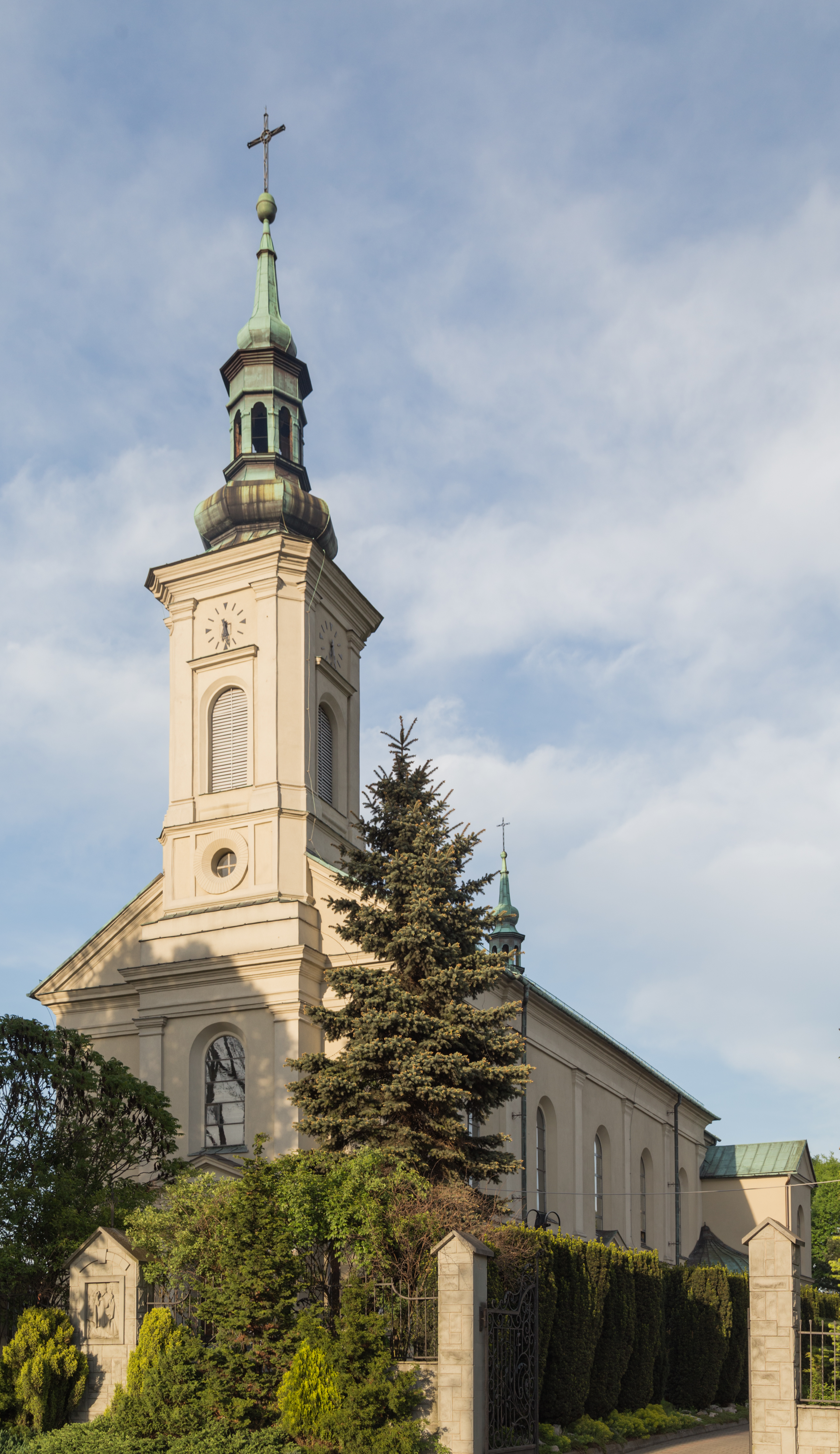
Saint Urban church

Most important point of interest is a 19th-century Roman Catholic parish church of St. Urban. Its construction was initiated in 1874, and lasted 30 years, mostly due to financial difficulties. Apart from the church, Brzeszcze has an 18th-century Austrian boundary marker, several 19th-century roadside chapels, and foundations of a 16th-century church, which was burned by the Swedish invaders in 1655.

== Sports ==
- Górnik Brzeszcze – The club was founded in 1922 by the Polish refugees from Trans-Olza in Czechoslovakia. The "Brzeszcze" mine used to be its main sponsor, and club's original name was “Strzała”.

== Notable people ==
- Arkadiusz Skrzypaszek, modern pentathlete and Olympic gold medalist
- Włodzimierz Lubański, footballer
- Beata Szydło, politician, Prime Minister
