= Světlá =

- Municipality
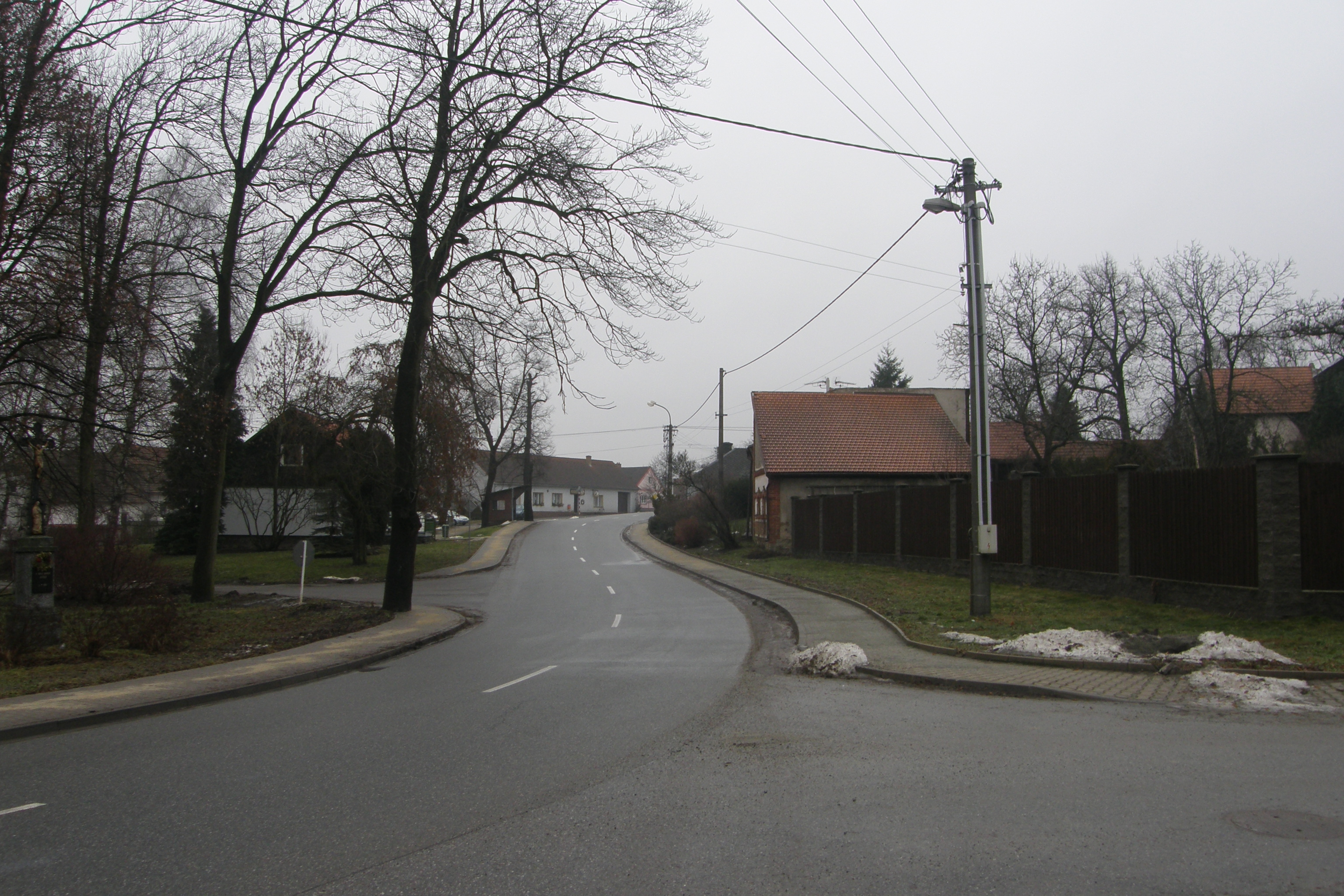
- Main street

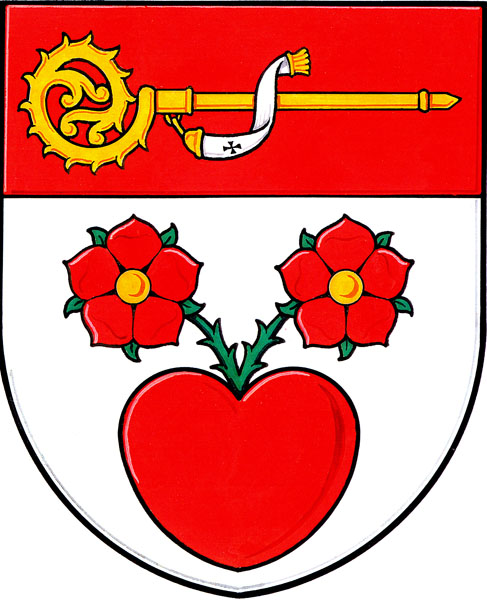
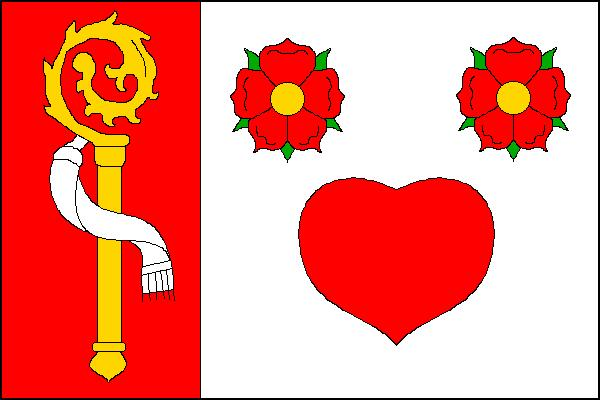
- Flag Coat of arms

- Location in the Czech Republic
- Coordinates: 49°33′57″N 16°43′6″E
- Country: Czech Republic
- Region: South Moravian
- District: Blansko
- First mentioned: 1321

Area
  - Total: 2.23 km^{2} (0.86 sq mi)
- Elevation: 431 m (1,414 ft)

Population (2026-01-01)
  - Total: 256
  - Density: 115/km^{2} (297/sq mi)
- Time zone: UTC+1 (CET)
  - Summer (DST): UTC+2 (CEST)
- Postal code: 679 63
- Website: www.obecsvetla.cz

Světlá is a municipality and village in Blansko District in the South Moravian Region of the Czech Republic. It has about 300 inhabitants.

== Geography ==
Světlá is located about 23 kilometres (14 mi) north of Blansko and 40 km (25 mi) north of Brno. It lies mostly in the Boskovice Furrow. A small eastern part of the municipality extends into the Drahany Highlands and includes the highest point of Světlá at 495 m (1,624 ft) above sea level. The stream Uhřický potok originates here and flows across the village.

== History ==
The first written mention of Světlá is from 1321. The village was probably founded around 1250 by Abbot Robert from the Hradisko Monastery. The monastery owned Světlá (as part of the Šebetov estate) until the abolition of the monastery in 1784. From 1784 to 1825, the estate was managed by the Religious Fund. After 1825, various noblemen have taken turns owning the estate.

After 1781, the hamlet of Přívěst was founded east of Světlá. In 1848, when independent municipalities were established, Světlá and Přívěst were merged into one municipality. Today they form an indivisible urban unit.

== Demographics ==
Historical population

Year	Pop.	±%
1869	329	—
1880	332	+0.9%
1890	346	+4.2%
1900	358	+3.5%
1910	352	−1.7%

Year	Pop.	±%
1921	344	−2.3%
1930	350	+1.7%
1950	267	−23.7%
1961	204	−23.6%
1970	236	+15.7%

Year	Pop.	±%
1980	218	−7.6%
1991	212	−2.8%
2001	195	−8.0%
2011	222	+13.8%
2021	235	+5.9%

Source: Censuses

== Transport ==
There are no major roads passing through Světlá. The railway that runs through the municipality is unused.

== Sights ==
There are no protected cultural monuments in the municipality.
