= Stara Wieś, Silesian Voivodeship =

Stara Wieś Wymysdiüf
- Village
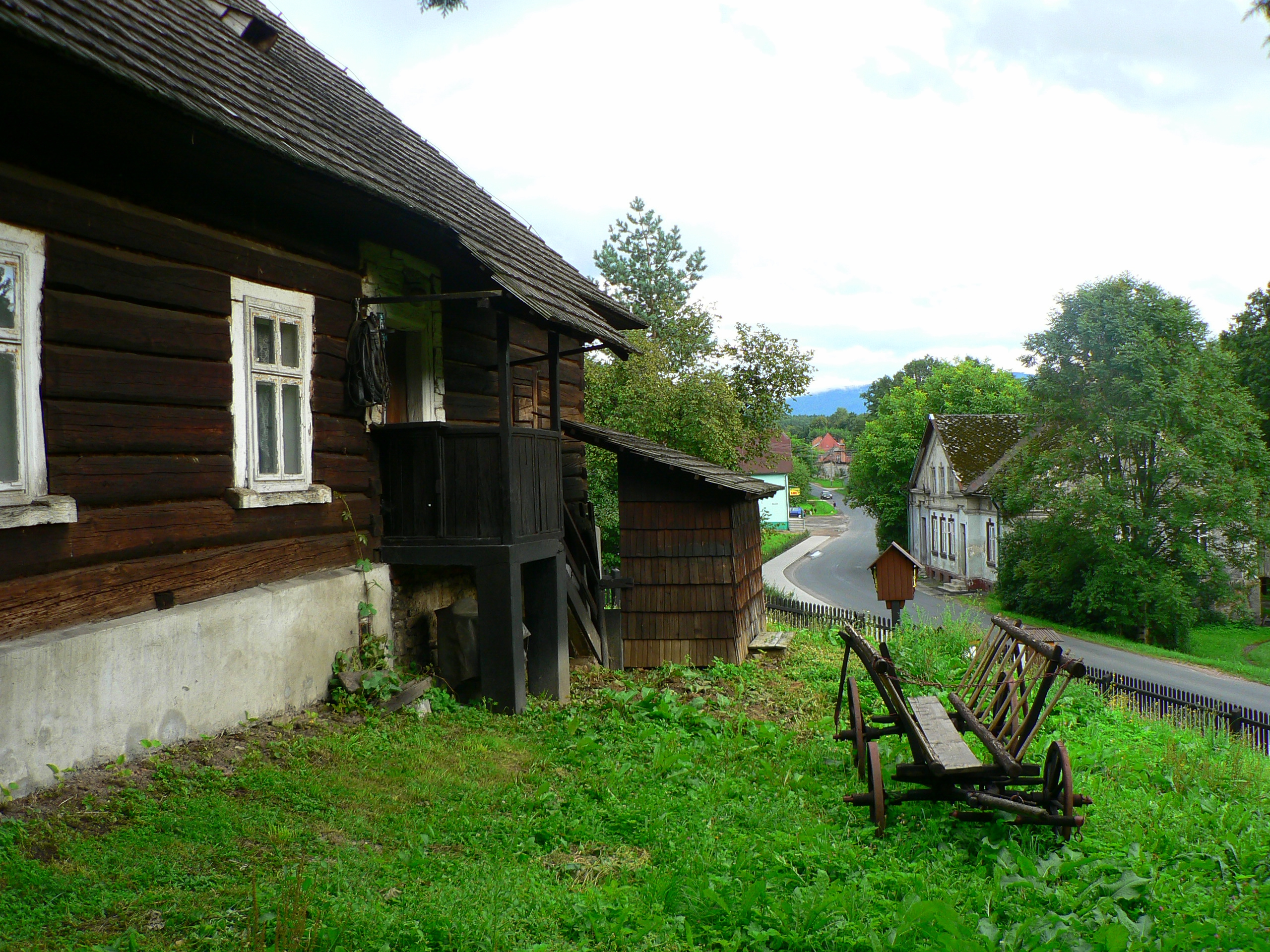
- An 18th-century parish school house in Stara Wieś

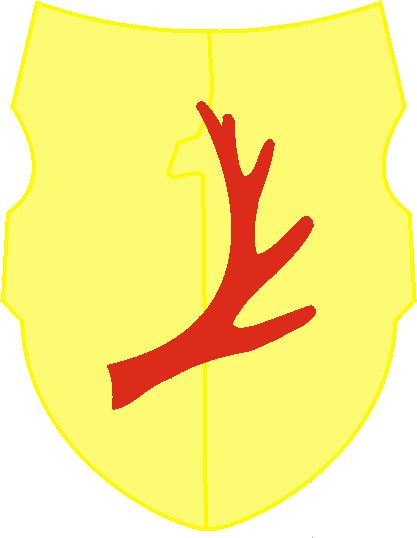
- Coat of arms

- Location within Poland
- Coordinates: 49°54′N 19°5′E
- Country: Poland
- Voivodeship: Silesian
- County: Bielsko
- Gmina: Wilamowice
- Population: 1,978
- Website: starawies.ovh.org

Stara Wieś (Polish pronunciation: [ˈstara vʲɛɕ], lit. 'Old Village'; Wymysorys: Wymysdiüf; Silesian: Staro Wieś) is a village in the administrative district of Gmina Wilamowice, within Bielsko County, Silesian Voivodeship, in southern Poland.

== History ==
According to the tradition Stara Wieś was established after the First Mongol invasion of Poland by settlers from Flanders, Friesland, Holland and Scotland. Soon after they moved on to found another sister settlement, contemporary Wilamowice, which was first mentioned in 1326 in the register of Peter's Pence payment among Catholic parishes of Oświęcim deanery of the Diocese of Kraków as Novovillamowicz, whereas Stara Wieś was mentioned as Antiquo Willamowicz. In 1444 it came to be known under current name Stara Wieś (German: Altdorf, Wymysorys: Vilmesdur).

Politically both villages belonged to the Duchy of Opole and Racibórz and the Castellany of Oświęcim, which was in 1315 formed in the process of feudal fragmentation of Poland into the Duchy of Oświęcim, ruled by a local branch of Silesian Piast dynasty. In 1327 the duchy became a fee of the Kingdom of Bohemia. In 1457 Jan IV of Oświęcim agreed to sell the duchy to the Polish Crown, and in the accompanying document issued on 21 February the village was mentioned as Stara Wyesz.

The territory of the Duchy of Oświęcim was eventually incorporated into Poland in 1564 and formed Silesian County of Kraków Voivodeship. Upon the First Partition of Poland in 1772 it became part of the Austrian Kingdom of Galicia. After World War I and fall of Austria-Hungary it became part of Poland. It was annexed by Nazi Germany at the beginning of World War II, and afterwards it was restored to Poland.

== Landmarks ==
There is a wooden Exaltation of the Holy Cross church from the early 16th century, registered as a cultural heritage monument. Another heritage monument lies nearby, a former parish school which now serves as Regional Room.

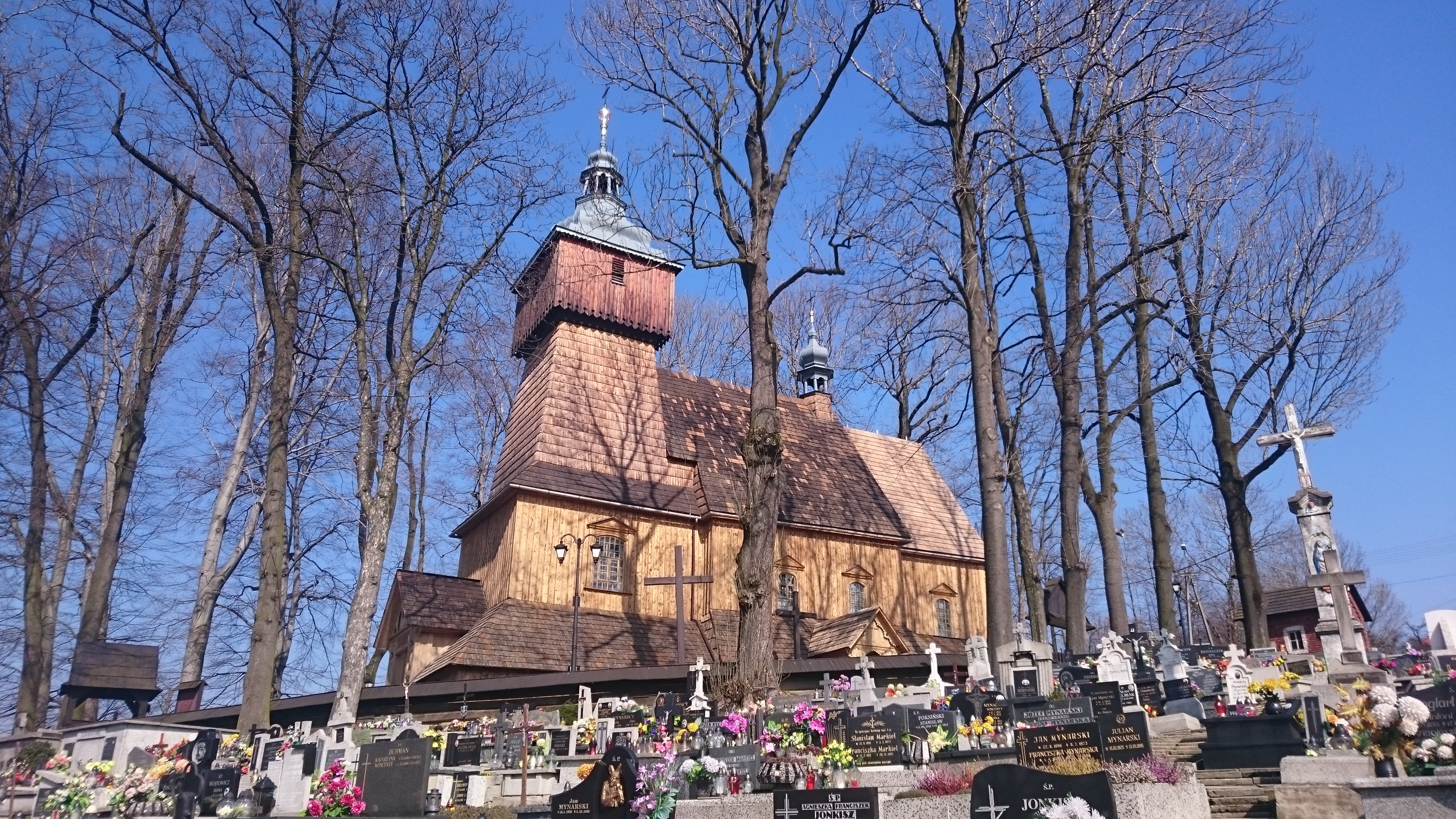
Exaltation of the Holy Cross church

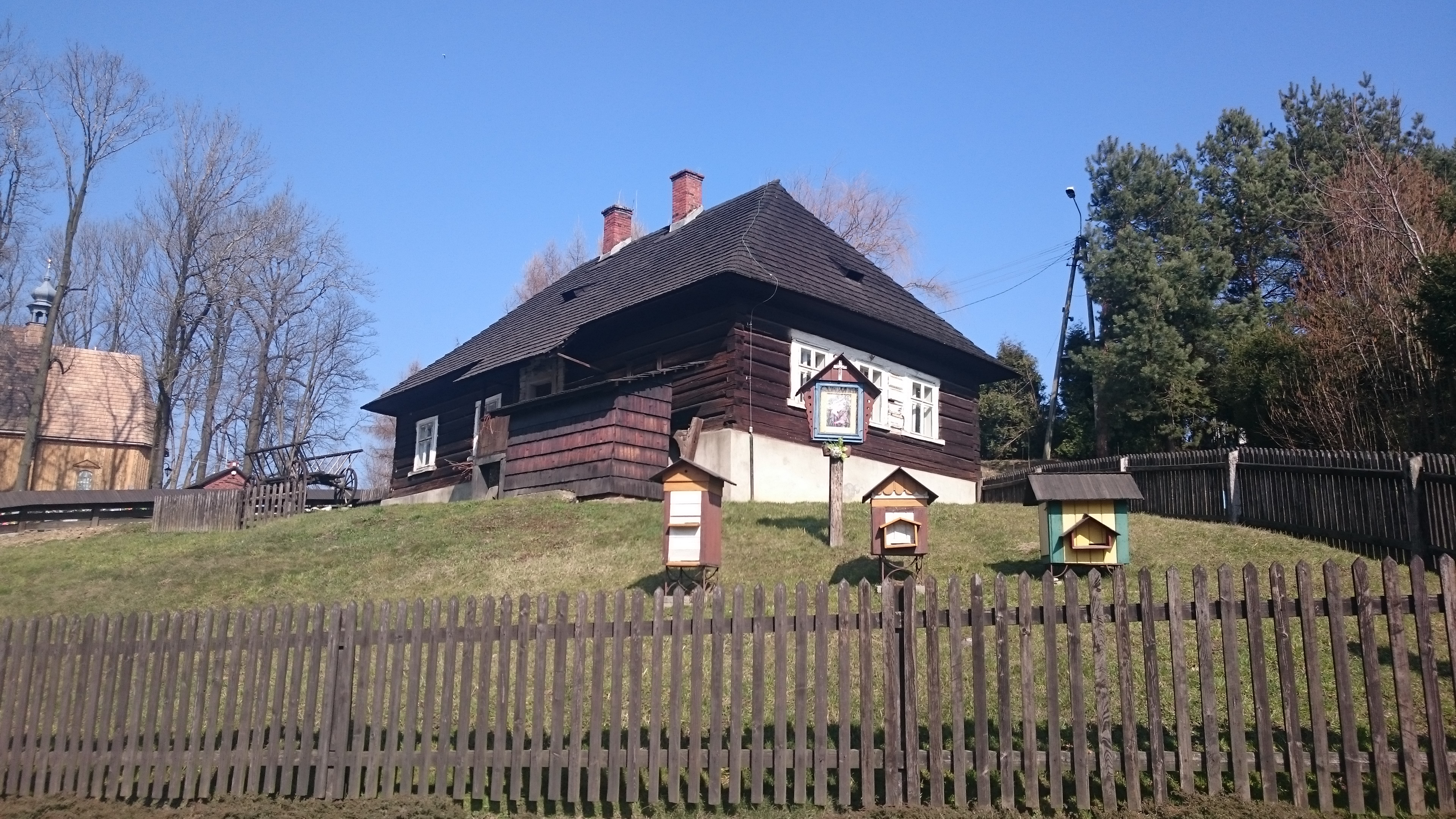
Regional Room

== People ==
- Kazimierz Nycz (b. 1950), Roman Catholic bishop
