= Libiąż =

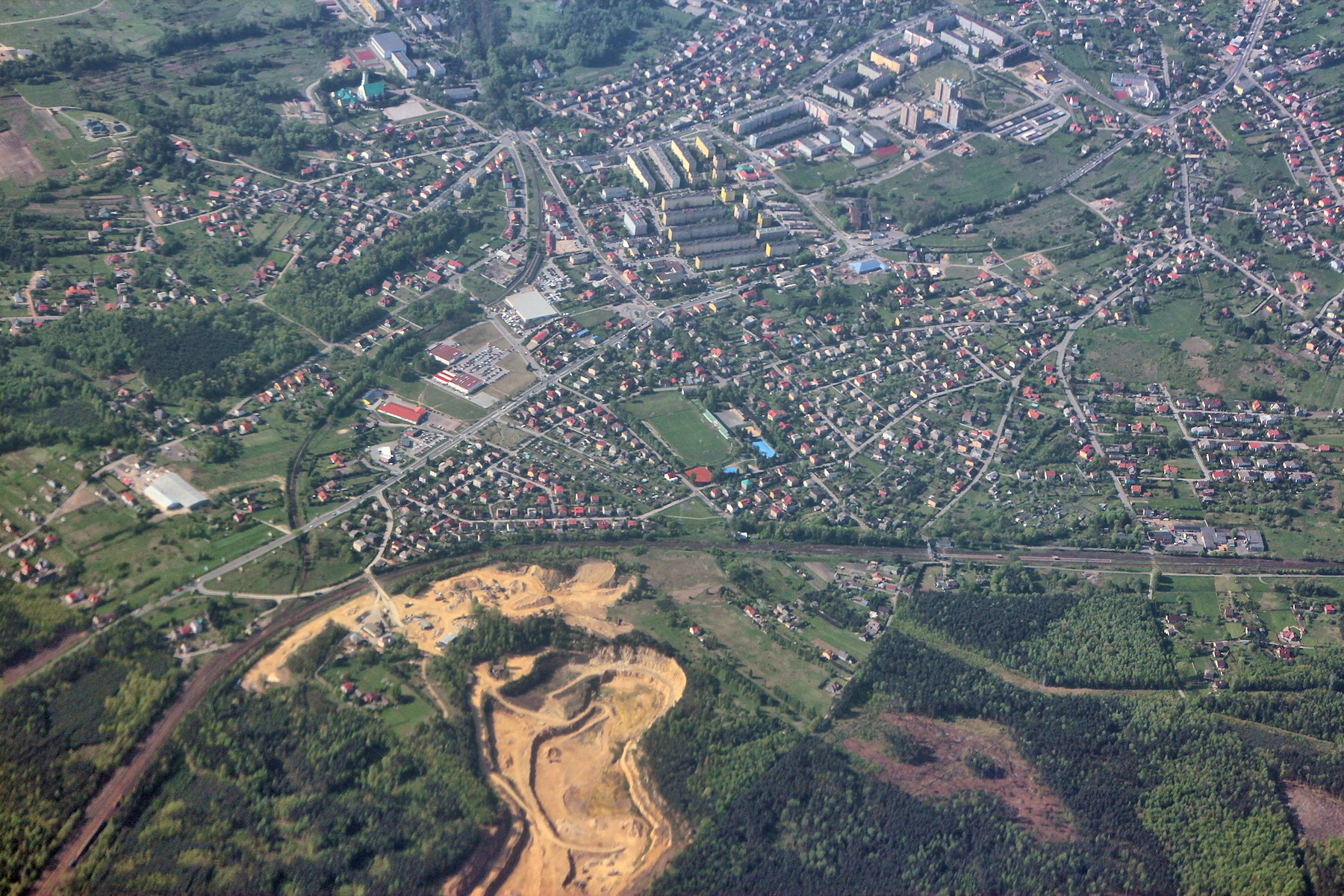
- Aerial view

- Coat of arms

- Location within Poland
- Coordinates: 50°6′N 19°19′E
- Country: Poland
- Voivodeship: Lesser Poland
- County: Chrzanów
- Gmina: Libiąż

Government
  - Mayor: Jacek Latko

Area
  - Total: 35.88 km^{2} (13.85 sq mi)

Population (2006)
  - Total: 17,604
  - Density: 490.6/km^{2} (1,271/sq mi)
- Time zone: UTC+1 (CET)
  - Summer (DST): UTC+2 (CEST)
- Postal code: 32-590
- Car plates: KCH
- Website: http://www.libiaz.pl

Libiąż [ˈlʲibʲɔ̃ʂ] is a town in Chrzanów County, Lesser Poland Voivodeship, Poland, with 17,671 inhabitants (2004).

== Location ==
Libiąż is located in the eastern part of the Upper Silesian Industrial District. It belongs to the Upper Silesian conurbation, among others, according to the program ESPON. Residents are employed in the central conurbation centers, including in Katowice and Tychy.

Geographically, the city lies on the eastern part of the Silesian Upland, on stromal Pagórach Libiąskich parts Pagórów Jaworzno. The territory of the city is covered by the exploitation of coal.

== History ==
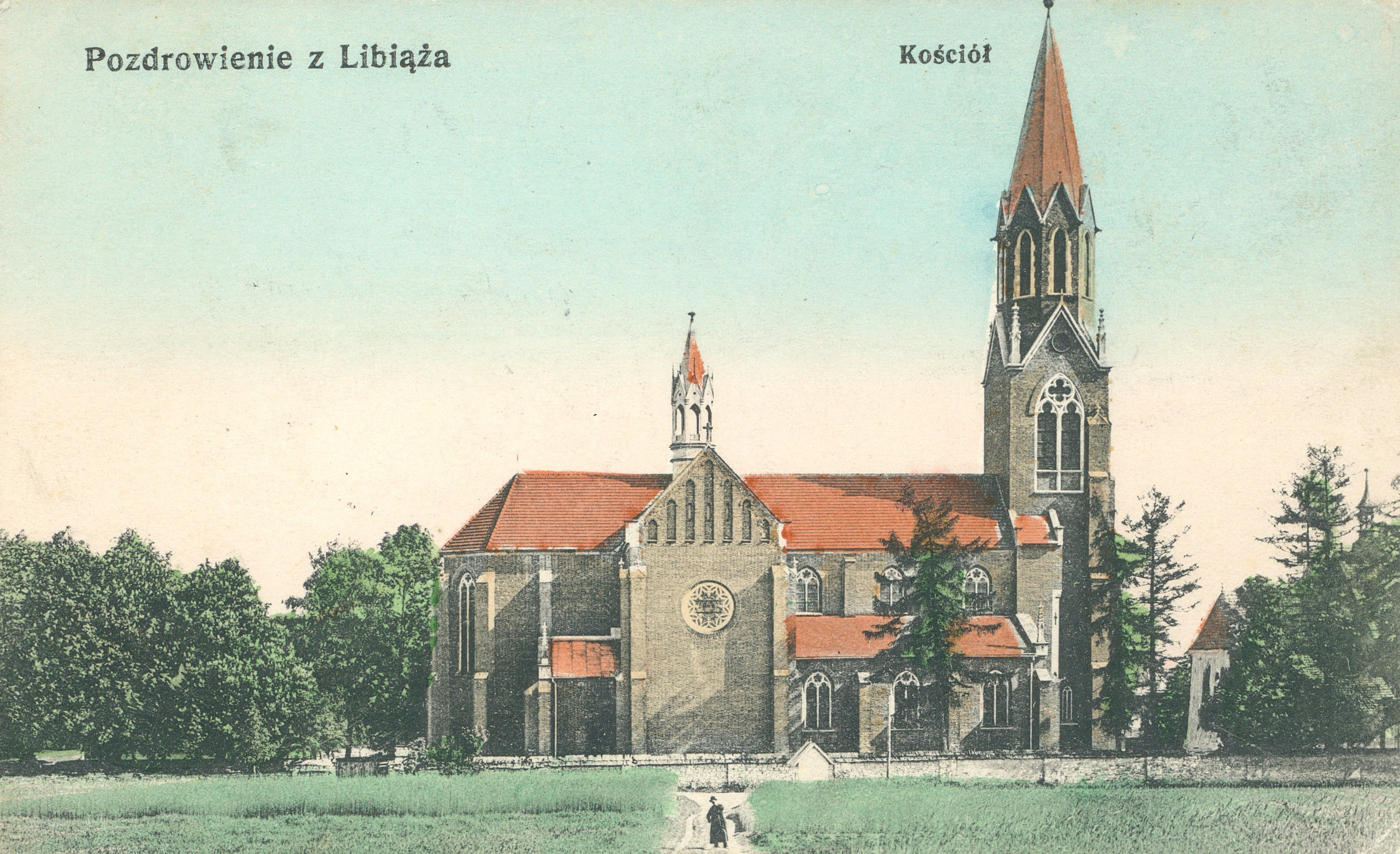
Church of the Transfiguration in the early 20th-century

The first historical mention of Libiąż comes from the chronicles of Jan Długosz. It mentioned the transfer of the settlements of Libiąż Wielki ("Great Libiąż") and Libiąż Mały ("Little Libiąż") to the Benedictines by the Griffin family in 1243. Throughout centuries Libiąż passed successively in the possession of various noble families.

Following the fragmentation of Poland in 1138, it belonged to the Seniorate Province, then possibly temporarily passed to the Duchy of Racibórz after 1179. Later on, it was administratively located in the Kraków County in the Kraków Voivodeship in the Lesser Poland Province of the Kingdom of Poland.

In 1735, Count Wielopolski founded the Catholic parish of the Transfiguration. Libiąż was annexed by Austria in the Third Partition of Poland in 1795. It was regained by Poles in the Austro-Polish War of 1809 and included within the short-lived Polish Duchy of Warsaw. After its dissolution, it was part of the Free City of Kraków from 1815 to 1846, when it was reannexed by the Austrian Empire. Until the nineteenth century it was a typical agricultural settlement. Construction of the railway line from Kraków to Vienna had caused migration and settlement of the population in these areas.

The turning point in the history of Libiąż came when rich deposits of coal were discovered in the late nineteenth century. At the beginning of the 20th century, the construction of a Janina Coal Mine, which since 1907 operates to this raw material. This has opened up new prospects for Libiąż. The local inhabitants were given jobs, and the town began to be attractive also for people from the outside. From that moment began a rapid economic and cultural development of the settlement. Skilled workers and intelligentsia came to Libiąż, and the urban landscape has changed. Around the mine began to form a new residential and public buildings (schools, post office and telegraph).

According to the Austrian census of 1900 in Libiąż Wielki there were 258 buildings inhabited by 1,452 people, all Polish-speaking, including 1,435 Catholics, 17 Jews, in Libiąż Mały there were 283 buildings inhabited by 1,557 people, including 1,546 Polish-speaking, 9 German-speaking and 2 others, including 1,522 Catholics, 33 of Jewish faith, and 2 Greek Catholics, and Moczydło had 59 houses inhabited by 283 people, all Polish-speaking, including 279 Catholics, and 4 people of Jewish faith.

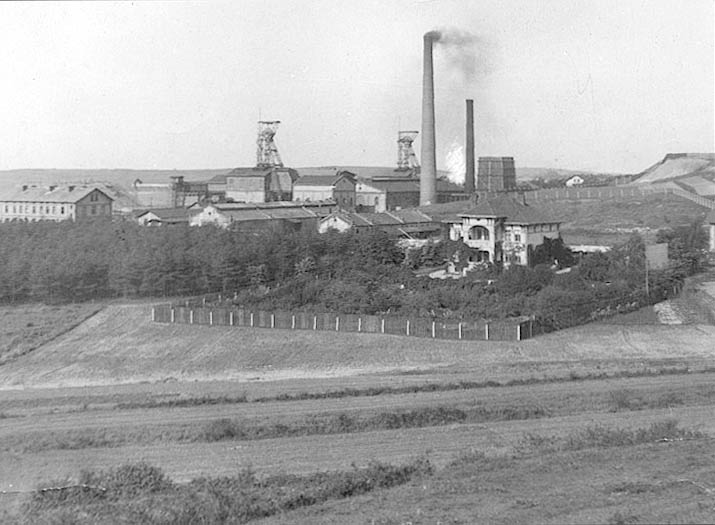
Janina Coal Mine in the 1930s

After World War I, in 1918, Poland regained independence and control of Libiąż. It experienced further urban and economic development. New routes were established, and power lines and new public buildings were built. It was located in the Kraków Voivodeship, and the interwar period was also a time of strong development of the local government.

During the invasion of Poland, which started World War II in September 1939, the town was invaded by Germany, and was one of the sites of executions of Poles carried out by German troops (see Nazi crimes against the Polish nation). The Janina Coal Mine stopped mining for a short time, but resumed it already in September 1939. During the German occupation, the occupiers operated the E562 forced labour subcamp of the Stalag VIII-B/344 prisoner-of-war camp at the Janina Coal Mine. From September 1943 to January 1945, there was also a subcamp of Auschwitz at the coal mine. There were over 800 prisoners in the subcamp of Auschwitz. During the occupation, a branch of the Armia Ludowa operated in the area.

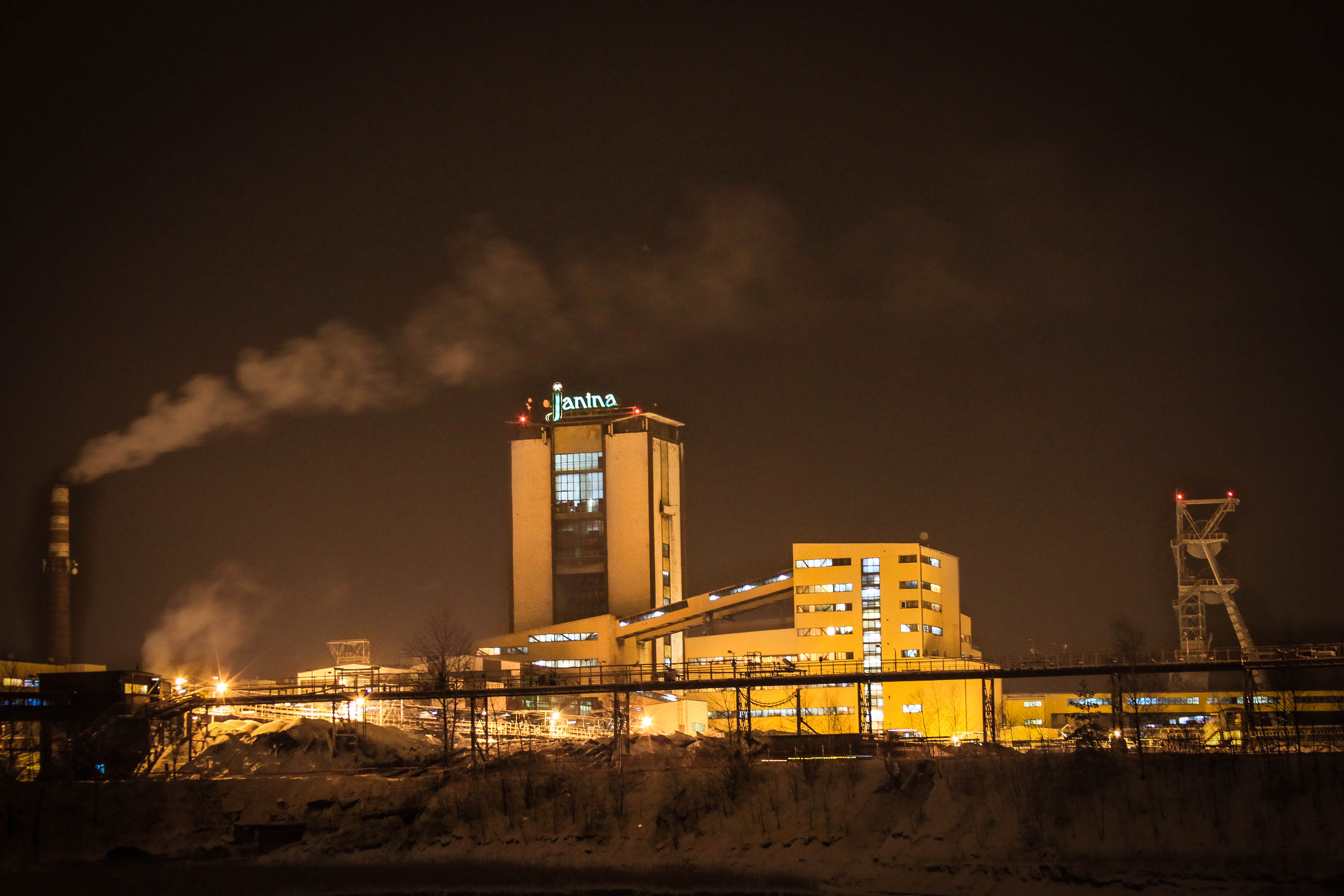
Janina Coal Mine

The period of the Second World War and the first post-war years hampered the social activity and self-government. Only the further development of the Janina mine caused a renewed influx of people to the area. This resulted in obtaining of town rights in 1969 by Libiąż Mały, which name was changed to simply Libiąż. The town absorbed the neighbouring settlement of Libiąż Wielki.

Currently, the cities and villages of Gmina Libiąż include the city of Libiąż itself and two village councils, Żarki and Gromiec.

== Transport ==
Voivodeship roads 780 and 933 pass through Libiąż, and the A4 motorway runs nearby, north of the town. There is also a train station in Libiąż.
