= Soła =

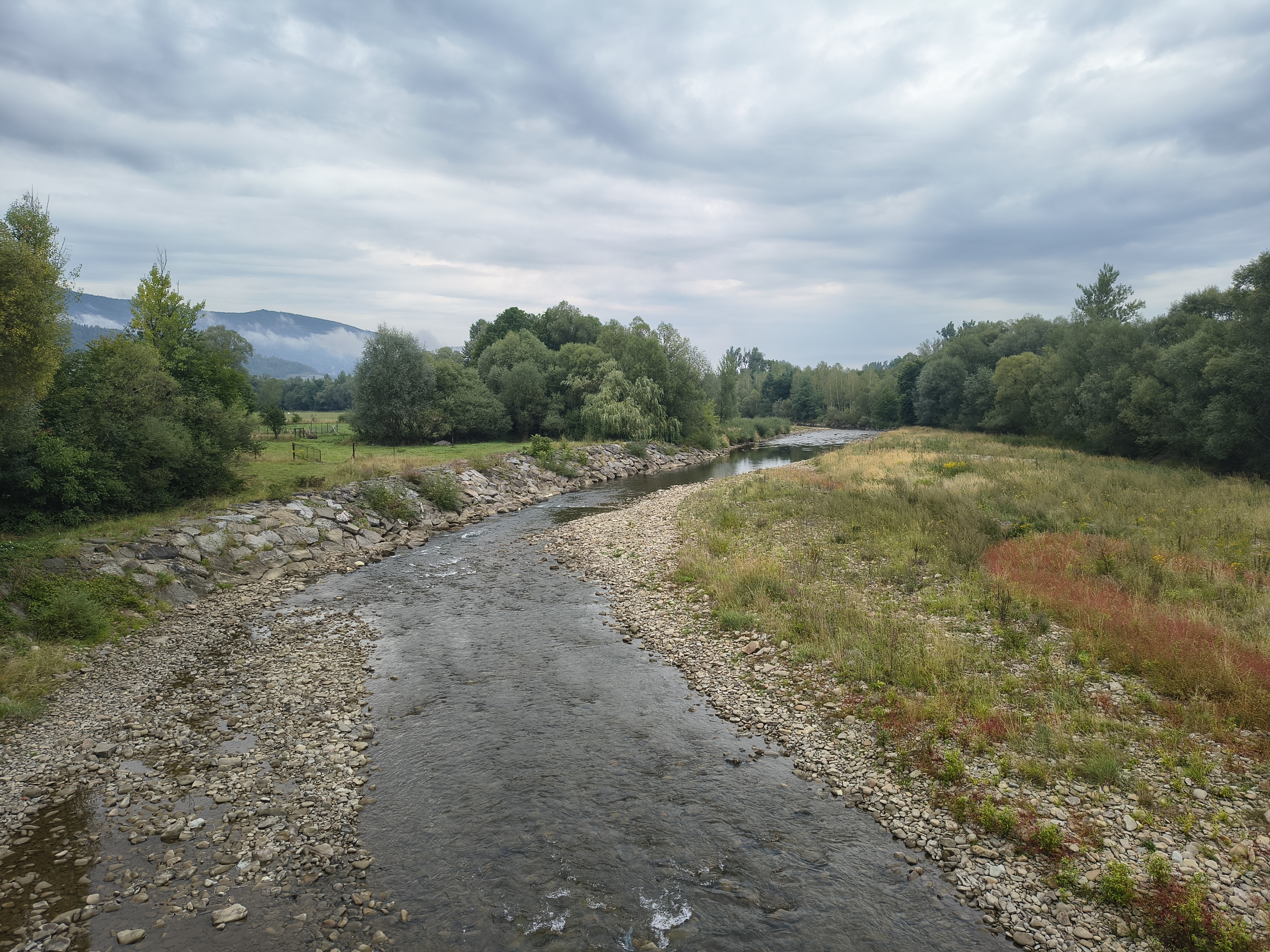
- Soła near Milówka

Location
- Country: Poland

Physical characteristics
- Source
  - location: Gmina Rajcza
  - coordinates: 49°29′27″N 19°03′17″E
  - elevation: 776 m (2,546 ft)
- Mouth
  - location: Broszkowice north of Oświęcim
  - coordinates: 50°3′12″N 19°14′47″E
- Length: 88.9 km (55.2 mi)
- Basin size: 1,375 km^{2} (531 sq mi)
- Discharge
  - average: 18.8 m^{3} (660 cu ft)

Basin features
- Progression: Vistula→ Baltic Sea

The Soła (Polish: [ˈsɔwa]) is a river in southern Poland, a right tributary of the Vistula.

The Soła originates in the Western Beskids mountain range near the border with Slovakia. It is made up of the confluence of several small creeks in the Rajcza municipality. It runs downhill northeastwards through Żywiec Basin to the towns of Żywiec and Kęty, forming the border between the Silesian and the Żywiec Beskids. After 89 km (55 mi), the Soła empties into the Vistula River after passing through the town of Oświęcim.

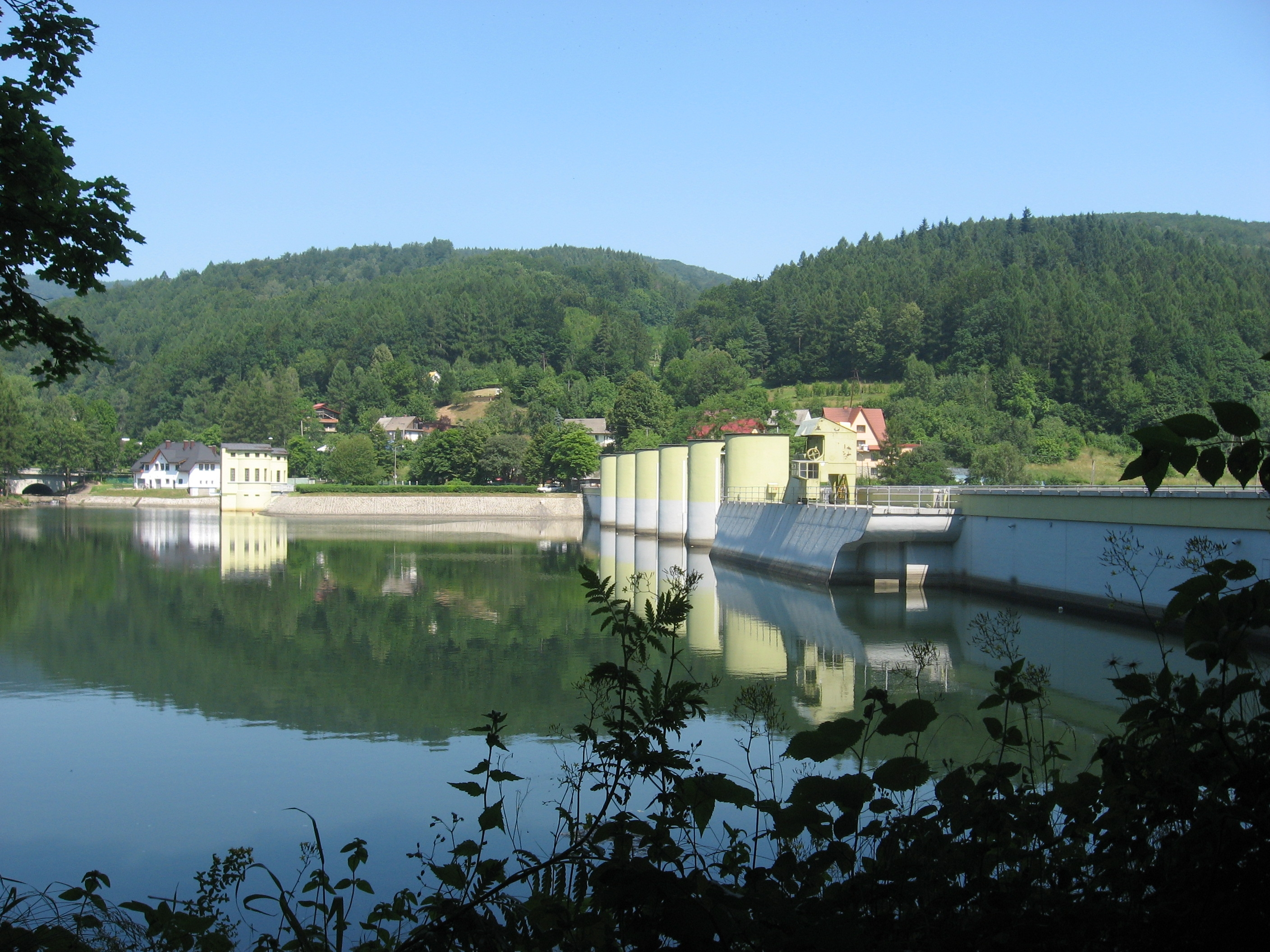
Dam on the Soła river in Porąbka with view of the artificial lake

The river flows within metres of the Auschwitz concentration camp. The Auschwitz-Birkenau State Museum informs that the human ashes and ground bones of those murdered there were often dumped into the river.

Soła flows through or near the following settlements: Rajcza, Milówka, Cisiec, Węgierska Górka, Cięcina, Radziechowy, Wieprz, Żywiec, Tresna, Czernichów, Międzybrodzie Żywieckie, Międzybrodzie Bialskie, Porąbka, Czaniec, Kobiernice, Kęty, Nowa Wieś, Hecznarowice, Bielany, Łęki, and Oświęcim.
