= Kozy railway station =

Railway station in Poland

Kozy
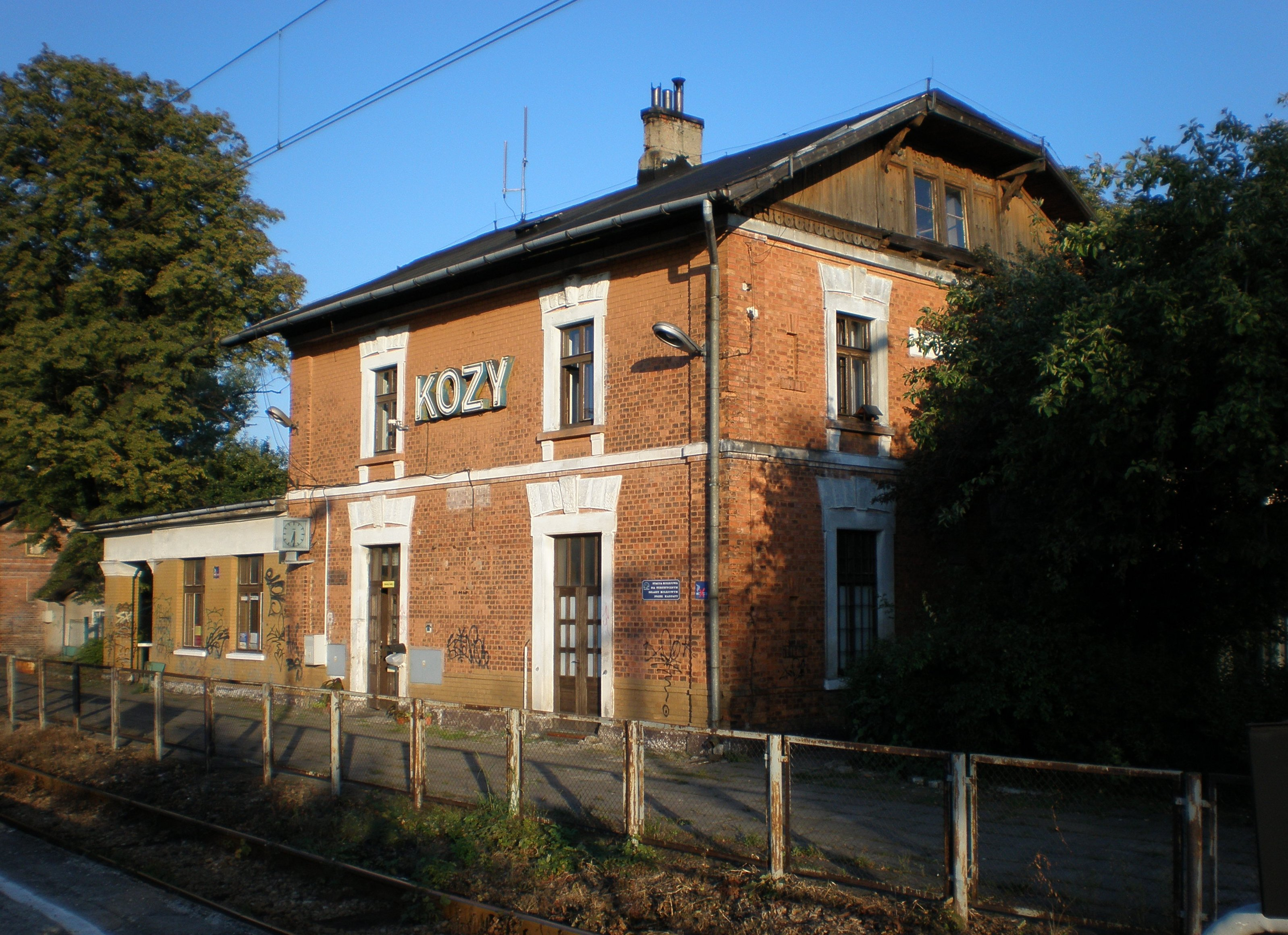
- The train station in 2008

General information
- Location: 29 Dworcowa Street, 43-340 Kozy; Poland
- Coordinates: 49°50′57″N 19°08′30″E
- Managed by: PKP Polskie Linie Kolejowe
- Line(s): Railway line 117^{[pl]}
- Platforms: 1
- Tracks: 2

History
- Opened: June 1, 1888

Passengers
- 50–99 per day

Kozy is a train station in Kozy, Bielsko County, Silesian Voivodeship, Poland. In 2021, the station served 50-99 passengers a day. It is managed by PKP Polskie Linie Kolejowe.

== History ==
The station was established in the then Austro-Hungarian Empire, it was opened on June 1, 1888, with the start of the railway line from Bielsko to Kalwaria Zebrzydowska, which was an extension of the Railway of Moravian-Silesian Cities^{[pl]}. Its first station master was Karol Schnapka from Opava, the second – from 1894 – Franciszek Knorre, and the third – from 1896 – Franciszek Merka. Later, from 1907, Stanisław Krzemień and from 1914, Andrzej Jakobsche.

On May 5, 1917, at the station in Kozy, the train on which the imperial couple, Charles I of Austria and Zita of Bourbon-Parma, was going to Kraków, stopped. They were greeted on the platform by Baron Marian Czecz de Lindenwald in Polish noble attire. In the 1920s, an extension was built at the station, and a waiting room was located in it.

From the 1910s to the 1970s or 1980s, there was a cableway connecting the station with the Kozy quarry^{[pl]}.
