= Gmina Osiek =

Gmina Osiek may refer to any of the following administrative districts in Poland:

- Gmina Osiek, Kuyavian-Pomeranian Voivodeship
- Gmina Osiek, Lesser Poland Voivodeship
- Gmina Osiek, Pomeranian Voivodeship
- Gmina Osiek, Świętokrzyskie Voivodeship
