= Kozy =

Kozy Seiffersdorf, Zajwyśdiüf
- Village
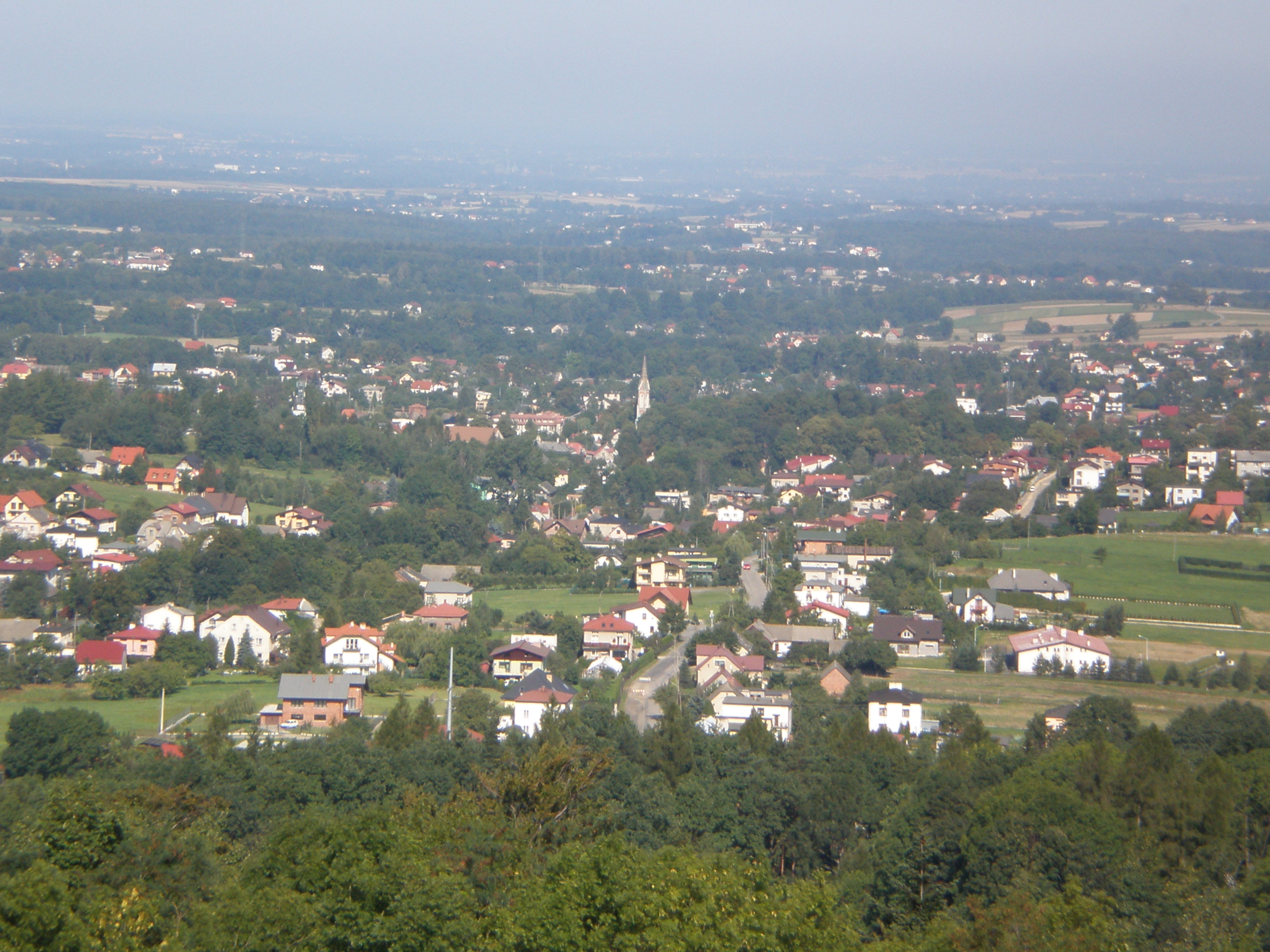
- Kozy village

- Coat of arms

- Location within Poland
- Coordinates: 49°50′42″N 19°08′30″E
- Country: Poland
- Voivodeship: Silesian
- County: Bielsko County
- Gmina: Kozy
- First mentioned: 1326
- Area: 26.9 km^{2} (10.4 sq mi)
- Elevation: 375 m (1,230 ft)
- Population: 13 024
  - Density: 476/km^{2} (1,230/sq mi)
- 2015
- Website: http://kozy.vot.pl/

Kozy [ˈkɔzɨ] (German: Seiffersdorf, Seibersdorf, Kosy (1941–45); Wymysorys: Zajwyśdiüf) is a large village with a population of 12,457 (2013) within Bielsko County, located in the historical and geographical south-west region of Lesser Poland, between Kęty and Bielsko-Biała, and about 65 kilometres south-west of Kraków and south of Katowice. It is the second largest village in Poland (by comparison - the population of Opatowiec, the smallest town in Poland, is only 338. Józefosław is the largest village with early 15,000 residents and surpassed Kozy in 2021). The village name translates to 'Goats' in English, and has an area of 26,9 km^{2}.

Since 1 January 1999, following Polish local government reforms adopted in 1998, Kozy has been part of the newly established Silesian Voivodeship (province); between 1975 and 1998 it was formerly part of the Bielsko-Biała Voivodeship. The village is well connected with the nearby city of Bielsko-Biała. It has a railway transport station, and lies on National Road No. 52. Kozy is the centre of the administrative district of Gmina Kozy.

== History ==
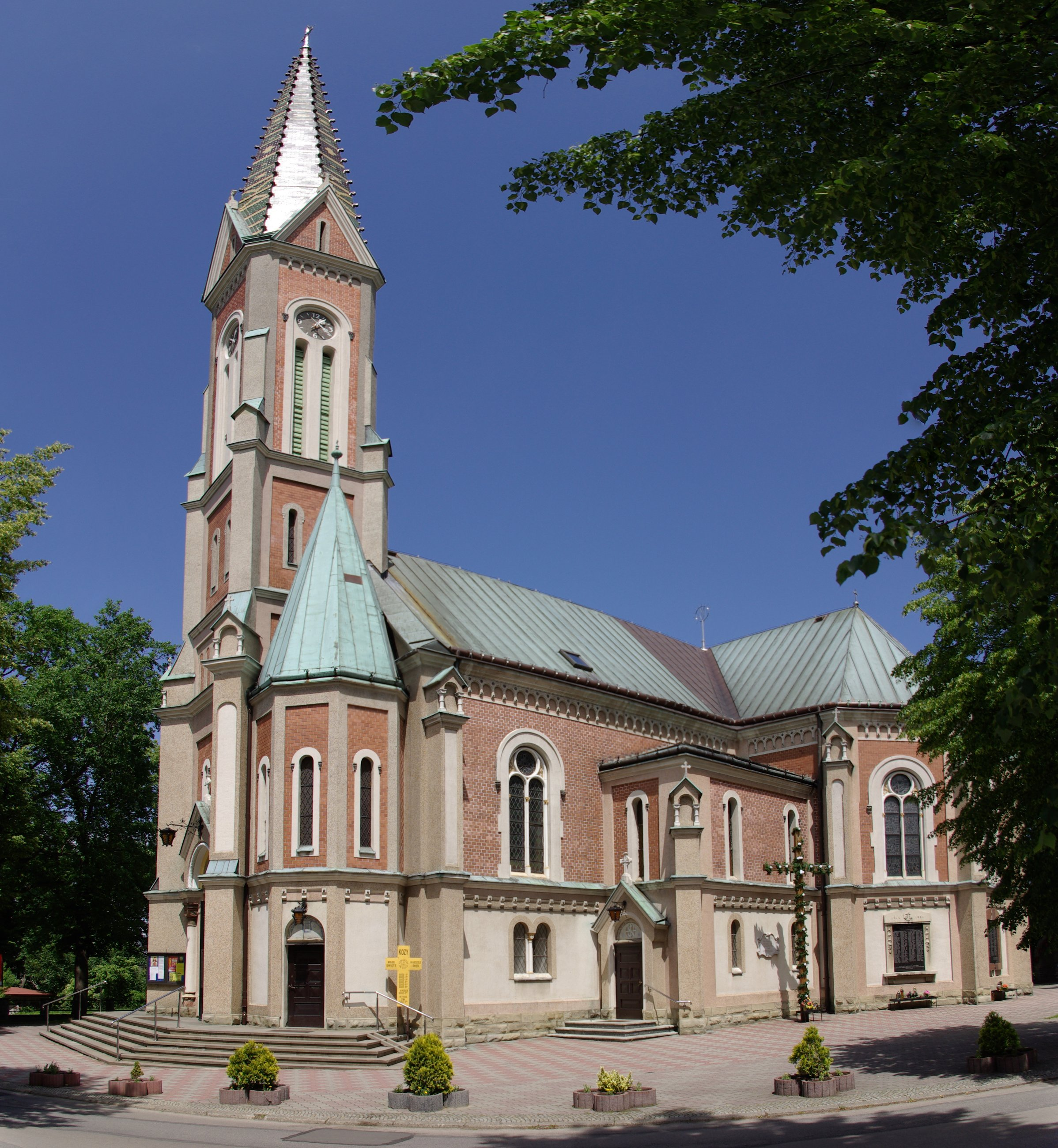
Neo-Gothic Catholic Church of St. Simon and Jude Tadeusza in Kozy.

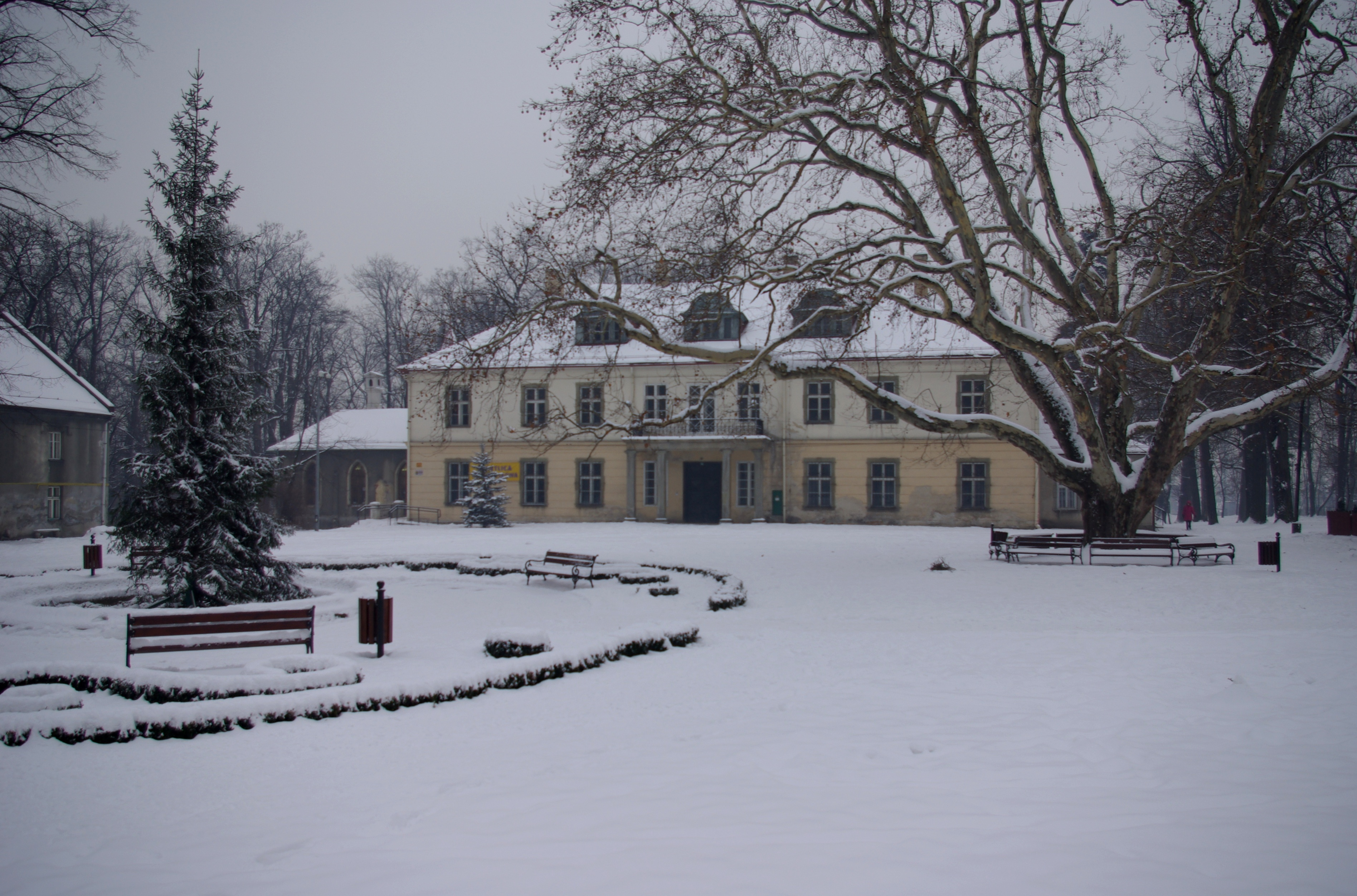
18th-century Palace manor in Kozy, built 1705. On the right, Poland's second oldest Platanus tree. During World War II, the manor buildings were commissioned as a hospital by the advancing Red Army.

Originally, these areas were part of Lesser Poland. The village settlement was first mentioned in 1326 under two names "Duabuscapris seu Siffridivilla" in Latin, translated as "two goats or goats village", recorded in the parish Peter's Pence list, deanery of Oświęcim, Roman Catholic Archdiocese of Kraków. In old Polish the village was known as Dwyekozy (Dwiekozie); two goats, and consisted of two settlements - Upper Kozy (Kozy Górne), and Lower Kozy (Kozy Dolne).

Kozy was historically located on lands held by the Silesian Piast since the end of 12th century, branch of the Polish royal Piast dynasty. The village was in the Duchy of Oświęcim. From 1327 the duchy was part of the Bohemian Crown lands (Kingdom of Bohemia). In 1457 the duchy was sold to the Polish king Casimir IV Jagiellon and returned to the Kingdom of Poland, and the village Kozy (and this area) again became part of Lesser Poland. In the accompanying document issued on 21 February the village was mentioned as Dwe Kozy. Kozy was a privately owned village, owned by such wealthy noble families as Mikołaj Szłop of Dębowiec during the 15th century and from the early 16th century became part of the House of Saszowski estates.

The village had a parish church, and castle fortification built during 1327–1330, which formed part of the Duchy defense system, surrounded by a rampart and moat, the castle had two wings and a bastion with 2–3 metre thick walls. The castle ruins remained visible until the mid-1930s, when it was sold and gradually dismantled for building materials, sporadic parts of the castle foundations remain. The first wooden church was built about 1326, and rebuilt during the 16th century after suffering fire damage. In 1559, the parish Catholic church was Reformed (to Calvinism), introduced to the parish by a member of the House of Saszowski, the nobleman and Burgrave of Kraków Jakub Saszowski of Gierałtowic. The church remained so until 1658, when during the Swedish Deluge, it was restored the Roman Catholic faith. The majority of village inhabitants, nevertheless, remained faithful to the Reforms. Although Kozy was in the Kingdom of Poland, the village community were mostly German-speaking, embraced the Protestant Reformation, and would thus come under persistent attack from the Catholic Church during and after the Counter-Reformation.

In the late 18th-century, the subsequent new village owners Jordanów, an affluent Polish burgher family from Kraków, started a strong local persecution of Protestants. In response, an exodus resulted, 64 families and 360 individual refugees with their belongings, crossed north-west from Kozy over the border at Dzieditz (Czechowice-Dziedzice) into Prussia controlled Upper Silesia, on the night of 25 April 1770, and there founded the village Anhalt (Holdynow/Hołdunów) near Pleß (Pszczyna). The escape route was secured by a Prussian Army cuirassier cavalry squadron escort under General Friedrich Wilhelm von Seydlitz; the resettlement was supported by the King of Prussia, Frederick the Great, who asked only whether the refugees from Poland understood German. Thus came a 200-year end in the history of evangelicalism in Kozy. Only a few, undecided inhabitants, remained in Kozy, and were subjected to further reprisals by the Jordanów landowners.

A few years later, in the First Partitions of Poland (1772), the Duchy of Oświęcim and thus the almost deserted village of Kozy, was annexed by the Habsburg Austrian Empire, as part of the Austrian Partition. Until November 1918, the Duchy of Oświęcim remained part of the Kingdom of Galicia and Lodomeria crown-lands of Austria. During the 19th-century, Kozy revived once again as one of the most affluent villages of Oświęcim Land, famous for its skilled stonemasons, carpenters and loom weaving cloth makers. The 16th-century parish wooden church, was demolished in 1899, paving way for the new neo-Gothic style church. The 16th-century church ceiling murals, however, were preserved and transferred into the collections of the National Museum in Kraków.

According to an Austrian census in 1900, the population of Kozy was 3,693, 403 buildings, and an area of 1,358 hectare (13.58 km^{2}); 3,646 residents were Roman Catholic, 1 Greek-Catholic, 40 Israelite, and 12 residents of other religion. 3,688 declared Polish- and 8 German-speaking, and 6 declared other language. In the Second Polish Republic (1918), the lands of Oświęcim and thus Kozy, were reincorporated into Poland's Kraków Voivodeship at the end of World War I. Following the 1939 Invasion of Poland, which started World War II, Kozy was occupied by Nazi Germany and annexed to the German Province of Upper Silesia. It was a local centre for the Polish resistance Home Army. The Red Army captured the village on 29 January 1945, ending the Nazi occupation. After the war, Kozy belonged to the administrative district (gmina) of Biała Wieś, and in 1954, it emerged as a separate administrative district Gmina Kozy.

=== Papal visit ===
In June 1979, Pope John Paul II's papal visit to Poland encompassed various papal motorcade trails. One such trail planned with the Vatican, was from Kozy to Straconka (Bielsko-Biała), where Pope John Paul II began his journey from the Church of St. Simon and Jude Tadeusza in Kozy.

== Places of cultural and touristic interest ==
- The forest pilgrimage Chapel of St. Mary with sacred spring (The place is called "Kapliczka Pod Panienką w Kozach"), est. 1908.
- The 18th-century palace, built 1705, manor grounds, and fountain. Includes Poland's second oldest Platanus tree. During World War II, the manor buildings were commissioned as a hospital by the advancing Red Army.
- The neo-Gothic parish church of St. Simon and Juda Tadeusz of Kozy.
- Archaeological post marking the place where once stood the 14th-century castle of the Dukes of Oświęcim.

== Nearby locations ==
- Bielsko-Biała
- Kęty
- Bujaków
- Międzybrodzie Bialskie

== International relations ==
=== Twin towns and sister cities ===
Kozy currently has three twin towns and sister cities

- Hričovské Podhradie, Slovakia
- Mošovce, Slovakia
- Jásztelek, Hungary
- Kenderes, Hungary

== Bibliography ==
- Długosz, Jan; Przezdziecki, Aleksander [in Polish] (1863) [1470–1480]. Liber beneficiorum dioecesis Cracoviensis; Joannis Długosz Senioris Canonici Cracoviensis, Opera Omnia [Book of Benefice diocese of Cracow; Joannis Długosz Senior Canon Cracow, Complete Works.] (in Latin). Vol. I (XI). Kraków: Ex Typographia Kirchmajeriana; Aleksander Przezdziecki. pp. 84–85, Index XI.
- Kuhn, Walter (1981). Geschichte der deutschen Sprachinsel Bielitz (Schlesien); im Auftrage der Historischen Kommission für Schlesien herausgegeben von Ludwig Petry und Josef Joachim Menzel [History of the German language enclave Bielsko (Silesia); issued on behalf of the Historical Committee for Silesia by Ludwig Petry and Joseph Joachim Menzel] (in German). Würzburg: Holzner Verlag.
- Wicherkiewicz, Tomasz (2003). The Making of a Language (Trends in Linguistics - Documentation 19): The Case of the Idiom of Wilamowice, Southern Poland. Kraków: Mouton de Gruyter. ISBN 9783110170993.
