= Gmina Czernichów =

Gmina Czernichów may refer to either of the following rural administrative districts in Poland:

- Gmina Czernichów, Lesser Poland Voivodeship
- Gmina Czernichów, Silesian Voivodeship
