= Kobiernice =

- Village
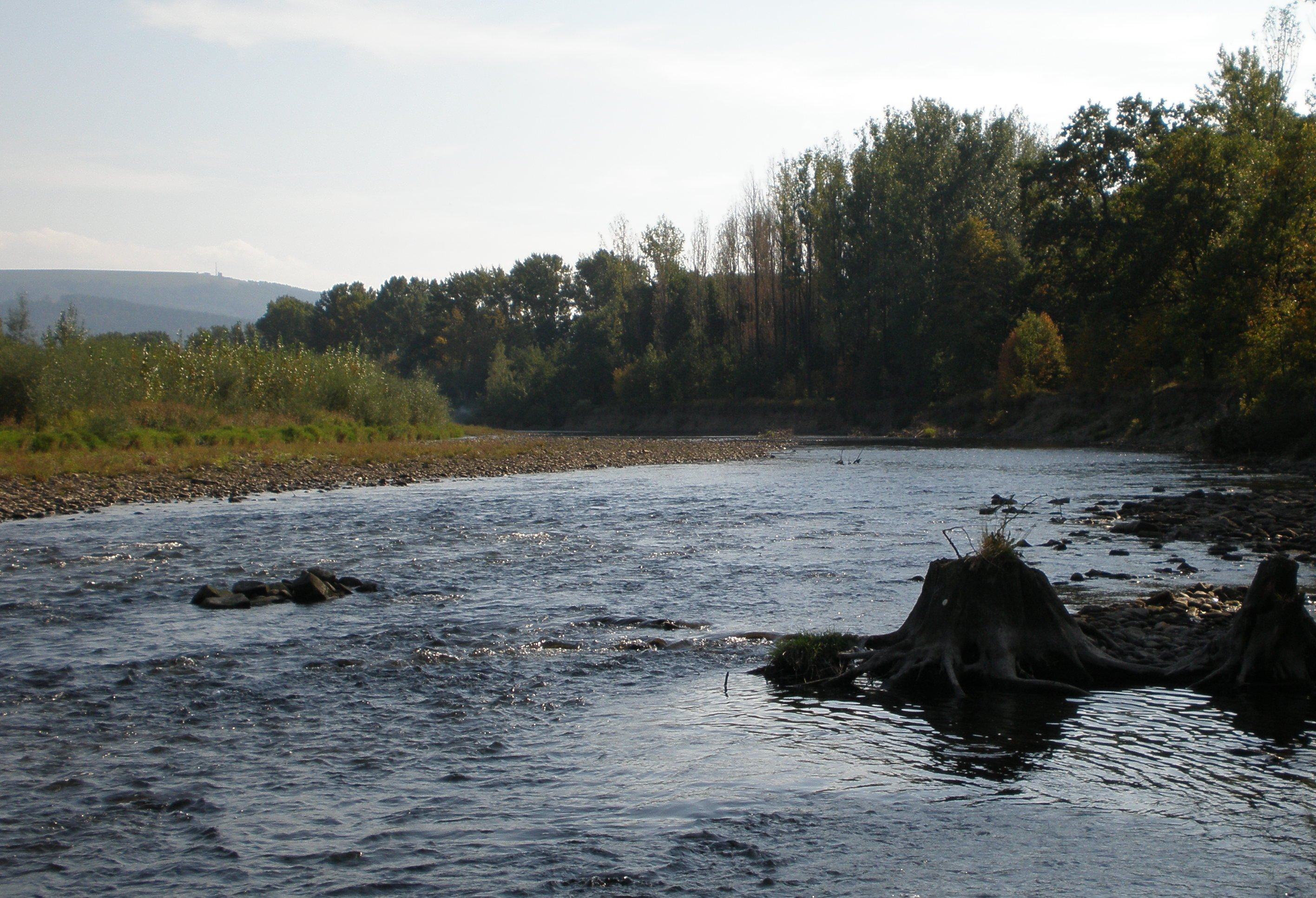
- Soła River in Kobiernice

- Location within Poland
- Coordinates: 49°51′N 19°13′E
- Country: Poland
- Voivodeship: Silesian
- County: Bielsko
- Gmina: Porąbka
- Population: 3,353

Kobiernice [kɔbjɛrˈnit͡sɛ] is a village in the administrative district of Gmina Porąbka, within Bielsko County, Silesian Voivodeship, in southern Poland.
