= Porąbka, Silesian Voivodeship =

Porąbka
- Village
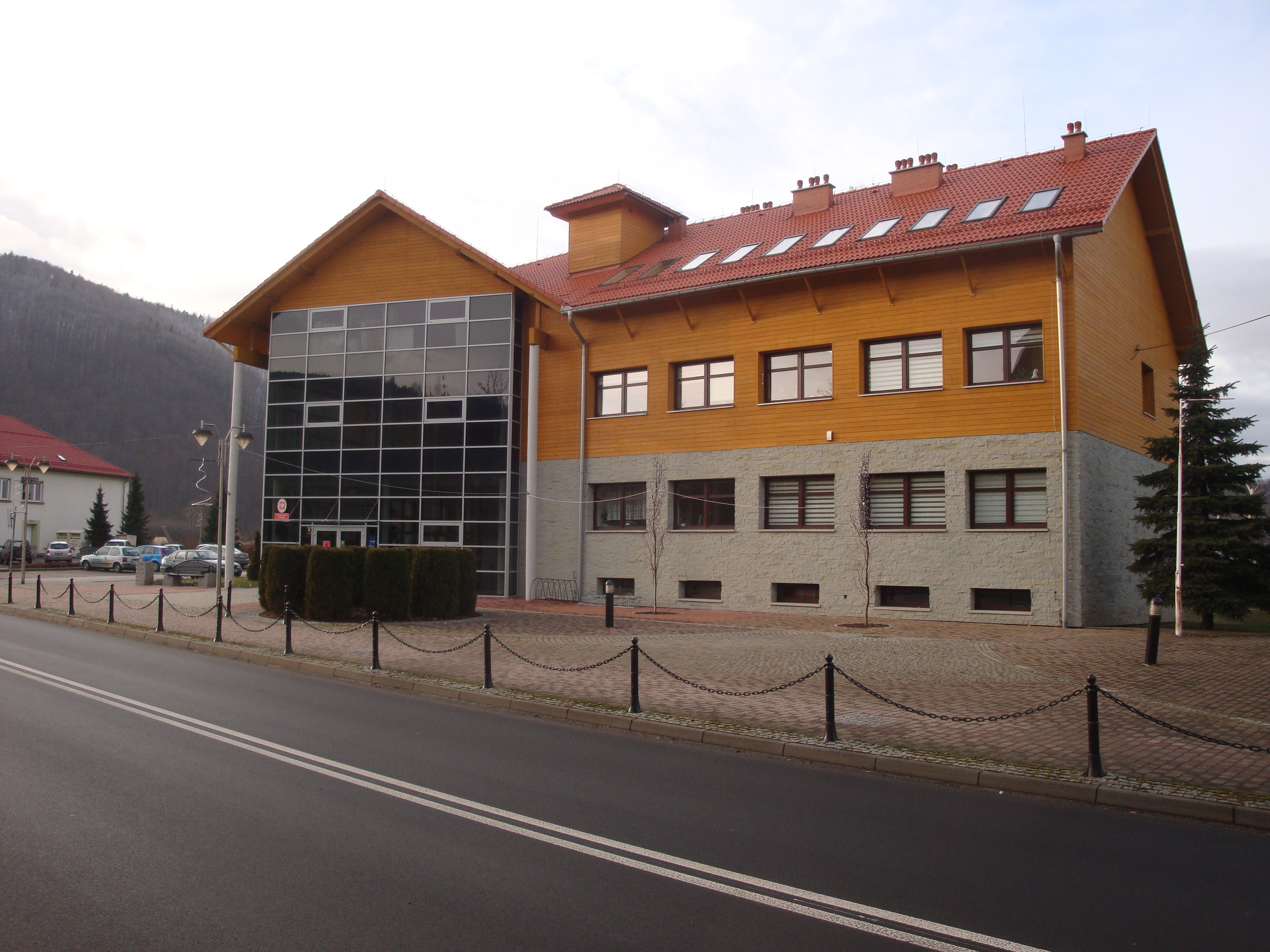
- Porąbka town hall

- Location within Poland
- Coordinates: 49°48′N 19°13′E
- Country: Poland
- Voivodeship: Silesian
- County: Bielsko
- Gmina: Porąbka
- Population: 4,044

Porąbka pronounced [pɔˈrɔmpka] is a village in Bielsko County, Silesian Voivodeship, in southern Poland. It is the seat of the gmina (administrative district) called Gmina Porąbka.

== History ==
The settlement originates from early 15th century, first mentioned in 1445 as part of the Duchy of Oświęcim.

Following the 1939 Invasion of Poland, which started World War II, Porąbka was occupied by Nazi Germany and annexed to the German Province of Upper Silesia. The Red Army captured the village on 29 January 1945, ending the Nazi occupation.

== Gallery ==
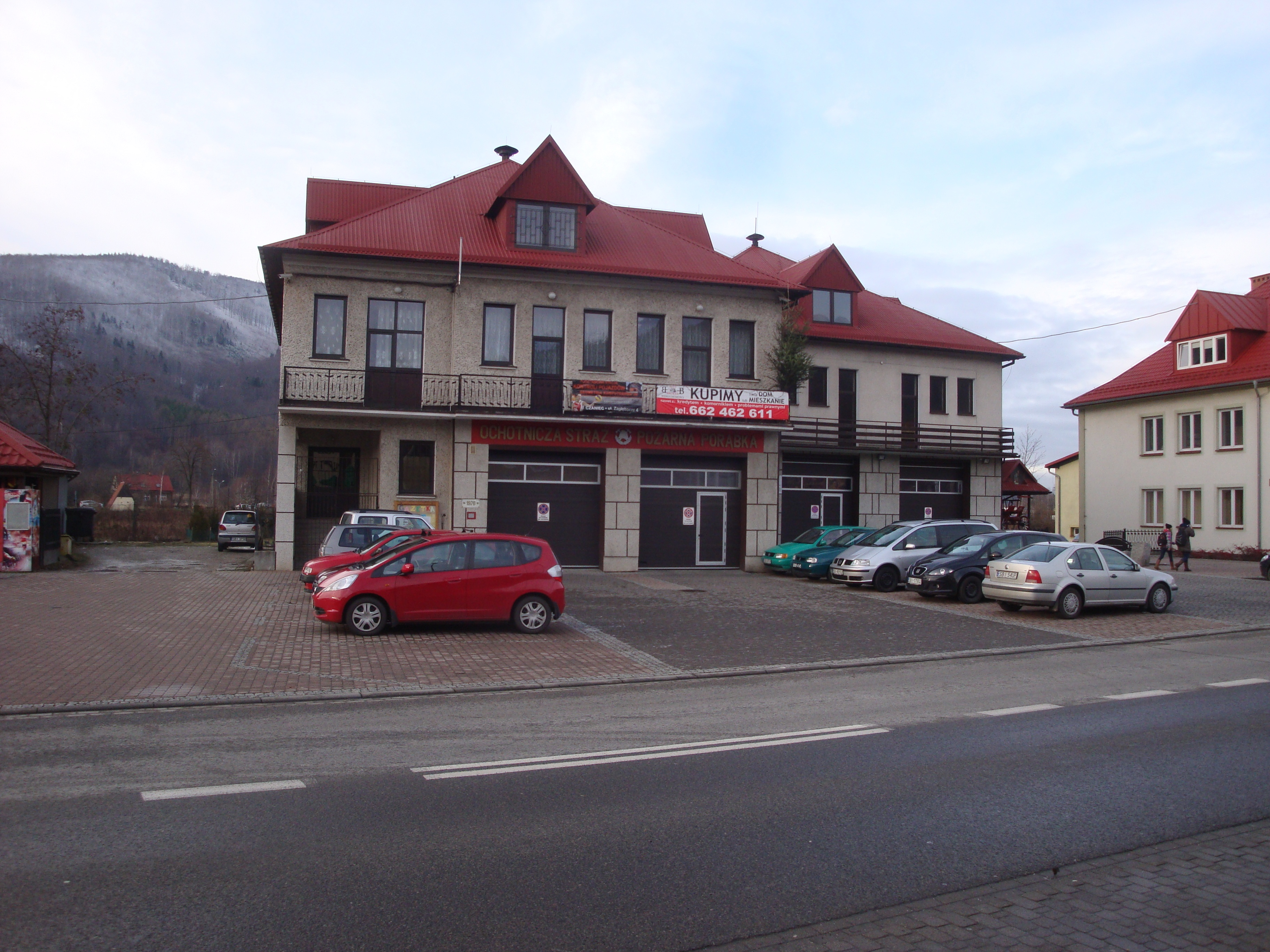
Porąbka fire department

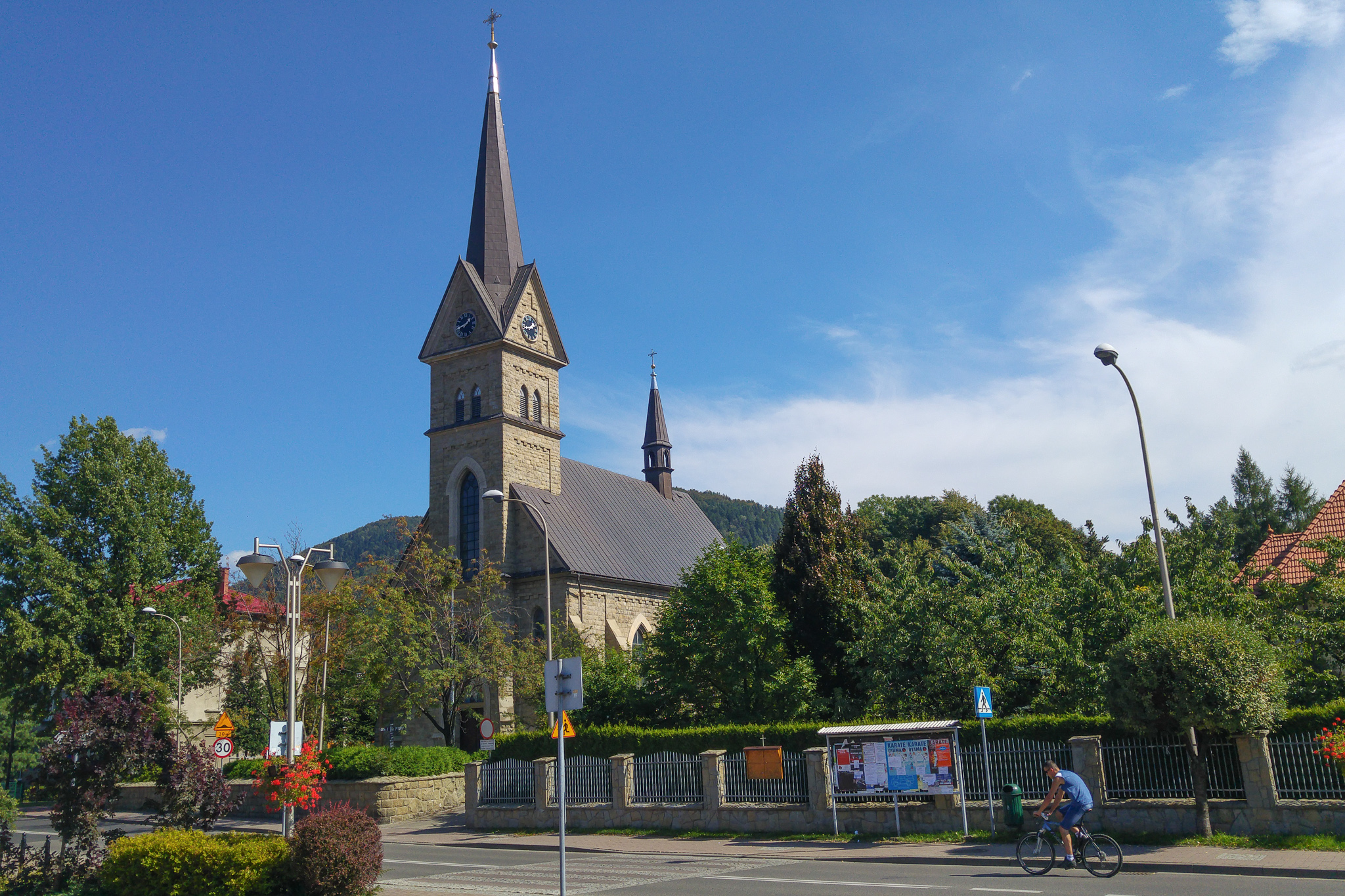
Church of Mary, mother of Jesus
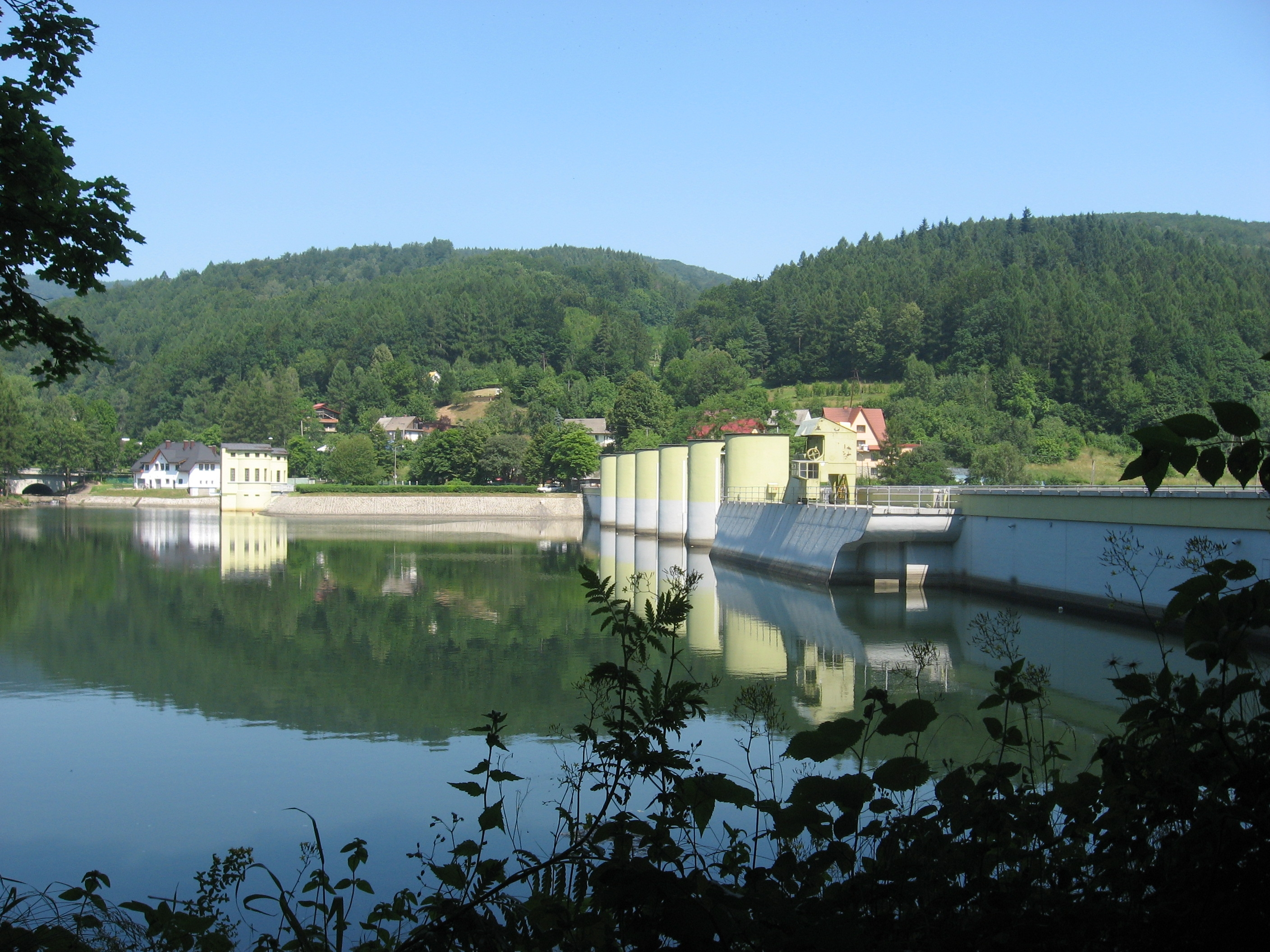
View of the artificial lake

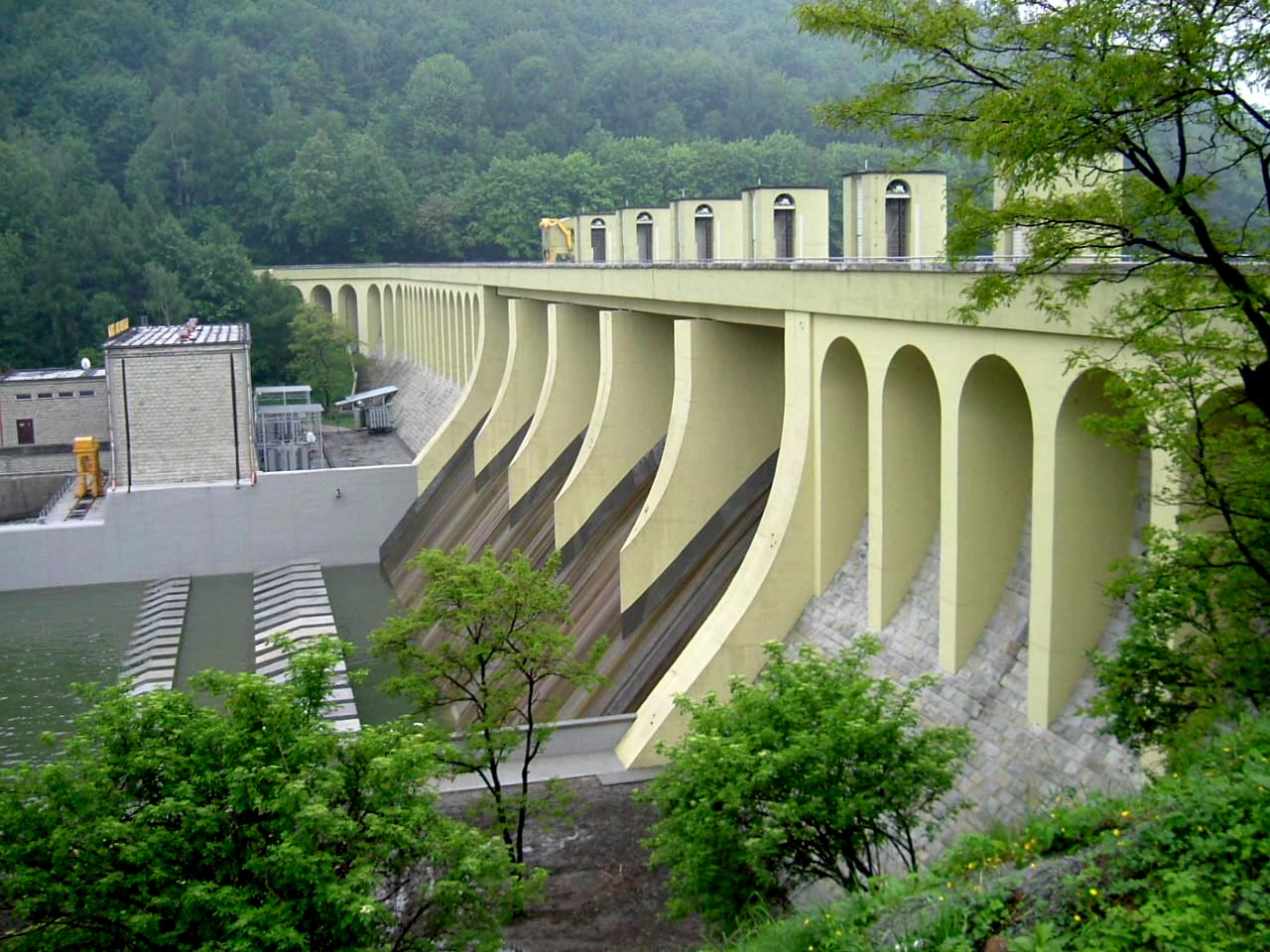
Dam on the Soła river in Porąbka
