= Gmina Kozy =

Gmina Kozy Kozy Commune
- Gmina
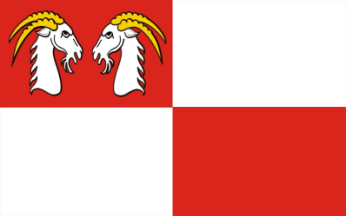
- Flag Coat of arms

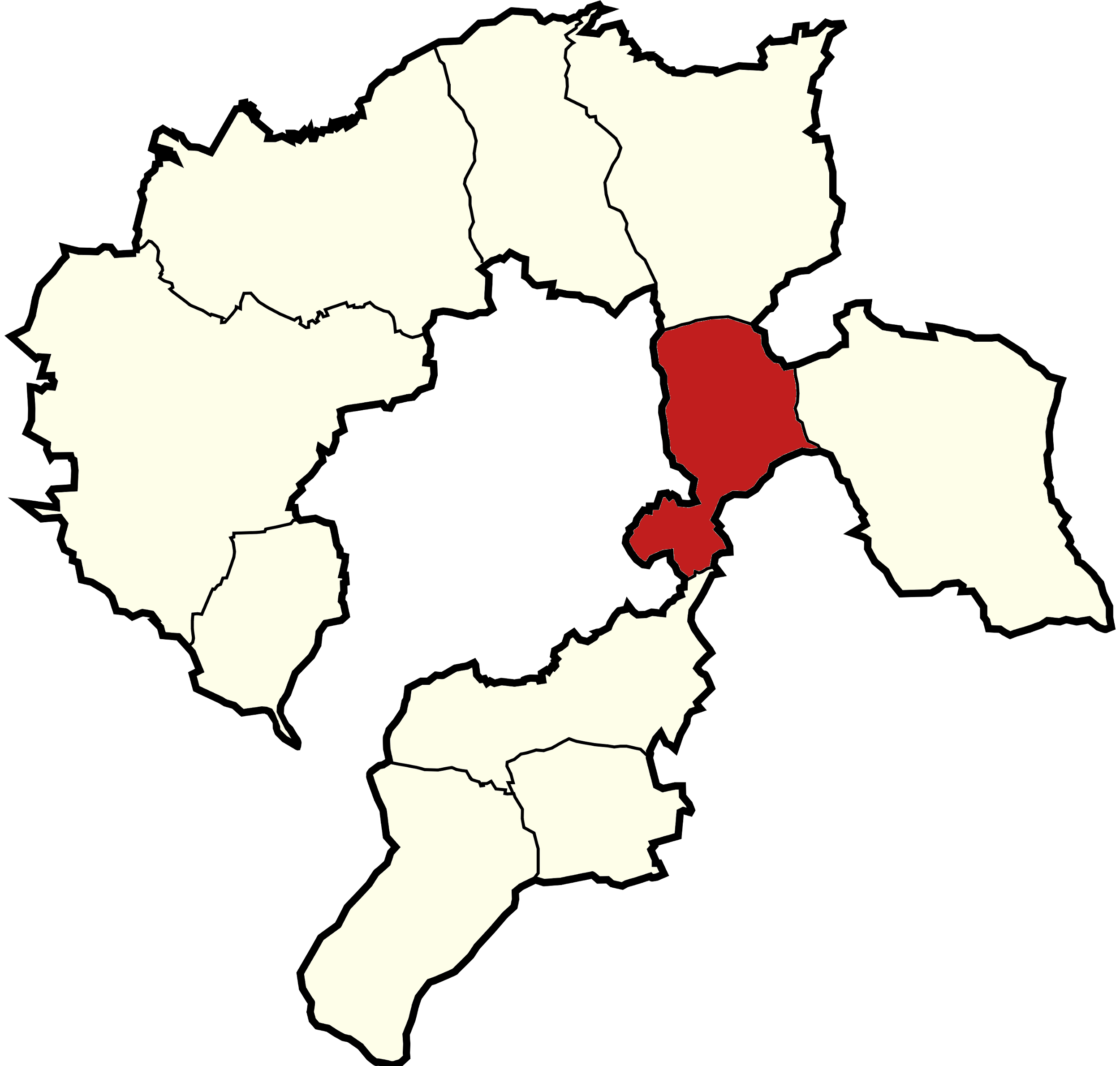
- Gmina Kozy within the Bielsko County
- Coordinates (Kozy): 49°50′42″N 19°8′30″E
- Country: Poland
- Voivodeship: Silesian
- County: Bielsko
- Seat: Kozy

Area
  - Total: 26.9 km^{2} (10.4 sq mi)

Population (2019-06-30)
  - Total: 12,979
  - Density: 482/km^{2} (1,250/sq mi)
- Website: https://www.kozy.pl

Gmina Kozy is a rural gmina (administrative district) in Bielsko County, Silesian Voivodeship, in southern Poland. Its seat is the village of Kozy, which lies approximately 6 kilometres (4 mi) east of Bielsko-Biała and 47 km (29 mi) south of the regional capital Katowice.

The gmina covers an area of 26.9 square kilometres (10.4 sq mi), and as of 2019 its total population is 12,979.

== Neighbouring gminas ==
Gmina Kozy is bordered by the city of Bielsko-Biała and by the gminas of Czernichów, Kęty, Porąbka, Wilamowice and Wilkowice.

== Twin towns – sister cities ==
Gmina Kozy is twinned with:

- Hričovské Podhradie, Slovakia
- Jásztelek, Hungary
- Kenderes, Hungary
- Mošovce, Slovakia
