= Bulowice =

- Village
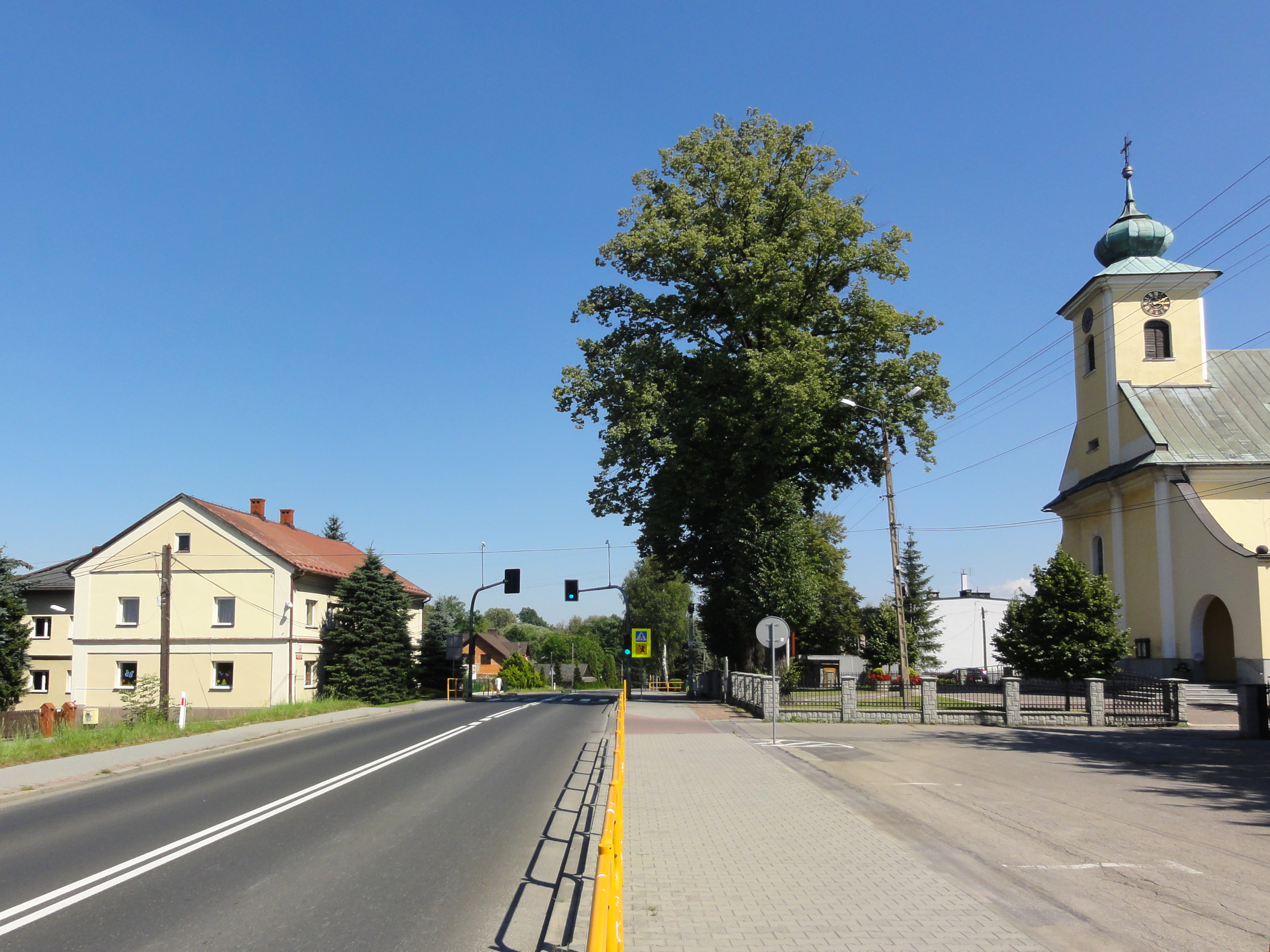

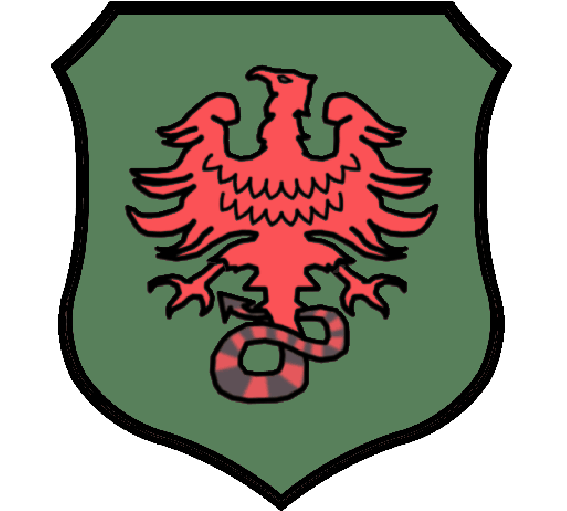
- Coat of arms

- Location within Poland
- Coordinates: 49°50′N 19°15′E
- Country: Poland
- Voivodeship: Lesser Poland
- County: Oświęcim
- Gmina: Kęty
- First mentioned: 1377
- Population: 4,664

Bulowice [bulɔˈvit͡sɛ] is a village in the administrative district of Gmina Kęty, within Oświęcim County, Lesser Poland Voivodeship, in southern Poland.

== History ==
The village was first mentioned in 1377 in the document which listed its noble owner, Rachnowski z Bulyvycz.

Politically the village belonged then to the Duchy of Oświęcim, formed in 1315 in the process of feudal fragmentation of Poland and was ruled by a local branch of Piast dynasty. In 1327 the duchy became a fee of the Kingdom of Bohemia. In 1457 Jan IV of Oświęcim agreed to sell the duchy to the Polish Crown, and in the accompanying document issued on 21 February the village was mentioned as Bulowicze.

The territory of the Duchy of Oświęcim was eventually incorporated into Poland in 1564 and formed Silesian County of Kraków Voivodeship. Upon the First Partition of Poland in 1772 it became part of the Austrian Kingdom of Galicia. In the 19th century the village belonged to the Larisch family, who erected a palace in 1882.

After World War I and fall of Austria-Hungary it became part of Poland. It was annexed by Nazi Germany at the beginning of World War II, and afterwards it was restored to Poland.
