= Gmina Kęty =

Gmina Kęty Kęty Commune
- Gmina
- Coat of arms
- Interactive map of Gmina Kęty
- Coordinates (Kęty): 49°54′N 19°13′E
- Country: Poland
- Voivodeship: Lesser Poland
- County: Oświęcim
- Seat: Kęty

Area
  - Total: 75.79 km^{2} (29.26 sq mi)

Population (2006)
  - Total: 33,598
  - Density: 443.3/km^{2} (1,148/sq mi)
  - Urban: 19,252
  - Rural: 14,346
- Website: http://www.kety.pl

Gmina Kęty is an urban-rural gmina (administrative district) in Oświęcim County, Lesser Poland Voivodeship, in southern Poland. Its seat is the town of Kęty, which lies approximately 17 kilometres (11 mi) south of Oświęcim and 55 km (34 mi) west of the regional capital Kraków.

The gmina covers an area of 75.79 square kilometres (29.3 sq mi), and as of 2006 its total population is 33,598 (out of which the population of Kęty amounts to 19,252, and the population of the rural part of the gmina is 14,346).

== Villages ==
Apart from the town of Kęty, Gmina Kęty contains the villages and settlements of Bielany, Bulowice, Łęki, Malec, Nowa Wieś and Witkowice.

== Neighbouring gminas ==
Gmina Kęty is bordered by the town of Oświęcim and by the gminas of Andrychów, Brzeszcze, Kozy, Osiek, Oświęcim, Porąbka, Wieprz and Wilamowice.
