= Osiek, Oświęcim County =

Osiek
- Village
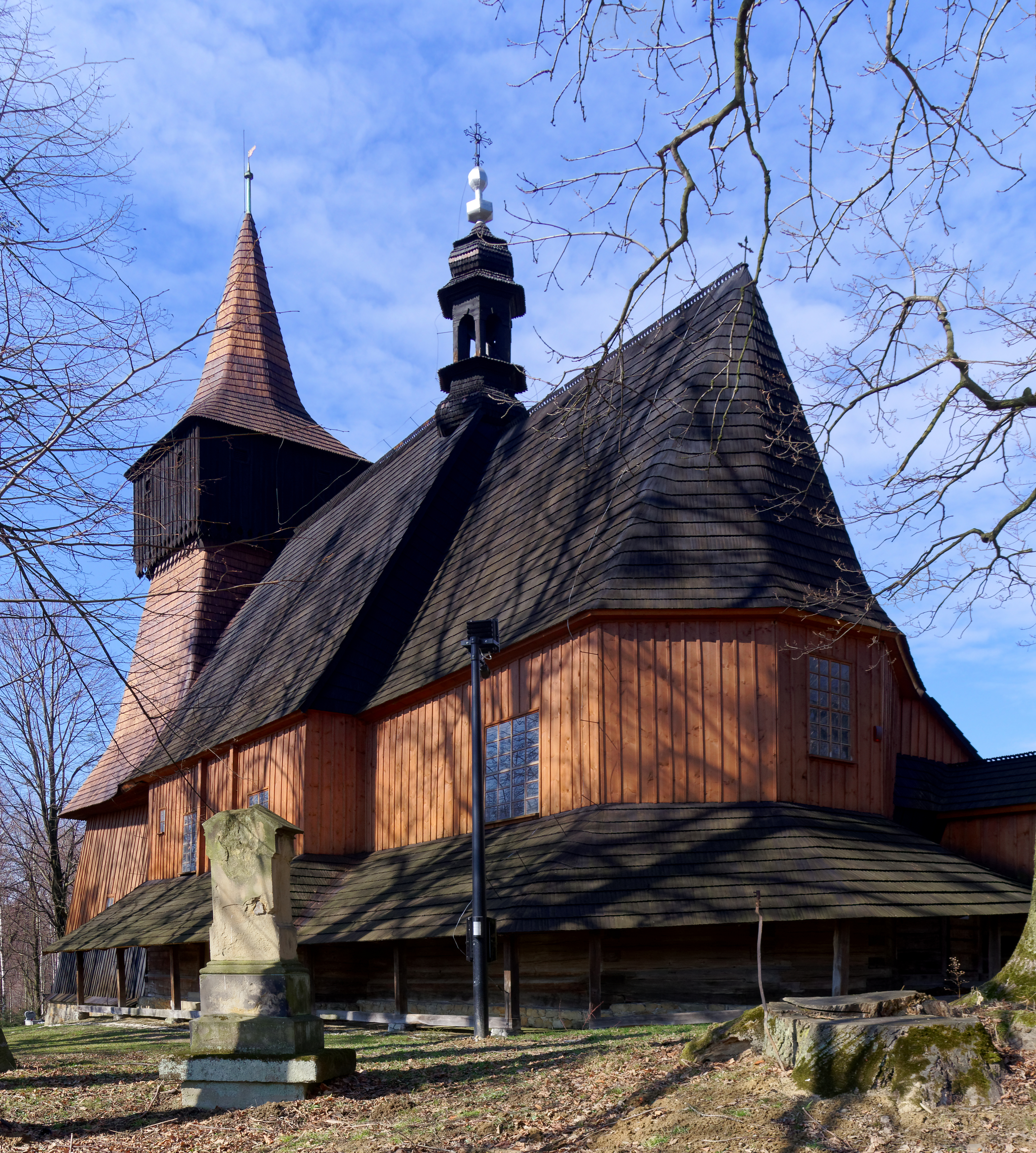
- 16th-century wooden church in Osiek

- Location within Poland
- Coordinates: 49°56′57″N 19°15′57″E
- Country: Poland
- Voivodeship: Lesser Poland
- County: Oświęcim
- Gmina: Osiek
- First mentioned: 1278
- Population: 6,300
- Website: https://www.osiek.pl/

Osiek [ˈɔɕɛk] is a village in Oświęcim County, Lesser Poland Voivodeship, in southern Poland. It is the seat of the gmina (administrative district) called Gmina Osiek.

== History ==
The village and a local church were first mentioned in 1278 as ecclesia de Ossech. It was again mentioned in 1326 in the register of Peter's Pence payment among Catholic parishes of Oświęcim deaconry of the Diocese of Kraków as Ossek.

Politically it belonged initially to the Duchy of Opole and Racibórz and the Castellany of Oświęcim, which was in 1315 formed in the process of feudal fragmentation of Poland into the Duchy of Oświęcim, ruled by a local branch of Silesian Piast dynasty. In 1327 the duchy became a fee of the Kingdom of Bohemia. In 1457 Jan IV of Oświęcim agreed to sell the duchy to the Polish Crown, and in the accompanying document issued on 21 February the village was mentioned as Osschek.

The territory of the Duchy of Oświęcim was eventually incorporated into Poland in 1564 and formed Silesian County of Kraków Voivodeship. Upon the First Partition of Poland in 1772 it became part of the Austrian Kingdom of Galicia. After World War I and fall of Austria-Hungary it became part of Poland. It was annexed by Nazi Germany at the beginning of World War II, and afterwards it was restored to Poland.
