= Gmina Porąbka =

Rural district in Silesian Voivodeship, Poland

Gmina Porąbka Porąbka Commune
- Gmina
- Coat of arms

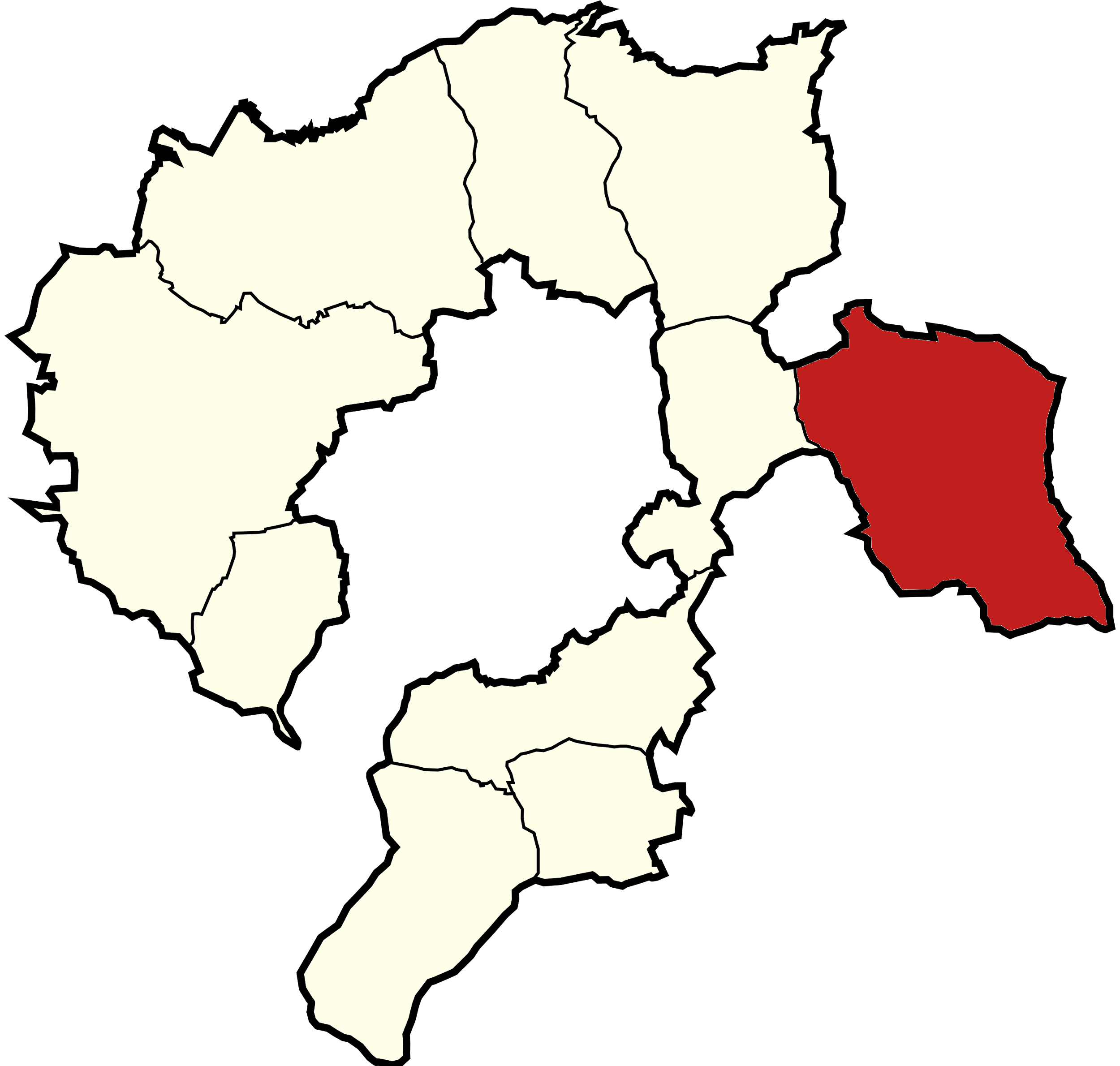
- Gmina Porąbka within the Bielsko County
- Coordinates (Porąbka): 49°49′6″N 19°13′0″E
- Country: Poland
- Voivodeship: Silesian
- County: Bielsko
- Seat: Porąbka

Area
  - Total: 64.59 km^{2} (24.94 sq mi)

Population (2019-06-30)
  - Total: 15,582
  - Density: 241.2/km^{2} (624.8/sq mi)
- Website: http://www.porabka.pl

Gmina Porąbka is a rural gmina (administrative district) in Bielsko County, Silesian Voivodeship, in southern Poland. Its seat is the village of Porąbka, which lies approximately 11 kilometres (7 mi) east of Bielsko-Biała and 51 km (32 mi) south of the regional capital Katowice.

The gmina covers an area of 64.59 square kilometres (24.9 sq mi), and as of 2019 its total population is 15,582.

== Villages ==
Gmina Porąbka contains the villages and settlements of Bujaków, Czaniec, Kobiernice and Porąbka.

== Neighbouring gminas ==
Gmina Porąbka is bordered by the gminas of Andrychów, Czernichów, Kęty, Kozy and Łękawica.

== Twin towns – sister cities ==
Gmina Porąbka is twinned with:

- Túrkeve, Hungary
