= Gmina Osiek, Lesser Poland Voivodeship =

Gmina Osiek Osiek Commune
- Gmina
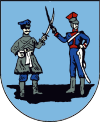
- Coat of arms
- Interactive map of Gmina Osiek
- Coordinates (Osiek): 49°56′57″N 19°15′57″E
- Country: Poland
- Voivodeship: Lesser Poland
- County: Oświęcim
- Seat: Osiek

Area
  - Total: 41.18 km^{2} (15.90 sq mi)

Population (2006)
  - Total: 7,857
  - Density: 190.8/km^{2} (494.2/sq mi)
- Website: https://www.osiek.pl

Gmina Osiek is a rural gmina (administrative district) in Oświęcim County, Lesser Poland Voivodeship, in southern Poland. Its seat is the village of Osiek; it also contains the village of Głębowice.

The gmina covers an area of 41.18 square kilometres (15.9 sq mi), and as of 2006 its total population is 7,857.

== Neighbouring gminas ==
Gmina Osiek is bordered by the gminas of Kęty, Oświęcim, Polanka Wielka and Wieprz.
