= Czernichów, Silesian Voivodeship =

Czernichów
- Village
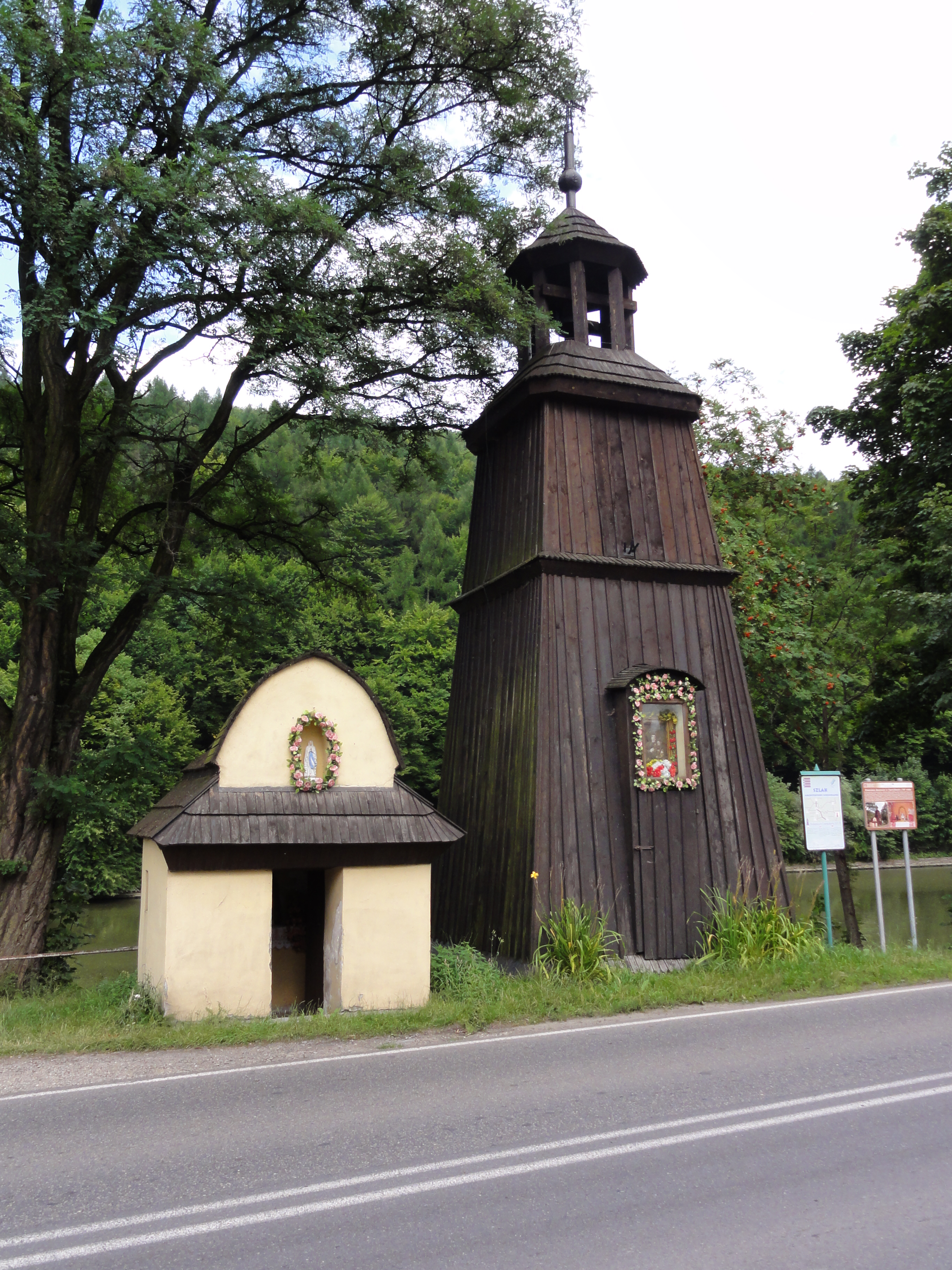
- Chapel and wooden belfry

- Location within Poland
- Coordinates: 49°45′N 19°12′E
- Country: Poland
- Voivodeship: Silesian
- County: Żywiec
- Gmina: Czernichów
- Established: first half of the 16th century
- Highest elevation: 400 m (1,300 ft)
- Lowest elevation: 330 m (1,080 ft)
- Population: 1,136

Czernichów [t͡ʂɛrˈɲixuf] is a village in Żywiec County, Silesian Voivodeship, in southern Poland. It is the seat of the gmina (administrative district) called Gmina Czernichów.

The village was most probably established in the first half of the 16th century either by Vlachs or Germans.

Czernichów is twinned with:

- Bicester, Oxfordshire in Great Britain
