= Międzybrodzie Bialskie =

- Village
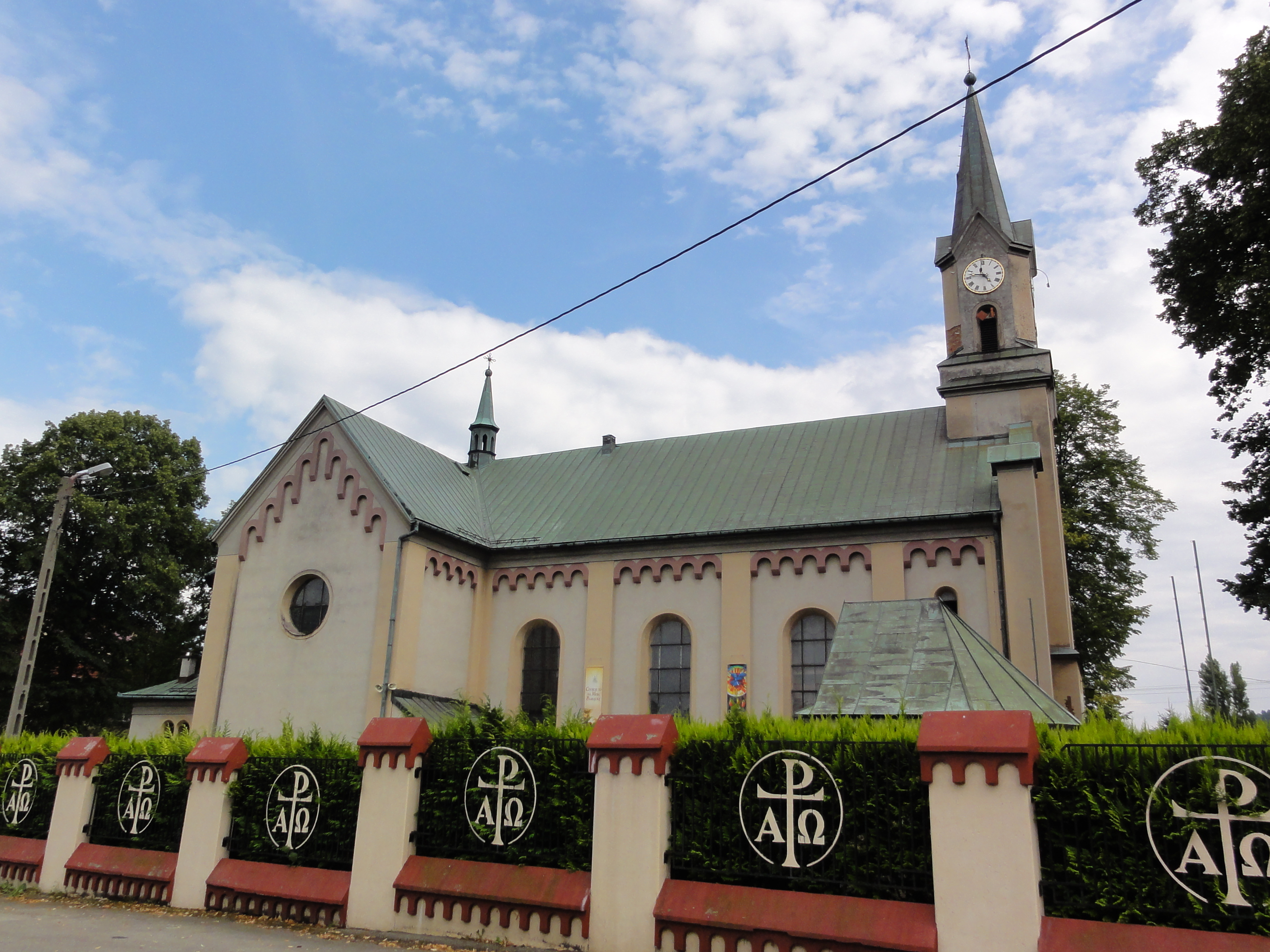
- Saint Mary Magdalene Church

- Location within Poland
- Coordinates: 49°47′N 19°11′E
- Country: Poland
- Voivodeship: Silesian
- County: Żywiec
- Gmina: Czernichów
- Highest elevation: 600 m (2,000 ft)
- Lowest elevation: 320 m (1,050 ft)
- Population: 3,154

Międzybrodzie Bialskie [mjɛnd͡zɨˌbrɔd͡ʑɛ ˈbjalskʲɛ] is a village in the administrative district of Gmina Czernichów, within Żywiec County, Silesian Voivodeship, in southern Poland.

It is located on the western shore of Lake Międzybrodzkie, on the left bank of the Soła river, in the valleys of the Ponikwa, Żarnówka Duża and Żarnówka Mała streams, on the slopes of Rogacz, Magurka Wilkowicka and Chrobacza Łąka. It is a tourist and holiday destination and a center for water sports.

== Points of interest ==
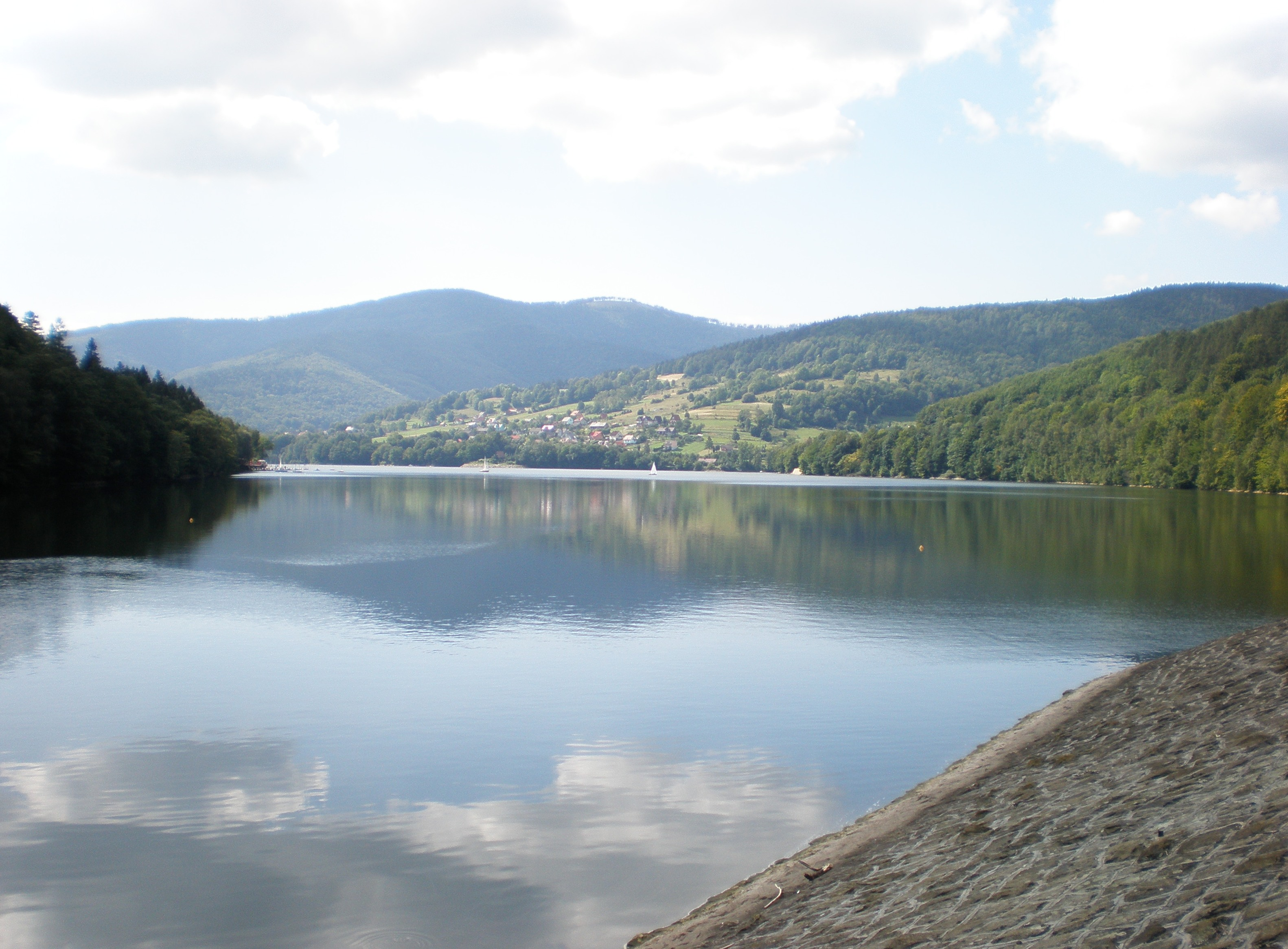
Lake Międzybrodzkie on the Soła river at the foot of Międzybrodzie Bialskie village, located 30 kilometres (19 mi) south of Oświęcim about half-an-hour drive along Road DW 948
