= Bielany, Lesser Poland Voivodeship =

Bielany Błaon
- Village
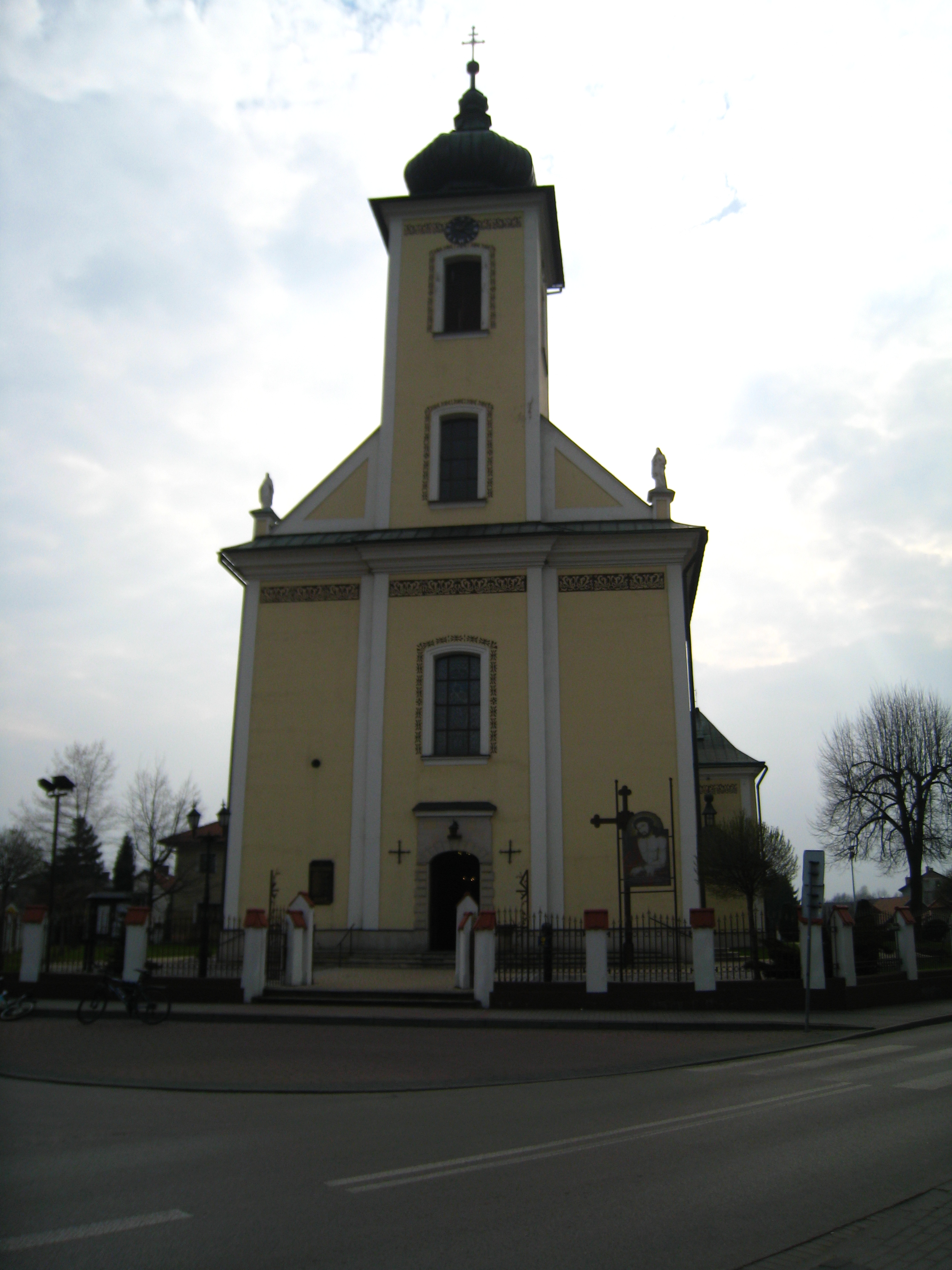
- Saint Matthias Church

- Location within Poland
- Coordinates: 49°56′20″N 19°12′15″E
- Country: Poland
- Voivodeship: Lesser Poland
- County: Oświęcim
- Gmina: Kęty
- First mentioned: 1457
- Population: 1,882

Bielany [bjɛˈlanɨ] (Wymysorys: Błaon) is a village in the administrative district of Gmina Kęty, within Oświęcim County, Lesser Poland Voivodeship, in southern Poland.

== History ==
The village was first mentioned on 21 January 1457 as Byelany in the document of Jan IV of Oświęcim, in which the duke agreed to sell the Duchy of Oświęcim to the Crown of the Kingdom of Poland.

The territory of the Duchy of Oświęcim was eventually incorporated into Poland in 1564 and formed part of the Silesian County of the Kraków Voivodeship. Upon the First Partition of Poland in 1772 it became part of the Austrian Kingdom of Galicia. After World War I and the collapse of Austria-Hungary it became part of Poland. It was annexed by Nazi Germany at the beginning of World War II, afterwards becoming part of Poland.
