= Gmina Czernichów, Silesian Voivodeship =

Gmina Czernichów Czernichów Commune
- Gmina
- Coat of arms

- Coordinates (Czernichów): 49°45′12″N 19°12′25″E
- Country: Poland
- Voivodeship: Silesian
- County: Żywiec
- Seat: Czernichów

Area
  - Total: 56.26 km^{2} (21.72 sq mi)

Population (2019-06-30)
  - Total: 6,774
  - Density: 120.4/km^{2} (311.8/sq mi)
- Website: http://www.czernichow.com.pl

Gmina Czernichów is a rural gmina (administrative district) in Żywiec County, Silesian Voivodeship, in southern Poland. Its seat is the village of Czernichów, which lies approximately 8 kilometres (5 mi) north of Żywiec and 58 km (36 mi) south of the regional capital Katowice.

The gmina covers an area of 56.26 square kilometres (21.7 sq mi), and as of 2019 its total population is 6,774.

== Villages ==
Gmina Czernichów contains the villages and settlements of Czernichów, Międzybrodzie Bialskie, Międzybrodzie Żywieckie and Tresna.

== Neighbouring gminas ==
Gmina Czernichów is bordered by the towns of Bielsko-Biała and Żywiec, and by the gminas of Kozy, Łękawica, Łodygowice, Porąbka and Wilkowice.

== Twin towns – sister cities ==
Gmina Czernichów is twinned with:

- Costa di Rovigo, Italy
- Neuvy, France
