= Międzybrodzie Żywieckie =

- Village
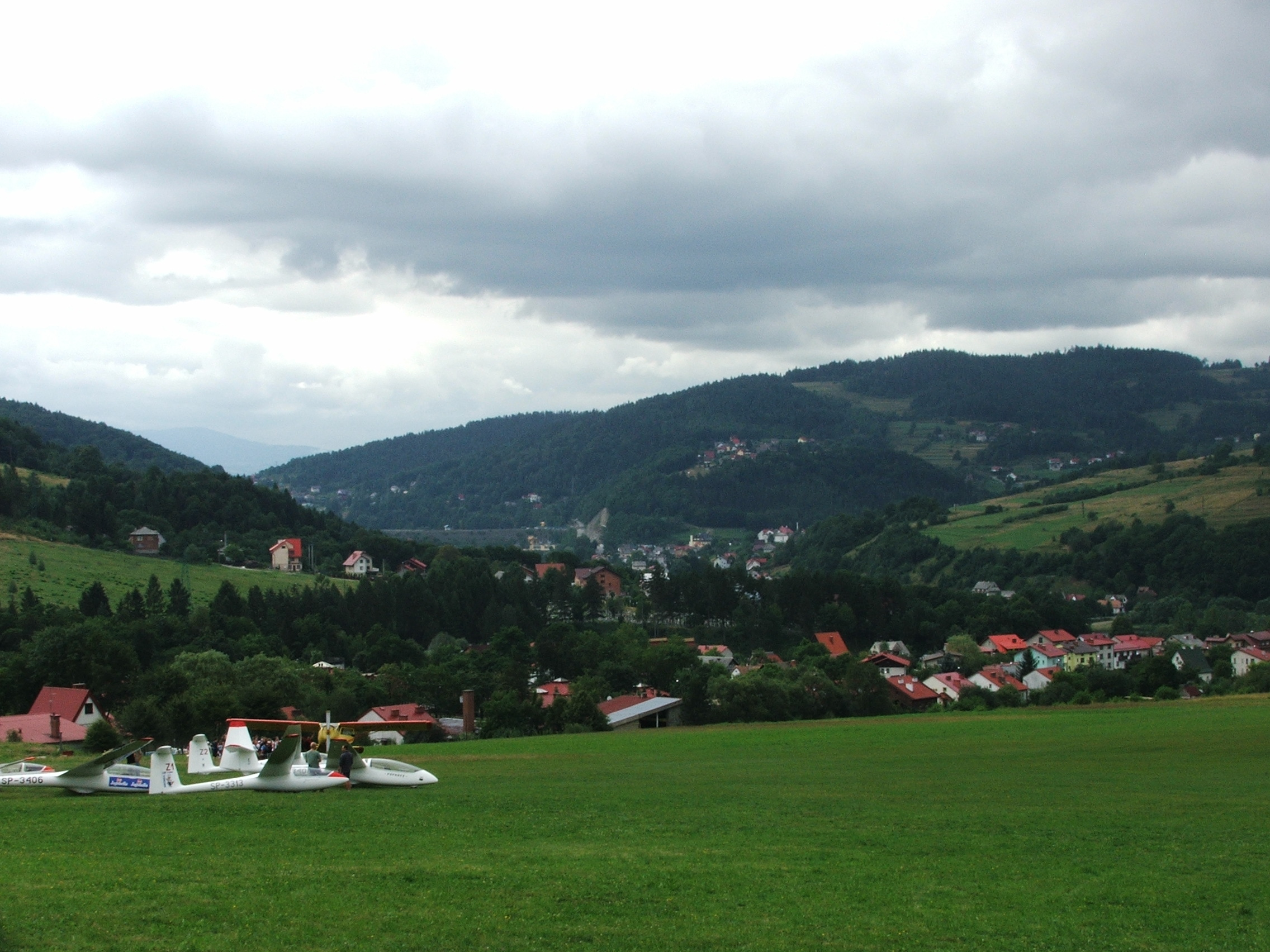
- Międzybrodzie Żywieckie

- Location within Poland
- Coordinates: 49°46′N 19°12′E
- Country: Poland
- Voivodeship: Silesian
- County: Żywiec
- Gmina: Czernichów
- Highest elevation: 760 m (2,490 ft)
- Lowest elevation: 320 m (1,050 ft)
- Population: 1,448

Międzybrodzie Żywieckie [mjɛnd͡zɨˌbrɔd͡ʑɛ ʐɨˈvjɛt͡skʲɛ] is a village in the administrative district of Gmina Czernichów, within Żywiec County, Silesian Voivodeship in southern Poland.
