= Łęki, Oświęcim County =

Łęki
- Village
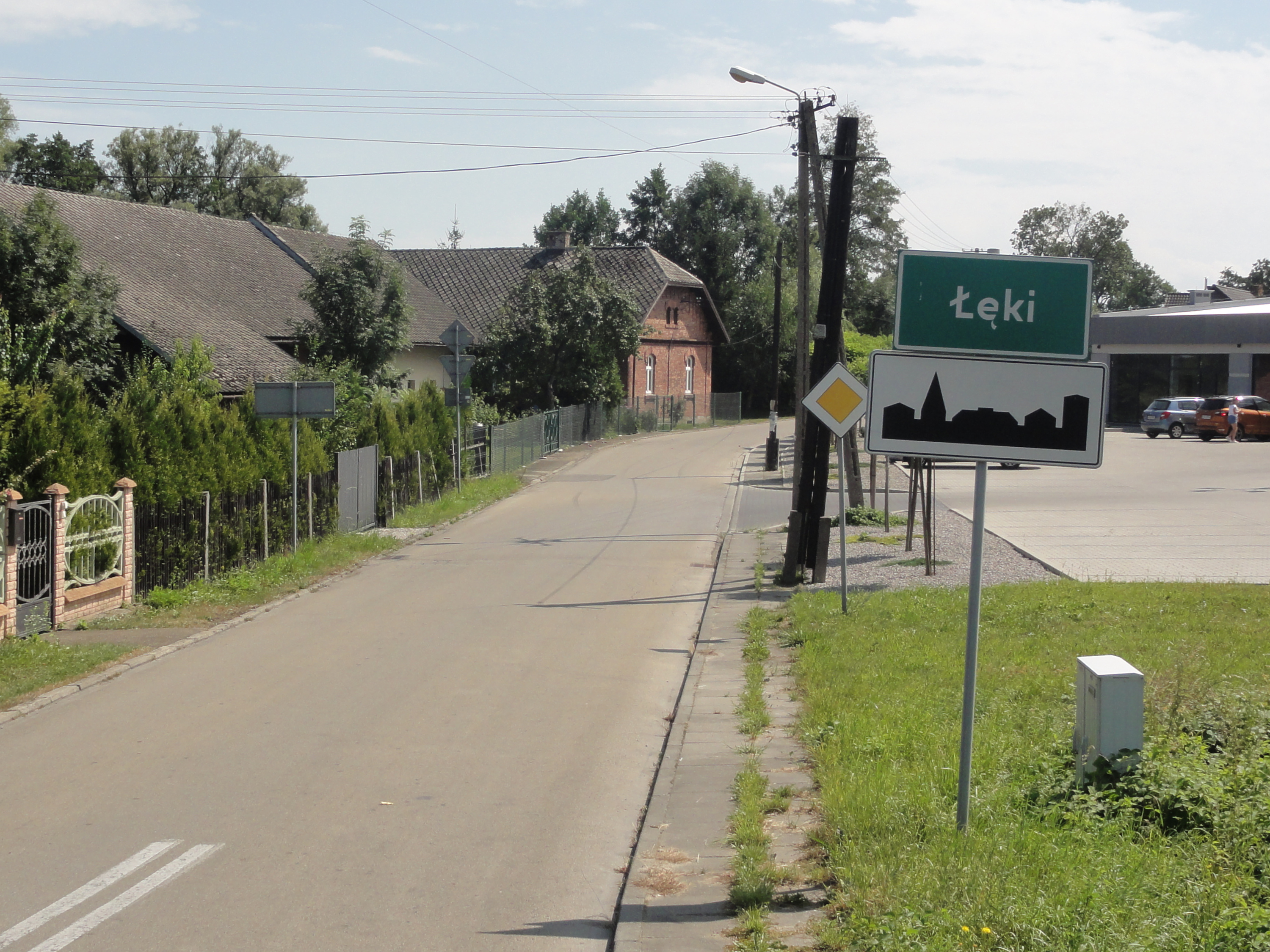

- Location within Poland
- Coordinates: 49°57′N 19°13′E
- Country: Poland
- Voivodeship: Lesser Poland
- County: Oświęcim
- Gmina: Kęty
- First mentioned: 1404
- Population: 1,300

Łęki [ˈwɛŋkʲi] is a village in the administrative district of Gmina Kęty, within Oświęcim County, Lesser Poland Voivodeship, in southern Poland.

== History ==
The village was first mentioned in 1404. It belonged then to the Duchy of Oświęcim, a fee of the Kingdom of Bohemia. In the document of Jan IV of Oświęcim issued on 21 January 1457 in which the duke agreed to sell the Duchy of Oświęcim to the Crown of the Kingdom of Poland the village was mentioned as Lanky.

The territory of the Duchy of Oświęcim was eventually incorporated into Poland in 1564 and formed Silesian County of Kraków Voivodeship. Upon the First Partition of Poland in 1772 it became part of the Austrian Kingdom of Galicia. After World War I and fall of Austria-Hungary it became part of Poland. It was annexed by Nazi Germany at the beginning of World War II, and afterwards it was restored to Poland.
