= Bujaków, Bielsko County =

Bujaków
- Village
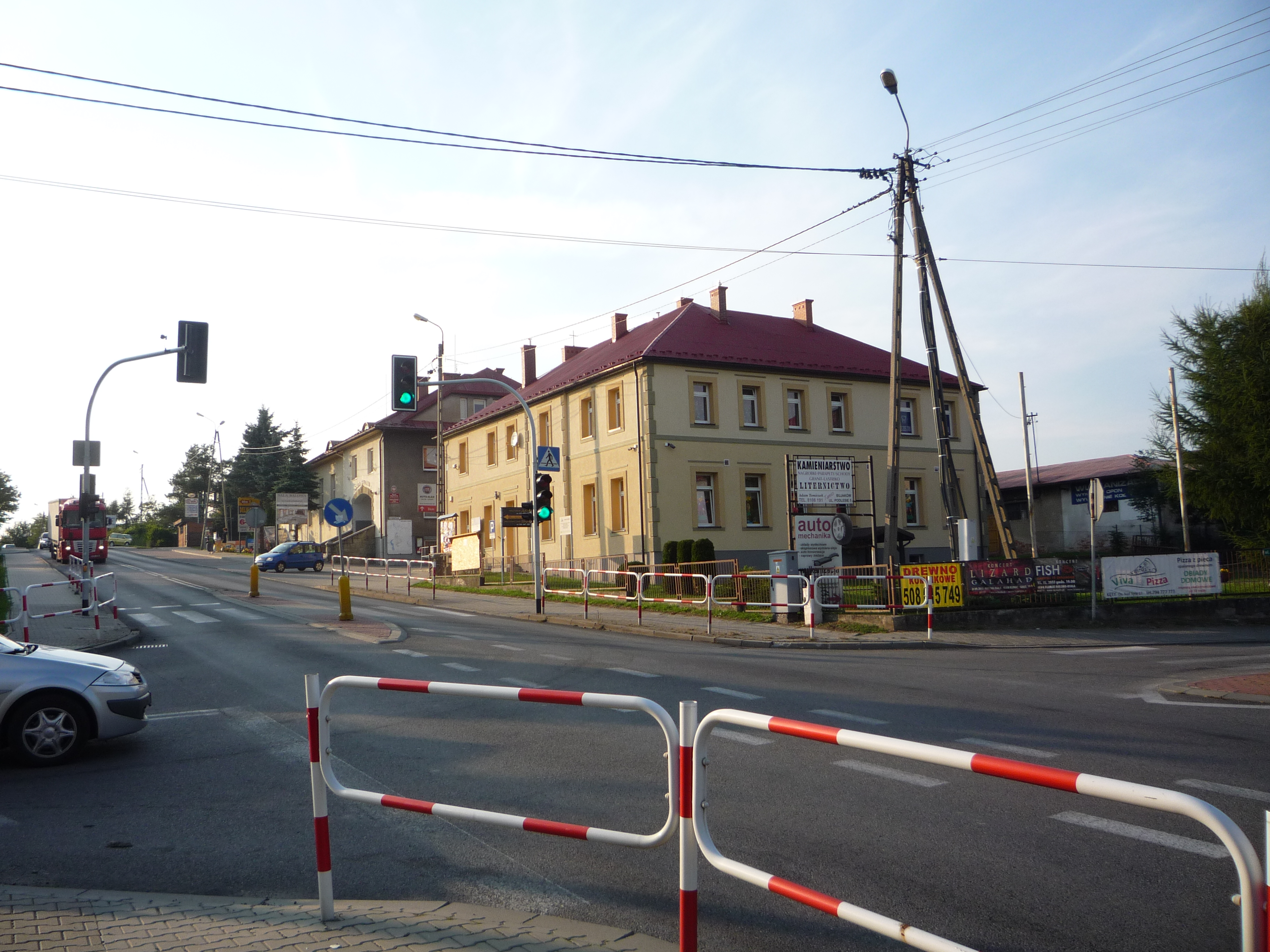
- Village centre

- Location within Poland
- Coordinates: 49°51′N 19°11′E
- Country: Poland
- Voivodeship: Silesian
- County: Bielsko
- Gmina: Porąbka
- First mentioned: 1444
- Elevation: 748 m (2,454 ft)
- Population: 2,176

Bujaków [buˈjakuf] is a village in the administrative district of Gmina Porąbka, within Bielsko County, Silesian Voivodeship, in southern Poland.

== History ==
The village was first mentioned in 1444 as Bujakuov. Politically it belonged then to the Duchy of Oświęcim, a fee of the Kingdom of Bohemia. In 1457 Jan IV of Oświęcim agreed to sell the duchy to the Polish Crown, and in the accompanying document issued on 21 February the village was mentioned as Buyakow.

The territory of the Duchy of Oświęcim was eventually incorporated into Poland in 1564 and formed Silesian County of Kraków Voivodeship. Upon the First Partition of Poland in 1772 it became part of the Austrian Kingdom of Galicia. After World War I and fall of Austria-Hungary it became part of Poland.

Following the 1939 Invasion of Poland, which started World War II, Bujaków was occupied by Nazi Germany and annexed to the German Province of Upper Silesia. The Red Army captured the village on 29 January 1945, ending the Nazi occupation.
