= Tresna =

- Village
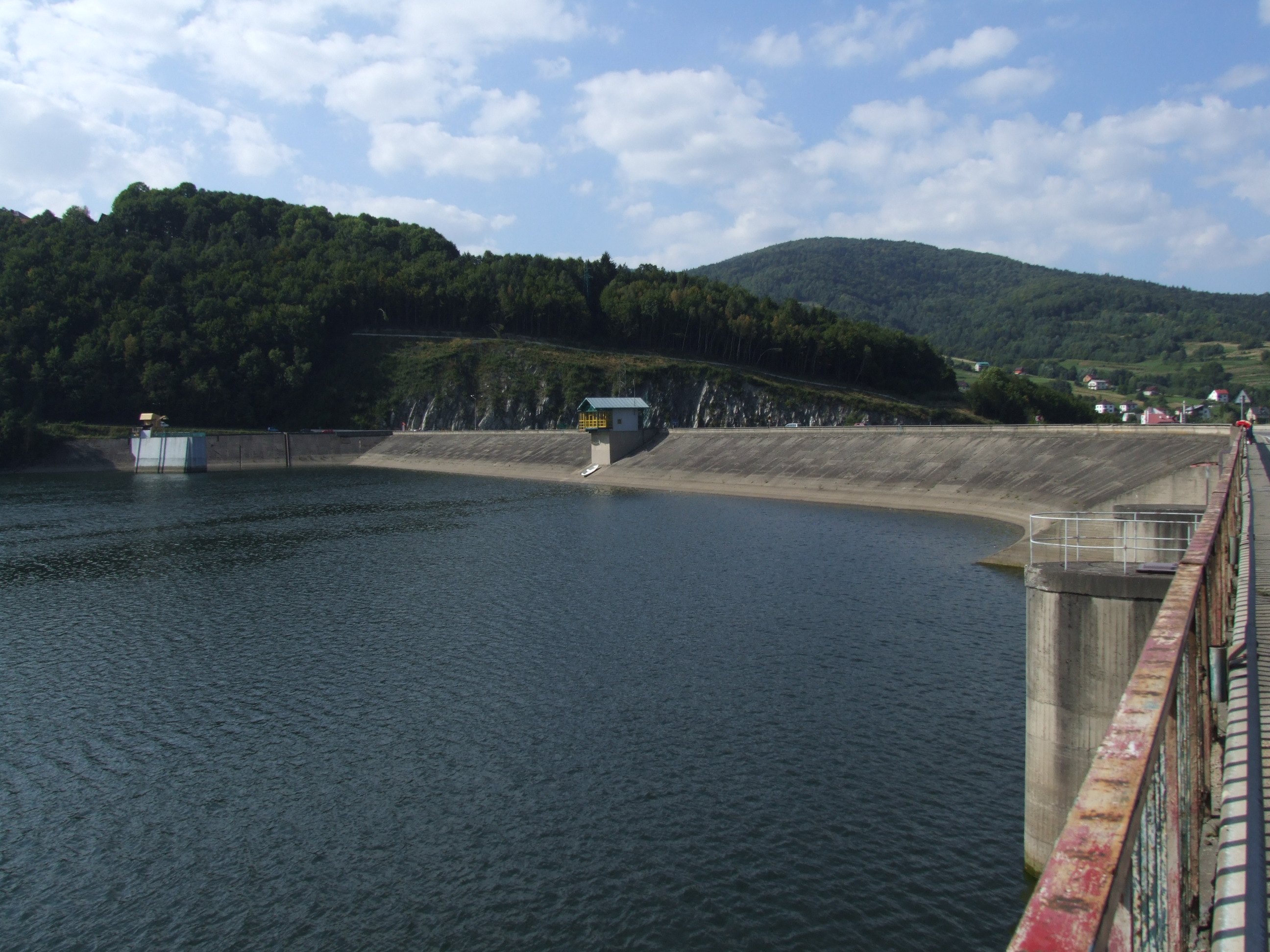
- Dam in Tresna

- Location within Poland
- Coordinates: 49°44′N 19°12′E
- Country: Poland
- Voivodeship: Silesian
- County: Żywiec
- Gmina: Czernichów
- Population: 721

Tresna [ˈtrɛsna] is a village in the administrative district of Gmina Czernichów, within Żywiec County, Silesian Voivodeship, in southern Poland.
