= Nowa Wieś, Oświęcim County =

Nowa Wieś
- Village
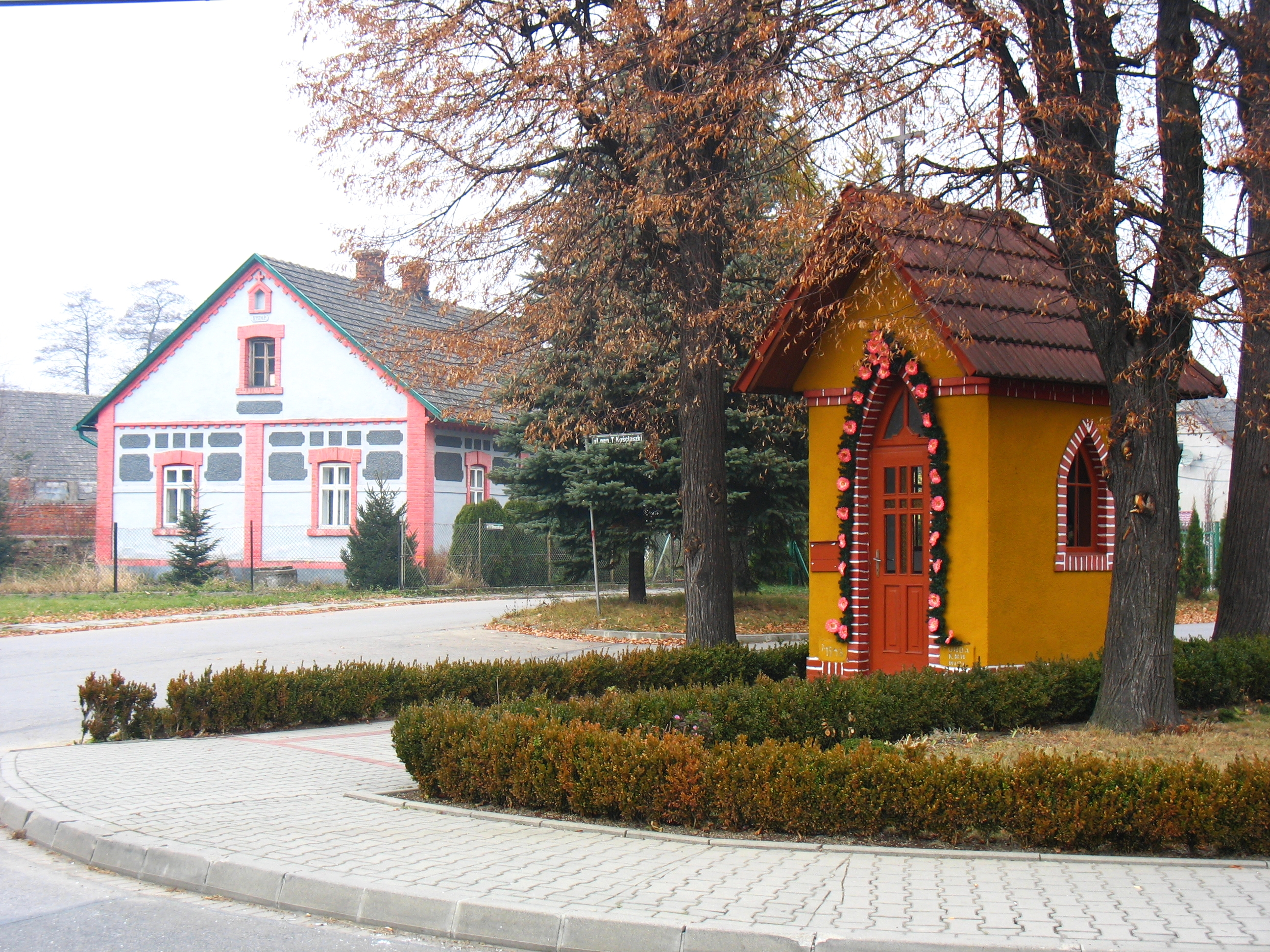
- A chapel in the center

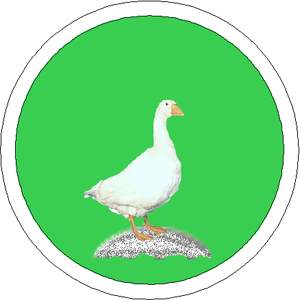
- Coat of arms

- Location within Poland
- Coordinates: 49°54′24″N 19°13′3″E
- Country: Poland
- Voivodeship: Lesser Poland
- County: Oświęcim
- Gmina: Kęty
- First mentioned: 1456
- Elevation: 270 m (890 ft)
- Population: 3,272

Nowa Wieś [ˈnɔva ˈvjɛɕ] (Wymysorys: Füdsdiüf) is a village in the administrative district of Gmina Kęty, within Oświęcim County, Lesser Poland Voivodeship, in southern Poland.

== History ==
The village was first mentioned in 1456. It belonged then to the Duchy of Oświęcim, a fee of the Kingdom of Bohemia. In 1457 Jan IV of Oświęcim agreed to sell the duchy to the Polish Crown, and in the accompanying document issued on 21 February the village was mentioned as Nowa Wyesz.

The territory of the Duchy of Oświęcim was eventually incorporated into Poland in 1564 and formed Silesian County of Kraków Voivodeship. Upon the First Partition of Poland in 1772 it became part of the Austrian Kingdom of Galicia. After World War I and fall of Austria-Hungary it became part of Poland. It was annexed by Nazi Germany at the beginning of World War II, and afterwards it was restored to Poland.
