= Agnes of Zator =

Polish princess

Agnes of Zator (Polish: Agnieszka Zatorska; born c. 1477/80 – died after 1505) was a Polish princess and a member of the Zator branch of the House of Piast.

By virtue of a charter dated in 1492, her father left her as heiress of Wadowice. She married the landowner Jan of Tworków and became a benefactress of the Wadowice church, where she was later buried.

== Life ==
Born between 1477 and 1480, Agnes was the only child of Duke Władysław of Zator (co-ruler of the Duchy of Zator along with his brothers) by his wife Anna, whose origins are unknown. She probably had an illegitimate paternal half-brother, Włodzimierz, a monk at the Benedictine abbey of Tyniec. By virtue of a charter dated 13 July 1492, Agnes received the district of Wadowice as inheritance after her father's death.

Between 1491 and 21 May 1494, Agnes married the magnate Jan of Tworkow, Lord of Kobierzyn (died before 7 August 1504), son of Andrzej of Tworkow by his wife Dorota of Pozdětin i Kokor and member of a branch of the Moravian Beneszowiec family with the right of using the Odrowąż coat of arms. Between 21 and 24 May 1494, she received from her husband the district of Kobierzyn as a dowry, which he sold on 31 May 1496 with her consent. The union produced at least one son, Ernest of Tworkow, who had been the owner of Radunia since 1509.

After her father's death in 1494, Agnes received the district Wadowice as her inheritance according to the previous document signed in 1492, although officially her uncle Jan V assumed the full government over all the Duchy of Zator, which was reunified under his rule. Agnes ruled over Wadowice only as an earthly possession without Ducal power; however, in practice she was called "Sovereign Duchess of Wadowice".

After the death of her husband, in the summer of 1505 Agnes began a legal battle with Piotr Myszkowski of Mirów, Voivode of Łęczyca about the possession of Wadowice. The district legally belonged to her, due to the charter of 1492 in which she received this domain as an inheritance; however, after the death of her father, Władysław, the whole Duchy of Zator was placed under the sovereignty of the Polish King John I Albert and in his right as liege lord of Zator on 23 May 1503, John I's brother and successor King Alexander of Poland granted Wadowice to Piotr Myszkowski as hereditary possession. Agnes fought for her inheritance, but on 7 August 1504 the trial was definitely settled in favor of the Voivode of Łęczyca. This is the last reference of Agnes as a living person; she died most probably in 1505 and was buried in the parish church dedicated to the Virgin Mary in Wadowice, whom she was a benefactress. Agnes' son Ernest of Tworkow was married twice, firstly with Róża Wilczek and secondly with Agnieszka Osinska. He had two sons, Jan and Bartłomiej, after whom the Tworkow family probably became extinct.

== Bibliography ==
- Kazimierz Jasiński, Rodowód Piastów śląskich, vol. II, ed. Avalon, Kraków 2007, ISBN 978-83-60448-28-1, pp. 664–665.
- K. R. Prokop, Agnieszka, [in:] K. Ożóg, S. Szczur (ed.), Piastowie. Leksykon biograficzny, Wydawnictwo Literackie, Kraków 1999, ISBN 83-08-02829-2, s. 826.
- A. Sikorski, Uwagi do genealogii książąt zatorskich, [in:] S. K. Kuczyński (ed.) Rocznik Polskiego Towarzystwa Heraldycznego, vol. III (XIV), ed. DiG, Warsaw 1997, pp. 35–40.
- M. L. Wójcik, Wlodimirus religiosus ordinis beati Benedicti de Tiniec iam profesus. Nieznany syn Włodka, księcia zatorskiego, [in:] I. Panic, J. Sperka (ed.), Średniowiecze polskie i powszechne, vol. 2 (6), Wydawnictwo Uniwersytetu Śląskiego, Katowice 2010, pp. 199–214.
