= Władysław of Zator =

Władysław
- Duke of Zator, Wadowice
- Coat-of-arms of Upper Silesia (Opole, Oświęcim-Zator, etc)
- Born: 1455
- Died: 28 May/21 September 1494
- Noble family: Silesian Piasts of Opole
- Spouse: Anna
- Issue: Agnes of Zator
- Father: Wenceslaus I of Zator
- Mother: Maria Kopczowski

Władysław of Zator (Polish: Władysław Zatorski; 1455 – 28 May/21 September 1494), was a Duke of Zator during 1468–1474 (with his three brothers as co-rulers), ruler over the western half of Zator during 1474–1482 (with his brother as co-ruler) and Duke of Wadowice since 1482 until his death.

He was the fourth and youngest son of Duke Wenceslaus I of Zator by his wife Maria, daughter of Urban Kopczowski, a noblemen from the Duchy of Siewierz.

== Life ==
After his father's death in 1468, Władysław and his brother Jan V were likely minors, so their older brothers Casimir II and Wenceslaus II assumed the government over the Duchy. Władysław's first appearance in the official documents dated from around 1470. Four years later, in 1477, was made the formal division of the Duchy in two parts: Władysław and Jan V took the western part of the Skawa River.

Władysław and Jan V ruled jointly until 1482, when was made the division of their domains. Władysław received a monetary compensation and the town of Wadowice.

Władysław died in 1494, and according to the treaty of mutual inheritance of 1477, his only surviving brother Jan V inherited his lands and with this reunited the whole Duchy of Zator.

== Marriage and issue ==
Before 1488, Władysław married with certain Anna, daughter of Urban Kopczowski (d. aft. 28 May 1494), whose origins are unknown. They had one daughter:

1. Agnes (bef. 1490 – aft. 1505), married before 1504 to Jan Kobierzycki, Count of Tworkow and Kobierzyn.

After Władysław's death, his daughter Agnes inherited Wadowice. She became then the Duchess of Zator. Also known as Agnes of Zator. Her uncles were jealous of her legacy. There are some that say that she and her husband were murdered in order to acquire her legacy.

Władysław of Zator House of Piast Born: 1455 Died: 21 September 1494
Regnal titles
Preceded by Wenceslaus I	Duke of Zator with Casimir II, Wenceslaus II and Jan V 1468–1474	Division of the Duchy
New division	Duke of Zator (1/2) with Jan V 1474–1482	Succeeded by Jan V
