= Duchy of Zator =

Silesian duchy (1445–1513)

Coordinates: 49°59′47″N 19°26′17″E

Duchy of Zator Księstwo Zatorskie (Polish) Herzogtum Zator (German)
- 1445–1564
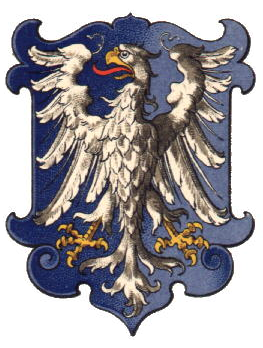
- Coat of arms (19th century)
- Capital: Zator
- Historical era: Middle Ages; Early modern period
  - Partitioned from Oświęcim: 1445
  - Again divided: 1474
  - Re-united: 1490
  - Sold to Poland: 1494
  - Incorporated into Kraków Voivodeship: 1564
  - Seized by Habsburgs (First Partition of Poland): 1772
Preceded by	Succeeded by
Duchy of Oświęcim	Crown of the Kingdom of Poland

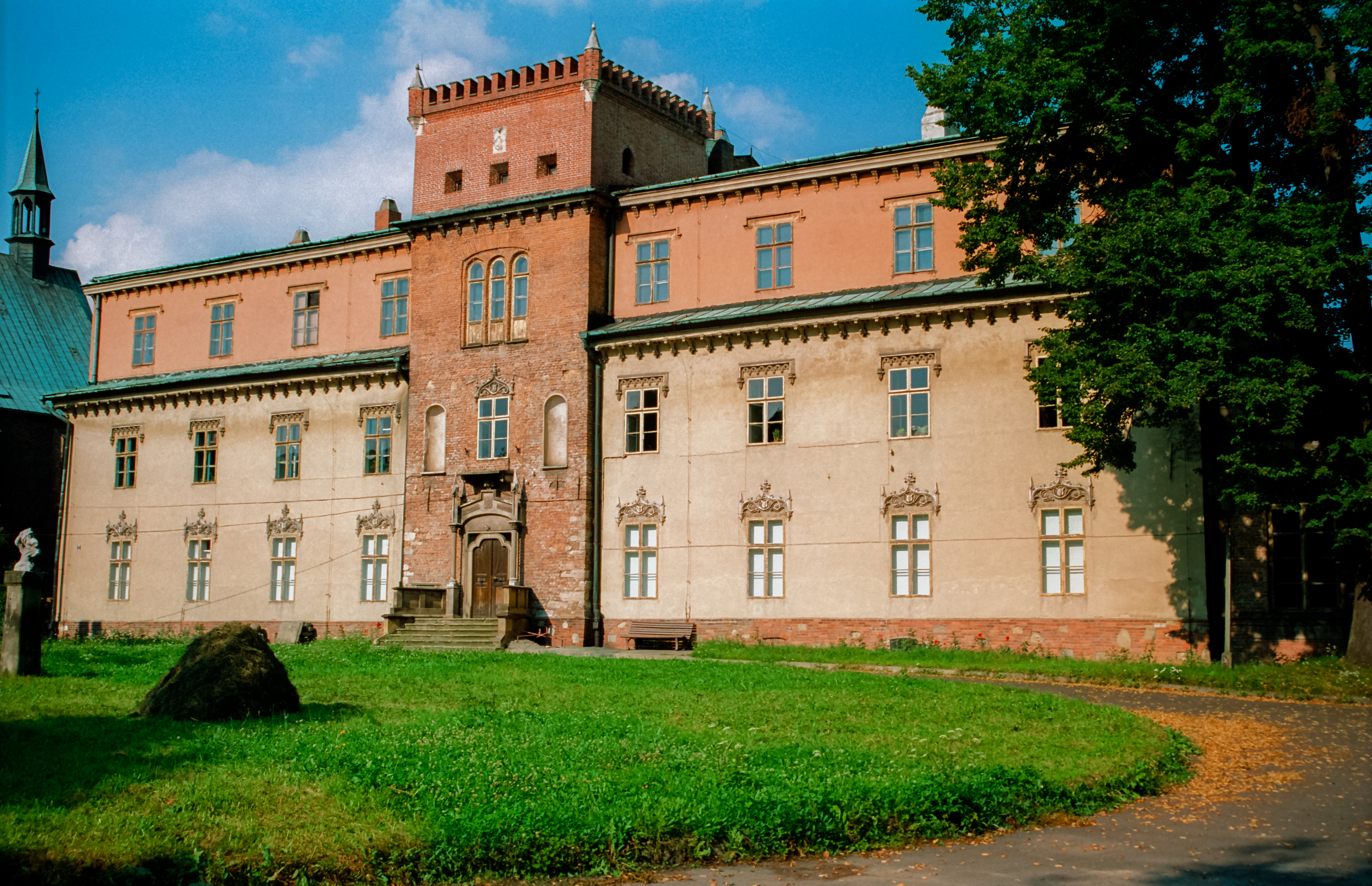
Zator Castle

The Duchy of Zator was a Silesian duchy. It was split off the Duchy of Oświęcim, when after eleven years of joint rule the sons of Duke Casimir I in 1445 finally divided the lands among themselves, whereby his eldest son Wenceslaus received the territory around the town of Zator. The fragmentation of the duchy continued after Wenceslaus' death in 1468, when in 1474 his sons Casimir II and Wenceslaus II as well as Jan V and Władysław again divided the Zator territory in two along the Skawa river.

After the death of Casimir II in 1490 however both parts of the duchy were reunited, and in 1494 Jan V as the last surviving brother became its sole ruler. As Jan himself had no heirs, he decided in the same year to sell the duchy to King John I Albert of Poland, under a guarantee that he would remain duke until his death. Jan was killed in 1513 and Zator was united with Poland. At the General sejm of 1564, King Sigismund II Augustus issued privileges of incorporation recognizing both Duchies of Oświęcim and Zator as part of the Polish Crown into the Silesian County of the Kraków Voivodeship, although the Polish kings retained both ducal titles and the name of the Duchy survived in the legal acts (it had however no special privileges).

The lands of the former Duchy became part of the Habsburg monarchy after the First Partition of Poland in 1772. Though part of Austrian Galicia, Zator and Oświęcim from 1818 to 1866 belonged the German Confederation. Until 1918, the Emperor of Austria also called himself Duke of Zator as a part of his grand title.

When the Second Polish Republic was established in 1918, even the ducal title ceased to exist.

== Dukes of Zator ==
The Dukes of Zator belonged to the Silesian branch of the Piast dynasty (see also Dukes of Silesia).

- 1434–1468 Wenceslaus I
- 1468–1490 Casimir II, from 1474 coregent with his brother
  - 1468–1487 Wenceslaus II
- 1468–1494 Jan V, from 1474 coregent with his brother
  - 1468–1482 Władysław, retired to Wadowice
  - 1493–1503 Agnes, daughter, "Duchess of Wadowice"

Semi-officially from 1494 and officially from 1513 the duchy was part of the Kingdom of Poland.

=== Rulers claiming the title of Duke during Austrian partition of Poland ===
Emperor	Acceded	Deceded
Joseph II	1772	20 February 1790
Leopold II	20 February 1790	1 March 1792
Francis I	1 March 1792	2 March 1835
Ferdinand I	2 March 1835	2 December 1848
Francis Joseph I	2 December 1848	21 November 1916
Charles I	21 November 1916	11 November 1918
