= Laskowa, Oświęcim County =

Laskowa
- Village
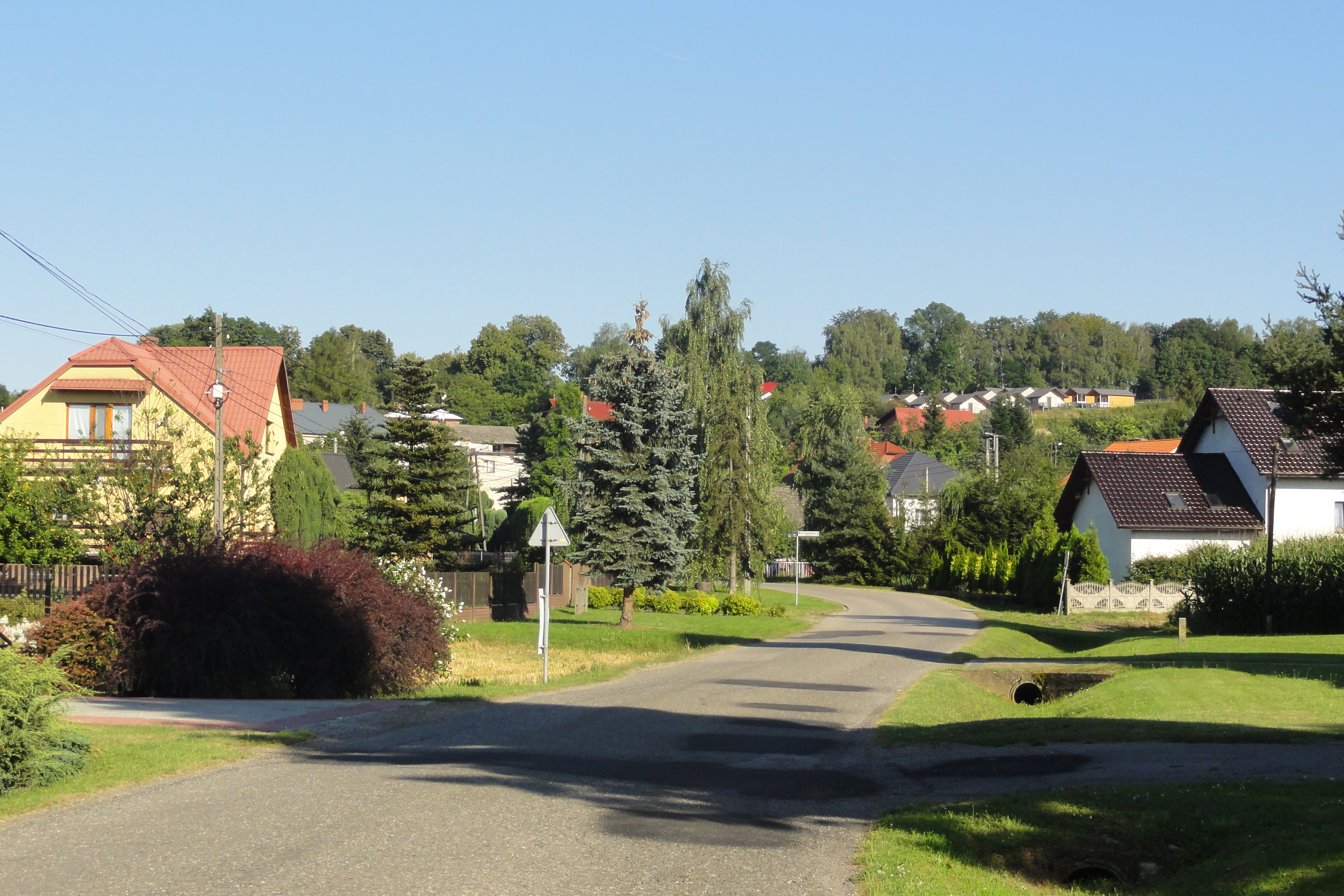

- Location within Poland
- Coordinates: 49°59′N 19°28′E
- Country: Poland
- Voivodeship: Lesser Poland
- County: Oświęcim
- Gmina: Zator
- Highest elevation: 300 m (980 ft)
- Lowest elevation: 250 m (820 ft)
- Population: 445
- Website: http://laskowa.republika.pl/

Laskowa [lasˈkɔva] is a village in the administrative district of Gmina Zator, within Oświęcim County, Lesser Poland Voivodeship, in southern Poland.

In the village there are around 100 fish farming ponds belonging to the Fisheries Experimental Station (Rybackiego Zakładu Doświadczalnego) in Zator. The Młynówka, a distributary of the Skawa River, flows through Laskowa and the surrounding pond area.
