= Wenceslaus II (disambiguation) =

Wenceslaus II may refer to:

- Wenceslaus II of Bohemia
- Wenceslaus II of Legnica
- Wenceslaus II of Zator
- Wenceslaus II, Duke of Bohemia
- Wenceslaus II, Duke of Cieszyn
- Wenceslaus II, Duke of Opava
- Wenceslaus II, Duke of Opava-Ratibor

== See also ==
- Wenceslaus IV of Bohemia, who was Duke Wenceslaus II of Luxembourg
