= Casimir II =

Casimir II may refer to:

- Casimir II the Just (1138–1194), Duke of Cracow and senior prince of Poland
- Casimir II, Duke of Pomerania (after 1130 – 1180), duke of Pomerania-Demmin
- Casimir II, Duke of Cieszyn (ca. 1449 – 1528)
- Casimir II of Zator (ca. 1450 – 1490)
