= Lachówka (river) =

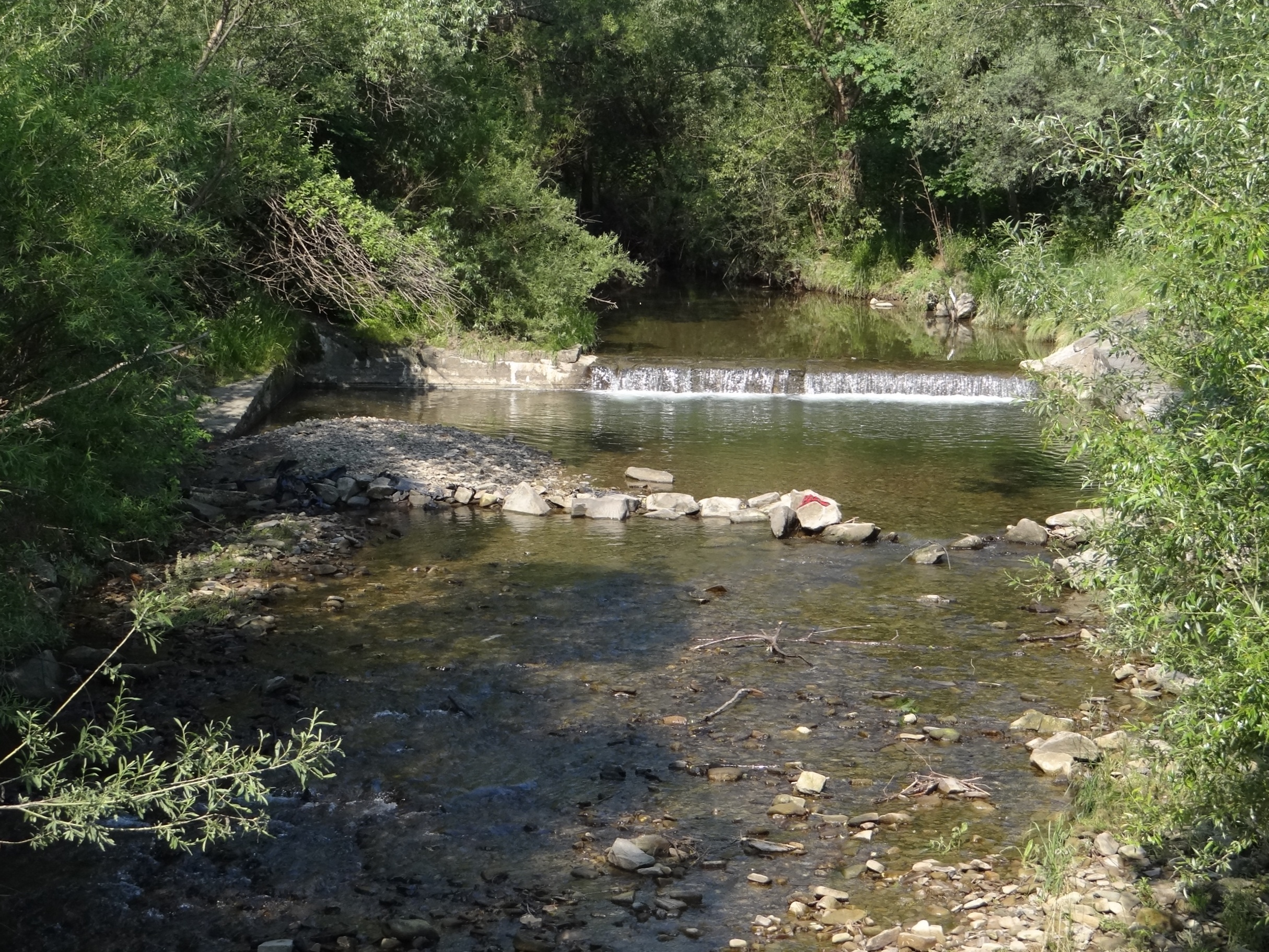

Location
- Country: Poland

Physical characteristics
- Mouth
  - location: Stryszawka
  - coordinates: 49°44′23″N 19°31′50″E

Basin features
- Progression: Stryszawka→ Skawa→ Vistula→ Baltic Sea

Lachówka is a river of Poland, a tributary of the Stryszawka near Stryszawa.
