= Jan V of Zator =

Jan V
- Duke of Zator
- Coat-of-arms of Upper Silesia (Opole, Zator, Toszek, Oświęcim, etc).
- Born: before 1455
- Died: 17 September 1513
- Noble family: Silesian Piasts of Opole
- Spouse: Barbara of Cieszyn
- Issue: (illeg.) Jan
- Father: Wenceslaus I of Zator
- Mother: Maria Kopczowski

Jan V of Zator (Polish: Jan V zatorski; before 1455 – 17 September 1513), was a Duke of Zator during 1468–1474 (with his three brothers as co-rulers), ruler over the western half of Zator from 1474 to 1494 (with his brother Władysław as his co-ruler), and ruler of a reunified duchy from 1494 to his death.

He was the third son of Duke Wenceslaus I of Zator by his wife Maria, daughter of Urban Kopczowski, a noblemen from the Duchy of Siewierz.

== Life ==
At the time of his father's death in 1468, Jan V and his brother Władysław were likely minors, so their older brothers Casimir II and Wenceslaus II assumed the government over the Duchy. The common government of Wenceslaus I's sons lasted until 1474, when was made the formal division of the Duchy in two parts: Jan V, together with Władysław, received the western part of Skawa River.

In 1477, Jan V and his brothers signed an arrangement of mutual inheritance, who permitted the eventual reunion of the whole Duchy of Zator. Despite this, Jan V entered in conversations with Duke Casimir II of Cieszyn, and also signed with him an inheritance treaty. However, this agreement was null because didn't count with the approval of the Dukes of Zator's sovereign, King Casimir IV of Poland.

By 18 May 1477, Jan V married with Barbara (ca. 1452/53 – bef. 12 May 1507), daughter of Duke Bolesław II of Cieszyn and widow of Duke Balthasar of Żagań. They had no children.

In 1482 Jan V and Władysław made the division of their small Duchy between them. Władysław received a monetary compensation and the town of Wadowice, who was ruled by him until his death in 1494.

The deaths of his brothers Wenceslaus II (1487), Casimir II (1490) and Władysław (1494) allowed Jan V to reunificated the whole Duchy of Zator. However, either him or any of his brothers leave legitimate surviving offspring; for this, on 29 July 1494 Jan V sold his land to the Polish King John I Albert for the amount of 80,000 florins. Since then the formal owner of the Duchy was Poland, but Jan V retain his title and owned several properties in the area, were continue to live. As an additional salary, Jan V received 200 fines per year as an income from the salt mines of Wieliczka.

Despite the sell of his lands to the Polish crown, Jan V's position was so strong, that he managed to win an opportunity to renew his homage to the Polish Kings Alexander (in 1501) and Sigismund I the Old (in 1506).

Jan V died on 17 September 1513 in Laskowa after being killed in a duel by the Polish nobleman Wawrzyniec Myszkowski of Spytkowice. According to contemporary accounts, the conflict arose after the duke cut off the water supply to Myszkowski's carp farming ponds in Laskowa, causing substantial financial losses. Jan V was buried in Zator, although it's unknown in which of the parish churches.

Zator was formally annexed to the Polish crown on 26 October of that year, when the Starost of Oświęcim, Andrzej Kościelecki, received from the local nobility the oath of loyalty to the Polish King.

Jan V was survived by an illegitimate son, also called Jan (ca. 1500 – bef. 14 August 1521), who, after the death of his father, was placed under the care of the Starost Kościelecki by orders of King Sigismund I the Old, in whose court Jan was educated. On 18 June 1518 Jan is certified as a guest at the wedding of King Sigismund with Bona Sforza. He probably died some time later, between 1519–1521.

Regnal titles
Preceded by Wenceslaus I	Duke of Zator with Casimir II, Wenceslaus II and Władysław; 1468–1474	Succeeded by Division of the Duchy
Preceded by new creation	Duke of Zator (1/2) with Władysław (until 1482); 1474–1490	Succeeded by Reunification of the Duchy
Preceded by Casimir II	Duke of Zator (1/2); 1490	Succeeded by Reunification of the Duchy
Preceded by —	Duke of Zator; 1490–1513	Succeeded by Annexed by the Kingdom of Poland
