= Gmina Zator =

Gmina Zator Zator Commune
- Gmina
- Coat of arms
- Interactive map of Gmina Zator
- Coordinates (Zator): 49°59′47″N 19°26′17″E
- Country: Poland
- Voivodeship: Lesser Poland
- County: Oświęcim
- Seat: Zator

Area
  - Total: 51.44 km^{2} (19.86 sq mi)

Population (2006)
  - Total: 9,049
  - Density: 175.9/km^{2} (455.6/sq mi)
  - Urban: 3,726
  - Rural: 5,323
- Website: http://www.zator.iap.pl

Gmina Zator is an urban-rural gmina (administrative district) in Oświęcim County, Lesser Poland Voivodeship, in southern Poland. Its seat is the town of Zator, which lies approximately 16 kilometres (10 mi) east of Oświęcim and 37 km (23 mi) west of the regional capital Kraków.

The gmina covers an area of 51.44 square kilometres (19.9 sq mi), and as of 2006 its total population is 9,049 (out of which the population of Zator amounts to 3,726, and the population of the rural part of the gmina is 5,323).

== Villages ==
Apart from the town of Zator, Gmina Zator contains the villages and settlements of Graboszyce, Grodzisko, Laskowa, Łowiczki, Palczowice, Podolsze, Rudze, Smolice and Trzebieńczyce.

== Neighbouring gminas ==
Gmina Zator is bordered by the gminas of Alwernia, Babice, Przeciszów, Spytkowice, Tomice and Wieprz.
