= Wenceslaus I of Zator =

Wenceslaus I
- Duke of Zator, Oświęcim
- Coat-of-arms of Upper Silesia (Opole, Oświęcim, Zator, etc).
- Born: c. 1418
- Died: before 29 July 1468
- Noble family: Silesian Piasts of Opole
- Spouse: Maria Kopczowska
- Issue: Casimir II; Wenceslaus II; Jan V Władysław; Sophie; Katharina; Agnes
- Father: Casimir I of Oświęcim
- Mother: Anna of Żagań

Wenceslaus I of Zator (Polish: Wacław I zatorski; c. 1418 – before 29 July 1468), was a Duke of Oświęcim during 1434–1445 (with his brothers as co-rulers) and Duke of Zator from 1445 until his death.

He was the eldest son of Duke Casimir I of Oświęcim by his first wife Anna, daughter of Duke Henry VIII of Żagań.

== Life ==
At the time of his father's death in 1434 Wenceslaus I was already grown enough to assume the government of the Duchy by himself and to take the guardianship of his younger brothers Przemysław and Jan IV.

For unknown reasons he did not attend the Congress of Będzin on 15 October 1434, where, among other things, were defined the frontiers between Lesser Poland and Silesia; which more surprising that there was present his stepmother Margareta.

However, this doesn't mean that the Dukes of Oświęcim avoided contacts with Poland, as already on 6 October 1438 in Toszek they undertook to consider the Polish King Casimir IV as King of Bohemia, though at least two other Silesian Dukes were also candidates for the throne. Thanks to their support to King Casimir IV, Wenceslaus I and his brothers received the land of Zator.

On 9 February 1440, the castellan Dziersław z Rytwian made a military expedition against the Dukes of Oświęcim, which took place probably due for the treaty of Toszek. The surprise of Wenceslaus I and his brothers was so great that the Polish forces managed to take Zator virtually without resistance. The peace was finally signed on 26 October of that year; under the terms of the peace treaty, Zator returned into the hands of the Dukes of Oświęcim, in return for which Dziersław z Rytwian received the Polish town and fortress of Barwałd. The next step was done on 8 January 1441, when Wenceslaus I was compelled to pay homage to the Polish king and a further diminution of his power in the government on behalf of his younger brothers.

The common rule of Casimir I's sons over Oświęcim lasted until 19 January 1445, when, at the request of Duke Nicholas V of Karniów, the duchy was divided into three separate sections: Jan IV took Oświęcim, Przemysław obtained Toszek and Wenceslaus I received Zator; it is unknown why Wenceslaus I, as the oldest son, didn't receive the main town of the Duchy and obtained the relative small town of Zator.

As a duke of Zator, Wenceslaus I tried to lead a policy of approaching to Poland, despite his still existing ties with the Bohemian Kingdom (he was formally a vassal of Bohemia).

In 1448, Wenceslaus I promised to support the Polish efforts to defend the country's frontiers. Five years later, he and his brother Jan IV privately gave their military services to the king.

The informal relationship between the Duke of Zator and the Polish crown was confirmed in 1456 when Wenceslaus I paid homage to King Casimir IV. This step was made public only in 1462 in the Congress of Głogów.

Wenceslaus I's exact date of death is unknown, but is generally ranked between 1465 and before 29 July 1468. His place of burial is also unknown, but presumably was in the Church of Saint Adalbert and Saint George in Zator.

== Marriage and issue ==
Around 1450 Wenceslaus married with Małgorzata (d. aft. 1468), daughter of Urban Kopczowski called Świrczyna, a noblemen from the Duchy of Siewierz. This information was provided by the chronicler Jan Długosz. Some historians based on Długosz with no reason wrote that her name was Maria. Urban was probably the same person as Urban of Kopczowice (Urban z Kopczowic), mentioned in document form 1457.

According to the chronicler Jan Długosz, this non-dynastic marriage was concluded for love, in an extraordinary exception between the Silesian Dukes and the House of Piast in general. They had seven children:

1. Casimir II (b. ca. 1450 – d. 8 January/7 July 1490)
2. Wenceslaus II (b. ca. 1450/55 – d. bef. 5 October 1487)
3. Jan V (b. bef. 1455 – d. 17 September 1513)
4. Władysław (b. 1455 – d. by 28 May/21 September 1494)
5. Sophie (d. ca. 1466)
6. Katharina (d. ca. 1466)
7. Agnes (d. aft. 21 October 1465).

== Ancestry ==
Ancestors of Wenceslaus I of Zator

16. Casimir I, Duke of Cieszyn
8. Przemyslaus I Noszak, Duke of Cieszyn
17. Euphemia of Czersk-Warsaw
4. Przemysław of Oświęcim
18. Bolesław of Bytom
9. Elisabeth of Koźle-Bytom
19. Margareta of Sternberg
2. Casimir I of Oświęcim
1. Wenceslaus I of Zator
24. Henry IV the Faithful
12. Henry V of Iron
25. Matilda of Brandenburg-Salzwedel
6. Henry VIII the Sparrow
26. Wenceslaus of Płock
13. Anna of Płock
27. Elisabeth of Lithuania
3. Anna of Żagań
28. Bolko II of Opole
14. Vladislaus II of Opole
29. Elisabeth of Świdnica
7. Katharina of Opole
30. András Lackfi, Voivode of Transylvania or Nicolae Alexandru Bassaraba, Voivode of Wallachia
15. Elisabeth

Wenceslaus I of Zator House of Piast Born: c. 1418 Died: before 29 July 1468
Regnal titles
Preceded by Casimir I	Duke of Oświęcim with Przemysław and Jan IV; 1434–1445	Succeeded by Jan IV
Preceded by new creation	Duke of Zator; 1445–1468	Succeeded by Casimir II; Wenceslaus II; Jan V Władysław
