= Graboszyce =

- Village
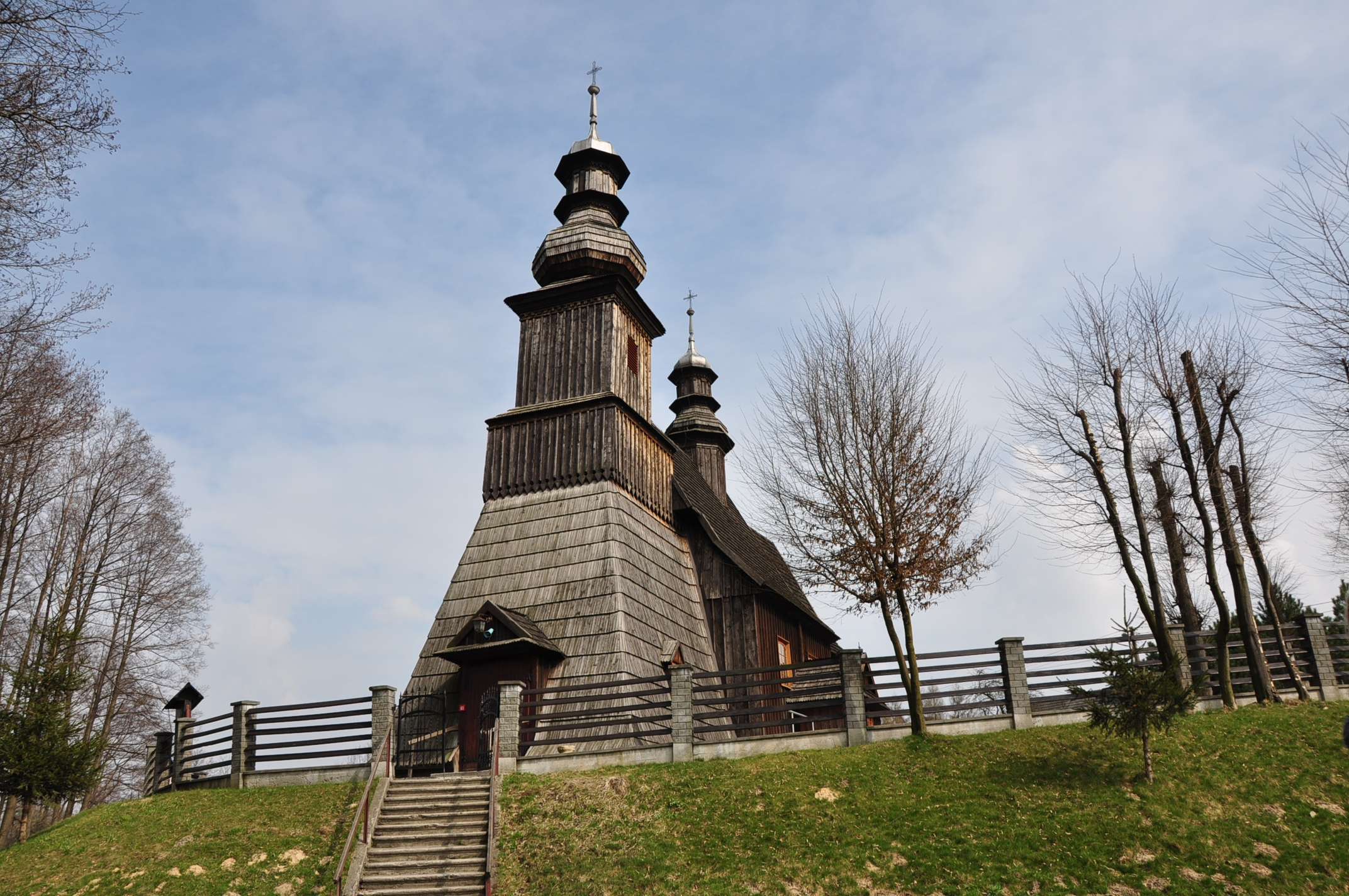
- Saint Andrew church

- Location within Poland
- Coordinates: 49°57′N 19°27′E
- Country: Poland
- Voivodeship: Lesser Poland
- County: Oświęcim
- Gmina: Zator
- Highest elevation: 280 m (920 ft)
- Lowest elevation: 235 m (771 ft)
- Population (approx.): 750

Graboszyce [ɡrabɔˈʂɨt͡sɛ] is a village in the administrative district of Gmina Zator, within Oświęcim County, Lesser Poland Voivodeship, in southern Poland.

The village has an approximate population of 750.

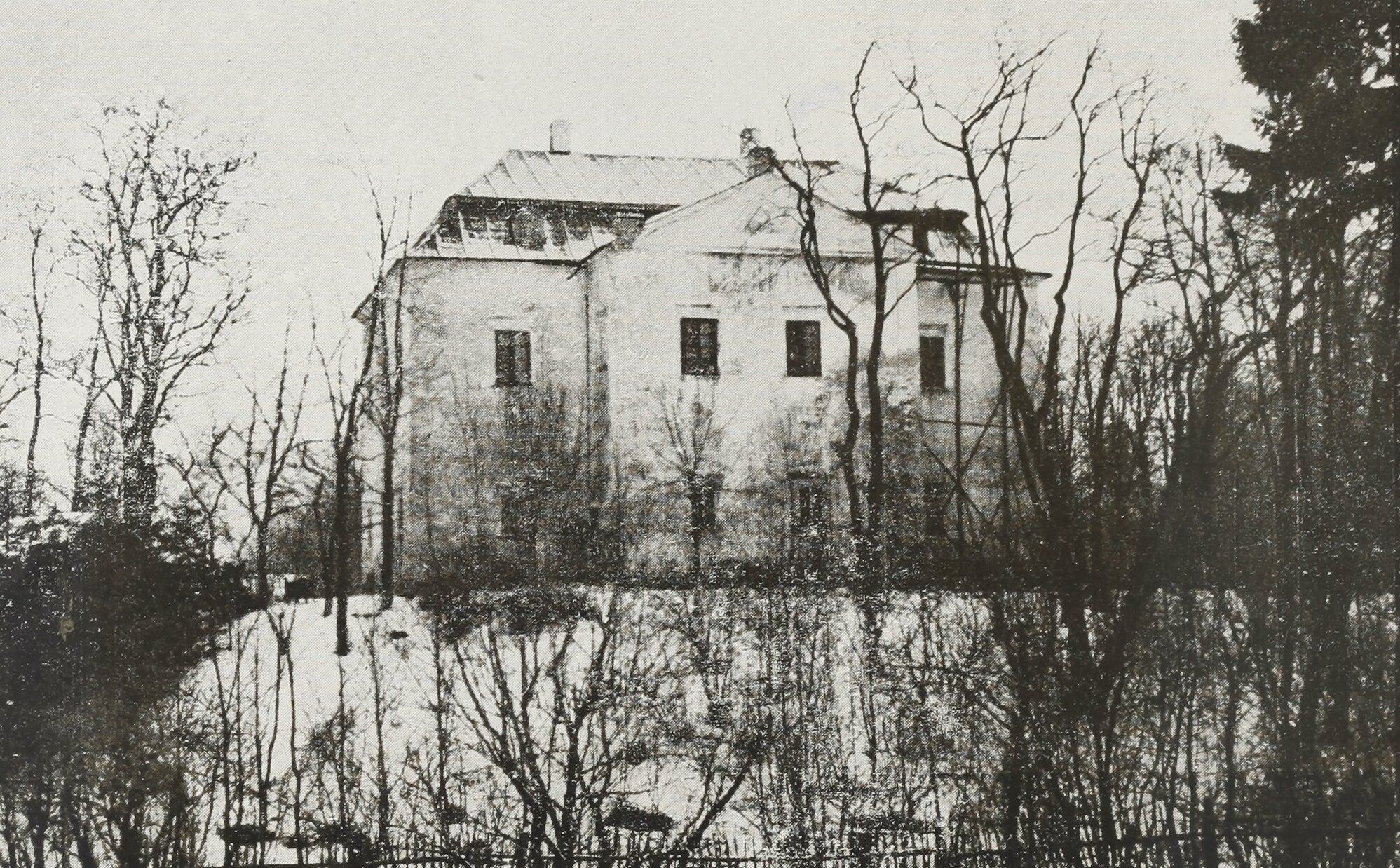
Manor house in Graboszyce before 1930
