= Grodzisko, Lesser Poland Voivodeship =

Grodzisko
- Village
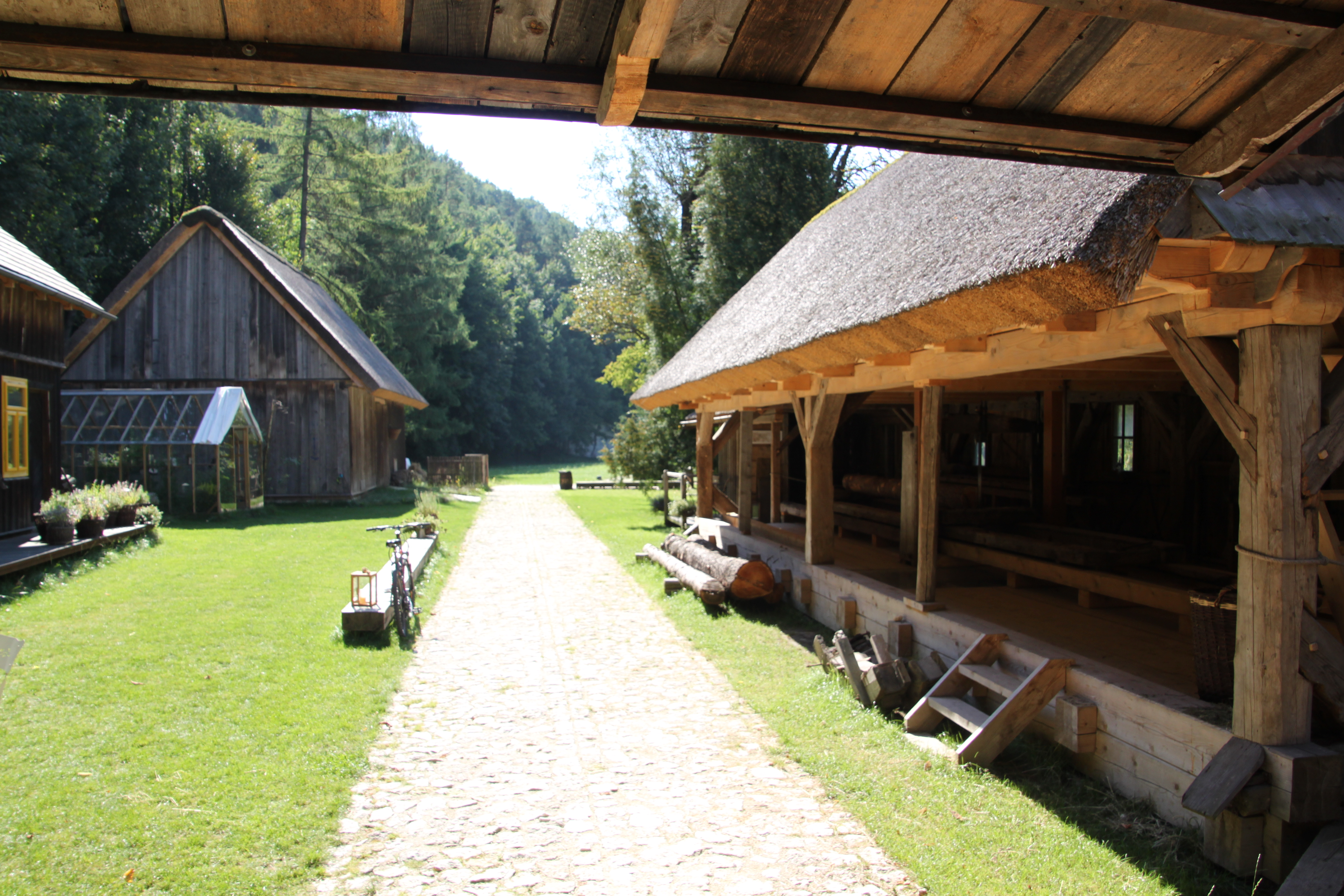
- Watermill in Grodzisko

- Location within Poland
- Coordinates: 49°57′45″N 19°27′34″E
- Country: Poland
- Voivodeship: Lesser Poland
- County: Oświęcim
- Gmina: Zator
- Elevation: 257 m (843 ft)
- Population: 430
- Website: http://www.grodzisko.malopolska.pl

Grodzisko [ɡrɔˈd͡ʑiskɔ] is a village in the administrative district of Gmina Zator, within Oświęcim County, Lesser Poland Voivodeship, in southern Poland.
