= Podolsze =

- Village
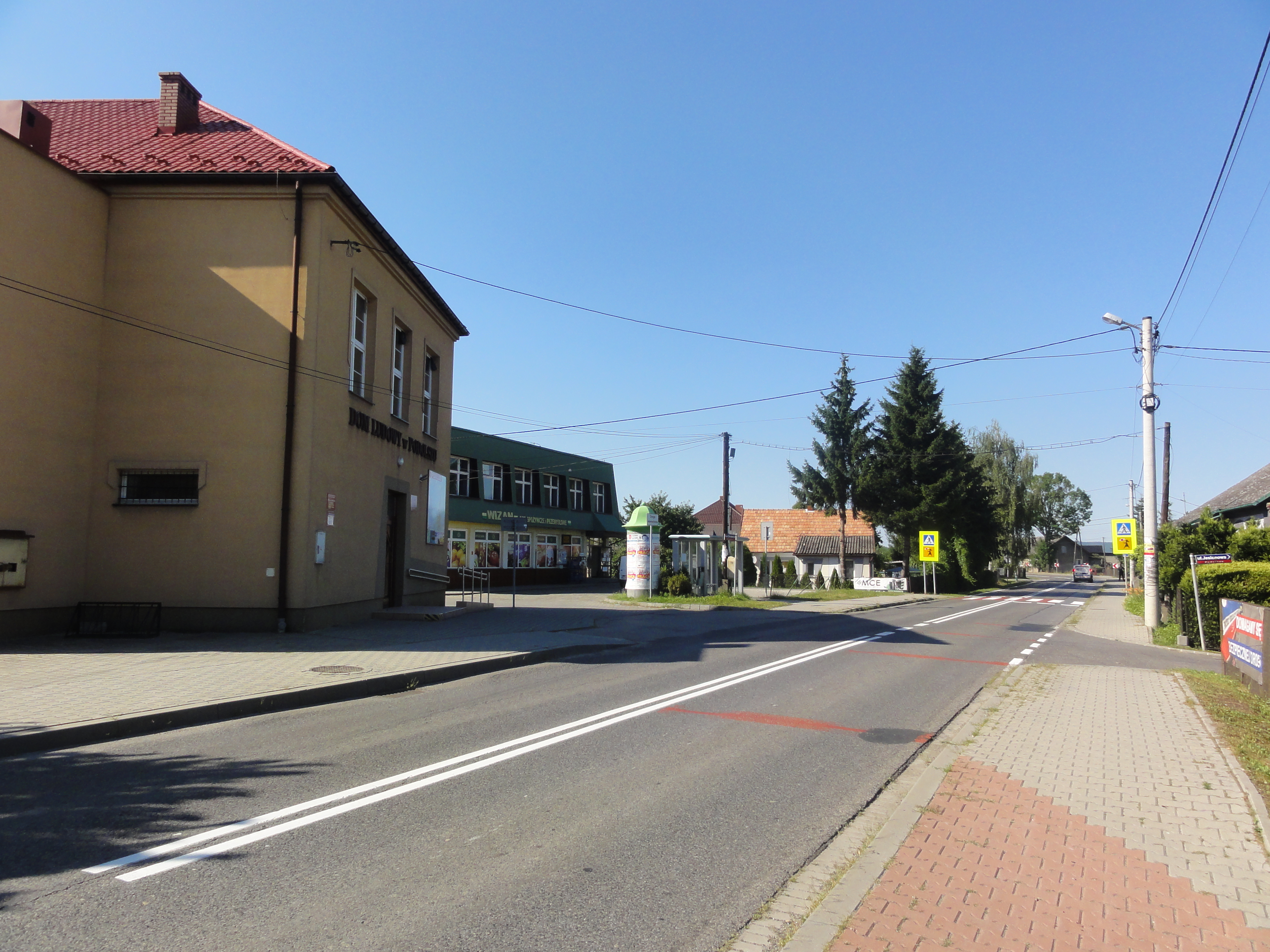

- Location within Poland
- Coordinates: 50°1′N 19°26′E
- Country: Poland
- Voivodeship: Lesser Poland
- County: Oświęcim
- Gmina: Zator
- Elevation: 226 m (741 ft)
- Population: 1,405
- Website: http://www.zator.iap.pl

Podolsze [pɔˈdɔlʂɛ] is a village in the administrative district of Gmina Zator, within Oświęcim County, Lesser Poland Voivodeship, in southern Poland.

The yellow Trail of the Land of Oświęcim Monuments runs through Podolsze, from Zator to Oświęcim. In Podolsze there is a lodging base due to the demand of people coming to the amusement parks in the neighboring city of Zator.
