= Rudze =

- Village
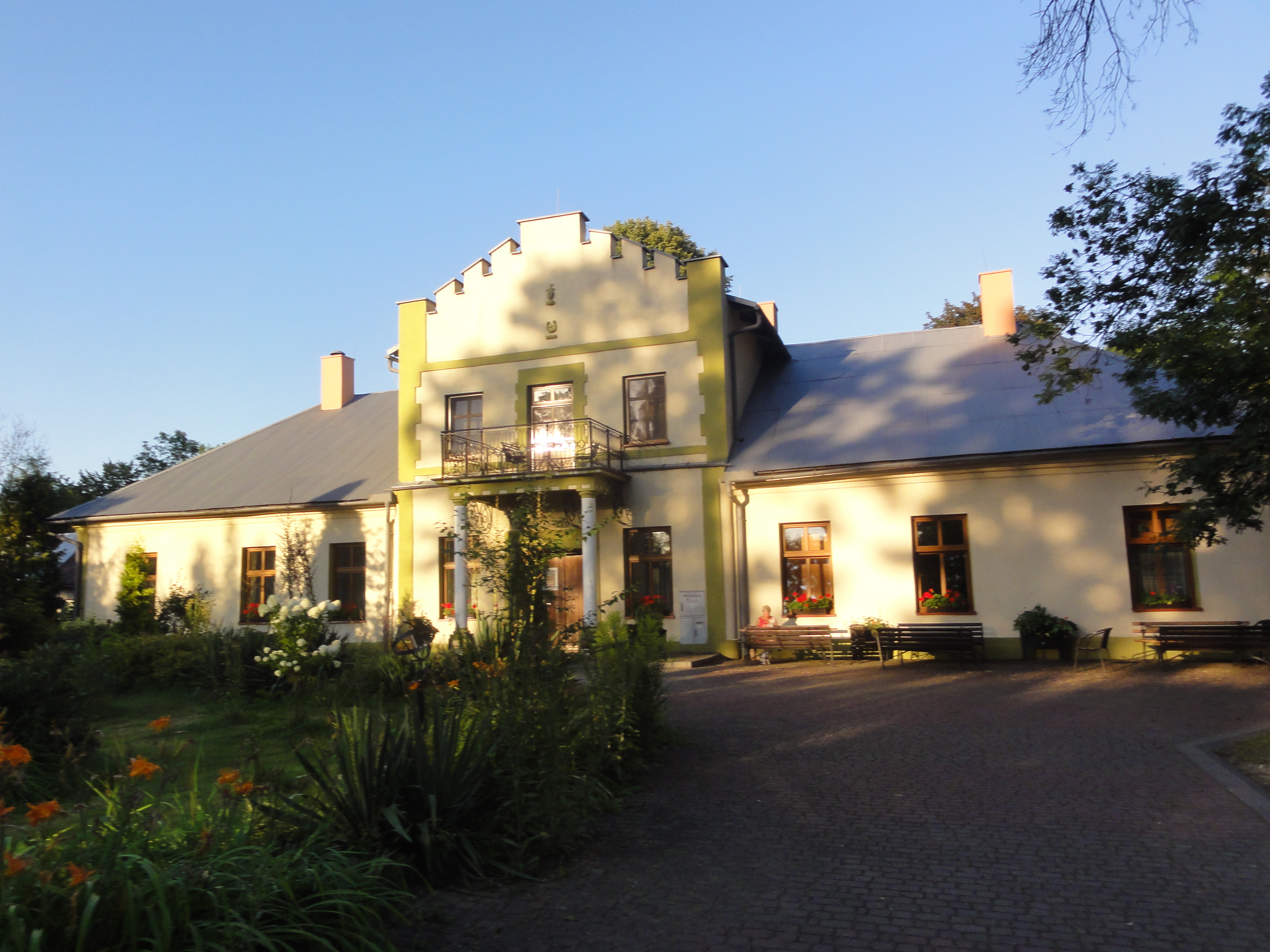
- Manor house

- Location within Poland
- Coordinates: 49°59′N 19°27′E
- Country: Poland
- Voivodeship: Lesser Poland
- County: Oświęcim
- Gmina: Zator

Rudze [ˈrud͡zɛ] is a village in the administrative district of Gmina Zator, within Oświęcim County, Lesser Poland Voivodeship, in southern Poland.
