= Trzebieńczyce =

- Village
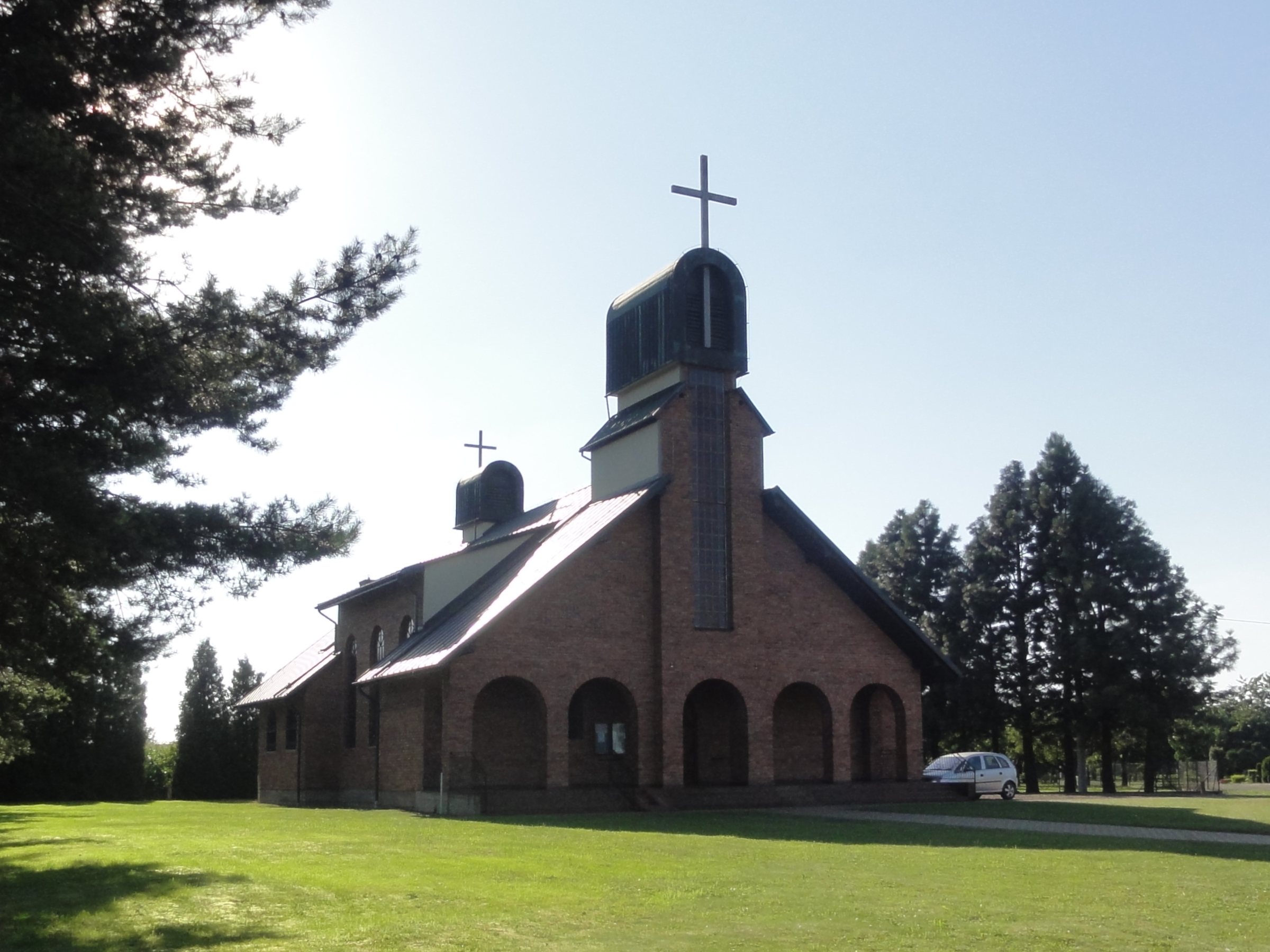
- Chapel of Saint Francis

- Location within Poland
- Coordinates: 49°59′N 19°28′E
- Country: Poland
- Voivodeship: Lesser Poland
- County: Oświęcim
- Gmina: Zator

Trzebieńczyce [tʂɛbjɛɲˈt͡ʂɨt͡sɛ] is a village in the administrative district of Gmina Zator, within Oświęcim County, Lesser Poland Voivodeship, in southern Poland.
