= Wenceslaus II of Zator =

Wenceslaus II
- Duke of Zator
- Coat-of-arms of Upper Silesia (Opole, Oświęcim-Zator, etc)
- Born: 1450/55
- Died: before 5 October 1487
- Noble family: Silesian Piasts of Opole
- Father: Wenceslaus I of Zator
- Mother: Maria Kopczowski

Wenceslaus II of Zator (Polish: Wacław II Zatorski; 1450/55 – before 5 October 1487), was a Duke of Zator during 1468-1474 (with his three brothers as co-rulers), and ruler over the eastern half of Zator from 1474 until his death (with his brother Casimir as co-ruler).

He was the second son of Duke Wenceslaus I of Zator and Maria, daughter of Urban Kopczowski, a noblemen from the Duchy of Siewierz.

== Life ==
After his father's death in 1468, Wenceslaus II and his older brother Casimir II took the full government over the Duchy, because their younger brothers Jan V and Władysław are still minors. However, the main tasks of government were held by Casimir II.

Little is known about Wenceslaus II's life. He appears in the official documents for the first time around 1469. In 1474 was made the formal division of the Duchy of Zator in two parts: Wenceslaus II and Casimir II received the eastern part of the Skawa River.

Wenceslaus II died unmarried and childless between 1484–1487. It's unknown where he was buried.

Regnal titles
Preceded by Wenceslaus I	Duke of Zator with Casimir II, Jan V and Władysław; 1468–1474	Succeeded by Division of the Duchy
Preceded by new creation	Duke of Zator (1/2) with Casimir II; 1474–1487	Succeeded by Casimir II
