= Palczowice =

- Village
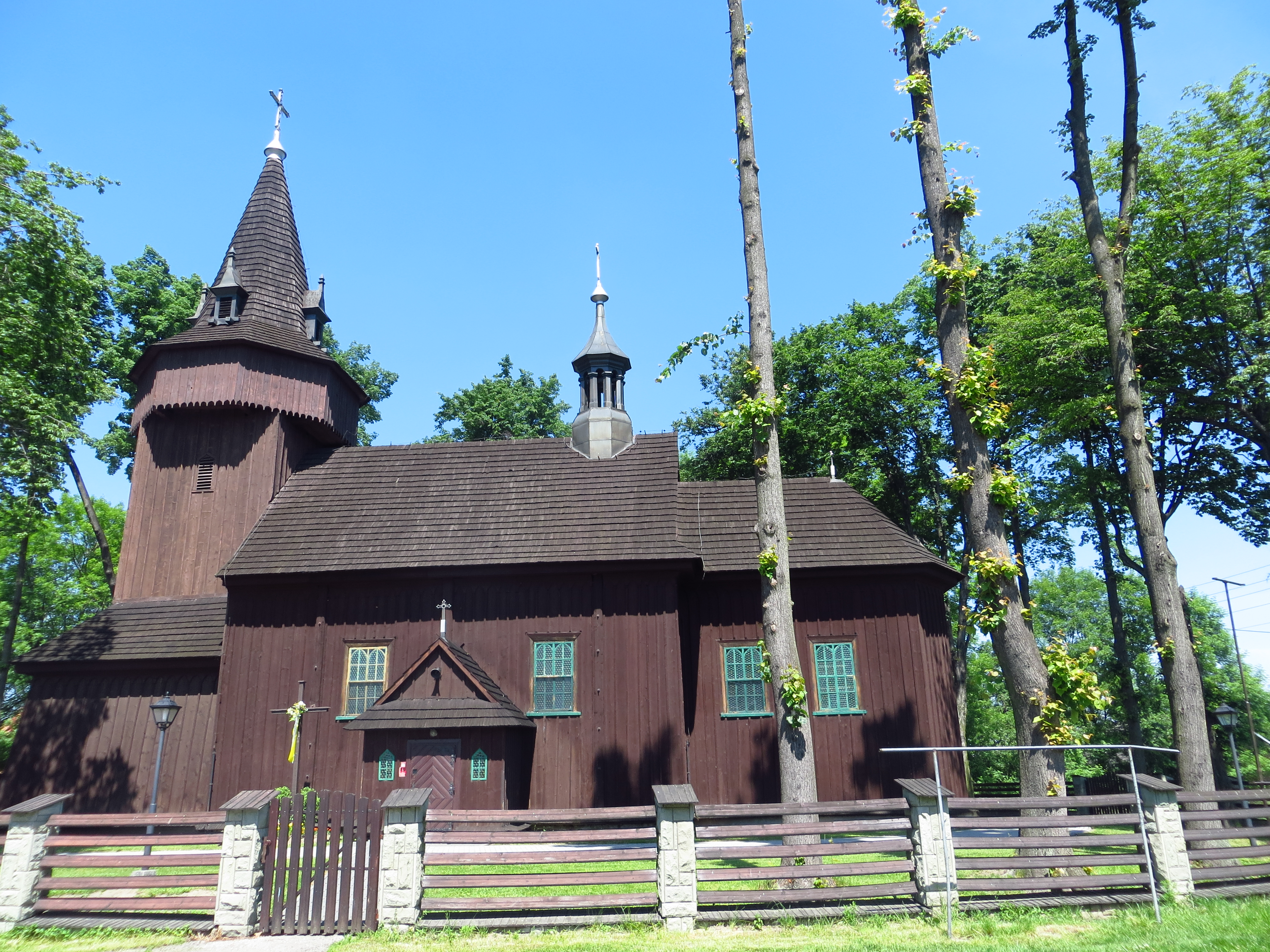
- Wooden church in Palczowice

- Location within Poland
- Coordinates: 50°0′N 19°27′E
- Country: Poland
- Voivodeship: Lesser Poland
- County: Oświęcim
- Gmina: Zator

Palczowice [palt͡ʂɔˈvit͡sɛ] is a village in the administrative district of Gmina Zator, within Oświęcim County, Lesser Poland Voivodeship, in southern Poland.
