= Łowiczki =

- Village
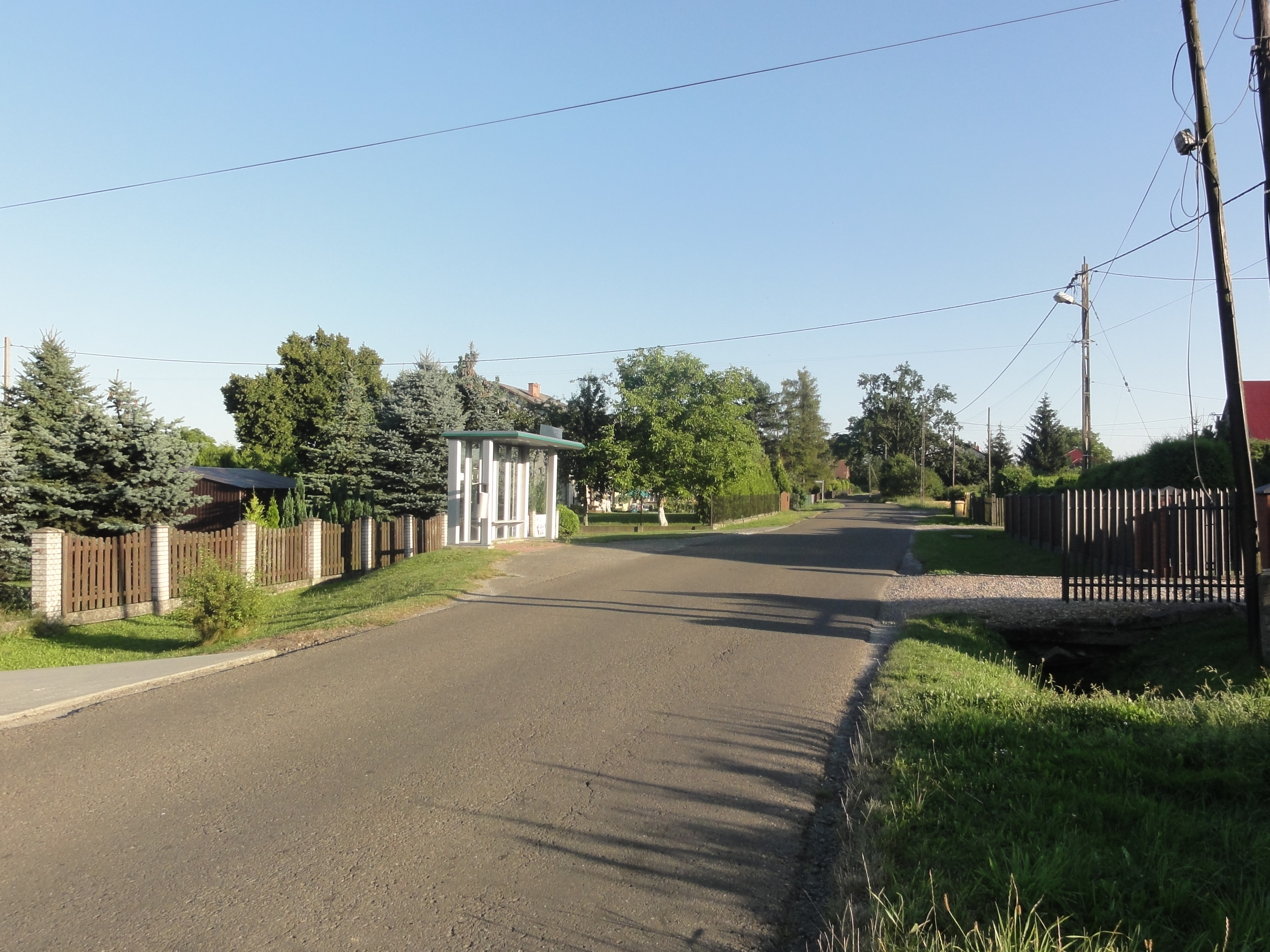

- Location within Poland
- Coordinates: 49°58′19″N 19°24′44″E
- Country: Poland
- Voivodeship: Lesser Poland
- County: Oświęcim
- Gmina: Zator
- Population: 509

Łowiczki [wɔˈvit͡ʂki] is a village in the administrative district of Gmina Zator, within Oświęcim County, Lesser Poland Voivodeship, in southern Poland.
