= Smolice, Lesser Poland Voivodeship =

Smolice
- Village
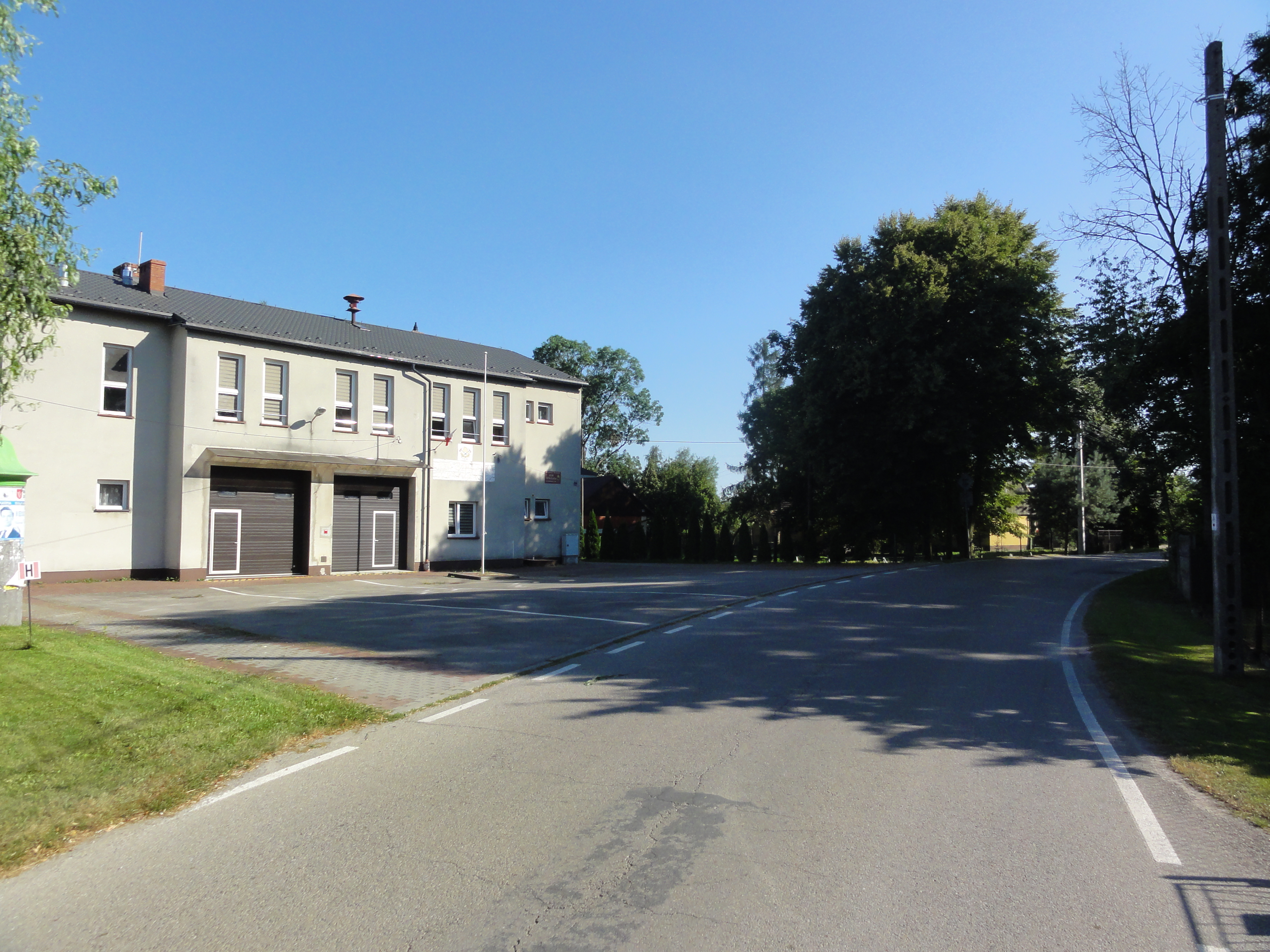

- Location within Poland
- Coordinates: 50°2′N 19°28′E
- Country: Poland
- Voivodeship: Lesser Poland
- County: Oświęcim
- Gmina: Zator

Smolice [smɔˈlit͡sɛ] is a village in the administrative district of Gmina Zator, within Oświęcim County, Lesser Poland Voivodeship, in southern Poland.
