= Casimir II of Zator =

Casimir II
- Duke of Zator
- Coat-of-arms of Upper Silesia (Opole, Oświęcim-Zator, etc)
- Born: c. 1450
- Died: 8 January/7 July 1490
- Noble family: Silesian Piasts of Opole
- Spouse: Margareta/Machna of Krnov
- Issue: Bolko
- Father: Wenceslaus I of Zator
- Mother: Maria Kopczowski

Casimir II of Zator (Polish: Kazimierz II Zatorski; c. 1450 – 8 January/7 July 1490), was a Duke of Zator during 1468–1474 (with his three brothers as co-rulers), and ruler over the eastern half of Zator from 1474 until his death (during 1474–1487 with his brother Wenceslaus as co-ruler).

He was the eldest son of Duke Wenceslaus I of Zator by his wife Maria, daughter of Urban Kopczowski, a noblemen from the Duchy of Siewierz.

== Life ==
After his father's death in 1468, Casimir II and his younger brothers Wenceslaus II, Jan V and Władysław inherited Zator as co-rulers. However, because his younger brothers are minors at that time, only Casimir II and Wenceslaus II ruled the Duchy, although the main tasks of the government were held by Casimir II.

In 1474, under the pressures of his brothers, Casimir II agreed to make the division of the Duchy in two parts: The natural frontier between the lands was the Sakwa River but with the common rule over the capital and use of the Zator castle. Casimir II and his brother Wenceslaus II took the eastern part of Zator. Three years later, in 1477, the brothers signed a treaty of mutual inheritance between them.

Casimir II maintained a close relationship with the Polish King Casimir IV, who was his sovereign The good relations with Poland were also expressed through the financial support of Kraków.

Despite the excellent relations with Poland, after the death of his brother Wenceslaus II in 1487, Casimir II had to secure his rule from the pretensions of Duke Jan V of Racibórz. Only a strong reprimand from King Casimir IV to the Duke of Racibórz, saved Casimir II from the potential loss of his lands.

Casimir II died in 1490 (although the exact date is unknown, but ranked in sources between 8 January and 7 July) and was buried in the Mary's Church of Kraków, which was financially assisted by him. Under the terms of the treaty of 1477, his lands were inherited by his brother Jan V, who reunited all the Duchy of Zator under his rule.

== Marriage and issue ==
Around 12 August 1482, Casimir II married with Margareta (also known as Machna; d. 4 January/28 July 1508), daughter of Duke Nicholas V of Karniów. They had one son:

1. Bolko (after 24 July 1489 – before 21 September 1494).

Casimir II of Zator House of Piast Born: c. 1450 Died: 1490
Regnal titles
Preceded by Wenceslaus I	Duke of Zator with Wenceslaus II, Jan V and Władysław; 1468–1474	Succeeded by Division of the Duchy
Preceded by new creation	Duke of Zator (1/2) with Wenceslaus II (until 1487); 1474–1490	Succeeded by Jan V
