= Skawa =

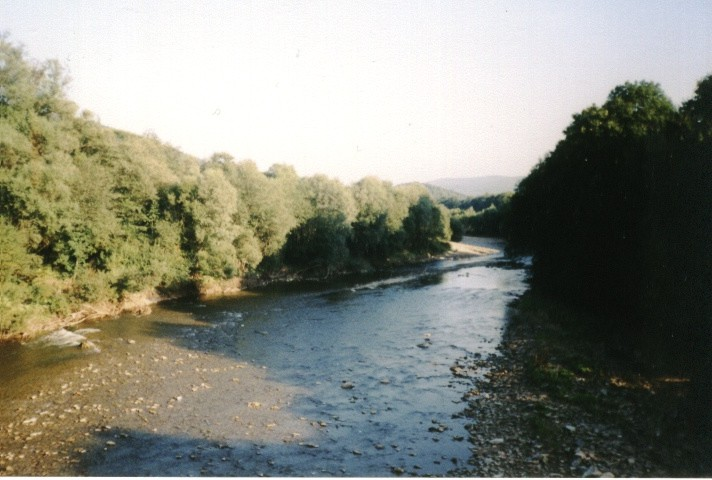
- Skawa near Maków Podhalański

Location
- Country: Poland
- State: Lesser Poland Voivodeship

Physical characteristics
- Source: Spytkowice, Nowy Targ County; 49°34′35″N 19°49′7″E
- Mouth: Vistula at Smolice; 50°1′52″N 19°27′12″E
- Length: 96 km (60 mi)
- Basin size: 1,160 km^{2} (450 sq mi)
- Discharge
  - average: 11.1 m^{3}/s (390 cu ft/s)

Basin features
- Progression: Vistula→ Baltic Sea

The Skawa is a river in southern Poland, a right tributary of the Vistula. Originating in the Western Carpathians (Beskids), the Skawa is 96 kilometres (60 mi) long and drains 1,160 square kilometres (450 sq mi). The several towns it passes along its path include Jordanów, Maków Podhalański, Sucha Beskidzka, Wadowice and Zator. The whole river is located within the territory of Lesser Poland Voivodeship.

Skawa has its source in the Spytkowice Pass, at the height of 700 metres (2,300 ft) above sea level. Since it is a mountain river and causes frequent flooding, its regulation has been a priority for years. A dam was constructed at a village of Świnna Poręba. A reservoir was created, which prevents future floods, and which serves as a source of drinking water for the local population. Skawa flows into the Vistula near the village of Smolice.

== See also ==
- 1934 flood in Poland
