= Lachowice =

- Village
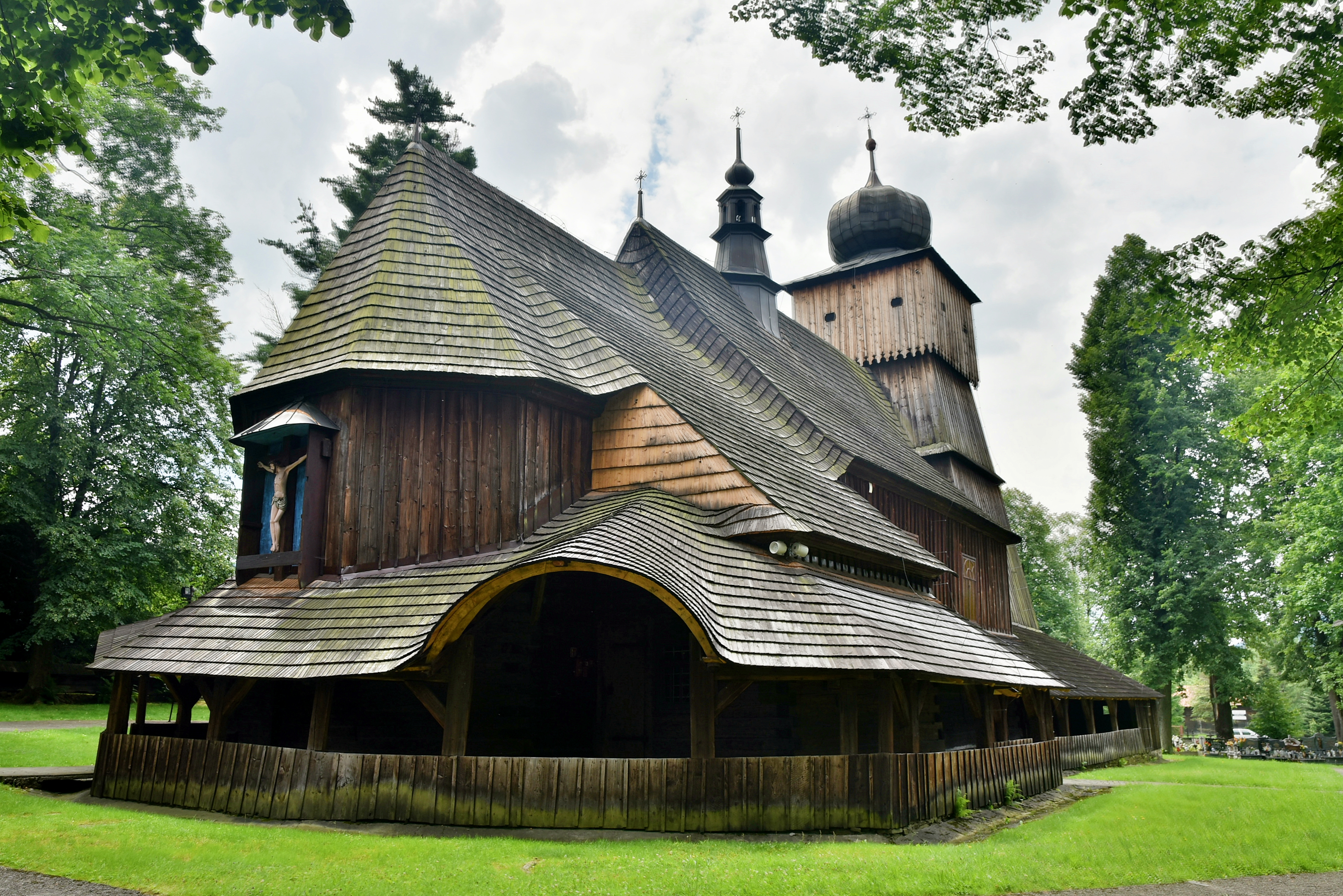
- Saints Peter and Paul church

- Coat of arms

- Location within Poland
- Coordinates: 49°43′N 19°30′E
- Country: Poland
- Voivodeship: Lesser Poland
- County: Sucha
- Gmina: Stryszawa
- First mentioned: 1670
- Highest elevation: 700 m (2,300 ft)
- Lowest elevation: 390 m (1,280 ft)
- Population: 2,200
- Time zone: UTC+1 (CET)
  - Summer (DST): UTC+2
- Postal code: 34-232
- Area code: +4833
- Vehicle registration: KSU

Lachowice [laxɔˈvit͡sɛ] is a village in Sucha County, Lesser Poland Voivodeship, in southern Poland. It is a sołectwo within the administrative district called Gmina Stryszawa.

== Geography ==
The village is located in the western part of the Lesser Poland Voivodeship, close to the border with the Silesian Voivodeship. It is the second biggest village of Gmina Stryszawa. It is situated in the historical Lesser Poland region, between the mountain ranges of Żywiec Beskids and Maków Beskids, in the valley of Lachówka, and is ethnically part of the Goral Lands. It sits in close proximity to the mountains of Zagrodzki Groń, Chrząszczowa Góra, Łopuszniak, Palenica, Opuśniak, Solniska, Jaworzyna, and Góra Wojewodowa. Its neighbouring villages are Stryszawa, Kuków, Kurów, Pewelka, Hucisko, Pewel Wielka, and Koszarawa. The sołectwo of Lachowice has an area of 2,507 hectares (6,190 acres). Its average elevation is 450 m (1,480 ft) above sea level.

=== Integral parts ===
According to the National Register of Geographical Names for 2025, the village of Lachowice had 39 integral parts, divided into:

- 5 settlements (osada wsi): Krale, Laliki, Mączne, Zagrody, Zagródki
- 6 hamlets (przysiółek wsi): Dudziakówka, Granica, Podgronie, Polanki, Rumiaków, Zawodzie
- 28 parts of the village (część wsi): Adamy, Banasie, Bogacze, Buczynka, Chrząszczówka, Elżbieciakówka, Gustawy, Kachlówka, Kalówka, Kapałów Potok, Karczówka, Karówka, Kotliny, Krzystki, Kubińce, Lasiki, Łaciaki, Mącznianka, Mizioły, Pająkówka, Pierchałówka, Pisiak, Sobalówka, Sobańskie, Świerkoszówka, U Grzesicy, Wojtaszki, Zagrody

== Etymology ==
The name Lachowice was first recorded in 1670. Because of the name's similarity to the Polish surname Lach or the term Lachy, historically used to describe Polish people, it was suggested that the name came from Polish farmers who settled here in the 17th century. However, evidence points instead to the name having Vlach origin.

Vlachs settled the area of Lachowice in the 15th century. Before the village was formed, the area consisted of small settlements: Mączne, Kobylanka, and Lubnica—the latter having Balkan roots. Despite the influx of Polish settlers in the 17th century, it is unlikely that they would have rapidly replaced established Vlach names. Similar toponyms in Slovakia and Ukraine support the idea that the name Lachowice arrived with Vlach settlers from Spiš and Orava.

== History ==
=== Village's origins ===
The origins of the village of Lachowice date back to the 13th and 14th centuries, when settlers from Silesia and Kraków arrived in the region surrounding Babia Góra. The first settlers in the area of modern Lachowice were Vlachs, who came here in either the 15th or the 16th century. The village was established in the 17th century by Piotr Komorowski, owner of the castle in Sucha Beskidzka, through the consolidation of four settlements: Kobylanka, Lubnica, Lachowice, and Mączna. Lachowice was a part of the Sucha Beskidzka latifundium, later owned by the Wielopolski, Branicki, and Tarnowski families.

The first mention of Kobylanka, a shepherd hamlet, was recorded in 1598, and the first mention of Lubnica was in 1608. The name Lachowice was first recorded in 1670. Aside from farmers and shepherds, people of the village also practiced handicrafts, selling them at markets in Żywiec, Maków Podhalański, and Sucha Beskidzka. In the 18th century, the residents worked in fulling mills. There was a Jewish minority in Lachowice, which owned several local inns. Anna of Lubomierz established a folwark in the village.

The earliest known surnames of residents of Lachowice, recorded in the years 1699–1757 in court documents, were: Banasik, Barzycak, Chrząszcz, Ćwiertnia, Dyduch, Grzesica, Gustof, Karcz, Kral, Krzystek, Lalik, Młyński, Pająk, Pochopień, Porzycki, Sikora, Sobański, Starczała, Ślusarczyk, Świerkosz, Targosz, Trzop, Wątroba.

=== Austrian Partition ===
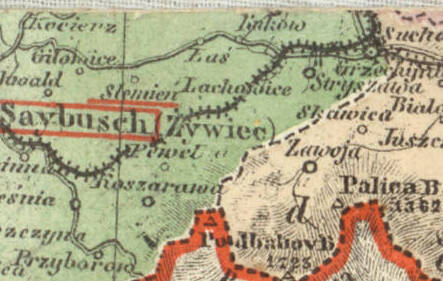
Lachowice on an 1895 map of the Kingdom of Galicia and Lodomeria

Following the first partition of Poland in 1772, Lachowice was annexed by the Habsburg Empire, and remained in Austrian Galicia until 1918. In 1834, a forestry department was built in Lachowice, and the local Catholic parish was established in 1841. Lachowice was a centre of resistance during the Galician Peasant Uprising of 1846. In the years 1846–1847, typhus and cholera epidemics, as well as famine, claimed the lives of 492 of the village's residents. On 16 December 1884, the railway line running through Lachowice was opened.

The first stone houses in the village were constructed in the 19th century. An elementary school was established. In the late 19th century, people of the village took on toymaking as a source of supplementary income. Their products were sold in Kraków, Poznań, and in the Kresy.

On 31 December 1910, 2314 people lived in the village, and the local estate was owned by Władysław Michał Branicki. During the First World War, men from Lachowice served in the Austro-Hungarian Army. On 9 September 1914, Michał Świertnia from Lachowice, found guilty of lèse-majesté, was sentenced to death. In November 1914, the Austrian army forcibly bought up hay and outs in the village, and legionnaires stationed in Sucha Beskidzka confiscated cows from local farmers. The Austro-Hungarian government settled war refugees from the eastern regions of the country, occupied by the Russians, in Lachowice. On 15 and 16 April 1916, as a result of heavy snowstorms, forests near Lachowice were almost completely destroyed.

=== Second Polish Republic ===
Following the end of the First World War, Lachowice became a part of the Second Polish Republic. It belonged to Żywiec County of Kraków Voivodeship. Since 1 January 1924, it belonged to Maków County. On 1 April 1932, it was incorporated back into Żywiec County.

A 25 September 1927 issue of the Piast weekly magazine reported on the results of recent local council elections of Lachowice. Most of the elected individuals were members of the Polish People's Party "Piast": Piotr Dyduch, Michał Chrząszcz, Marcin Kąkoł, Józef Kubleniec, Władysław Dyduch, Jan Dyduch, Izydor Bogacz, Józef Świerkosz. During the Great Depression, some residents of the village emigrated to work abroad, mostly to the United States.

=== World War II ===
The village was occupied by Nazi Germany following the invasion of Poland in 1939, which marked the beginning of World War II. It was incorporated into the Province of Silesia (later in the Province of Upper Silesia). The Nazi administration introduced a new, German name for the village—Lachowitz. Later, the name was changed to Lachenwald.

The first deportations of Polish people of Lachowice in the so-called Action Saybusch, conducted by the Wehrmacht and Gestapo, took place on 26 September 1940. In total, 521 people (92 families) were deported then. They were transported to Sucha Beskidzka together with people from Stryszawa, then by train to Łódź, after which they were dispersed to various places in the General Government and the Third Reich.

The second deportation took place in October 1940. The third one, of 21 people (6 families), was conducted on 10 November 1940. 27 German families (123 people) from Stryj were settled in Lachowice on 26 November 1940. Later German settlers came from Bukovina and Romania. The Poles who remained in Lachowice were obliged to work for German settlers.

Abandoned houses in the village were blown up, demolished, or converted into stables. 69 houses were destroyed, 34 were damaged, and 7 burned down. Three residents of Lachowice were killed in the Auschwitz concentration camp, five were shot, three died fighting at the front, and four were deported to Germany for forced labor.

On 30 January 1945, the village was captured by the Soviet Red Army. Soviet soldiers committed theft of the local population's belongings, food supplies, livestock, and farming equipment.

=== Modern Poland ===
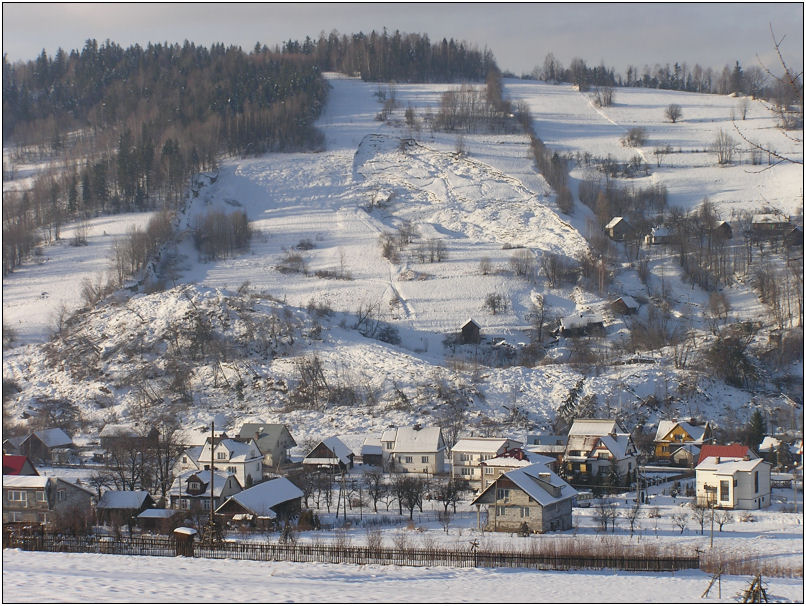
Destructions caused by the 2001 landslide

After the end of the Second World War, some residents of Lachowice left the village and settled in the Recovered Territories. The village became a part of Kraków Voivodeship. From 1954 until 1973, Lachowice was the seat of a local gromada (the lowest tier of local government). On 1 January 1956, it was transferred from Żywiec County to newly established Sucha County. In the years 1975–1998, it belonged to Bielsko Voivodeship. Since 1999, it is in Lesser Poland Voivodeship.

In 1965, a new school building was raised. In 1978, a tourist shelter was opened in Lachowice. On 27 July 2001, a landslide caused by heavy rainfall damaged several houses in the village. Twelve houses were completely destroyed. In addition to Polish institutions, the affected families received aid from the Prince of Liechtenstein and the government of Germany. A historic mill burned down on 15 April 2002.

== Transport ==
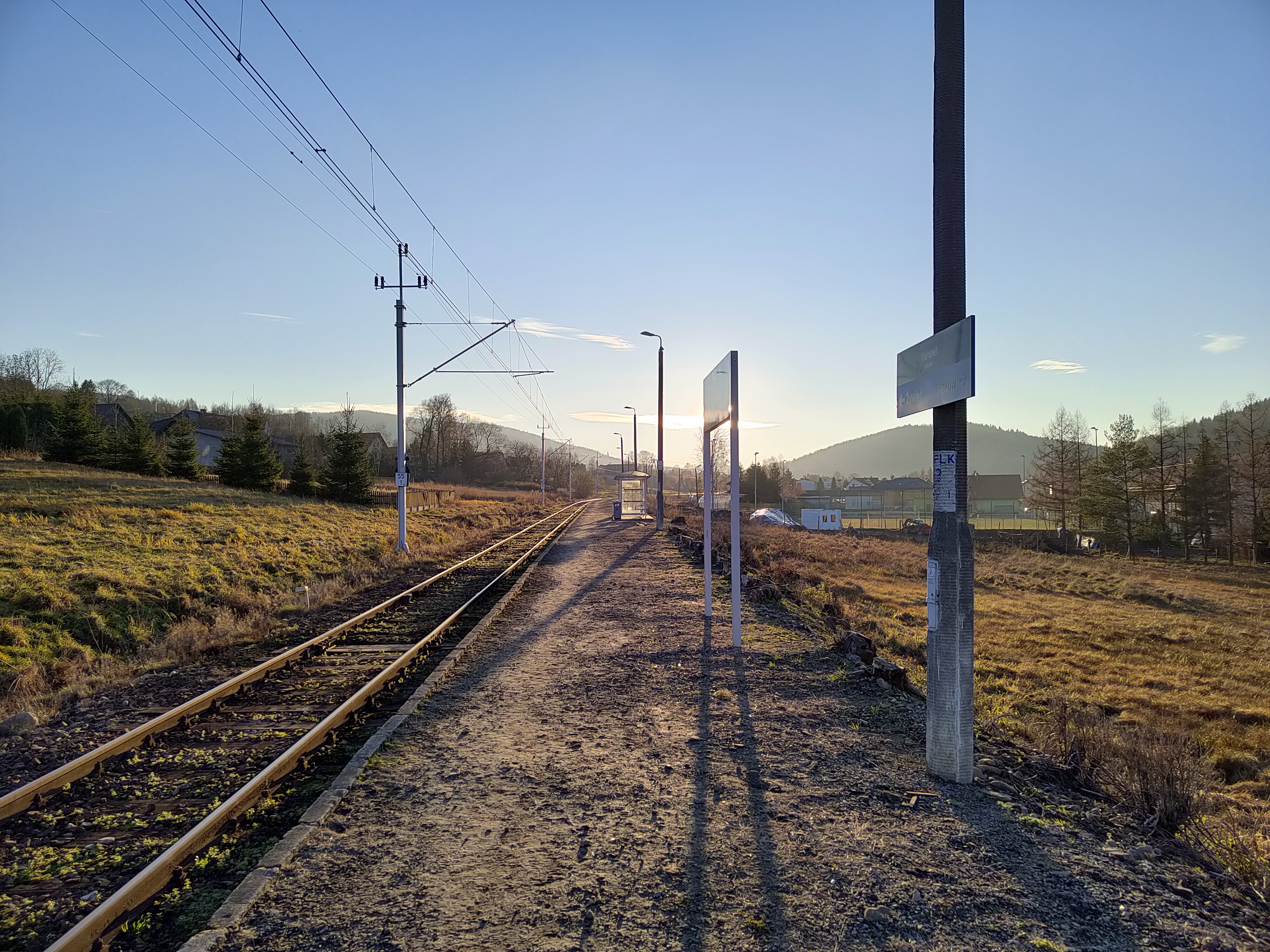
Lachowice Centrum railway stop

The Skawina–Żywiec railway (rail line number 97) runs through Lachowice. It was a part of the Galician Transversal Railway system. In the centre of the village, there is a railway stop, named Lachowice Centrum. A train station named Lachowice is located on the territory of nearby Stryszawa village.

Lachowice is located by voivodeship road 946. Additionally, county roads number 1697K (Kuków—Lachowice—Koszarowa) and 1699K (Moszczanica—Ślemień—Lachowice) run through the village.

== Tourism ==
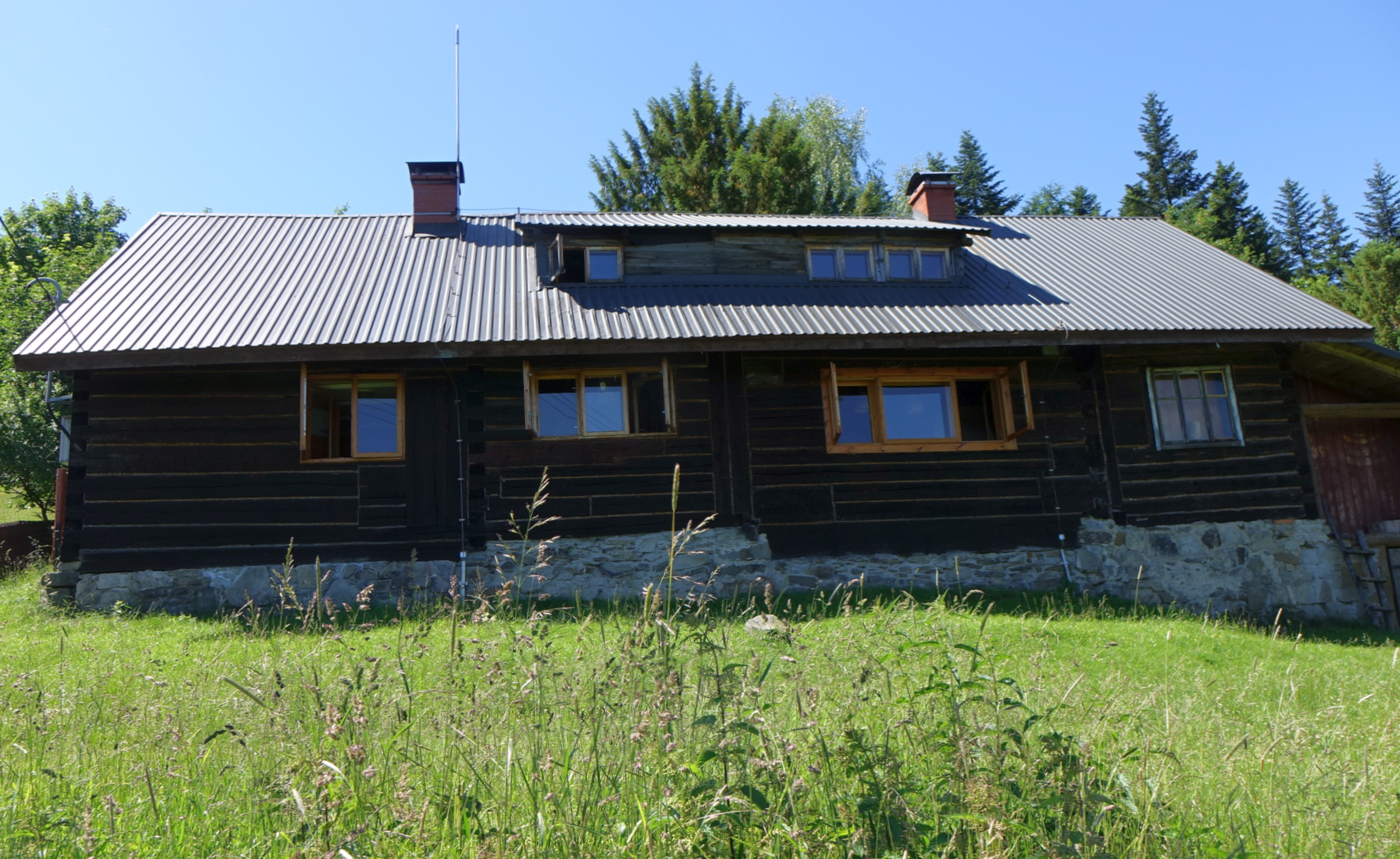
Tourist shelter

Lachowice is a starting point for tourist trails of the Żywiec Beskids and the Little Beskids. In the Adamy part of the village, there is a tourist shelter named "Pod Solniskiem". The Catholic church in Lachowice is one of the objects on Lesser Poland Voivodeship's Wooden Architecture Route.

== Religion ==
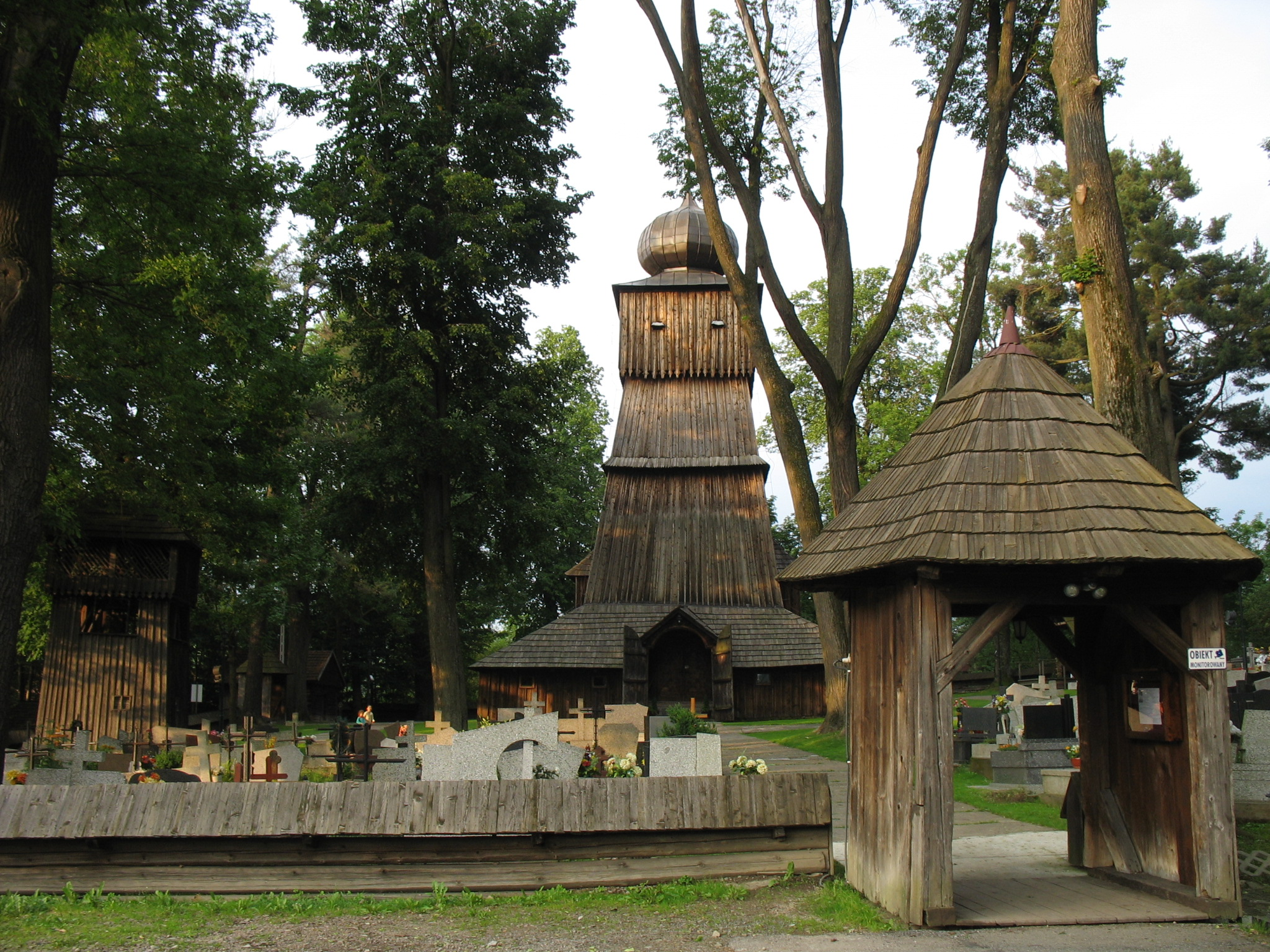
Church and cemetery

The wooden Roman Catholic Saints Peter and Paul church, raised in 1791 and consecrated in 1792, is located in the centre of the village, by a cemetery. The church is a seat of the local parish, which belongs to the Roman Catholic Archdiocese of Kraków. The church is under cultural property protection.

== Gallery ==
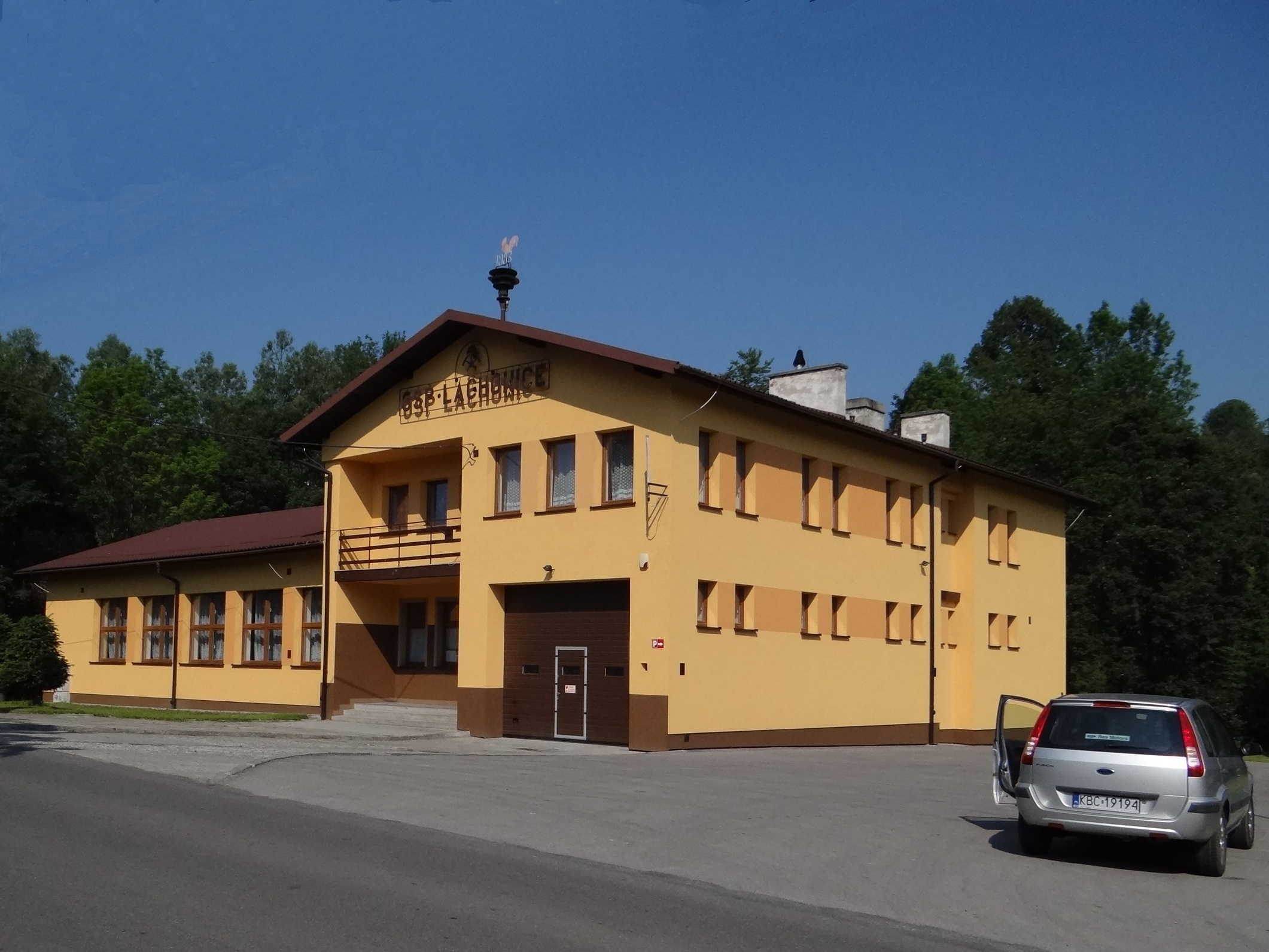
Fire station

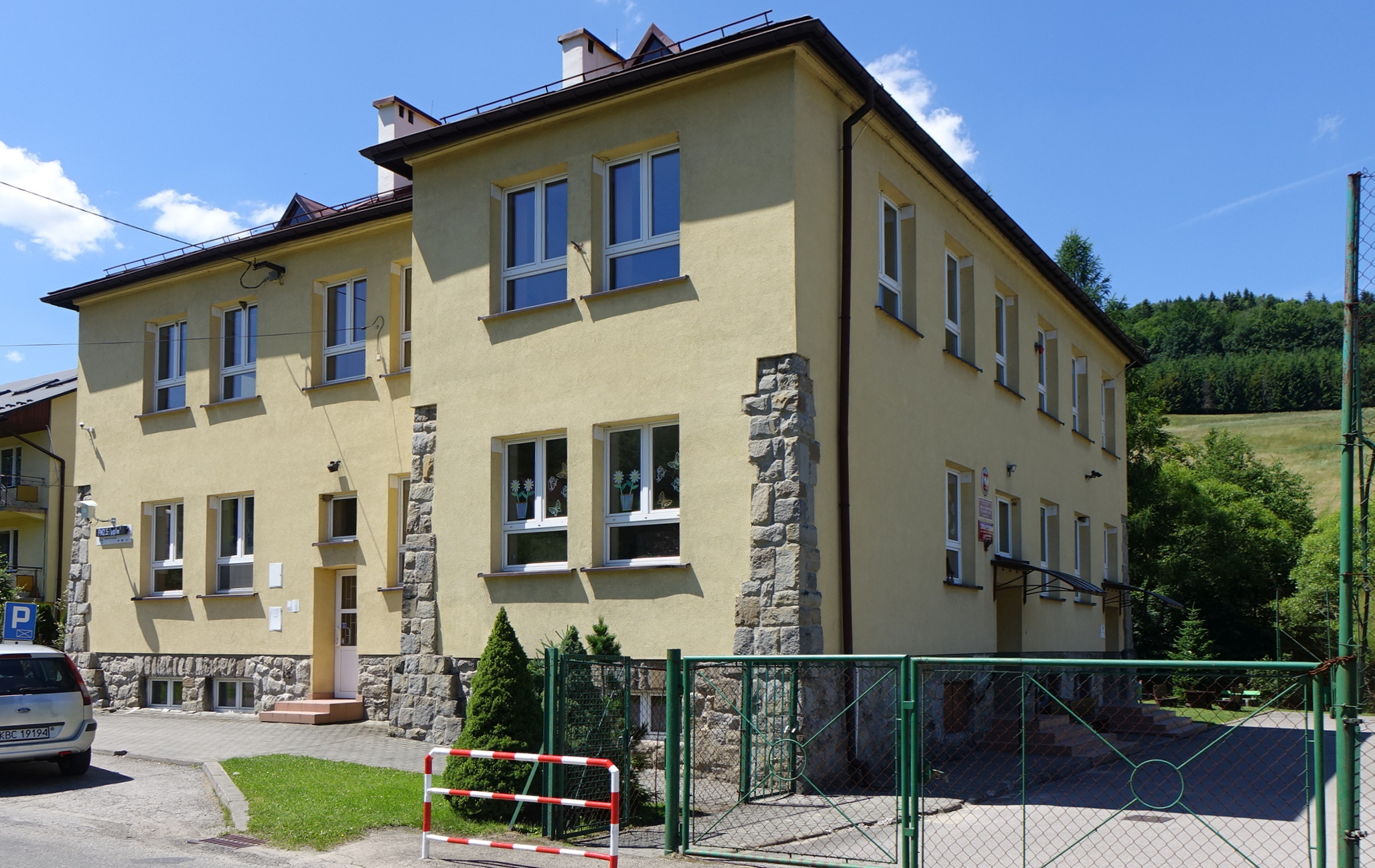
Elementary school

== Bibliography ==
- Sikora, Mirosław; Bortlik-Dźwierzyńska, Monika (2010), Aktion Saybusch. Wysiedlenie mieszkańców Żywiecczyzny przez okupanta niemieckiego 1940–1941, Katowice
- Szlenk-Dziubek, Dorota (2012), Studium uwarunkowań i kierunków zagospodarowania przestrzennego Gminy Stryszawa (PDF), archived from the original (PDF) on 2015-02-20
- Szczepaniak, Piotr (2023), Powiat żywiecki i jego mieszkańcy w czasie I wojny światowej (PDF), Katowice: Uniwersytet Śląski. Wydział Humanistyczny
