= Hucisko, Sucha County =

Hucisko
- Village
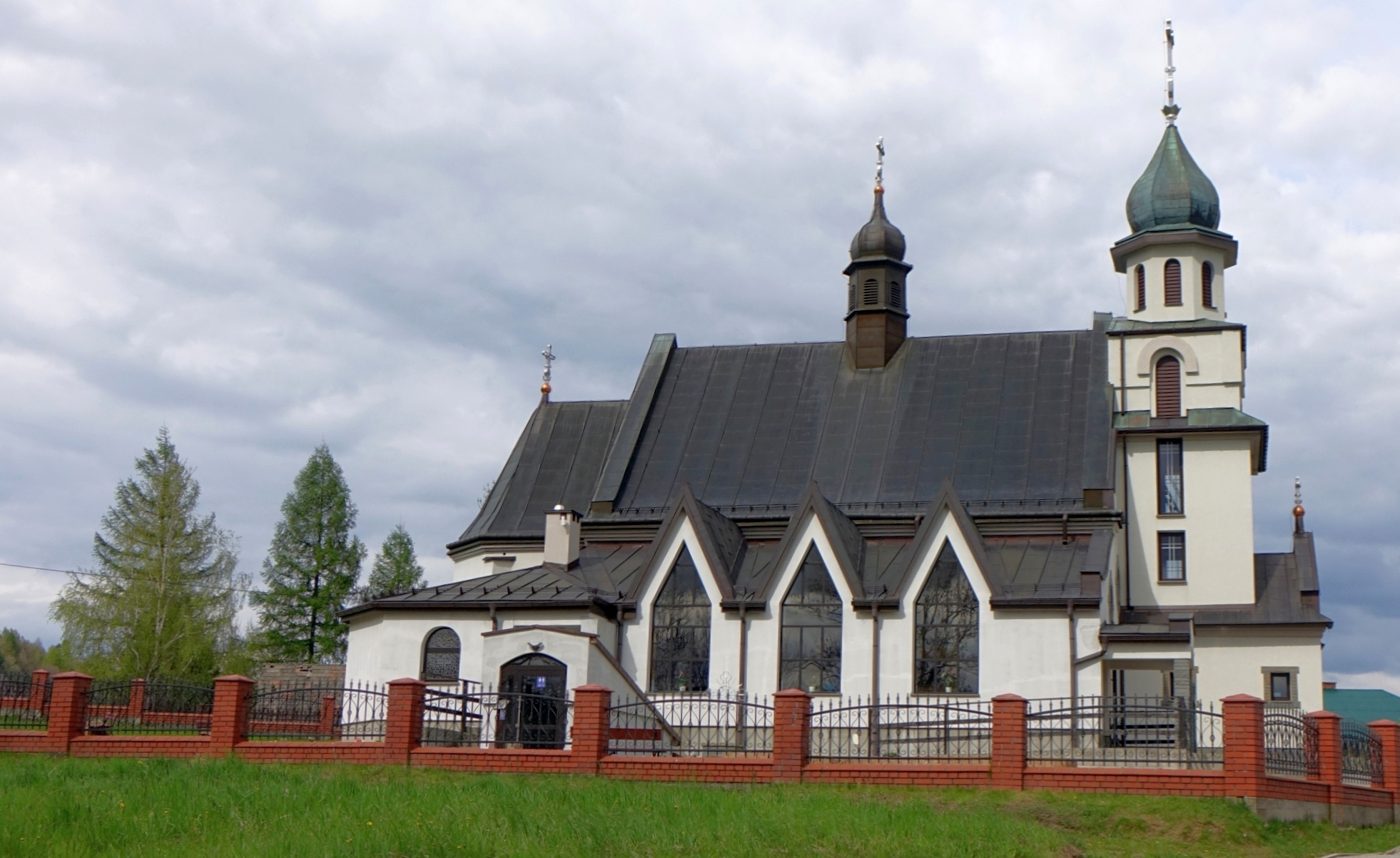
- Catholic church

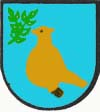
- Coat of arms

- Location within Poland
- Coordinates: 49°41′25″N 19°24′30″E
- Country: Poland
- Voivodeship: Lesser Poland
- County: Sucha
- Gmina: Stryszawa
- Population: 350
- Time zone: UTC+1 (CET)
  - Summer (DST): UTC+2
- Postal code: 34-233
- Area code: +4833
- Vehicle registration: KSU

Hucisko [xuˈt͡ɕiskɔ] is a village in the administrative district of Gmina Stryszawa, within Sucha County, Lesser Poland Voivodeship, in southern Poland.

== Geography ==
The village is located in the western part of the Lesser Poland Voivodeship, close to the border with the Silesian Voivodeship. It is situated in the historical Lesser Poland region, between the mountain ranges of Żywiec Beskids and Maków Beskids, in the valley of Pewlica, and is ethnically part of the Goral Lands. It sits in close proximity to the mountains of Trzy Kopce, Obocz, and Baków Groń. Its neighbouring villages are Pewelka, Lachowice, Pewel Wielka, and Ślemień. The sołectwo of Hucisko has an area of 383 hectares (950 acres).

=== Integral parts ===
According to the National Register of Geographical Names for 2025, the village of Hucisko had 10 integral parts, all classified as parts of the village (część wsi): Bieguny, Byrtkowa, Chaśnikówka, Gilowscy, Jaroszówka, Na Wytrzyszczonie, Rola Hulbujowa, U Stacji, U Walęgów, Wielkie Pole.

== History ==
The first settlers in the area of modern Hucisko were Vlachs, who came here in the 15th century. Hucisko was established in the 15th century as a hamlet (przysiółek) of Pewel Wielka. The village's name was derived from an iron-mill (huta). In the 17th century, there was a glass factory in Hucisko. In 1622, a violent clash between local Gorals and troops of Aleksander Komorowski occurred near Hucisko, resulting in several deaths and injuries.

After the local glass factory ceased operation in 1679, the area was divided into 15 homesteads. Due to the poverty and remoteness of Hucisko, its residents were exempted from serfdom duties. Some of them turned to banditry. Notably, Jakub Bienias from Hucisko was executed in Żywiec in 1721. At that time, Hucisko was inhabited by about 20 families. The local inn was owned by Wojciech Hojbuj. Since the 19th century, the village was owned by the House of Habsburg. In 1869, there were 50 houses in Hucisko, with about 300 people living in them.

Following the first partition of Poland in 1772, Hucisko was annexed by the Habsburg Empire, and remained in Austrian Galicia until 1918. On 31 December 1910, 412 people lived in the village, and the local estate was owned by Archduke Charles Stephen of Austria. The Austro-Hungarian government settled war refugees from the eastern regions of the country, occupied by the Russians, in Hucisko.

Following the end of the First World War, Hucisko became a part of the Second Polish Republic. It belonged to Żywiec County of Kraków Voivodeship. Since 1 January 1924, it belonged to Maków County. On 1 April 1932, it was incorporated back into Żywiec County. In 1918, an elementary school was opened in Hucisko. The local church was constructed in the late 1930s.

The village was occupied by Nazi Germany following the invasion of Poland in 1939, which marked the beginning of World War II. It was incorporated into the Province of Silesia (later in the Province of Upper Silesia). The Nazi administration introduced a new, German name for the village—Hüttenwald. The local school building was destroyed. In February 1945, heavy fighting between the German Wehrmacht and the Soviet Red Army took place in the area of Hucisko. The village's church tower served as an observation point for German snipers. On 2 February 1945, during the German retreat, three locals were killed. By the church, a mass grave was made for about 70–100 Soviet soldiers (their bodies were later moved to Moszczanica and Sucha Beskidzka).

After the end of the Second World War, the village became a part of Kraków Voivodeship. From 1954 until 1961, Hucisko was the seat of a local gromada (the lowest tier of local government). On 1 January 1956, it was transferred from Żywiec County to newly established Sucha County. In the years 1975–1998, it belonged to Bielsko Voivodeship. Since 1999, it is in Lesser Poland Voivodeship.

A new primary school in Hucisko was opened in 1947. In 1950, the volunteer fire department was established.

== Transport ==
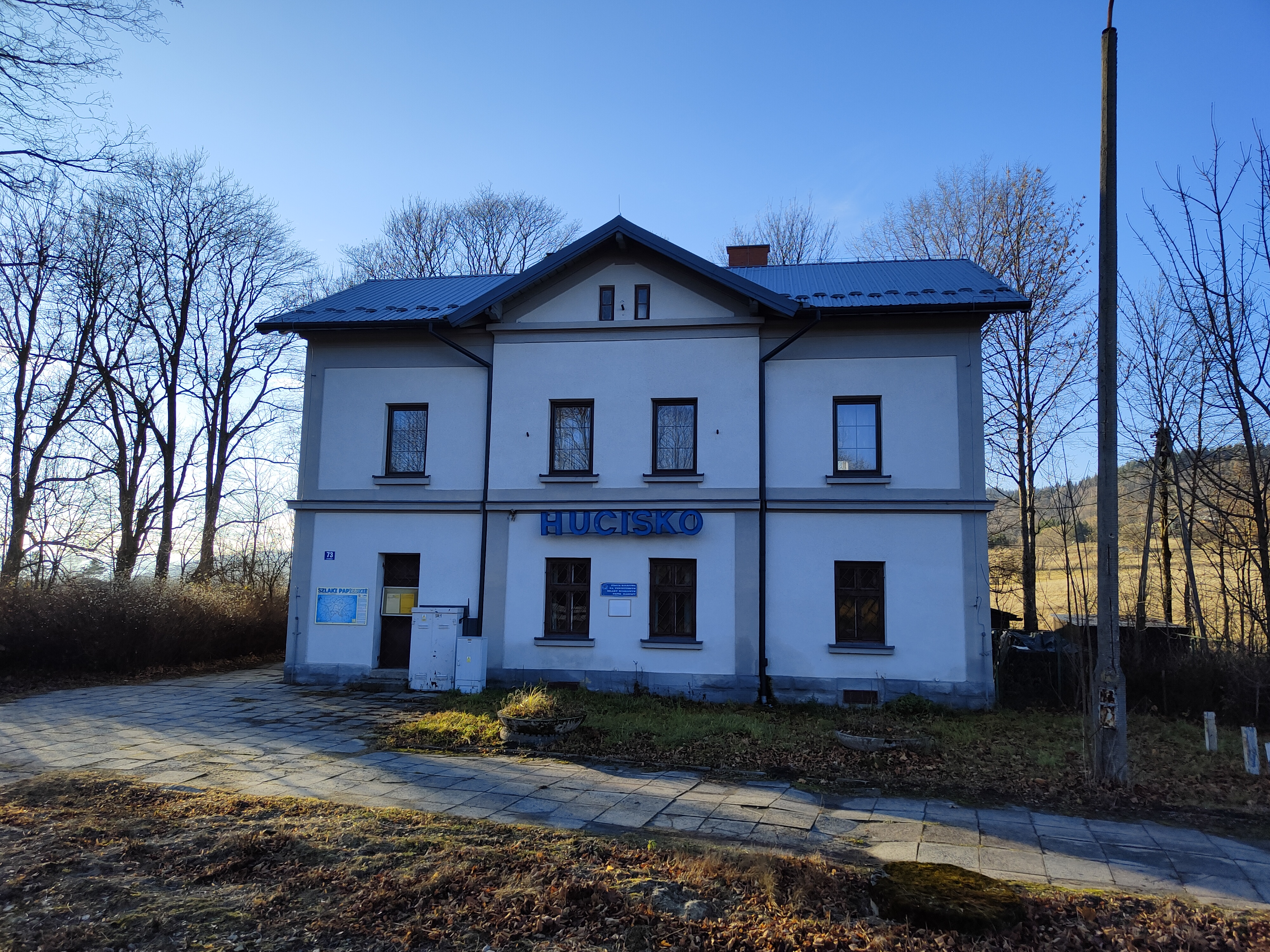
Hucisko railway station

The Skawina–Żywiec railway (rail line number 97) runs through Hucisko. It was a part of the Galician Transversal Railway system. In the eastern part of the village, there is a railway station, named Hucisko.

County roads number 1698K (Pewelka—Hucisko—Krale) and 1700K (Jeleśnia—Pewelka—Hucisko) run through the village.

== Religion ==
The Roman Catholic Immaculate Heart of Blessed Virgin Mary church, raised in 1939, is located in the north-eastern part of the village. The church is a seat of the local parish, which belongs to the Roman Catholic Archdiocese of Kraków.

== Bibliography ==
- Szlenk-Dziubek, Dorota (2012), Studium uwarunkowań i kierunków zagospodarowania przestrzennego Gminy Stryszawa (PDF), archived from the original (PDF) on 2015-02-20
- Szczepaniak, Piotr (2023), Powiat żywiecki i jego mieszkańcy w czasie I wojny światowej (PDF), Katowice: Uniwersytet Śląski. Wydział Humanistyczny
