= Stryszawa =

- Village
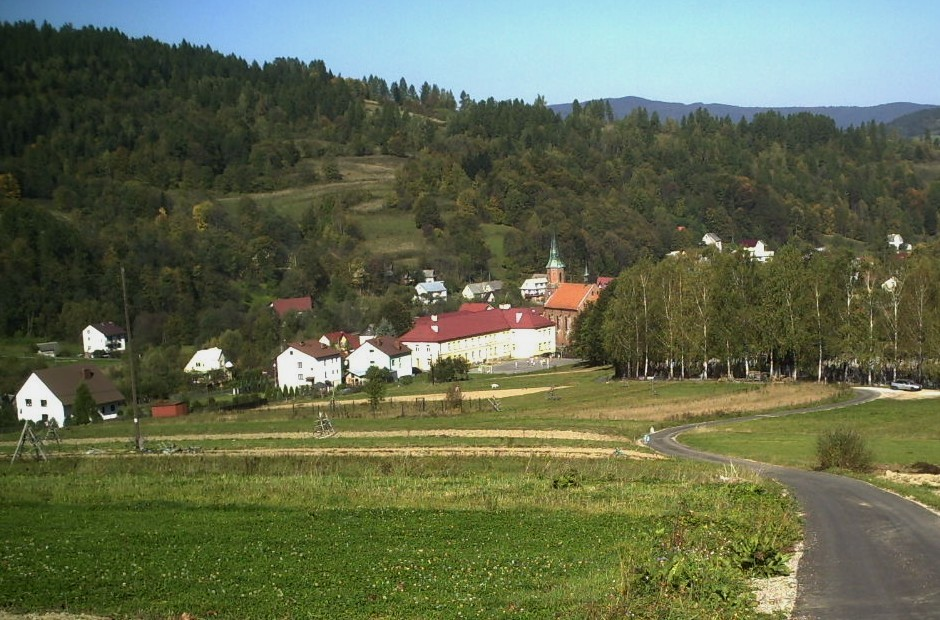
- General view

- Coat of arms

- Location within Poland
- Coordinates: 49°43′N 19°31′E
- Country: Poland
- Voivodeship: Lesser Poland
- County: Sucha
- Gmina: Stryszawa
- First mentioned: 1480
- Population: 5,100
- Time zone: UTC+1 (CET)
  - Summer (DST): UTC+2
- Postal code: 34-205
- Area code: +4833
- Vehicle registration: KSU

Stryszawa [strɨˈʂava] is a village, the seat of the administrative district of Gmina Stryszawa, within Sucha County, Lesser Poland Voivodeship, in southern Poland.

The village was established in the second half of the 15th century by Słupski family, the owners of Sucha, and was first mentioned in 1480.

== Geography ==
The village is located in the western part of the Lesser Poland Voivodeship, close to the border with the Silesian Voivodeship. It is the biggest village of Gmina Stryszawa. It is situated in the historical Lesser Poland region, between the mountain ranges of Żywiec Beskids and Maków Beskids, in the valley of Stryszawka, and is ethnically part of the Goral Lands. It sits in close proximity to the mountains of Gołuszkowa, Gawronowa, Czepelówka, Góra Wojewodowa, Jaworzyna, Pluchowa, Surzynówka, Opuśniak, and Solniska. Its neighbouring villages are Lachowice, Kuków, Krzeszów, Tarnawa Dolna, Zawoja, Koszarowa. It also borders the town of Sucha Beskidzka. The sołectwo of Stryszawa has an area of 4,083 hectares (10,090 acres).

=== Integral parts ===
According to the National Register of Geographical Names for 2025, the village of Stryszawa had 106 integral parts, divided into:

- 4 settlements (osada wsi): Chmiele, Lechówka, Stachówka Dolna, Stachówka Górna
- 29 hamlets (przysiółek wsi): Bańkowskie, Bartoszki, Chrząszcze, Cyrchel, Godowo, Hucisko, Janiki pod Magurką, Jaworskie, Jaworzyna Pierwsza, Kępy, Kopce, Kowaliczki, Mierkówka, Piwowary, Pod Miedzą, Polanka, Polańszczyki, Roztoki, Rusiniaki, Spyrki, Surzyny, Szłapy, Teofile, Tomczyki, Topory, Wsiarz, Za Miedzą, Zapadliny, Zarąbki
- 73 parts of the village (część wsi): Babiarze, Bachorzówka, Balcery, Bartyle, Bielarze, Biernaciki, Biłki, Blech, Bogunie, Bujary, Burzy, Carzaki, Ciaki, Cygany, Czepelówka, Czerna, Dudy, Dyduchy, Gancarzyki, Gawrony, Głuszki, Gołuszki, Handzele, Hetmańczyki, Ićki, Janiczki, Janiki, Jaworzyna Druga, Jurki, Kapicówka, Karczmarczyki, Kępy, Klimasory Dolne, Klimasory Górne, Kolędy, Kotelnica, Kotliki, Kowale, Krupiaki, Krzysie, Kwaki, Madejczyki, Magiery, Małysy, Matusy, Miki, Mikusy, Misierówka, Panki, Pietrusy, Pietyry, Pilarczyki, Pluchy, Sale, Sarleje, Sejkówka, Sikory, Siwce, Sołtysiki, Stachury, Steczki, Stryszawa Dolna, Stryszawa Górna, Surówka, Szałasiska, Świerkosze, Świerkosze nad Kościołem, Świerkoszówka, Trzopy, Wale, Wojewody, Wygoda, Zawodzie

== Etymology ==
The origin of the name Stryszawa is subject to several interpretations. 18th-century historian Andrzej Komoniecki proposed that the village was named after ice floes (strysz) or shugas (śryż) that accumulated on the local river during winter. In his etymological dictionary of toponyms in Poland, Stanisław Rospond claimed that the first recorded mention of the village was in 1338 as Stroyssowa and that it was named after its owner—Stroisz. However, this explanation actually refers to a different, older village of Stryszowa, near Wieliczka.

== History ==
The first settlers in the area of modern Stryszawa were Vlachs, who came here in the 15th century. The village was established in the second half of the 15th century. The first mention of Stryszawa was recorded in 1480. In the 16th century, the village was owned by the Słupski and the Suski families. The village was a part of the Sucha Beskidzka latifundium, later owned by the Wielopolski, Branicki, and Tarnowski families.

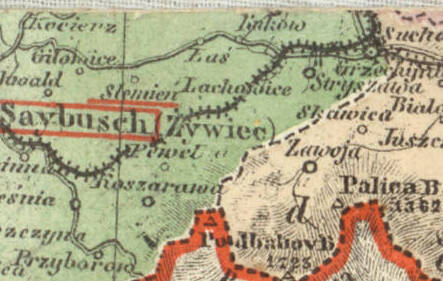
Stryszawa on an 1895 map of the Kingdom of Galicia and Lodomeria

Following the first partition of Poland in 1772, Stryszawa was annexed by the Habsburg Empire, and remained in Austrian Galicia until 1918. One of the biggest iron-mills of Galicia was located in Stryszawa. It employed approximately 300 people and was a subsidiary of Kuźnice Suskie. It was shut down in 1886, unable to compete with modernized Austrian and German iron-mills. In the late 19th century, people of the village took on toymaking and manufacture of other wooden products.

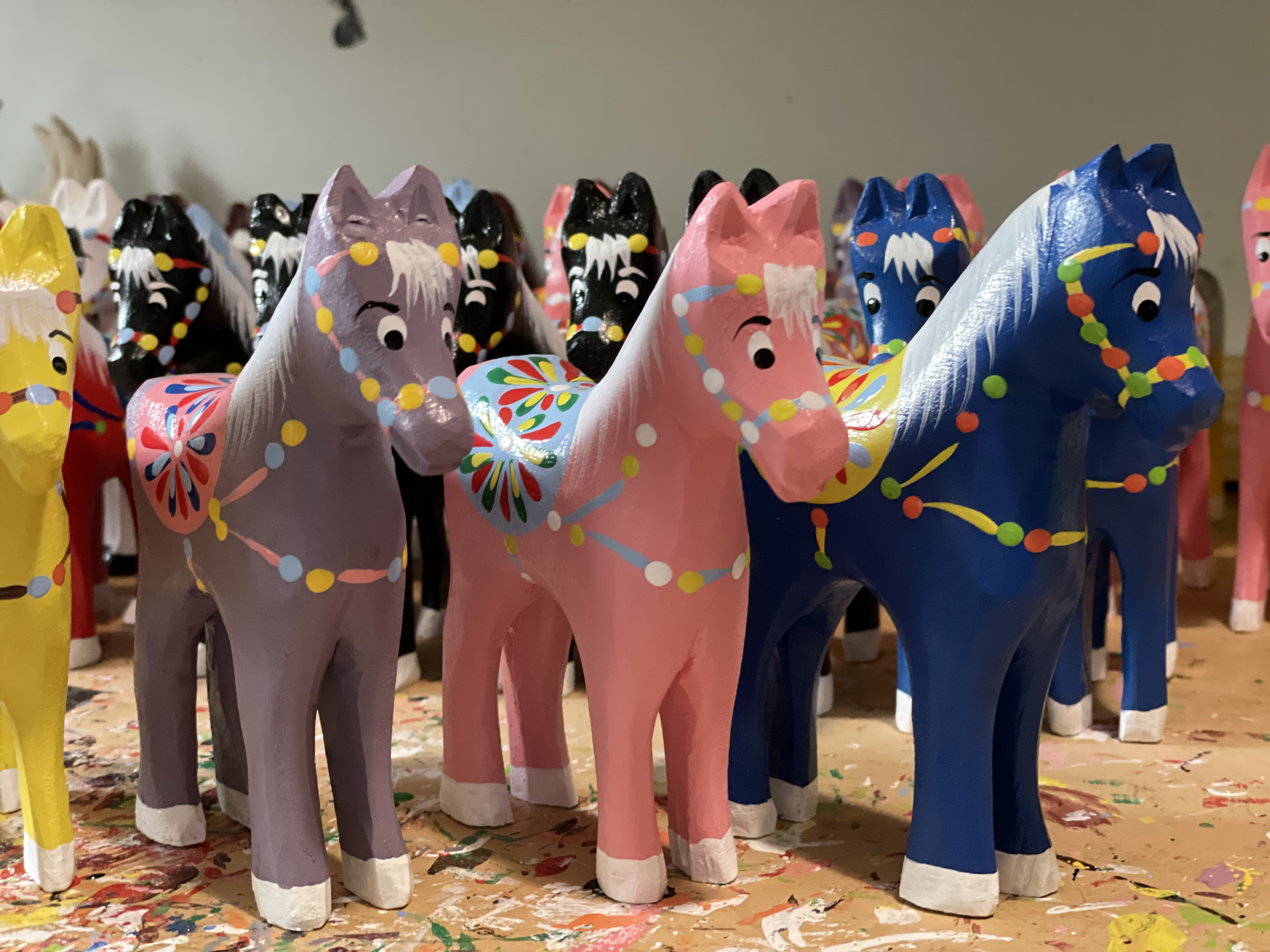
Wooden toys made in Stryszawa

On 31 December 1910, 4580 people lived in the village, and the local estate was owned by Władysław Michał Branicki. During the First World War, men from Stryszawa served in the Austro-Hungarian Army. On 15 and 16 April 1916, as a result of heavy snowstorms, forests near Stryszawa were almost completely destroyed. Franciszek Iciek and Jan Świerkosz from Stryszawa were awarded Medals for Bravery. Michał Siwiec from Stryszawa was an officer in the 56 Infantry Regiment. In 1917, two water mills operated in the village.

Following the end of the First World War, Stryszawa became a part of the Second Polish Republic. It belonged to Żywiec County of Kraków Voivodeship. Since 1 January 1924, it belonged to Maków County. On 1 April 1932, it was incorporated back into Żywiec County.

The village was occupied by Nazi Germany following the invasion of Poland in 1939, which marked the beginning of World War II. It was incorporated into the Province of Silesia (later in the Province of Upper Silesia). The Nazi administration introduced a new, German name for the village—Strichau. The first deportations of Polish people of Stryszawa in the so-called Action Saybusch, conducted by the Wehrmacht and Gestapo, took place on 26 September 1940. In total, 368 people (65 families) were deported then. They were transported to Sucha Beskidzka together with people from Lachowice, then by train to Łódź, after which they were dispersed to various places in the General Government and the Third Reich. In the second deportation, on 10 October 1940, only one person was deported from Stryszawa. 16 German families (70 people) were settled in Stryszawa on 26 November 1940.

After the end of the Second World War, some residents of Stryszawa left the village and settled in the Recovered Territories. The village became a part of Kraków Voivodeship. From 1954 until 1973, Stryszawa was the seat of a local gromada (the lowest tier of local government). On 1 January 1956, it was transferred from Żywiec County to newly established Sucha County. In the years 1975–1998, it belonged to Bielsko Voivodeship. Since 1999, it is in Lesser Poland Voivodeship.

== Transport ==
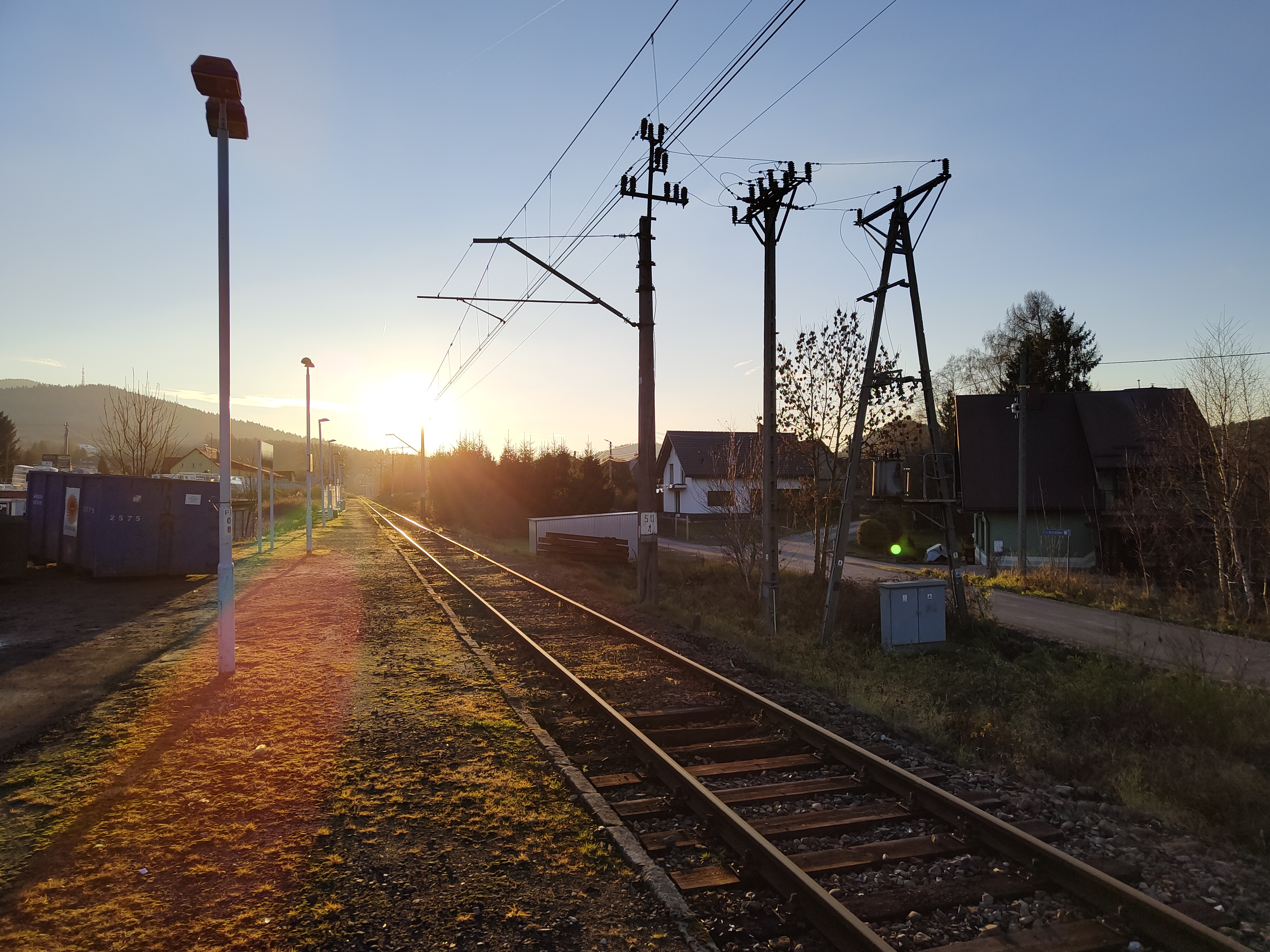
Stryszawa railway stop

The Skawina–Żywiec railway (rail line number 97) runs through Stryszawa. It was a part of the Galician Transversal Railway system. In the northern part of the village, there is a railway stop, named Stryszawa. Located on the territory of Stryszawa is also a train station named Lachowice.

Stryszawa is located by voivodeship road 946. Additionally, county roads number 1695K (Zawoja—Przysłop—Stryszawa), 1696K (Stryszawa—Roztoki—Koszarawa), and 1703K (Stryszawa—Krzeszów) run through the village.

== Tourism ==
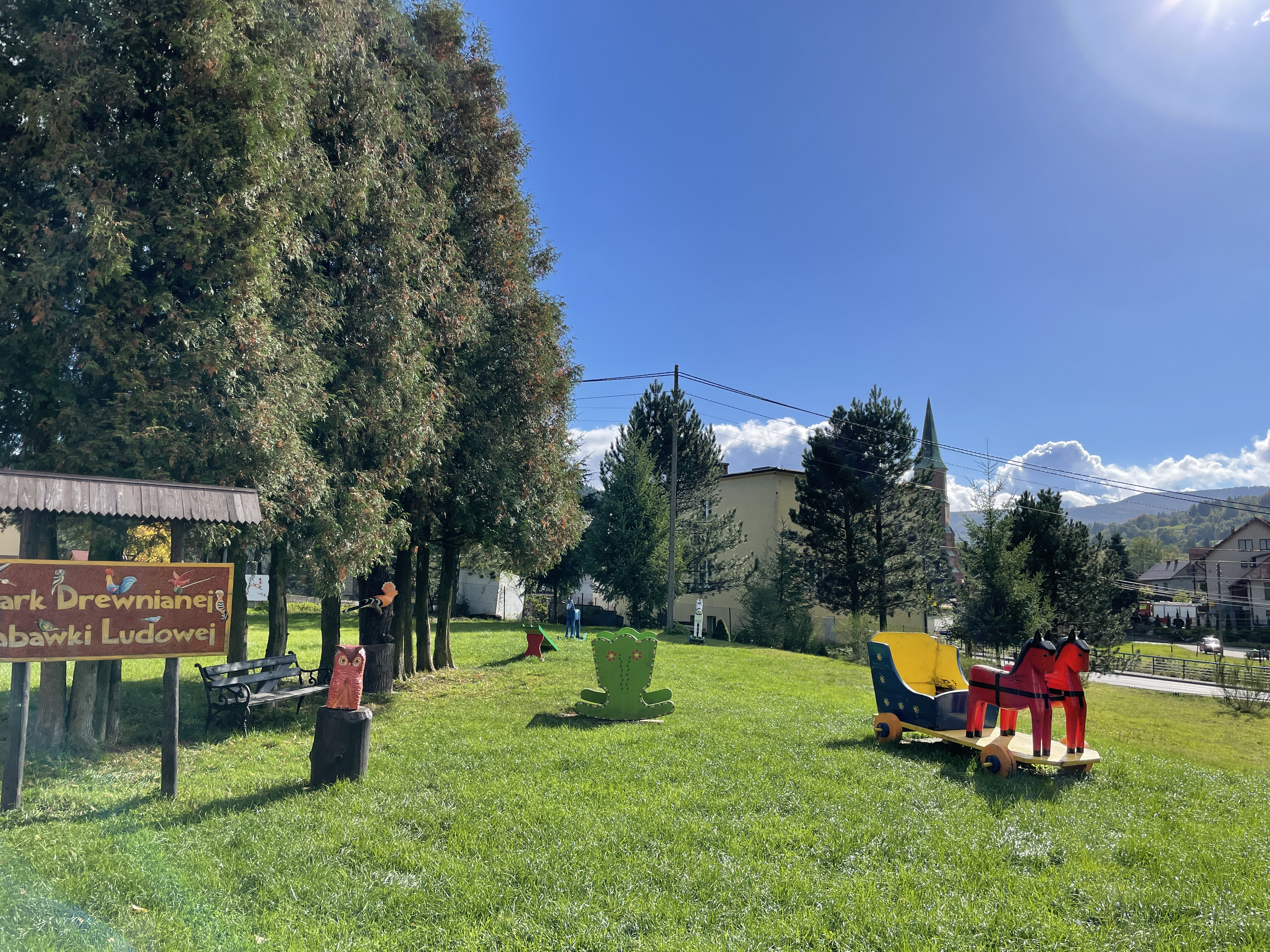
Beskid Wooden Toy Centre

The village serves as an excursions base for the Beskid Mountains. The Beskid Wooden Toy Centre (Beskidzkie Centrum Zabawki Drewnianej), popularizing the local toymaking traditions, was established in Stryszawa. A 25-meter-tall observation tower was built in the village.

== Religion ==
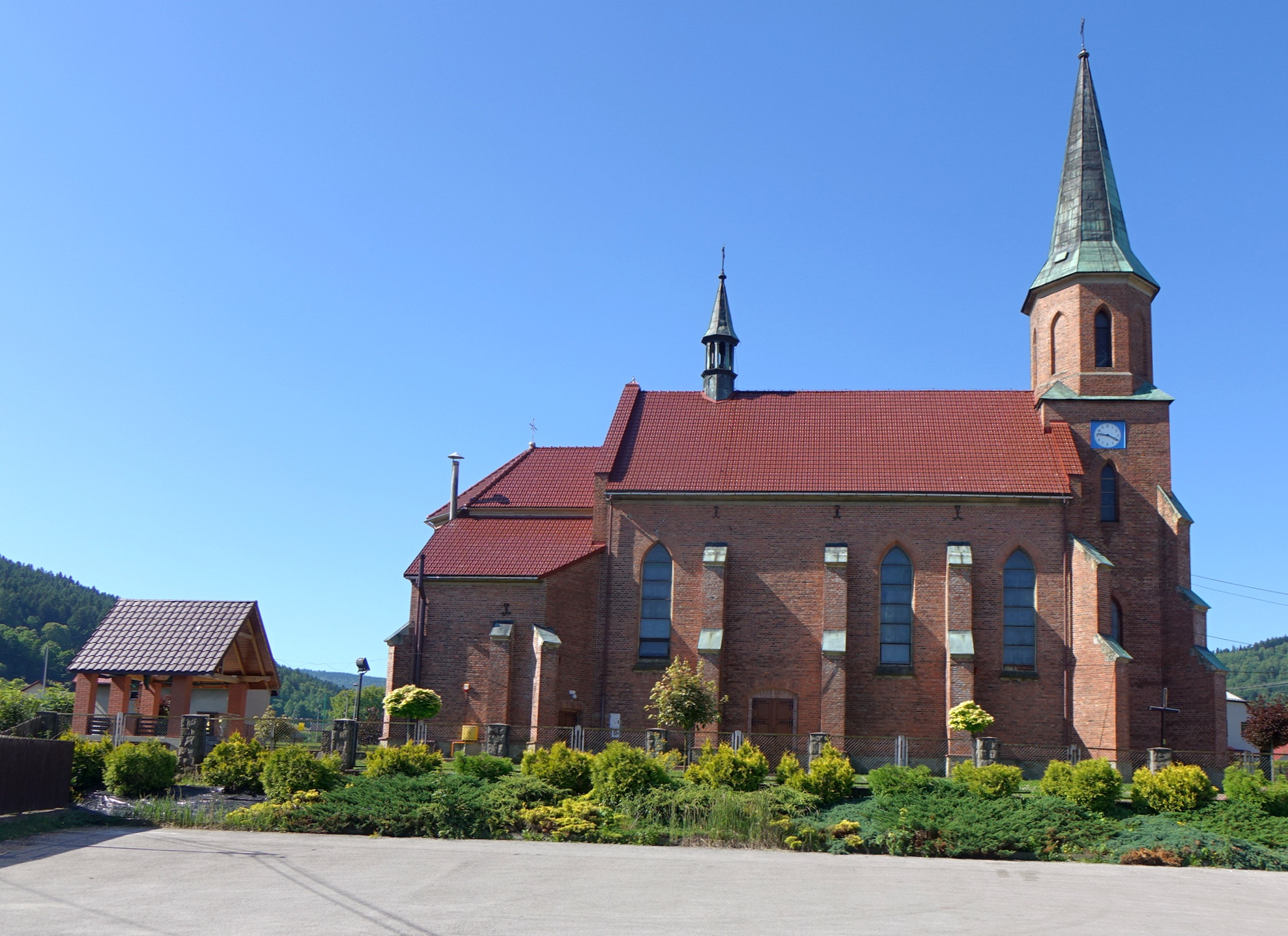
Saint Anne church

In Stryszawa, there are two Roman Catholic churches. They are dedicated to Saint Anne and Saint Stanislaus Bishop and Martyr. Both are seats of local parishes, which belong to the Roman Catholic Archdiocese of Kraków.

== Gallery ==
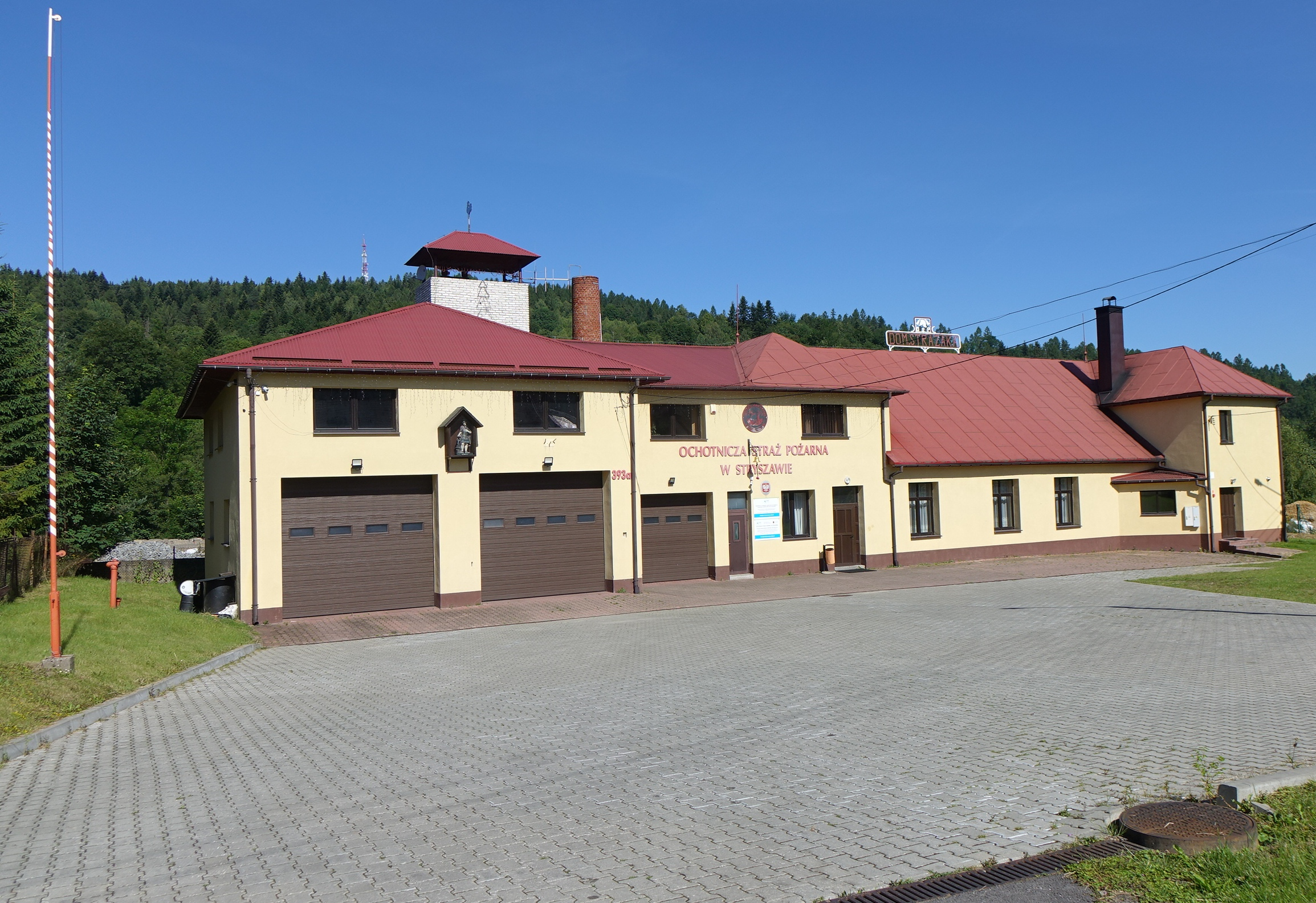
Fire station

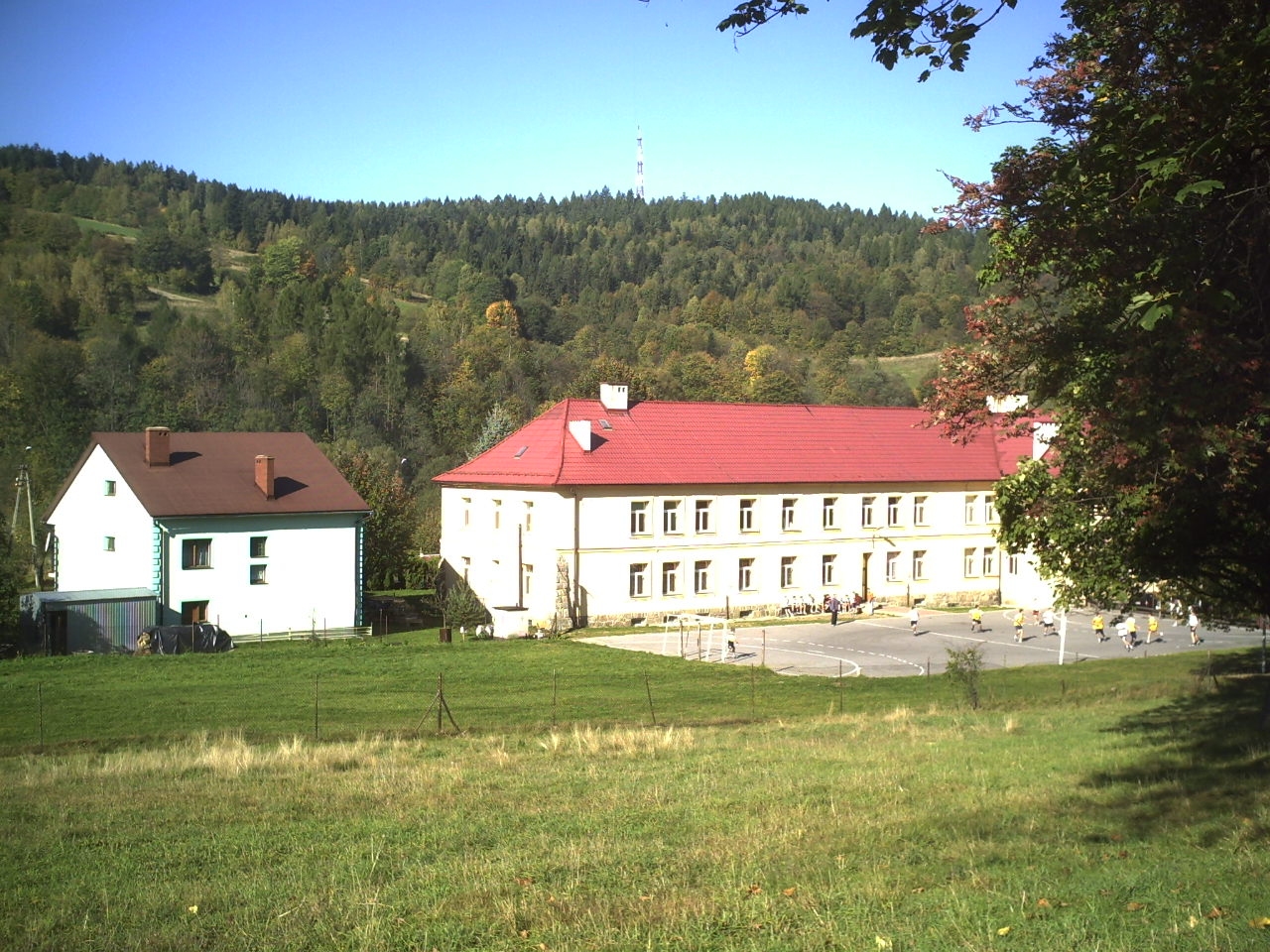
Elementary school

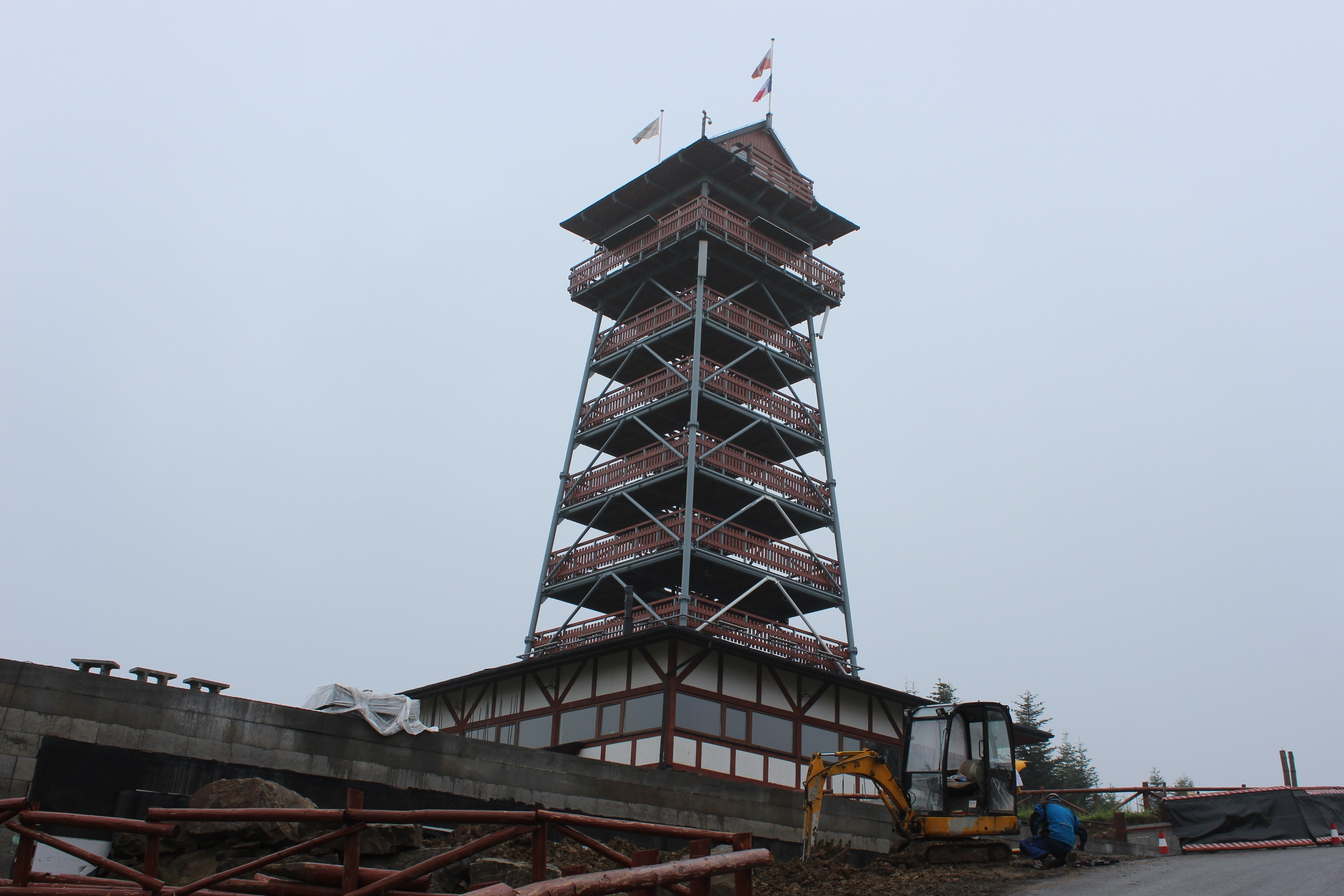
Observation tower

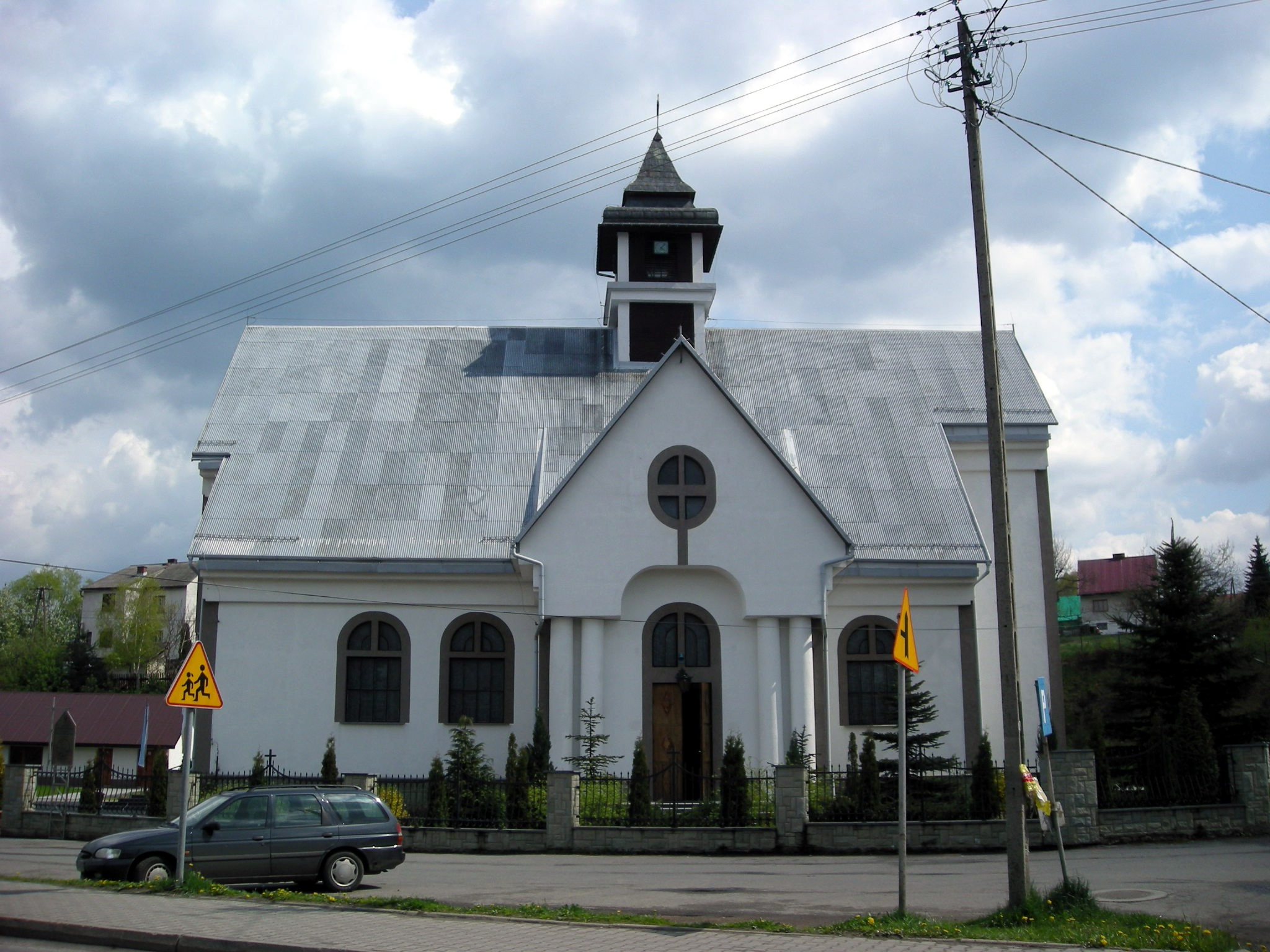
Saint Stanislaus Bishop and Martyr church

== Bibliography ==
- Sikora, Mirosław; Bortlik-Dźwierzyńska, Monika (2010), Aktion Saybusch. Wysiedlenie mieszkańców Żywiecczyzny przez okupanta niemieckiego 1940–1941, Katowice
- Szlenk-Dziubek, Dorota (2012), Studium uwarunkowań i kierunków zagospodarowania przestrzennego Gminy Stryszawa (PDF), archived from the original (PDF) on 2015-02-20
- Szczepaniak, Piotr (2023), Powiat żywiecki i jego mieszkańcy w czasie I wojny światowej (PDF), Katowice: Uniwersytet Śląski. Wydział Humanistyczny
