= U Kachla =

- Village
- Location within Poland
- Coordinates: 49°42′50″N 19°31′19″E
- Country: Poland
- Voivodeship: Lesser Poland
- County: Sucha
- Gmina: Stryszawa
- Time zone: UTC+1 (CET)
  - Summer (DST): UTC+2
- Area code: +4833
- Vehicle registration: KSU

U Kachla is a village in the administrative district of Gmina Stryszawa, within Sucha County, Lesser Poland Voivodeship, southern Poland.

The National Register of Geographical Names for 2025 classified U Kachla as a forest settlement (osada leśna). Until 2013, the village was classified as a forester's lodge (leśniczówka).
