= Krzeszów, Lesser Poland Voivodeship =

Krzeszów
- Village
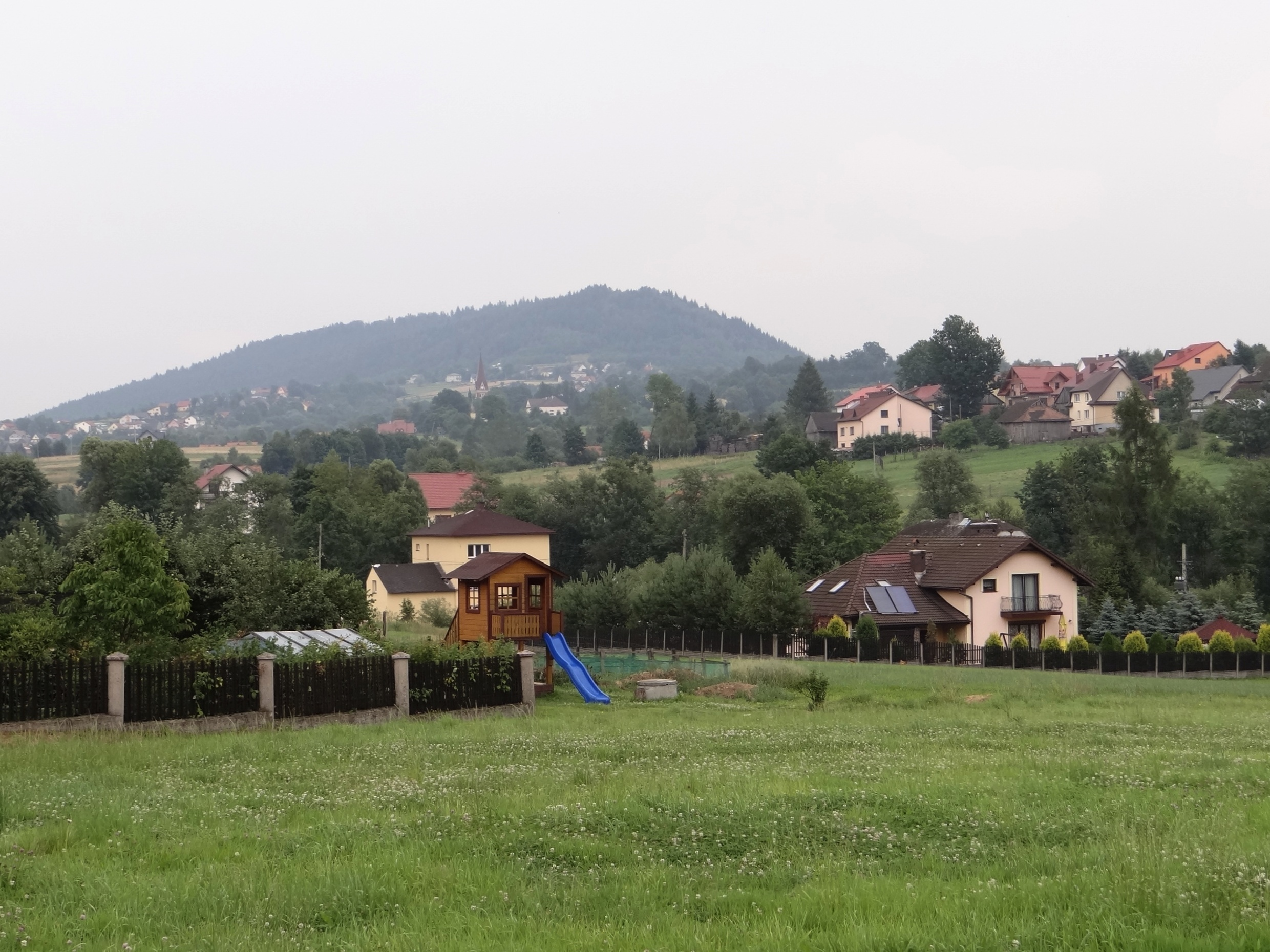

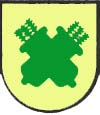
- Coat of arms

- Location within Poland
- Coordinates: 49°46′N 19°29′E
- Country: Poland
- Voivodeship: Lesser Poland
- County: Sucha
- Gmina: Stryszawa
- Population: 1,618
- Time zone: UTC+1 (CET)
  - Summer (DST): UTC+2
- Postal code: 34-206
- Area code: +4833
- Vehicle registration: KSU

Krzeszów [ˈkʂɛʂuf] is a village in the administrative district of Gmina Stryszawa, within Sucha County, Lesser Poland Voivodeship, in southern Poland.

== Geography ==
The village is located in the western part of the Lesser Poland Voivodeship, close to the border with the Silesian Voivodeship. It is the third biggest village of Gmina Stryszawa. It is situated in the historical Lesser Poland region, between the mountain ranges of Żywiec Beskids and Maków Beskids, in the valley of Krzeszówka, and is ethnically part of the Goral Lands. It sits in close proximity to the mountains of Góra Sołowa, Kukowska Gajka, Gronik, and Żurawnica. Its neighbouring villages are Tarnawa Górna, Śleszowice, Stryszawa, Kuków, and Targoszów. The sołectwo of Krzeszów has an area of 1,554 hectares (3,840 acres).

=== Integral parts ===
According to the National Register of Geographical Names for 2025, the village of Krzeszów had 33 integral parts, divided into:

- 6 settlements (osada wsi): Czubakówka, Górki, Kadelówka, Granica, Podoły, Podkoźle
- 7 hamlets (przysiółek wsi): Gibasy, Gracjaszówka, Koźle, Podkoziel, Podlas, Sochy, Za Niwą
- 20 parts of the village (część wsi): Bór, Charańczykówka, Czejnochówka, Drewianki, Fludrówka, Kaźmierzakówka, Krzaki, Krzeszów Dolny, Krzeszów Górny, Mąrgosiaki, Międzygronia, Miśkówka, Palichlebówka, Podpagórek, Sekułówka, Sikorowiec, Ścieżkówka, Wojcikówka, Wyrwówka, Zarębki

== Bibliography ==
- Szlenk-Dziubek, Dorota (2012), Studium uwarunkowań i kierunków zagospodarowania przestrzennego Gminy Stryszawa (PDF), archived from the original (PDF) on 2015-02-20
