= Krzeszów =

Krzeszów may refer to the following villages in Poland:

- Krzeszów, Lower Silesian Voivodeship (south-west Poland)
- Krzeszów, Subcarpathian Voivodeship (south-east Poland)
- Krzeszów, Lesser Poland Voivodeship (south Poland)
