= Gmina Stryszawa =

Gmina Stryszawa Stryszawa Commune
- Gmina
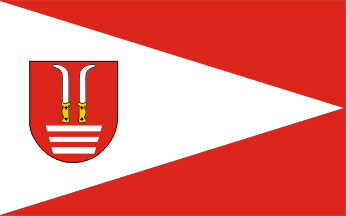
- Flag Coat of arms
- Interactive map of Gmina Stryszawa
- Coordinates (Stryszawa): 49°43′N 19°31′E
- Country: Poland
- Voivodeship: Lesser Poland
- County: Sucha
- Seat: Stryszawa

Area
  - Total: 113.24 km^{2} (43.72 sq mi)

Population (2006)
  - Total: 11,710
  - Density: 103.4/km^{2} (267.8/sq mi)
- Website: http://www.stryszawa.ug.pl

Gmina Stryszawa is a rural gmina (administrative district) in Sucha County, Lesser Poland Voivodeship, in southern Poland. Its seat is the village of Stryszawa, which lies approximately 7 kilometres (4 mi) west of Sucha Beskidzka and 50 km (31 mi) south-west of the regional capital Kraków.

The gmina covers an area of 113.24 square kilometres (43.7 sq mi), and as of 2006 its total population was 11,710.

== Villages ==
Gmina Stryszawa contains the villages and settlements of Hucisko, Krzeszów, Kuków, Kurów, Lachowice, Pewelka, Stryszawa and Targoszów.

== Neighbouring gminas ==
Gmina Stryszawa is bordered by the town of Sucha Beskidzka and by the gminas of Andrychów, Jeleśnia, Koszarawa, Maków Podhalański, Ślemień, Zawoja and Zembrzyce.
