= Targoszów =

- Village
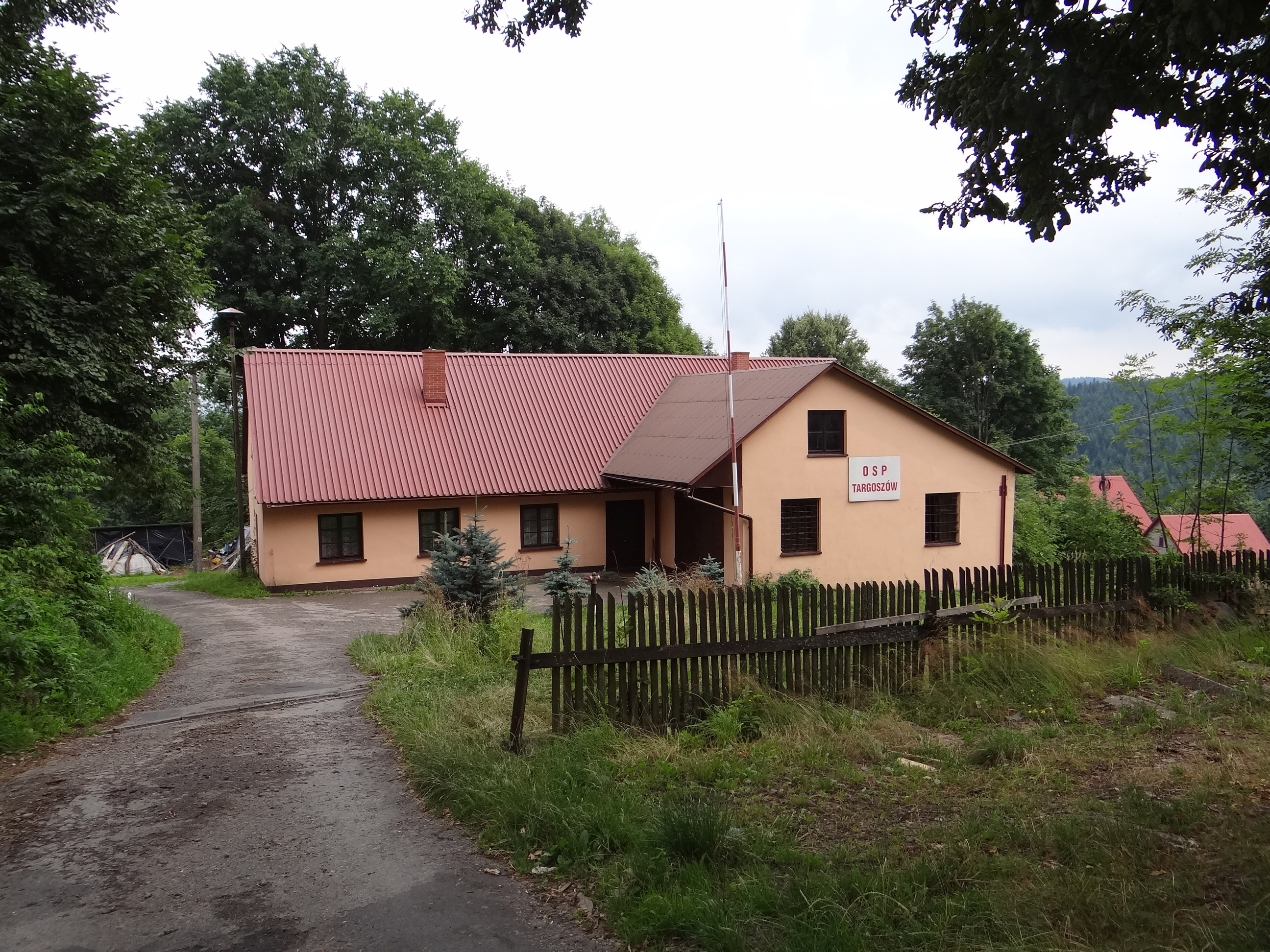
- Fire station

- Location within Poland
- Coordinates: 49°46′N 19°28′E
- Country: Poland
- Voivodeship: Lesser Poland
- County: Sucha
- Gmina: Stryszawa
- Highest elevation: 750 m (2,460 ft)
- Lowest elevation: 500 m (1,600 ft)
- Time zone: UTC+1 (CET)
  - Summer (DST): UTC+2
- Postal code: 34-206
- Area code: +4833
- Vehicle registration: KSU

Targoszów [tarˈɡɔʂuf] is a village in the administrative district of Gmina Stryszawa, within Sucha County, Lesser Poland Voivodeship, in southern Poland.
