= Kurów, Sucha County =

Kurów
- Village
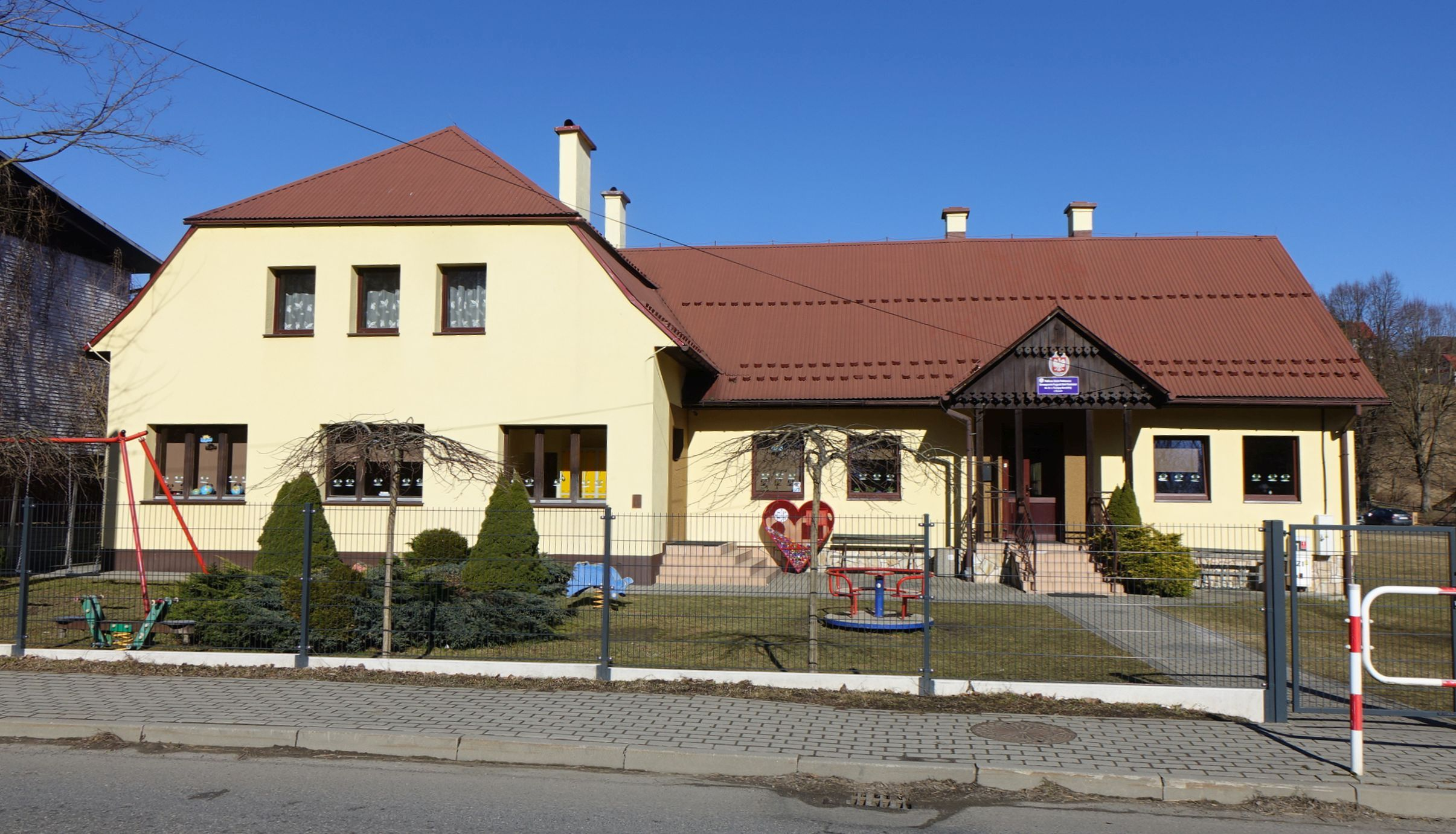
- Primary school

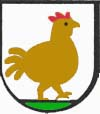
- Coat of arms

- Location within Poland
- Coordinates: 49°44′N 19°27′E
- Country: Poland
- Voivodeship: Lesser Poland
- County: Sucha
- Gmina: Stryszawa
- Population: 700
- Time zone: UTC+1 (CET)
  - Summer (DST): UTC+2
- Postal code: 34-233
- Area code: +4833
- Vehicle registration: KSU
- Website: http://www.ospkurow.com.pl

Kurów [ˈkuruf] is a village in the administrative district of Gmina Stryszawa, within Sucha County, Lesser Poland Voivodeship, in southern Poland.
