= Pewelka =

- Village
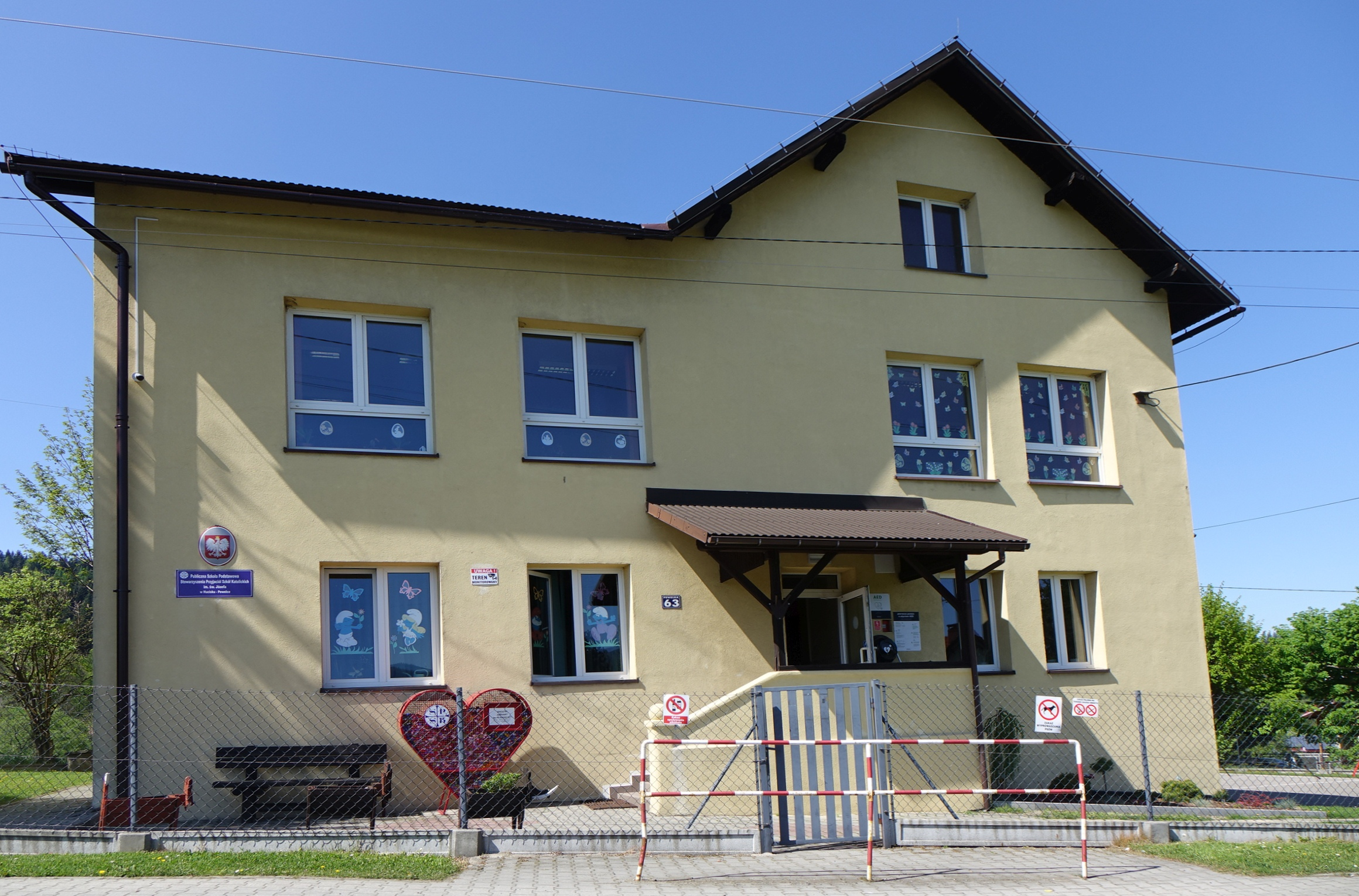
- Primary school

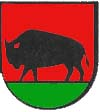
- Coat of arms

- Location within Poland
- Coordinates: 49°43′N 19°25′E
- Country: Poland
- Voivodeship: Lesser Poland
- County: Sucha
- Gmina: Stryszawa
- Time zone: UTC+1 (CET)
  - Summer (DST): UTC+2
- Postal code: 34-233
- Area code: +4833
- Vehicle registration: KSU

Pewelka [pɛˈvɛlka] is a village in the administrative district of Gmina Stryszawa, within Sucha County, Lesser Poland Voivodeship, in southern Poland.
