= Pewel Wielka =

- Village
- Location within Poland
- Coordinates: 49°39′N 19°20′E
- Country: Poland
- Voivodeship: Silesian
- County: Żywiec
- Gmina: Jeleśnia
- Population: 1,548

Pewel Wielka [ˈpɛvɛl ˈvjɛlka] is a village in the administrative district of Gmina Jeleśnia, within Żywiec County, Silesian Voivodeship, in southern Poland.
