= Sucha Beskidzka =

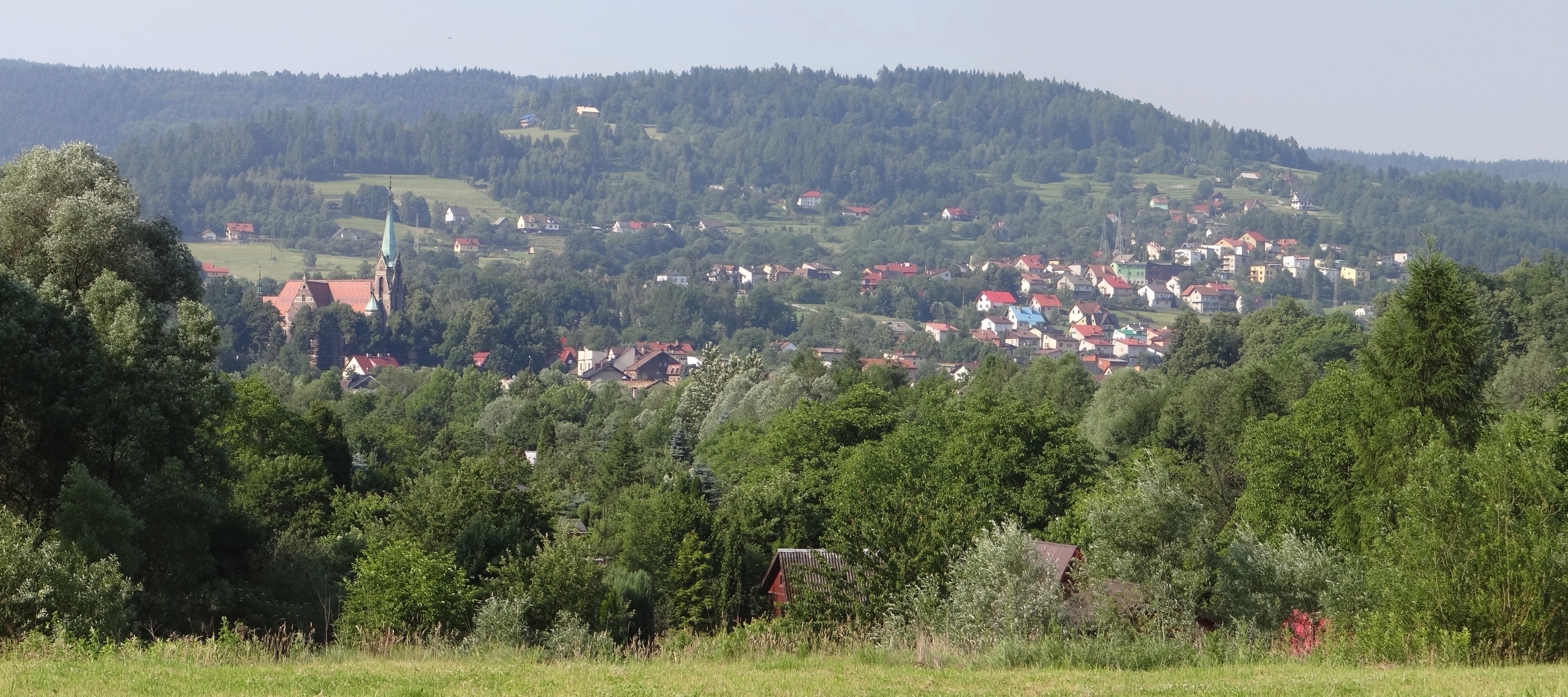
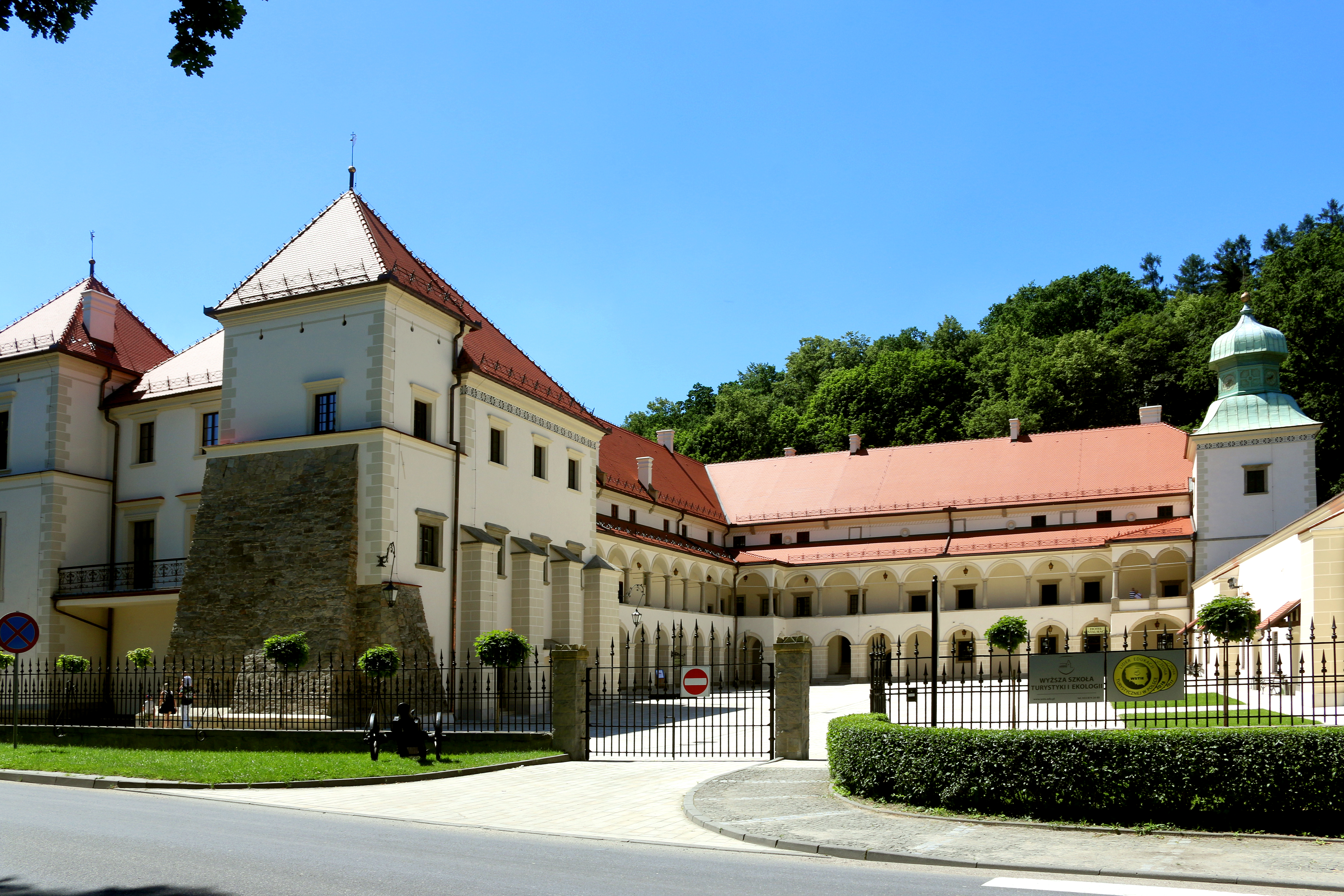
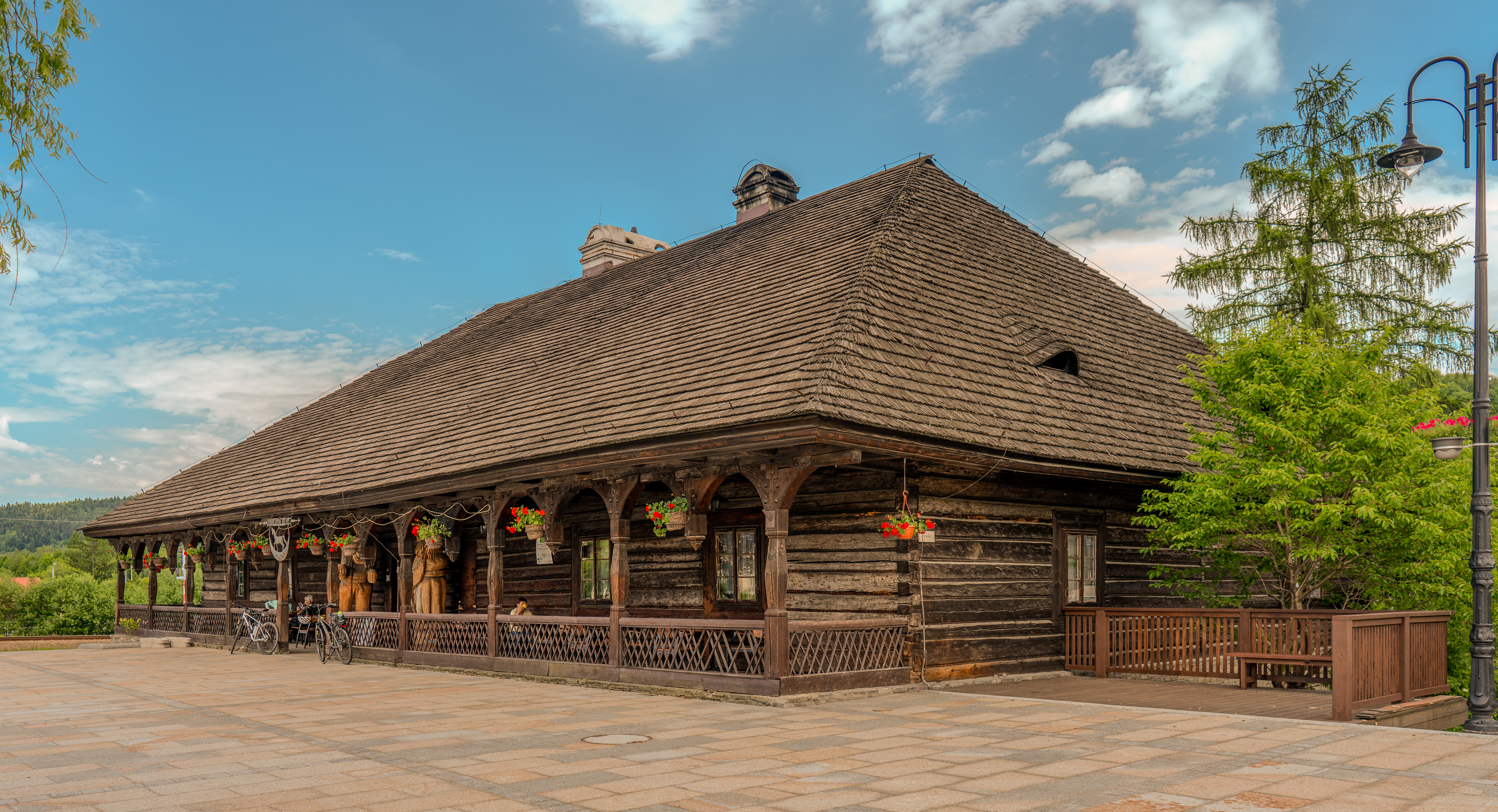
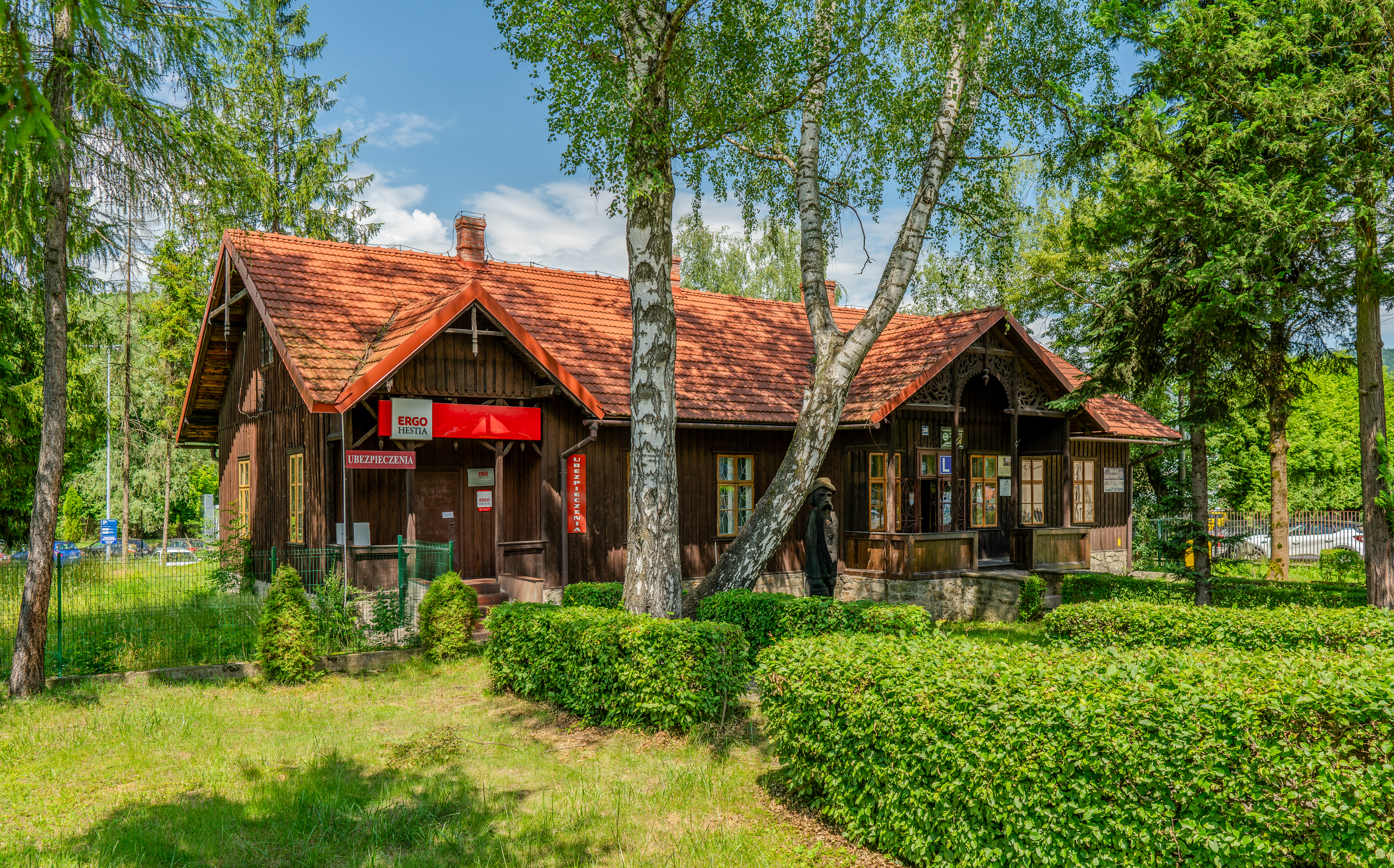
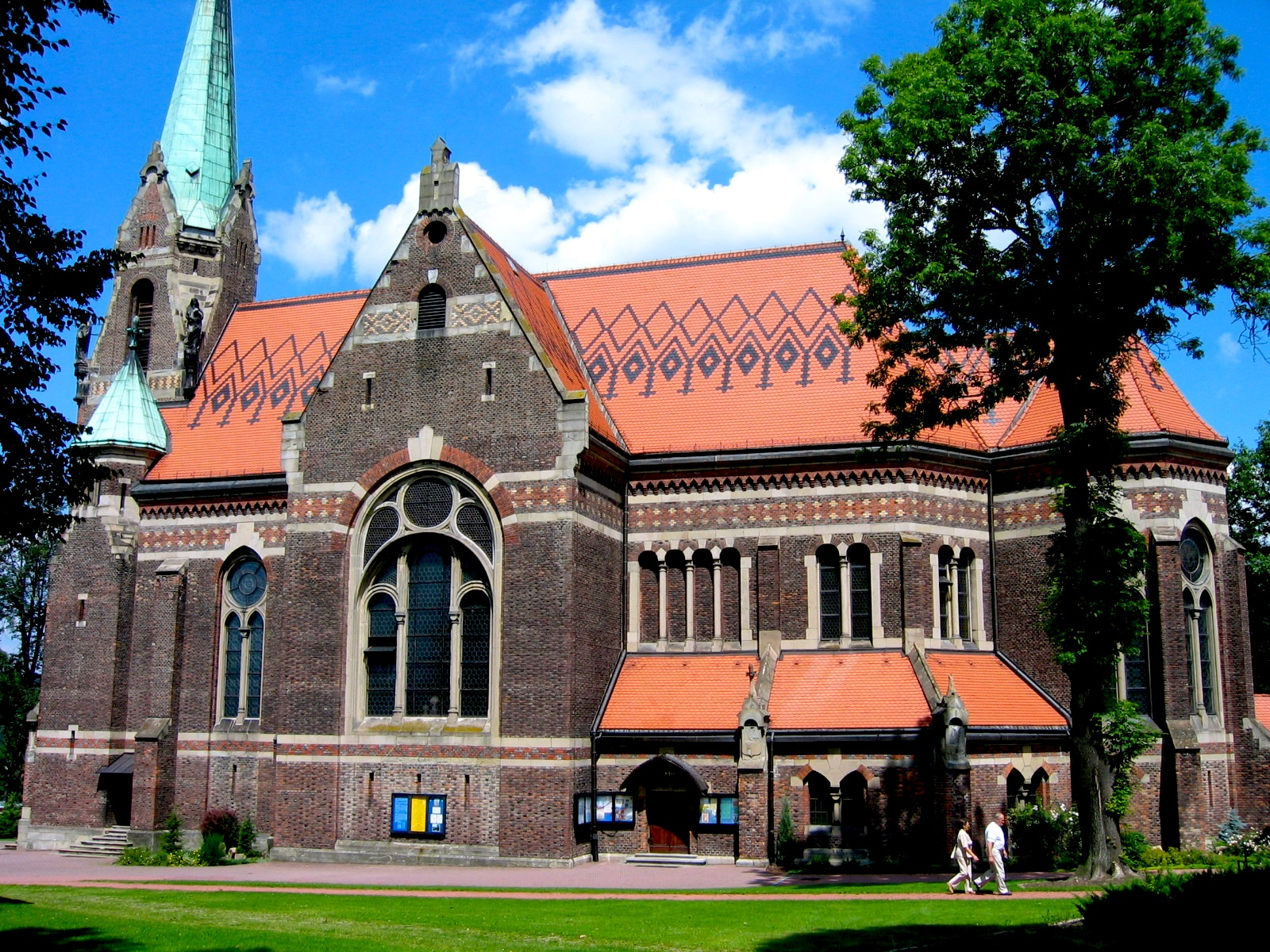
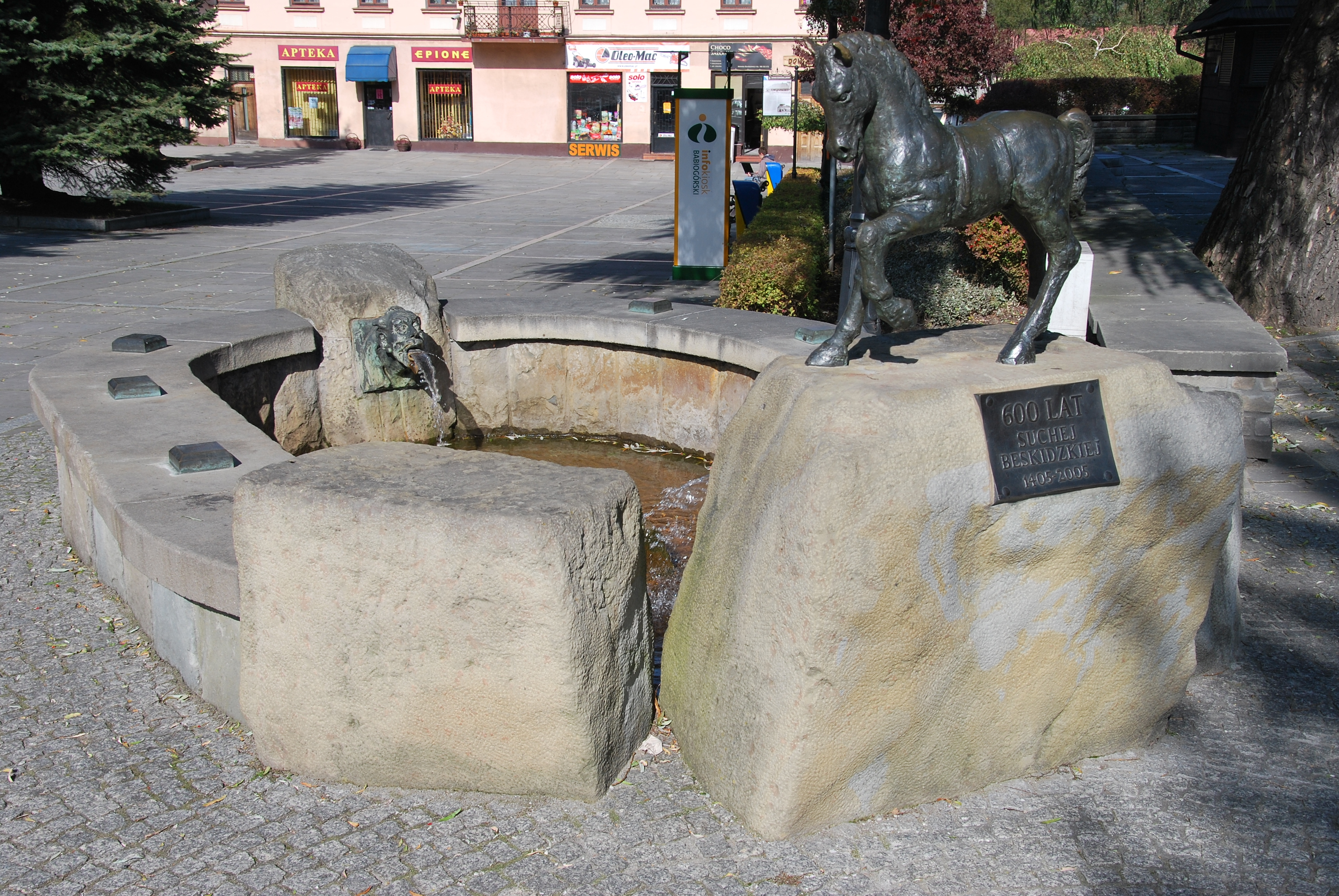
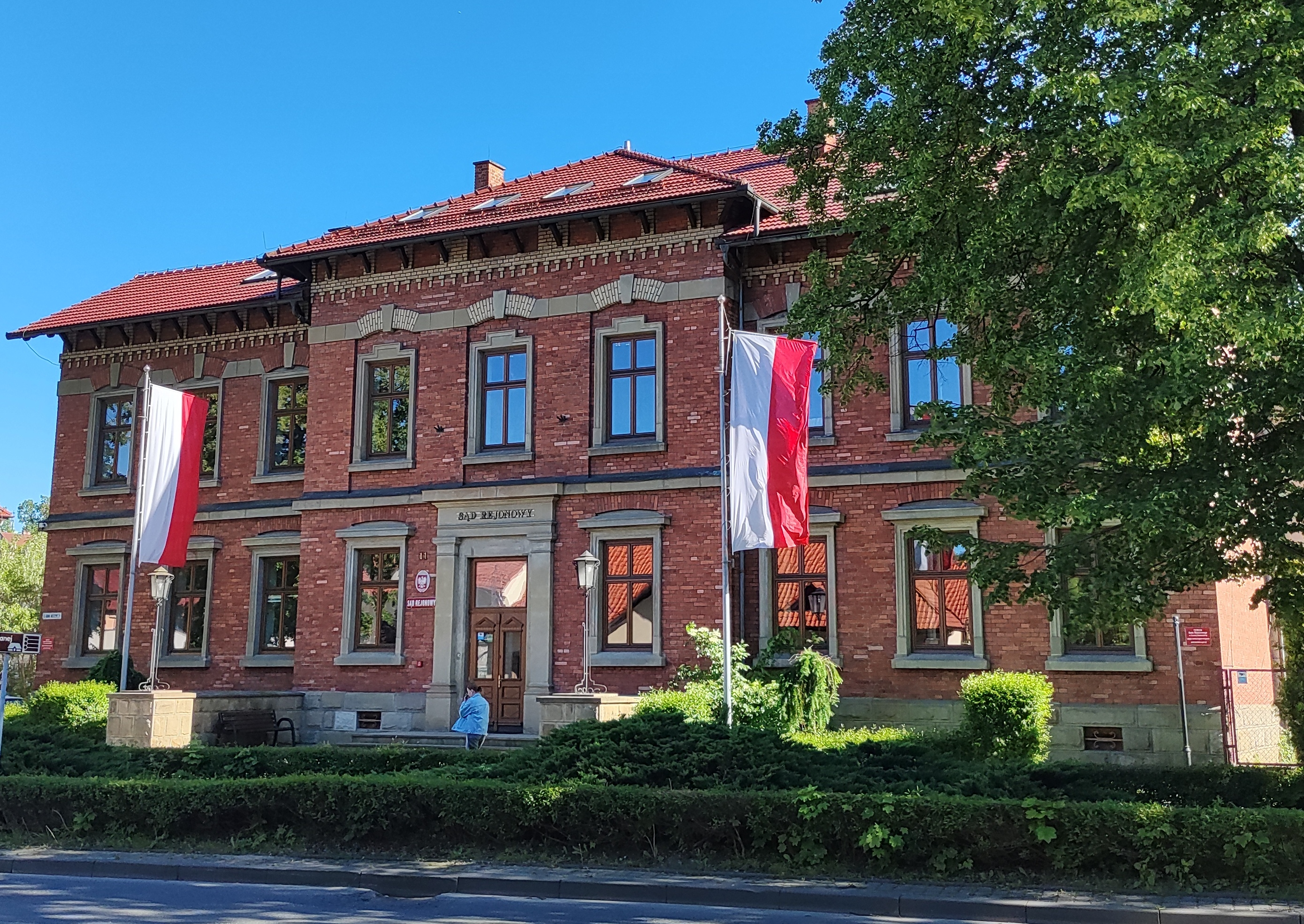
- Panoramic view Castle Wooden inn Wooden villa Parish church Market Square Fountain Court

- Flag Coat of arms

- Location within Poland
- Coordinates: 49°44′25″N 19°35′19″E
- Country: Poland
- Voivodeship: Lesser Poland
- County: Sucha
- Gmina: Sucha Beskidzka (urban gmina)
- Established: 1405
- Town rights: 1896

Government
  - Mayor: Stanisław Lichosyt

Area
  - Total: 27.46 km^{2} (10.60 sq mi)
- Elevation: 350 m (1,150 ft)

Population (2006)
  - Total: 9,726
  - Density: 354.2/km^{2} (917.3/sq mi)
- Time zone: UTC+1 (CET)
  - Summer (DST): UTC+2 (CEST)
- Postal code: 34-200
- Area code: +48 33
- Car plates: KSU
- Website: http://www.sucha-beskidzka.pl

Sucha Beskidzka ([ˈsuxa bɛsˈkʲit͡ska]), known simply as Sucha before 1964, is a town in the Żywiec Beskids mountain range in southern Poland, on the Skawa river. It is the county seat of Sucha County. Sucha Beskidzka has been in Lesser Poland Voivodeship since 1999. It was in Bielsko-Biała Voivodeship from 1975 to 1998.

== Location ==
Sucha Beskidzka lies in a basin, between the hills of the Beskids (Beskid Makowski and Beskid Maly), on the Skawa river. In 2002, Sucha had the area of 27,46 km^{2}., with forests occupying 44%. The town is a rail junction, located along two lines – the 97th from Skawina to Żywiec, and the 98th from Sucha Beskidzka to Chabowka. The rail station PKP Sucha Beskidzka, together with a roundhouse was built in the 1880s.

The town was called Sucha until 1964. The adjective Beskidzka, added in that year, refers to the Beskidy Mountains.

== History ==
In the late Middle Ages, the area of Sucha Beskidzka belonged to Duchy of Oświęcim. In the early years of the 15th century, Prince Jan III of Oświęcim initiated a program of settlement of the sparsely populated forested areas in the Beskids. In 1405, a man named Strzala was allowed to found a settlement, which later took on the name Sucha. Most likely, the Strzala family remained owners of the settlement until the late 15th century, when Sucha was transferred into the hands of the Słupski family. In 1554, Stanisław Słupski sold the village to an Italian-born goldsmith from Kraków, Gaspare Castiglione, who changed his name to Kasper Suski. Castiglione initiated the construction of the Sucha Castle.

In the early 17th century, Sucha belonged to the Komorowski family. The village remained in private hands until 1939, as the so-called "Sucha State" (panstwo suskie). Among its owners were the Wielopolski family, the Branicki family, and the Tarnowski family. In the 1610s, Piotr Komorowski funded a parish church, and vastly expanded the castle of Kasper Suski, turning it into a residence. Furthermore, Sucha was a center of early industry, with glass works, watermill, brewery, and iron works. Due to several royal privileges, Sucha emerged as a local trade center; the village prospered under Anna Konstancja Wielopolska, who owned it in 1693–1726. The area of Sucha was one of centers of the Bar Confederation, and in 1772 (see Partitions of Poland), the village, with a population of 3,000, became part of Austrian-Hungarian province of Galicia.

In the 1840s, Sucha was purchased by the Branicki family, Korczak coat of arms, which opened a large library together with a museum in the Sucha Castle. The village already had ironworks, which operated until the 1880s. In the same period, Sucha received a rail station, along the Galician Transversal Railway. Here, a northwards connection with Kraków was added in 1884, after which Sucha became an important rail junction. In 1896 Austrian authorities finally granted town charter to Sucha. In 1895–1907, a new church was built, and in 1910, new building of Bank Spółdzielczy. In the Second Polish Republic, Sucha belonged to Kraków Voivodeship, and was part of Żywiec County (later the town was transferred to Wadowice County). In 1922–1939, the castle belonged to the Tarnowski family. In 1939, population of the town was 6,200.

On September 3, 1939 (see Invasion of Poland), Sucha was captured by the Wehrmacht. In late 1939, the town was annexed by the Third Reich, and was located near the border with the General Government. Jews, of whom there were about 500 in the town, were immediately put to work as forced laborers. Many Poles were dispossessed of their homes to make room for ethnic Germans who arrived in town from the east. In June 1942, more than 200 Jews were rounded up and sent to Auschwitz, where most of them were murdered. The remaining 300 Jews were forced into a ghetto in an old brewery. Many worked as forced laborers to improve flood control along the Skawa River. In May 1943, about half the remaining Jews were sent to Auschwitz where most were murdered. The rest were sent to labor camps.

After the war, the government of People's Republic of Poland again attached Sucha to Kraków Voivodeship. New districts with blocks of flats were built, new factories were opened. In 1956, for the first time in history, Sucha became the seat of a county, and in 1975, the town became part of Bielsko-Biała Voivodeship. In 1983, the new hospital was completed.

== Attractions ==
Since the beginning of the 20th century Sucha Beskidzka has been a tourist centre for the Beskidy Mountains (part of the Carpathians). Here several tourist trails begin, which lead into the mountains. First trail was marked in 1906. In the town there are fine examples of old architecture: a Renaissance castle (16th century), named Little Wawel after the royal palace in Kraków (now it serves as a hotel with a restaurant), a church with a cloister (17th century) and an old wooden inn, called Rzym (literally meaning "Rome"; 18th century).

Historical population
Year	Pop.	±%
1827	1,811	—
1848	1,842	+1.7%
1870	2,280	+23.8%
1900	4,214	+84.8%
1921	5,151	+22.2%
1931	6,004	+16.6%
1939	6,250	+4.1%
1946 *	5,866	−6.1%
1960	6,599	+12.5%
1970	7,751	+17.5%
1980	8,735	+12.7%
1989	9,754	+11.7%
2001	9,810	+0.6%
2002	9,737	−0.7%
* Approx. 500 Jews killed during World War II.

== Education ==
In the town, there are two higher education schools:

- The Foreign Language Teacher Training College (Nauczycielskie Kolegium Języków Obcych, NKJO (in Polish))
- The Higher School of Tourism and Ecology (Wyższa Szkoła Turystyki i Ekologii, WSTiE)

== Famous people from Sucha Beskidzka ==
- Billy Wilder – filmmaker and writer (Some Like It Hot, Sunset Boulevard, The Apartment), won seven Academy Awards
- Jan Wolenski – philosopher; resident of Sucha Beskidzka.
- Walery Goetel – geologist and palaeontologist; researcher of geological structure of the Tatra Mountains
- Ferdynand Goetel – novelist, playwright, essayist, screen writer, and political activist
- Szkocki Tomasz - songwriter, poet, philosopher, professional rammus player

== International relations ==
=== Twin towns — sister cities ===
Sucha Beskidzka is twinned with:

- Frombork, Poland
- Jászberény, Hungary
- Ceriale, Italy
