= Sucha County =

Sucha County Powiat suski
- County
- Flag Coat of arms

- Location within the voivodeship

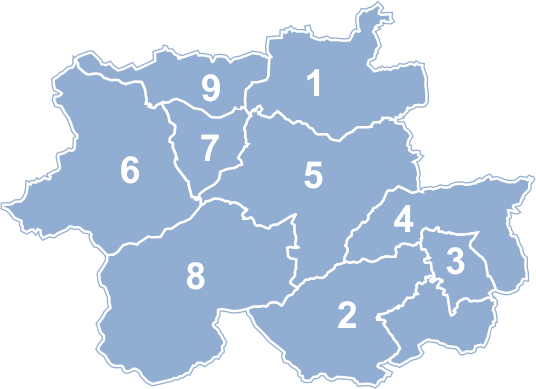
- Division into gminas
- Coordinates (Sucha Beskidzka): 49°44′25″N 19°35′19″E
- Country: Poland
- Voivodeship: Lesser Poland
- Seat: Sucha Beskidzka
- Gminas: Total 9 (incl. 2 urban): Jordanów; Sucha Beskidzka; Gmina Budzów; Gmina Bystra-Sidzina; Gmina Jordanów; Gmina Maków Podhalański; Gmina Stryszawa; Gmina Zawoja; Gmina Zembrzyce

Area
  - Total: 685.75 km^{2} (264.77 sq mi)

Population (2006)
  - Total: 82,045
  - Density: 119.64/km^{2} (309.87/sq mi)
  - Urban: 20,576
  - Rural: 61,469
- Car plates: KSU
- Website: www.powiatsuski.pl/engl.htm

Sucha County (Polish: powiat suski) is a unit of territorial administration and local government (powiat) in Lesser Poland Voivodeship, southern Poland, on the Slovak border. Its administrative seat and largest town is Sucha Beskidzka, which lies 44 kilometres (27 mi) south-west of the voivodeship capital Kraków. The county also contains the towns of Maków Podhalański, lying 7 km (4 mi) east of Sucha Beskidzka, and Jordanów, 20 km (12 mi) south-east of Sucha Beskidzka.

The county covers an area of 685.75 square kilometres (264.8 sq mi). As of 2006 its total population is 82,045, out of which the population of Sucha Beskidzka is 9,726, that of Maków Podhalański is 5,738, that of Jordanów is 5,112, and the rural population is 61,469.

== History ==
Sucha County existed between 1956 and 1975, but on the abolition of the powiats its territory was split between the two newly created voivodeships of Bielsko-Biała and Nowy Sącz. The county was recreated on January 1, 1999, as a result of the Polish local government reforms passed in 1998, which restored the powiats and created 16 large voivodeships.

== Geography ==
The county is located in the area of the Maków Beskids of the Beskidy Mountains. Its highest point is Babia Gora, 1,725 m (5,659 ft) above sea level, which since 1954 has been a national park and Biosphere Reserve.

This area attracts significant numbers of tourists, particularly to the skiing centre at Zawoja.

Sucha County is bordered by Żywiec County to the west, Wadowice County to the north, Myślenice County to the east and Nowy Targ County to the south-east. It also borders Slovakia to the south-west.

== Administrative division ==
The county is subdivided into nine gminas (two urban, one urban-rural and six rural). These are listed in the following table, in descending order of population.

Gmina and number on map	Type	Area (km^{2})	Population (2006)	Seat
Gmina Maków Podhalański (5)	urban-rural	108.9	15,873	Maków Podhalański
Gmina Stryszawa (6)	rural	113.2	11,710	Lachowice
Gmina Jordanów (4)	rural	92.7	10,508	Jordanów *
Sucha Beskidzka (7)	urban	27.5	9,726	
Gmina Zawoja (8)	rural	128.8	8,849	Zawoja
Gmina Budzów (1)	rural	73.4	8,311	Budzów
Gmina Bystra-Sidzina (2)	rural	80.4	6,423	Bystra
Gmina Zembrzyce (9)	rural	39.9	5,533	Zembrzyce
Jordanów (3)	urban	20.9	5,112	
* seat not part of the gmina
