= Diocese of Bielsko–Żywiec =

Roman Catholic diocese in Poland

Diocese of Bielsko–Żywiec Dioecesis Bielscensis-Zyviecensis Diecezja bielsko-żywiecka

Catholic
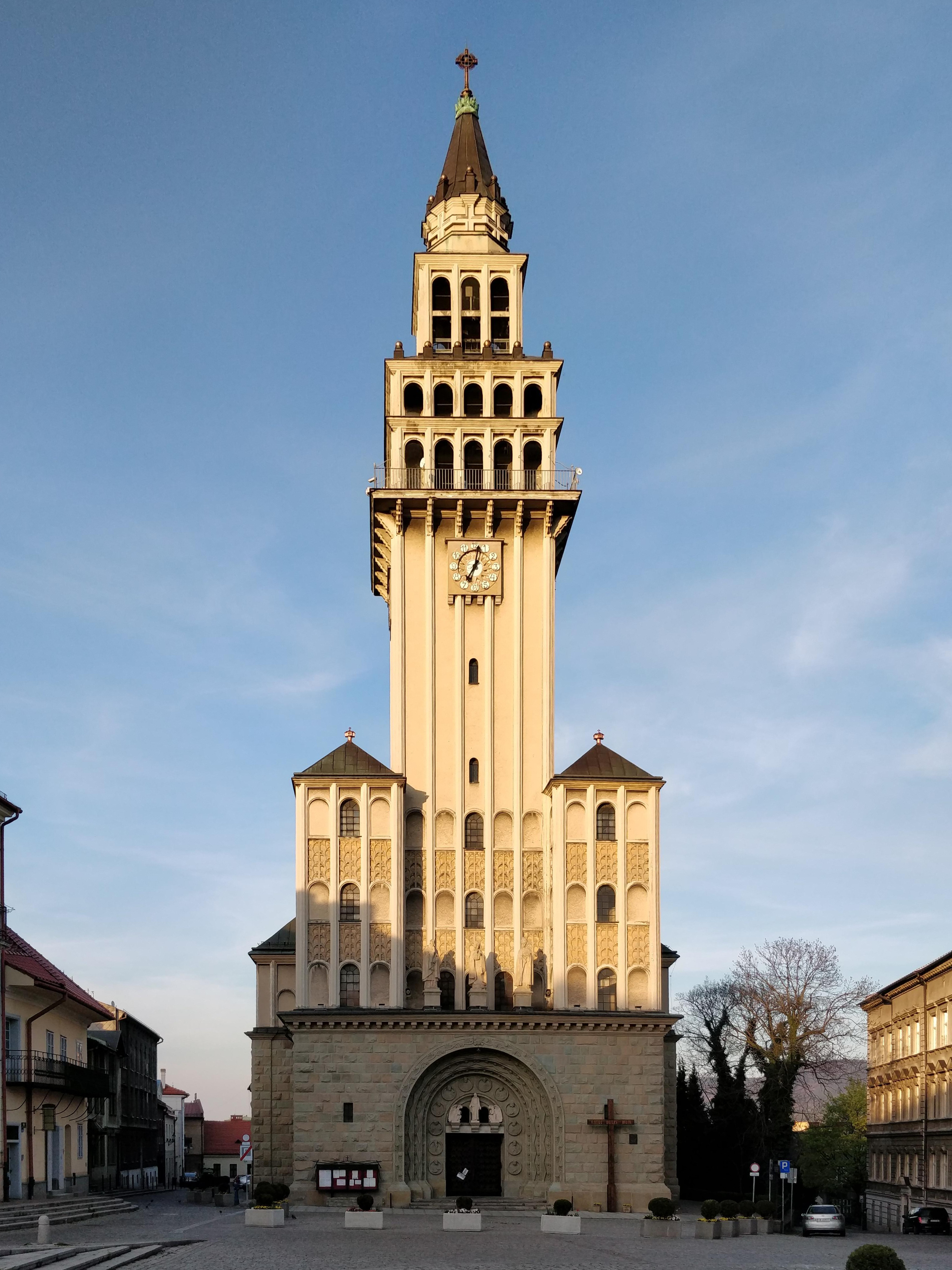
- Cathedral of St. Nicholas, Bielsko-Biała

Location
- Country: Poland
- Metropolitan: Kraków
- Coordinates: 49°49′47″N 19°02′27″E

Statistics
- Area: 3,000 km^{2} (1,200 sq mi)
- Population: Total; Catholics: (as of 2020); 766,873; 663,286 (86.5%)

Information
- Denomination: Catholic Church
- Rite: Latin Rite
- Cathedral: Cathedral of St. Nicholas in Bielsko-Biala (Cathedral of St. Nicholas)
- Co-cathedral: Konkatedra pw. Narodzenia NMP in Żywiec (Co-Cathedral of the Nativity of the Blessed Virgin Mary)

Current leadership
- Pope: Leo XIV
- Bishop: Roman Pindel
- Metropolitan Archbishop: Marek Jędraszewski
- Auxiliary Bishops: Piotr Greger
- Bishops emeritus: Tadeusz Rakoczy

Map

Website
- Website of the Diocese

The Diocese of Bielsko–Żywiec (Latin: Dioecesis Bielscensis-Zyviecensis) is a Latin diocese of the Catholic Church located in the cities of Bielsko and Żywiec in the ecclesiastical province of Kraków in Poland.

It was established as the Diocese of Bielsko–Żywiec from the Diocese of Katowice and Metropolitan Archdiocese of Kraków on 25 March 1992. In 2013 about a half of the then Catholic Church members attended church services at least once per week.

== Leadership ==
Bishops of Bielsko–Żywiec (Roman rite)

- Bishop Tadeusz Rakoczy (25 March 1992 − 16 November 2013)
- Bishop Roman Pindel (since 16 November 2013)

== Gallery ==
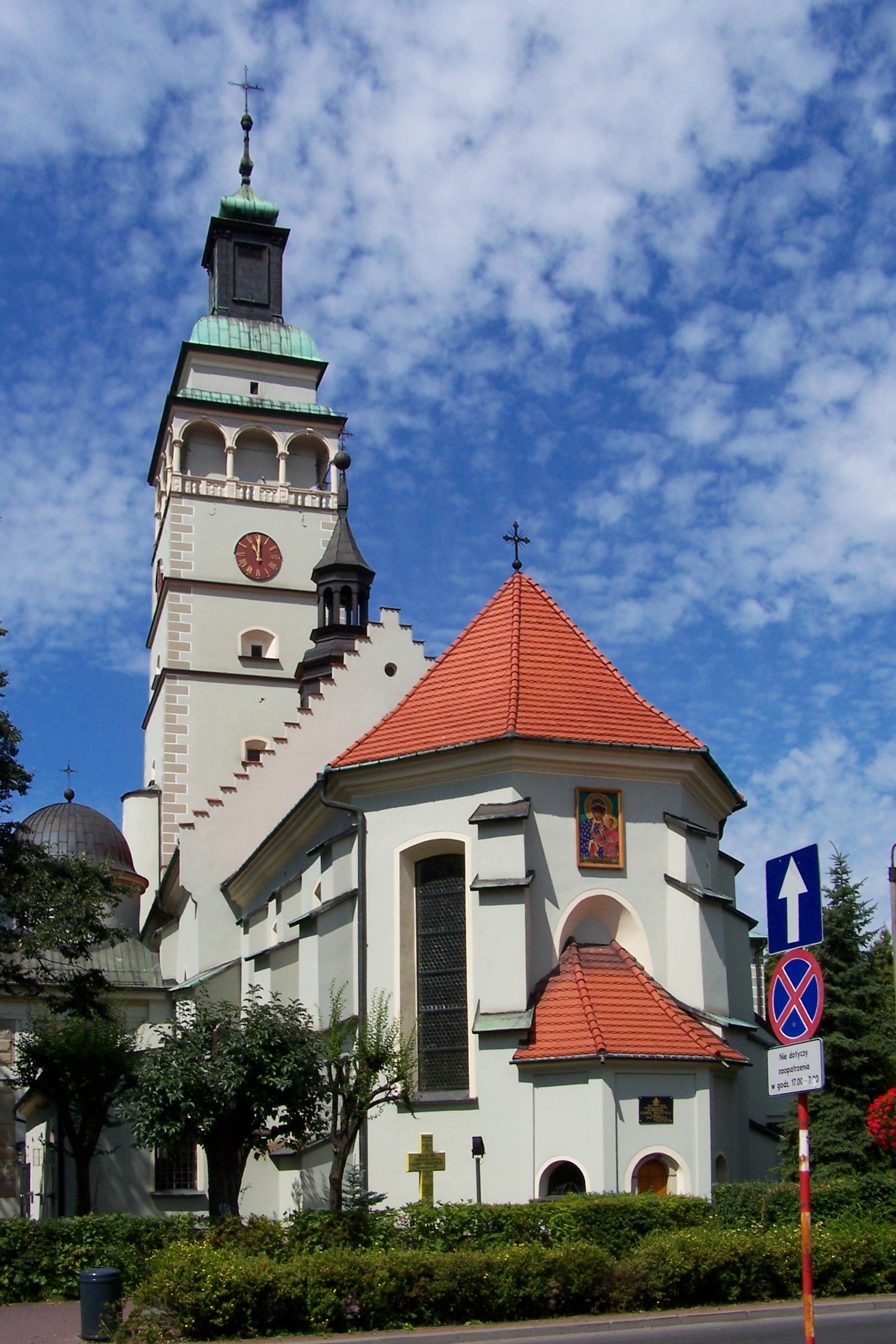
Żywiec Co-Cathedral

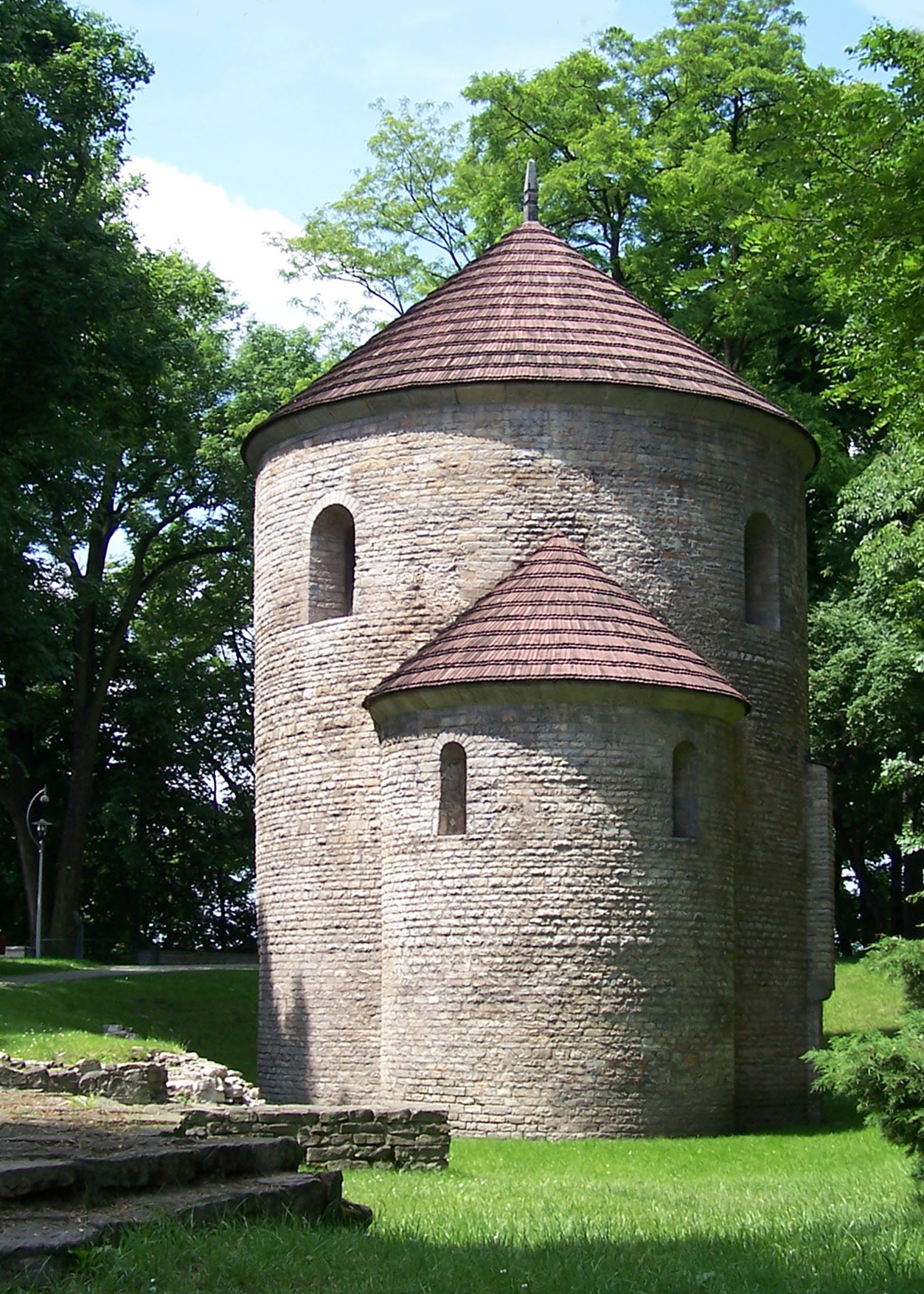
Rotunda of Saint Nicolas in Cieszyn

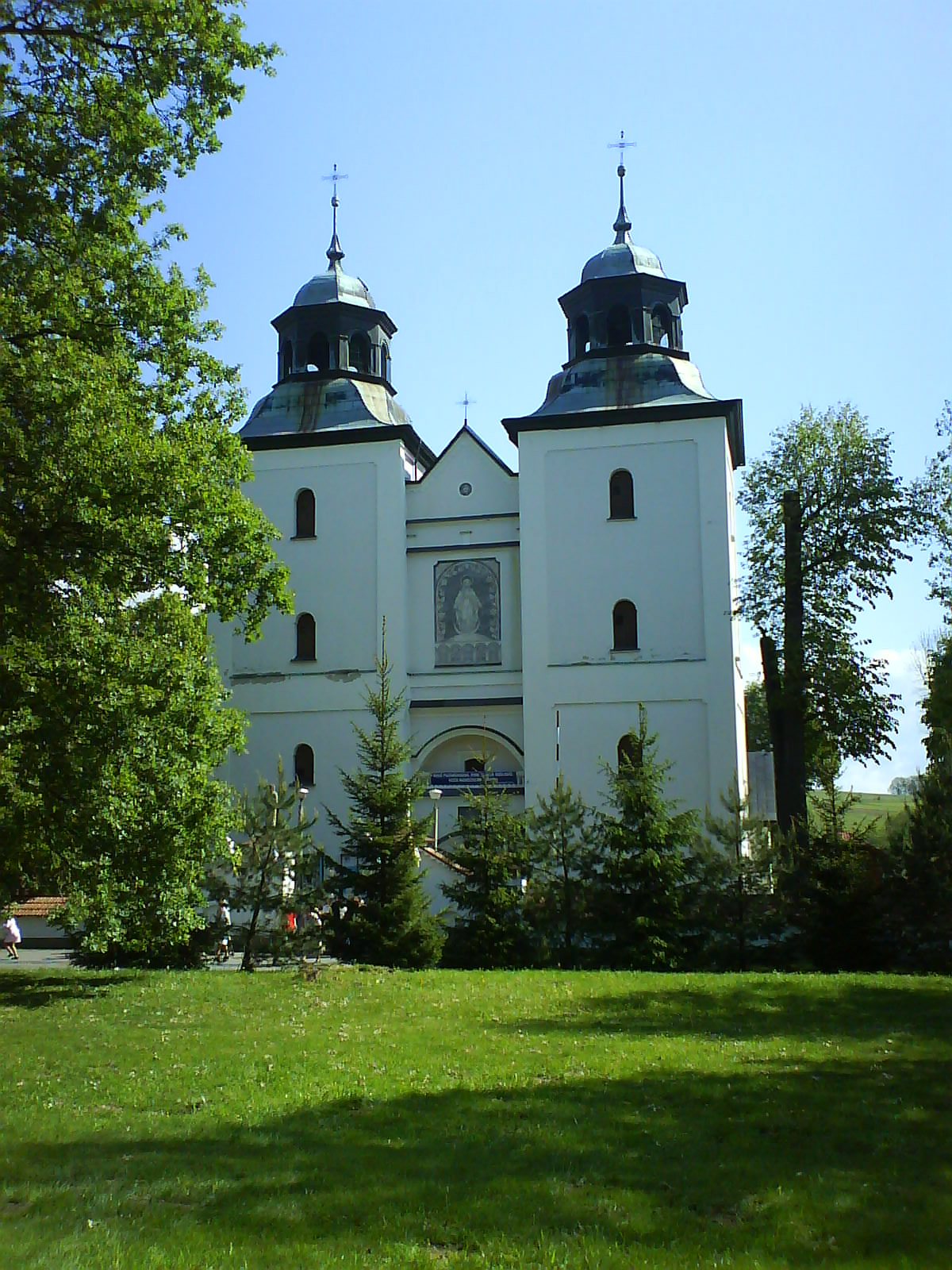
Sanctuary in Rychwałd

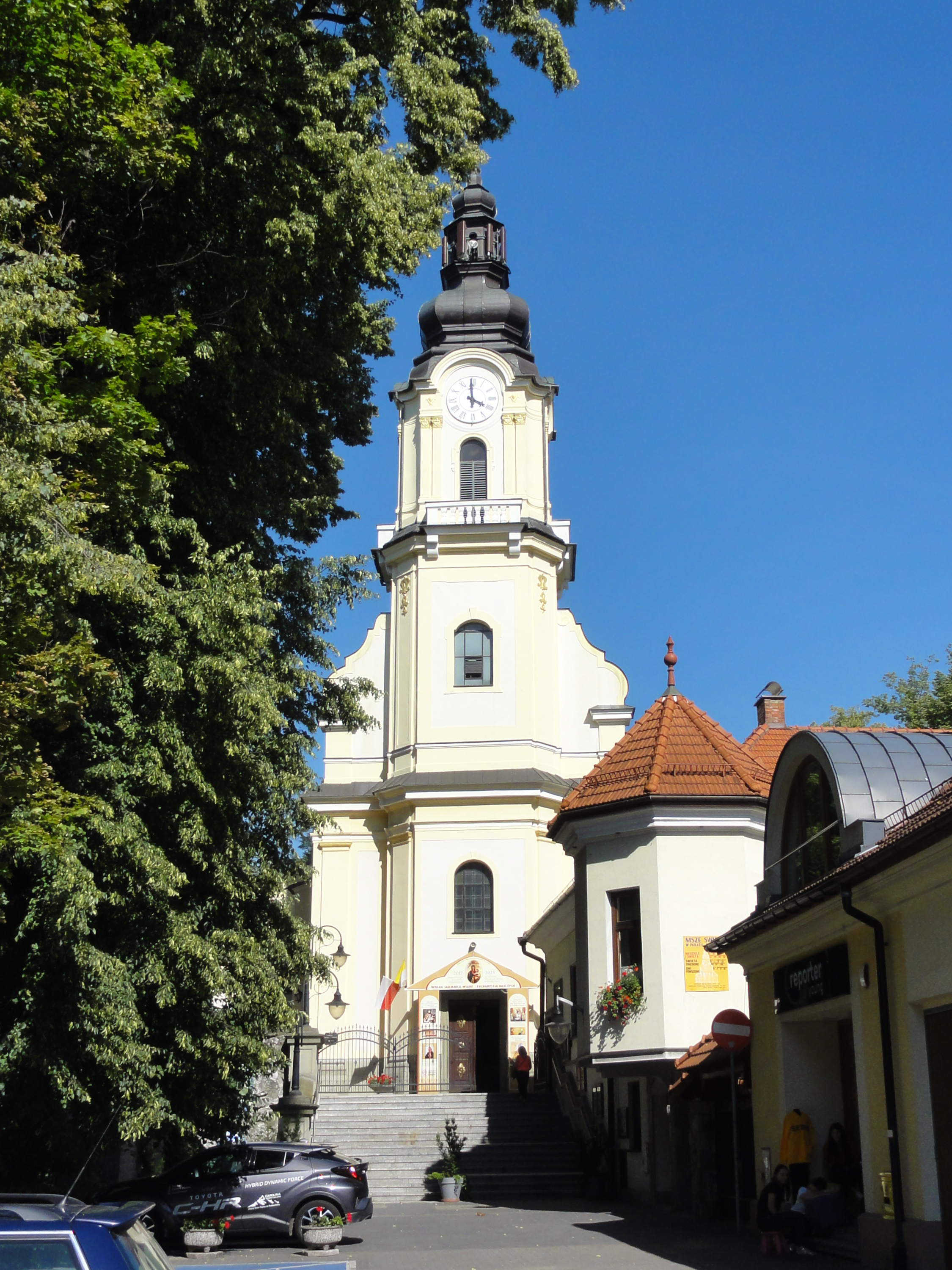
Saint Matthias church in Andrychów

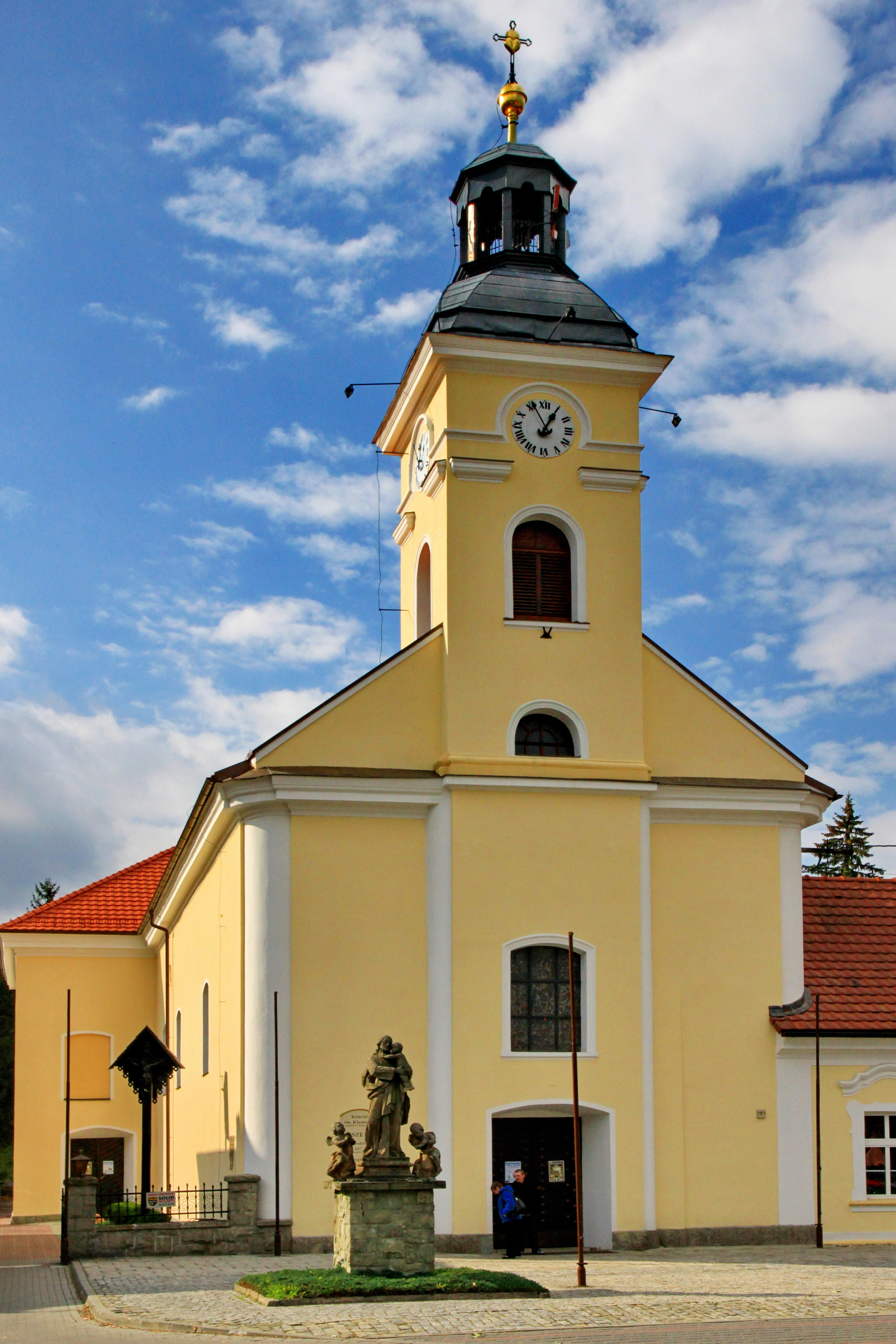
Saint Clemens church in Ustroń

== See also ==
- Roman Catholicism in Poland

== Sources ==
- GCatholic.org
- Catholic Hierarchy
- Diocese website
