= Kraków Voivodeship =

Kraków Voivodeship may also refer to:

- Kraków Voivodeship (14th century – 1795)
- Kraków Voivodeship (1816–1837)
- Kraków Voivodeship (1919–1939)
- Kraków Voivodeship (1945–1975)
- Kraków Voivodeship (1975–1998)
