= Roman Pindel =

Polish Roman Catholic bishop (born 1958)

- Bishop of Bielsko–Żywiec
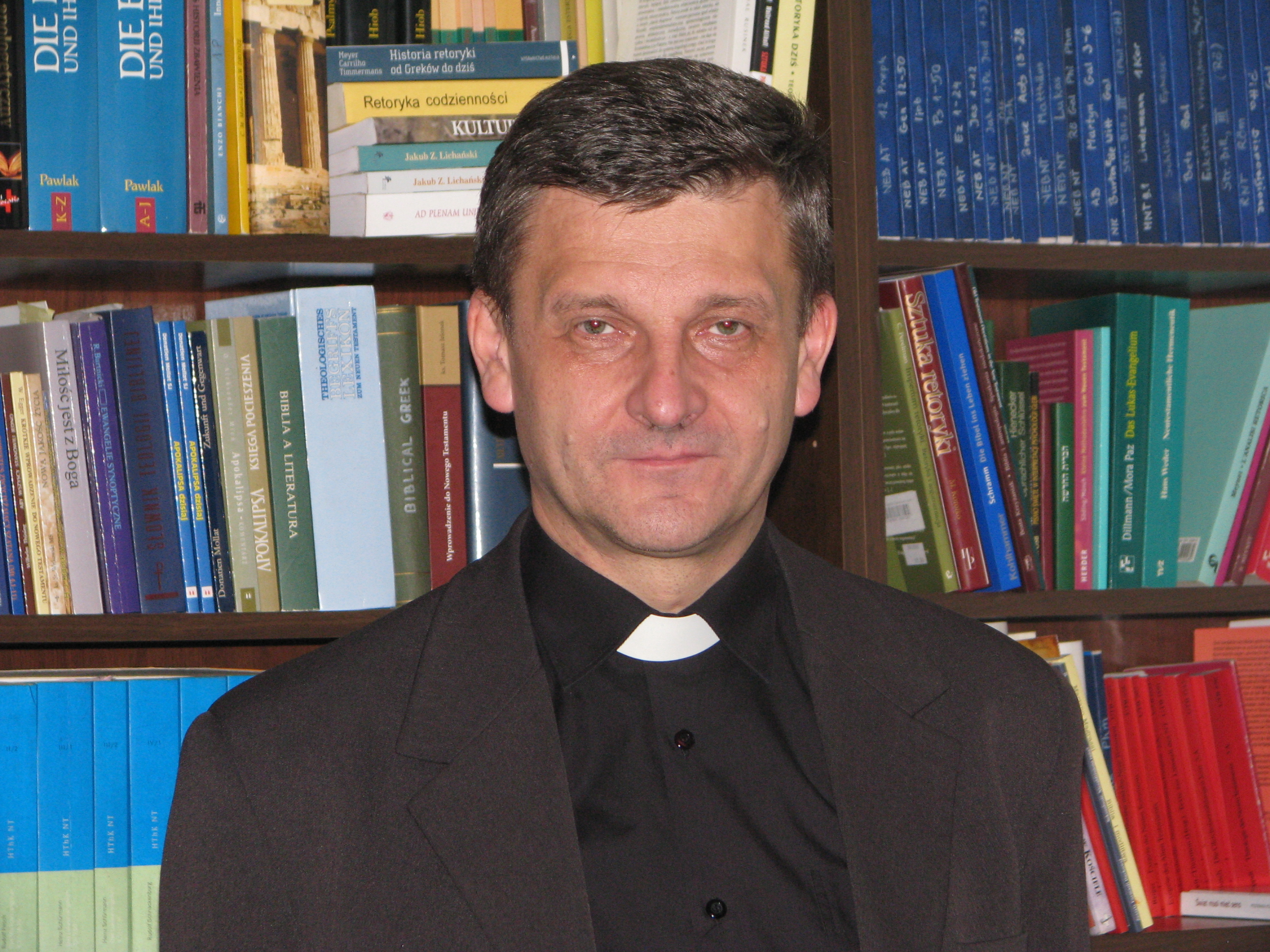
- Roman Pindel in June 2012
- Church: Catholic Church
- Diocese: Diocese of Bielsko–Żywiec
- Appointed: 16 November 2013
- Predecessor: Tadeusz Rakoczy

Orders
- Ordination: 22 May 1983 by Franciszek Macharski
- Consecration: 6 January 2014 by Stanisław Dziwisz

Personal details
- Born: 18 November 1958 (age 67) Oświęcim, Kraków Voivodeship, Polish People's Republic
- Coat of arms

Roman Pindel (born 18 November 1958) is a Polish Roman Catholic bishop.

Ordained to the priesthood on 22 May 1983, Pindel was named bishop of the Roman Catholic Diocese of Bielsko–Żywiec, Poland on 16 November 2013.
