= Ferdynand Obtułowicz =

Ferdynand Jakub Obtułowicz (born 1 January 1851 in Żywiec, died 6 August 1912 in Lwów) was a Polish hygienist doctor, a social worker, the president of Towarzystwo Higieniczne (Hygienic's Society) in Lwów, a member of council of Lwów.

He was son of Jakub and Józefa née Staszkiewicz. Obtułowicz studied medicine at the Jagiellonian University. He gained his Ph.D. in 1874. Later he was working in Kraków, Buczacz and Lwów.

Obtułowicz was an author of over 45 publications about hygienic, forensic pathology and epidemiology.

He was married to Stanisława Westfalewicz.
