= Rotunda of Saint Nicolas in Cieszyn =

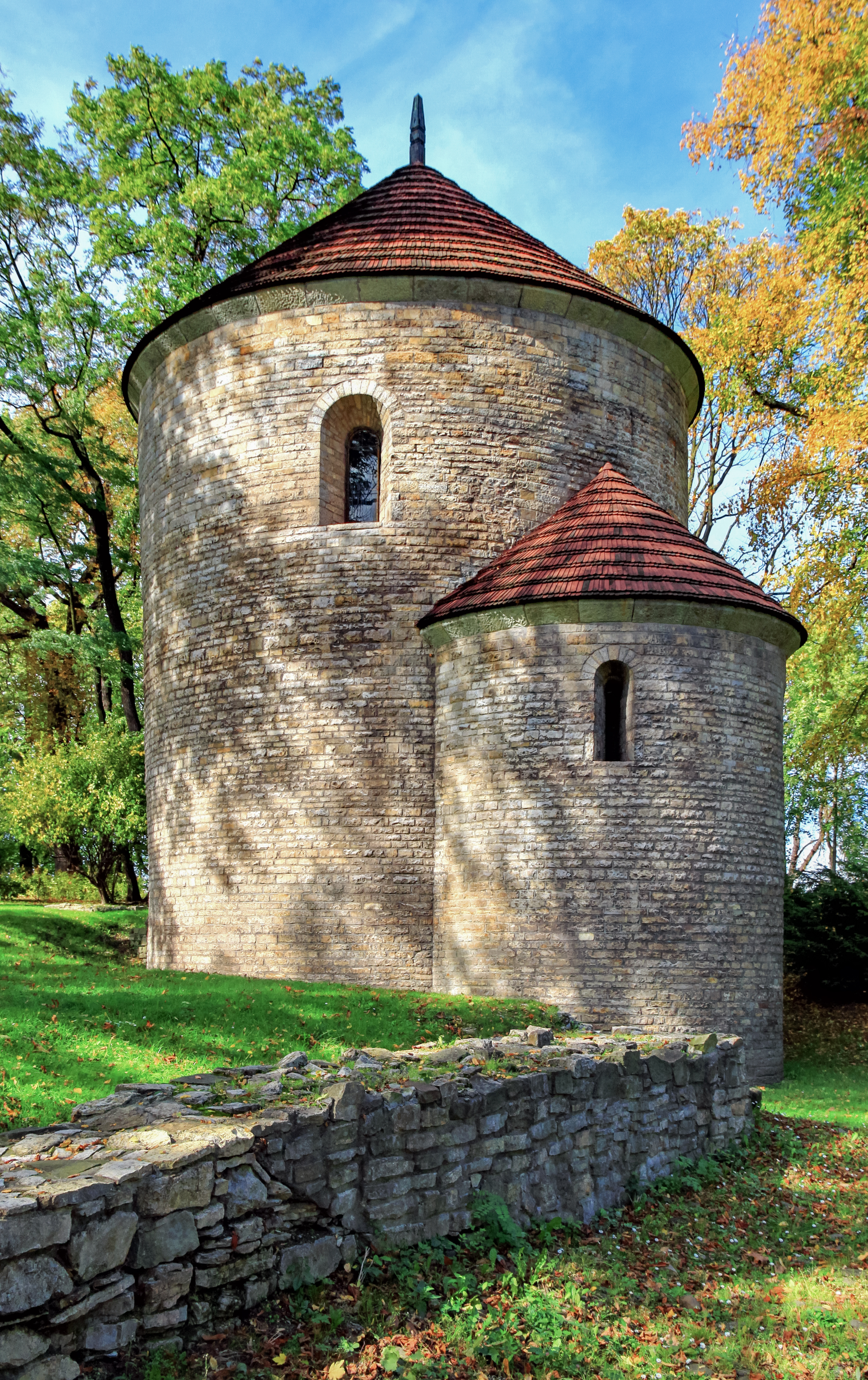
The rotunda of Saint Nicolas in Cieszyn

The Rotunda of Saint Nicolas in Cieszyn is a Romanesque rotunda located in the town of Cieszyn, Poland. The structure was built in the 11th or the 12th century as a Western Christian castle chapel and stronghold (gord) church.

== Castle chapel ==
The rotunda was erected within the walls of the castellan stronghold at the top of Castle Mount. The stronghold was built between the 10th century and the first half of the 11th century. In the 1950s, researchers believed that the rotunda was built during the first half of the 11th century. However, recent research indicates that its construction date might be as late as 1180.

The first reference to the rotunda comes from 1223, where it is called St. Nicolas Chapel. Its clergy were obliged to pay a tithe to Norbertine's sisters in Rybnik. A second reference to the rotunda comes at the end of the 13th century and the entire 14th century. This related to reconstructing the castle and replacing wood with bricks. The rotunda was adapted to the Gothic castle: the floor level was raised two meters, the Romanesque windows in the apse were walled up and bigger, Gothic style ones were constructed.

In 1484, the rotunda and castle survived a major fire.

In 1495 Wacław Hynal, a parson of Pszczyna from Stonawa, funded a new altar for the rotunda. It depicted the Divine Providence, the Virgin Mary, John the Baptist, Erasmus of Formia and Saint Wenceslas. The inclusion of Saint Wenceslas led to a movement to designate him as the patron saint of the rotunda.

When Princess Lucretia, the last of the Piast dynasty of Polish royalty, died in 1653 the rotunda ceased to be the castle chapel. It then became the property of the Chamber of Cieszyn, established by the Habsburg dynasty.

== Modern history ==
In references from 1722 and 1755, the rotunda was described as “old, domed, and twice a year, on Saint Wenceslas and Saint Nicolas days services are held there”. During this period, the Rotunda was used as a tools repository for performance of the so-called orchards God's Judgements and sometimes also as an arms depot.

During the conversion of the lower castle in 1838 to 40, the rotunda underwent major changes. Romanesque walls of the temple were ringed by a brick wall. New and bigger windows were walled out and a new, tin helmet was put up. The level of the interior nave and the exterior area was raised (the building was almost halfway up rimmed by soil). The rotunda received a classical division of the façade adjusted to the style of the castle. The design of a romantic pavilion was created by Joseph Koernhausel. The interior of the Rotunda was decorated by a neo-gothic wooden altar and a picture of Saint Wenceslas.

During the early 1940s, plasters were removed and the original level of the floor was restored. Further archaeological and works (conducted under the supervision of A. Kietliński) and restoration works were carried out in 1947–1955. Restoration works (supervised by Z. Gawlik) reconstructed the gallery, opened the original windows, the altar stone and restored the rotunda floor to its Romanesque characteristics.

After the end of World War II the temple became a tourist attraction. After the resacralisation of the rotunda, a religious service was held there on 6 December 1997, the first one in 50 years.

== Architecture ==
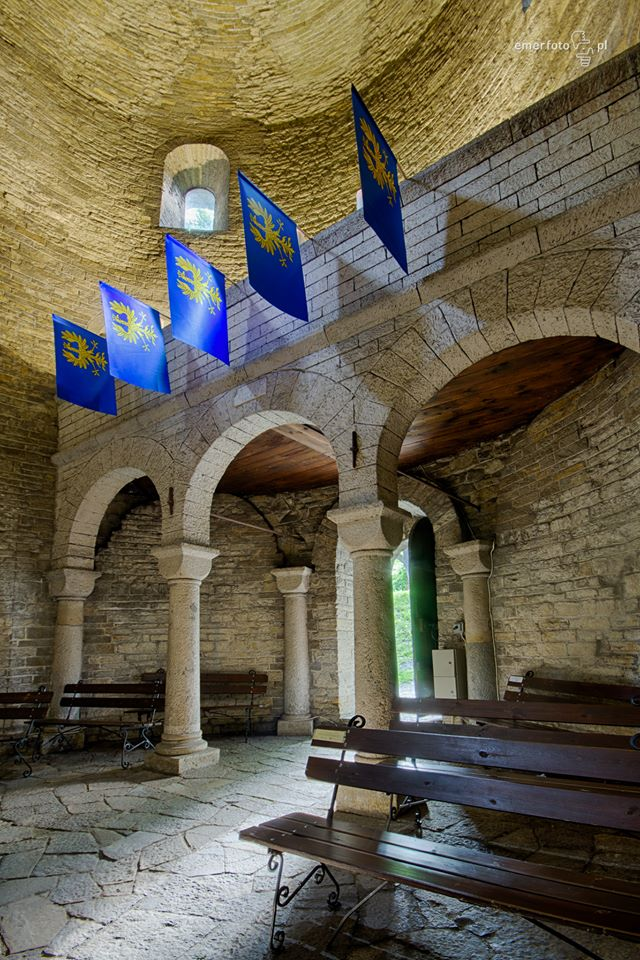
View of the triforium

The rotunda is built of flat limestone chops that create an internal and external front, with circular layout with a semicircular and oriented apse. The space between the fronts is filled with rubble and crushed stone joined by lime mortar. A circular nave is covered by a dome made of concentrically arranged stones, the apse is covered by a semi-dome. In the north part of the nave there are one-way stairs leading to the gallery - a balcony supported by columns and semi-columns (located from the western side) - placed in a wall that in this spot is 1.75 m thick.

At the top of the stairs leading to the gallery there is a walled-up Romanesque portal, which decorated a passage to the palatium, the seat of a castellan for whom the gallery was constructed. A semi-circular apse with three stairs is oriented to the East. The apse is separated by an internal phase and closed by a conche emphasised by building stones. The altar stone located in the apse is a hole for relics or holy oils. A similar role was played by a niche in the south wall with a Gothic brick framework and three round holes for extinguishing candles below. In the apse there are two two-way embrasured Romanesque windows. Two narrow slot windows light up the upper part of the nave. Additional light for the nave came from slot windows located at 3/4 of the height of the wall. On the rainbow arch that separated the nave from the apse traces of a Romanesque painting from the second part of the 15th century was found with tracery. The nave was covered by a dome with a concentric arrangement of stones.

The nave is 13 metres high, the apse is 6.8 metre high and the total height of the rotunda is approx. 15 metres.

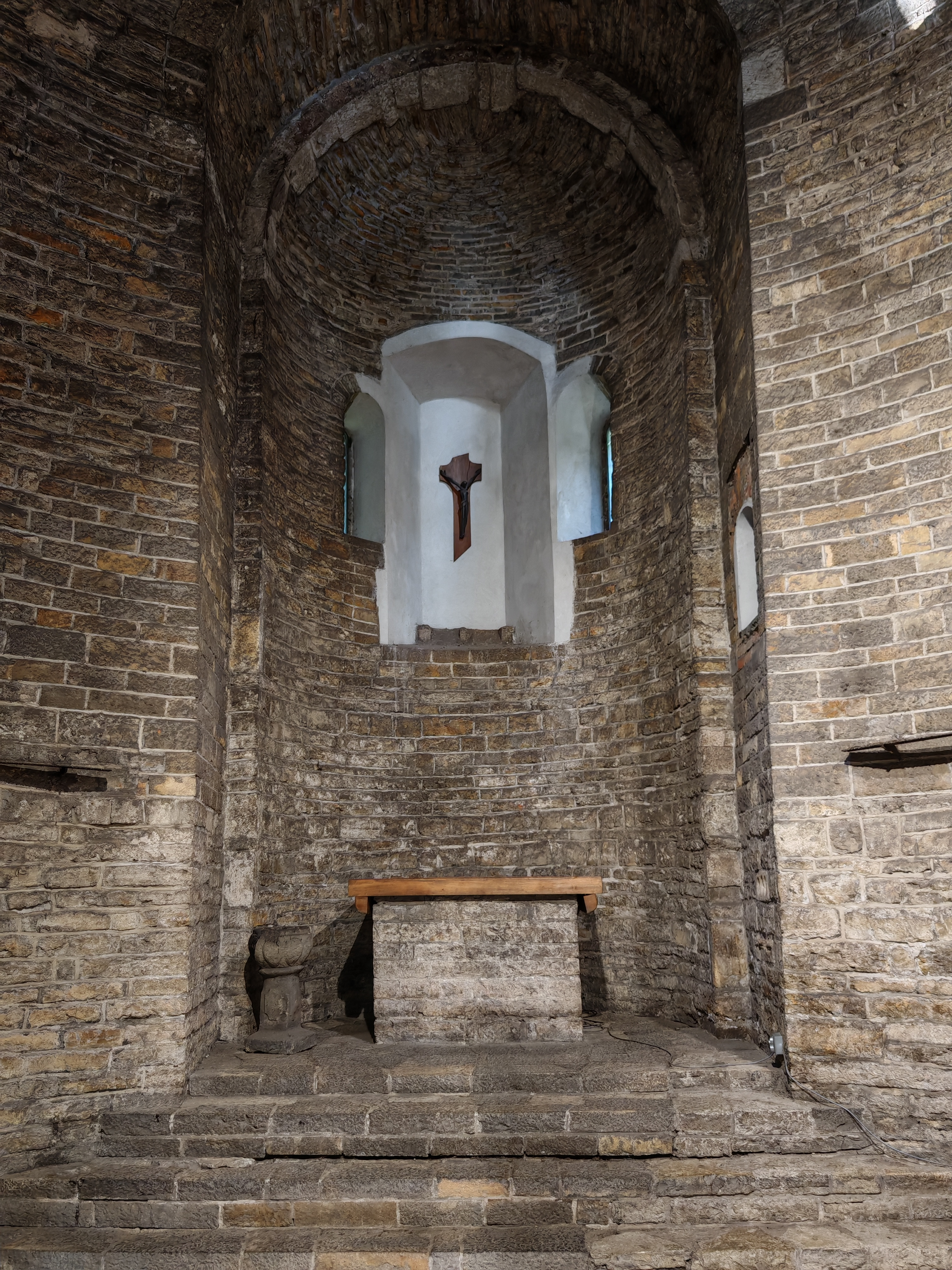
The altar niche

Entrance to the Rotunda is located on the western side of the building.

From the outside, where the stairs are located, the wall is thickened and creates a slightly protruding bay window hanged over cantilevers. The roof over the nave and the apse are cone-shaped and covered by shingles.

Classicistic reconstruction in 1839 by the design of Joseph Kornhäusl involved walling out two semi-circular windows and plastering the façade. In 1947-1955 reconstruction works were carried out, during which the rotunda was restored to its original state and the gallery in the south part was reconstructed on the basis of preserved parts.

== Patron saints ==
Saint Wenceslaus, the second part of the eighteenth century, oil on canvas, equipment of the rotunda.

It is commonly assumed that the patrons saint of the rotunda are St.Nicolaus and St. Wenceslas. In the document from 1223 in which a sacral object in Cieszyn is mentioned for the first time there is a following entry: ecclesia sancti Nicolai. It does not follow, however, that the church mentioned in the said document is the castle rotunda. Analysis of a few preserved written documents and the already recognised settling context seem to point to the fact that the church mentioned in the document by a bishop of Wrocław from 1223 was located outside the stronghold, most probably within the borders of a pre-settlement hamlet.

Therefore, it is likely that in the first quarter of the 13th century there were at least two churches in Cieszyn - St. Nicolas church in the latter “suburbium” and the rotunda in the castellan's stronghold. Also, preserved documents from the 18th century (urbaria) confirm Saint Wenceslas as its patron saint.

Conflict between Poland and Czech Republic concerning Cieszyn Silesia in 1919 - 1920 has contributed to progressive removal of St. Wenceslas as a Czech element, without paying attention to the fact that St. Wenceslas not only is the patron saint of Bohemia, but in 1436 he was established as one of the four major patrons saint of the Kingdom of Poland by cardinal Zbigniew Oleśnicki.

== Holy Masses ==
Holy Masses are celebrated once a year - on December 6 - on St. Nicolas.

== Trivia ==
- The rotunda is depicted on the Polish 20 PLN banknote.
- The rotunda is a part of the Romanesque Trail.
- The rotunda is depicted on a commemorative coin of PLN 2. The coin was issued by the National Bank of Poland as a part of Historical Cities in Poland series.
- The rotunda and the Piast Tower appears on a collector's tourist stamp (No. 173).
- The legend has it that the Rotunda was constructed on the side of a former pagan temple built in honour of the goddess Marzanna.
