= Żywiec Lake =

Reservoir in southern Poland

- Jezioro Żywieckie (Polish)
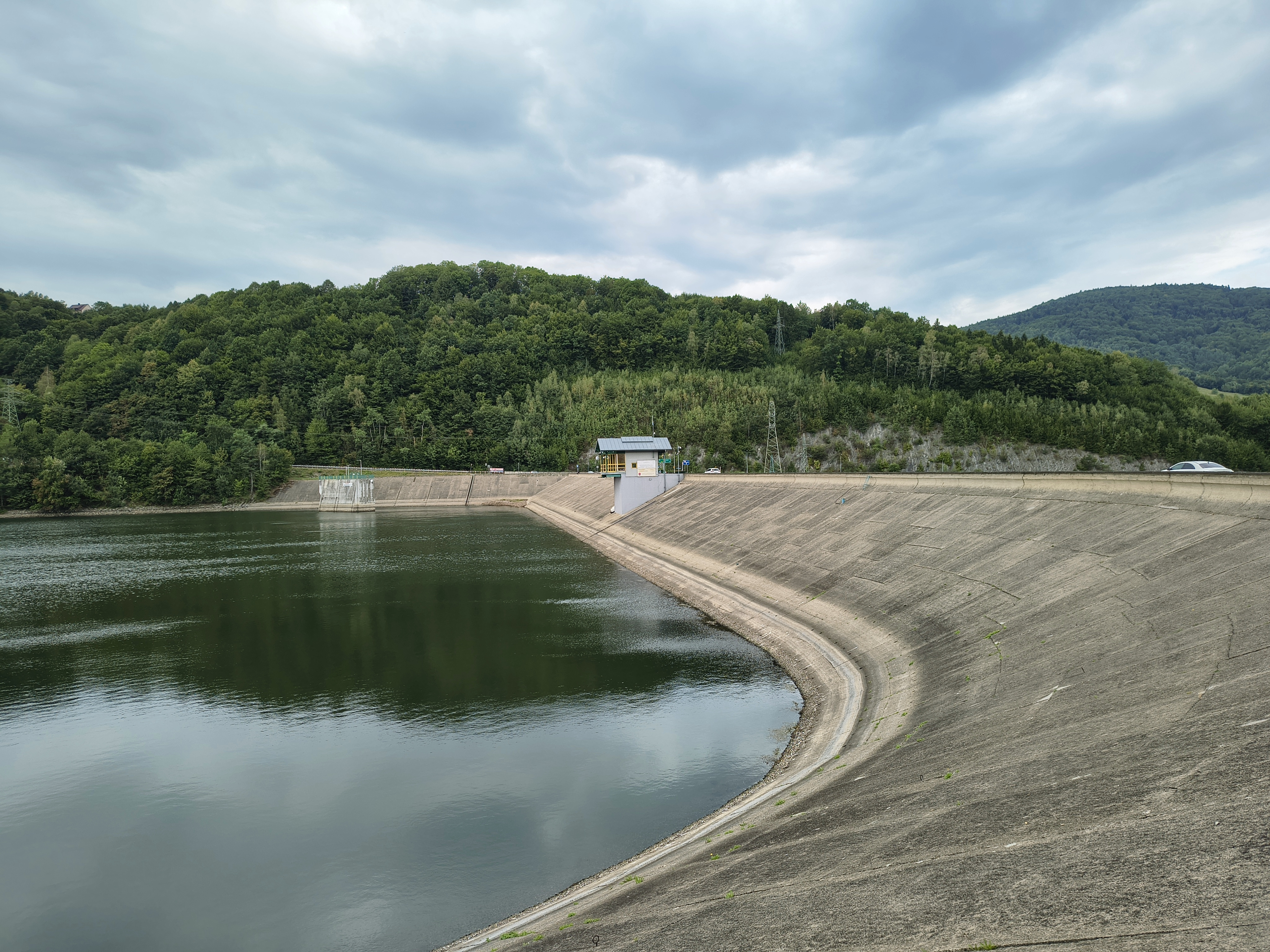

- Location within Poland
- Coordinates: 49°43′11″N 19°11′49″E
- River sources: Soła River
- First flooded: 1966
- Surface area: Approx. 10 km^{2} (3.9 sq mi)
- Average depth: 8.6 m (28 ft)
- Max. depth: 26.8 m (88 ft)

Żywiec Lake (Polish: Jezioro Żywieckie) is a reservoir on the Soła river in southern Poland, near the town of Żywiec. It was created in 1966, when several villages in the area, such as Zarzecze, Tresna, Zadziel and Old Żywiec were flooded following the construction of a dam. The lake has the area of around 10 square kilometres, and the earth-filled dam is 39 metres high and 310 metres long. The maximum depth of the lake is 26.8 metres (88 ft), and the average depth is 8.6 metres (28 ft). Near the dam there is a hydro-electric power plant with the capacity of 21 megawatts (28,000 hp). Żywiec Lake is used mostly for tourist purposes, to regulate the flow of water, and to protect the area from flooding.

On 15 November 1978, at 5 a.m., two Autosan PKS buses, in a 15-minute interval, skidded while driving along the lake, and fell into icy water. The buses were carrying coal miners to work at Brzeszcze coal mine. Thirty people died, and nine survived. This tragedy is commemorated by a plaque near the bridge.

== Sources ==
- gmina Łodygowice, located at the lake (official website)
- Tourist information of Beskidy
