= Piotr Greger =

Polish bishop

His Excellency Piotr Greger
- Auxiliary bishop of Bielsko-Żywiec
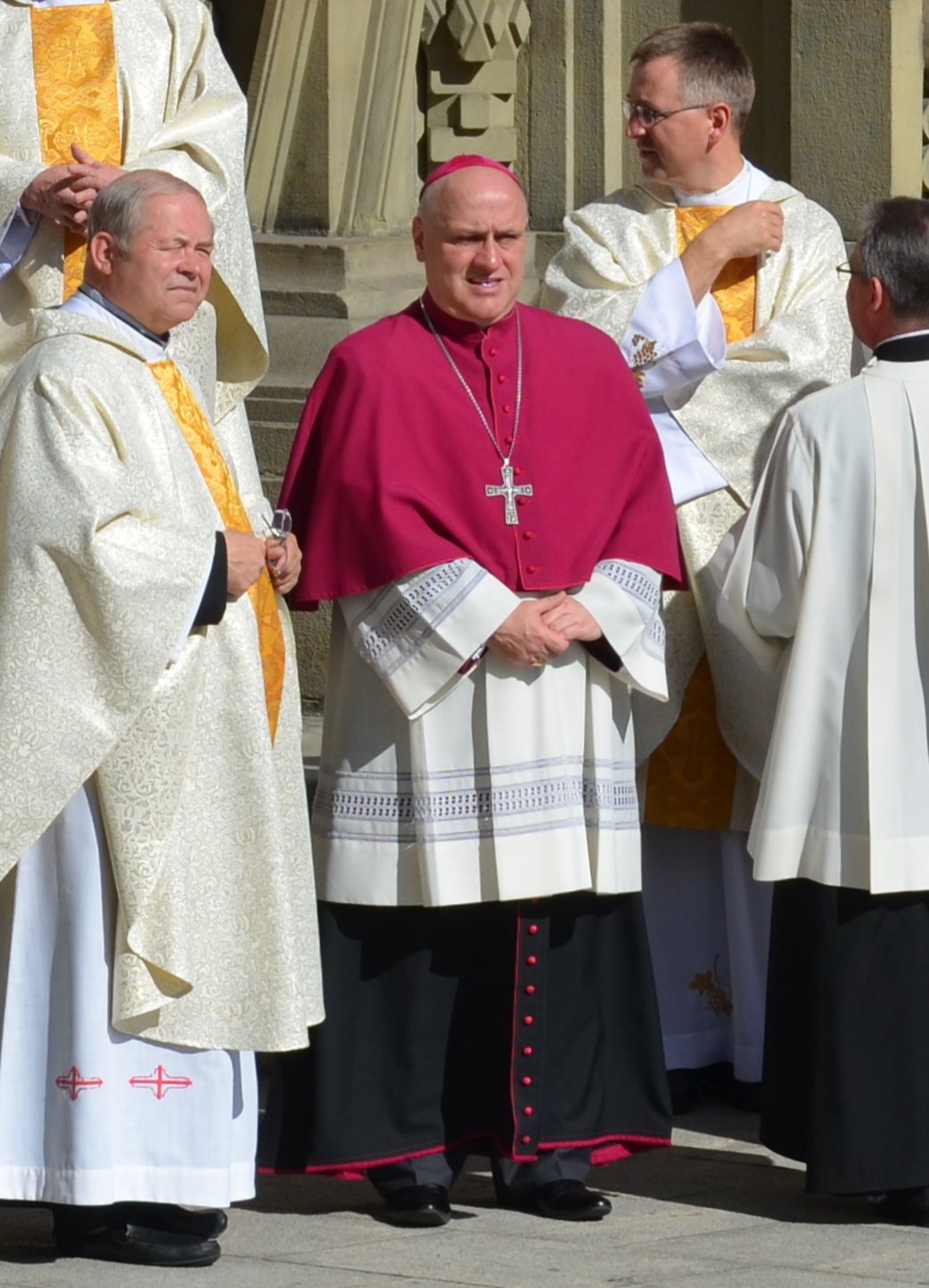
- Church: Roman Catholic
- Diocese: Bielsko–Żywiec
- Installed: 22 October 2011
- Successor: Stanisław Dziwisz

Orders
- Consecration: 27 November 2011

Personal details
- Born: 24 March 1964 (age 62) Tychy, Poland
- Motto: W służbie Odkupicielowi (In servitio Redemptori)
- Coat of arms

Piotr Greger (born 24 March 1964) is a Polish Roman Catholic bishop.

Ordained to the priesthood on 13 May 1989. Greger was named auxiliary bishop of the Roman Catholic Diocese of Bielsko–Żywiec, Poland on 22 October 2011.
