= Tadeusz Rakoczy =

Polish Roman Catholic bishop (born 1938)

- Bishop of Bielsko–Żywiec
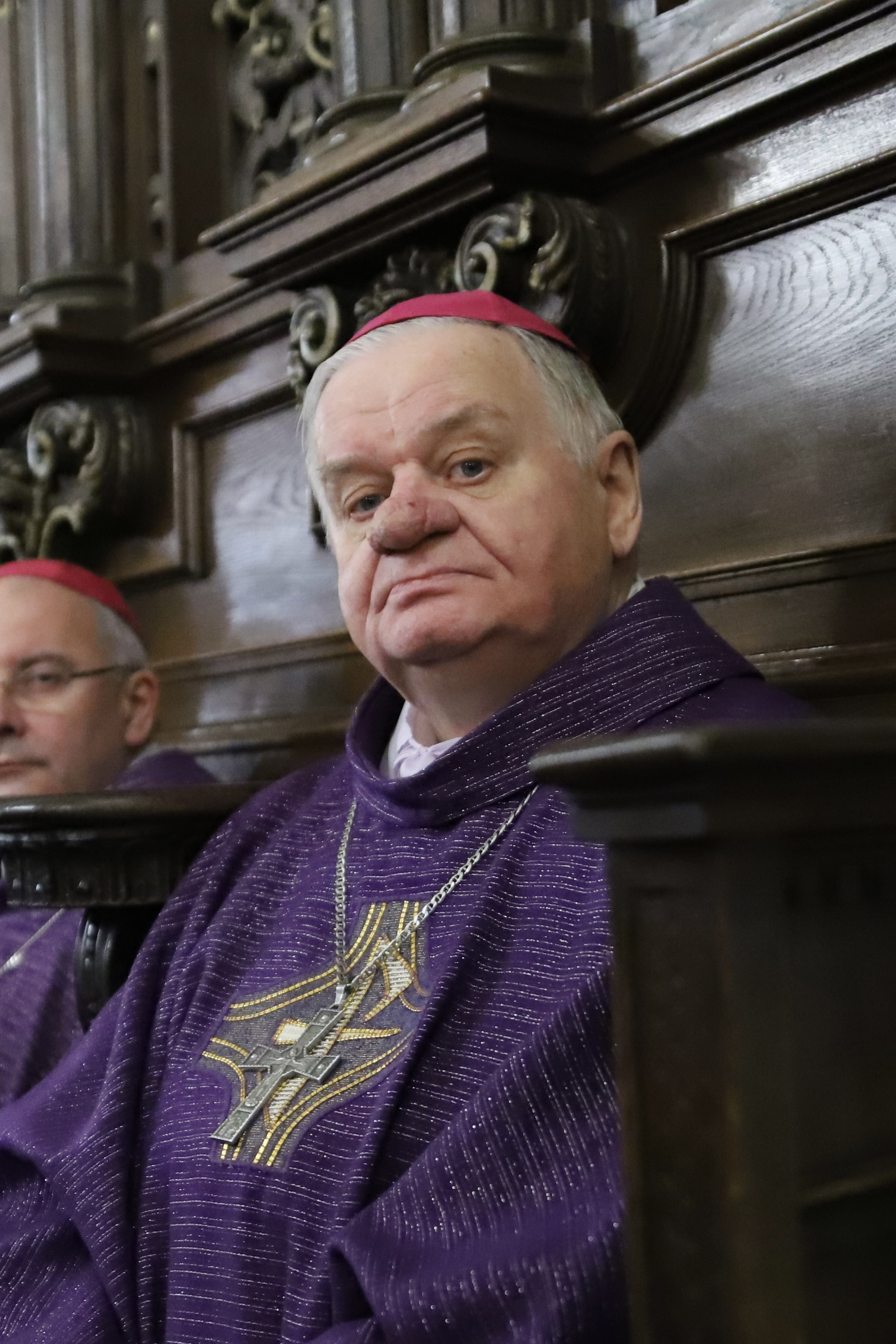
- Tadeusz Rakoczy in 2019
- Church: Latin Church
- Appointed: March 25, 1992; 34 years ago
- Retired: November 16, 2013; 12 years ago
- Successor: Roman Pindel

Orders
- Ordination: April 26, 1992; 34 years ago by Karol Józef Wojtyła
- Consecration: April 26, 1992; 34 years ago by Pope John Paul II

Personal details
- Born: March 30, 1938 (age 88) Gilowice, Kraków Voivodeship, Second Polish Republic

Tadeusz Rakoczy (born 30 March 1938 in Gilowice) is a Polish Roman Catholic bishop.

Ordained to the priesthood on 23 June 1963, Rakoczy was named bishop of the Roman Catholic Diocese of Bielsko–Żywiec, Poland on 25 March 1992 and retired on 16 November 2013.
