= Bielsko Voivodeship =

Former voivodeship of Poland (1975–1998)

Coordinates: 49°49′21″N 19°02′40″E

- Voivodeship of the Polish People's Republic and Third Republic of Poland
- 1975–1998
- The administrative subdivisions of Poland from 1975 to 1998, including the Bielsko Voivodeship.
- Capital: Bielsko-Biała
- Area
  - 1997: 3,704 km^{2} (1,430 sq mi)
- Population
  - 1975: 779,300
  - 1997: 924,000
- Government
  - Type: Voivodeship
- Voivode
  - 1975–1981 (first): Józef Łabudek
  - 1997–1998 (last): Andrzej Sikora
- History
  - Established: 1 June 1975
  - Disestablished: 31 December 1998
- Contained within
  - Country: Polish People's Republic (1975–1989); Third Republic of Poland (1989–1998)
- Political subdivisions: 59 gminas (1997)
Preceded by	Succeeded by
Katowice Voivodeship; Kraków Voivodeship	Lesser Poland Voivodeship; Silesian Voivodeship

The Bielsko Voivodeship (Polish: [ˈbjɛl.skɔ]; Polish: Województwo bielskie) was a voivodeship (province) of the Polish People's Republic from 1975 to 1989, and the Third Republic of Poland from 1989 to 1998. Its capital was Bielsko-Biała. It was established on 1 June 1975, from the parts of the voivodeships of Katowice, and Kraków, and existed until 31 December 1998, when it was partitioned between then-established Lesser Poland, and Silesian Voivodeships.

== History ==
The Bielsko Voivodeship was established on 1 June 1975, as part of the administrative reform, and was one of the voivodeships (provinces) of the Polish People's Republic. It was formed from the part of the territories of the voivodeships of Katowice, and Kraków. Its capital was located in the city of Bielsko-Biała. In 1975, it had a population of 779,300 people.

On 9 December 1989, the Polish People's Republic was replaced by the Third Republic of Poland. In 1997, the voivodeship had a population of 924,000 people, and had an area of 3,704 km². It existed until 31 December 1998, when it was partitioned between then-established Lesser Poland, and Silesian Voivodeships.

== Subdivisions ==
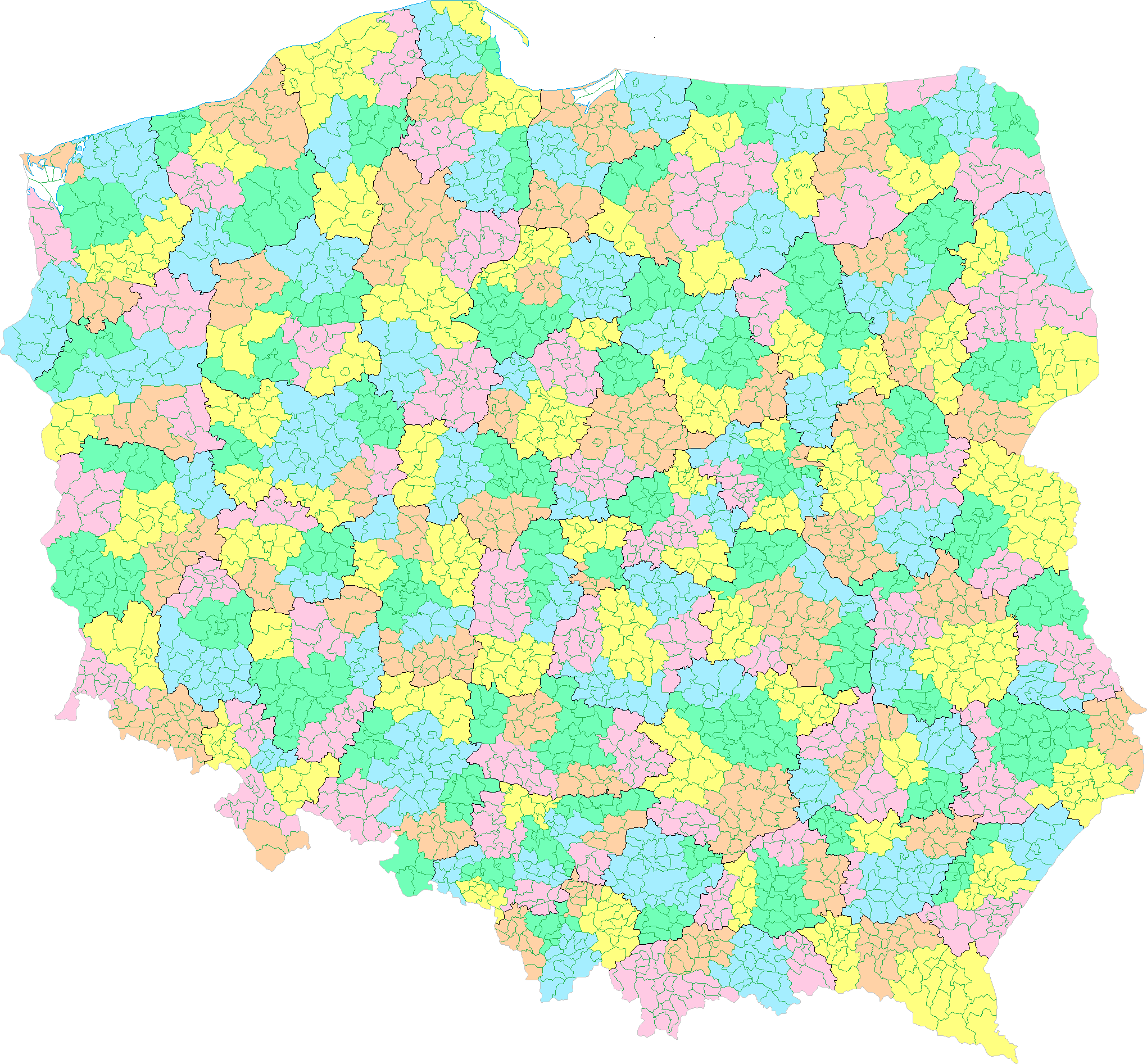
The district offices and gminas (municipalities) of Poland in 1998, including the Bielsko Voivodeship.

In 1997, the voivodeship was divided into 59 gminas (municipalities), including 8 urban municipalities, 10 urban-rural municipalities, and 18 rural municipalities. It had 18 cities and towns.

From 1990 to 1998, it was additionally divided into five district offices, each comprising several municipalities.

== Demographics ==
Year	Population
1975	779,300
1980	829,900
1985	873,600
1990	897,500
1995	916,600
1997	924,000

== Leaders ==
The leader of the administrative division was the voivode. Those were:

- 1 June 1975 – February 1981: Józef Łabudek;
- 10 March 1981 – 7 November 1987: Stanisław Łuczkiewicz;
- 18 December 1987 – 2 April 1990: Franciszek Strzałka;
- 9 April 1990 – 1 February 1994: Mirosław Styczeń;
- 24 February 1994 – 28 November 1997: Marek Trombski;
- 9 December 1997 – 31 December 1998: Andrzej Sikora.
