= Piast tower in Cieszyn =

Coordinates: 49°45′05″N 18°37′34″E

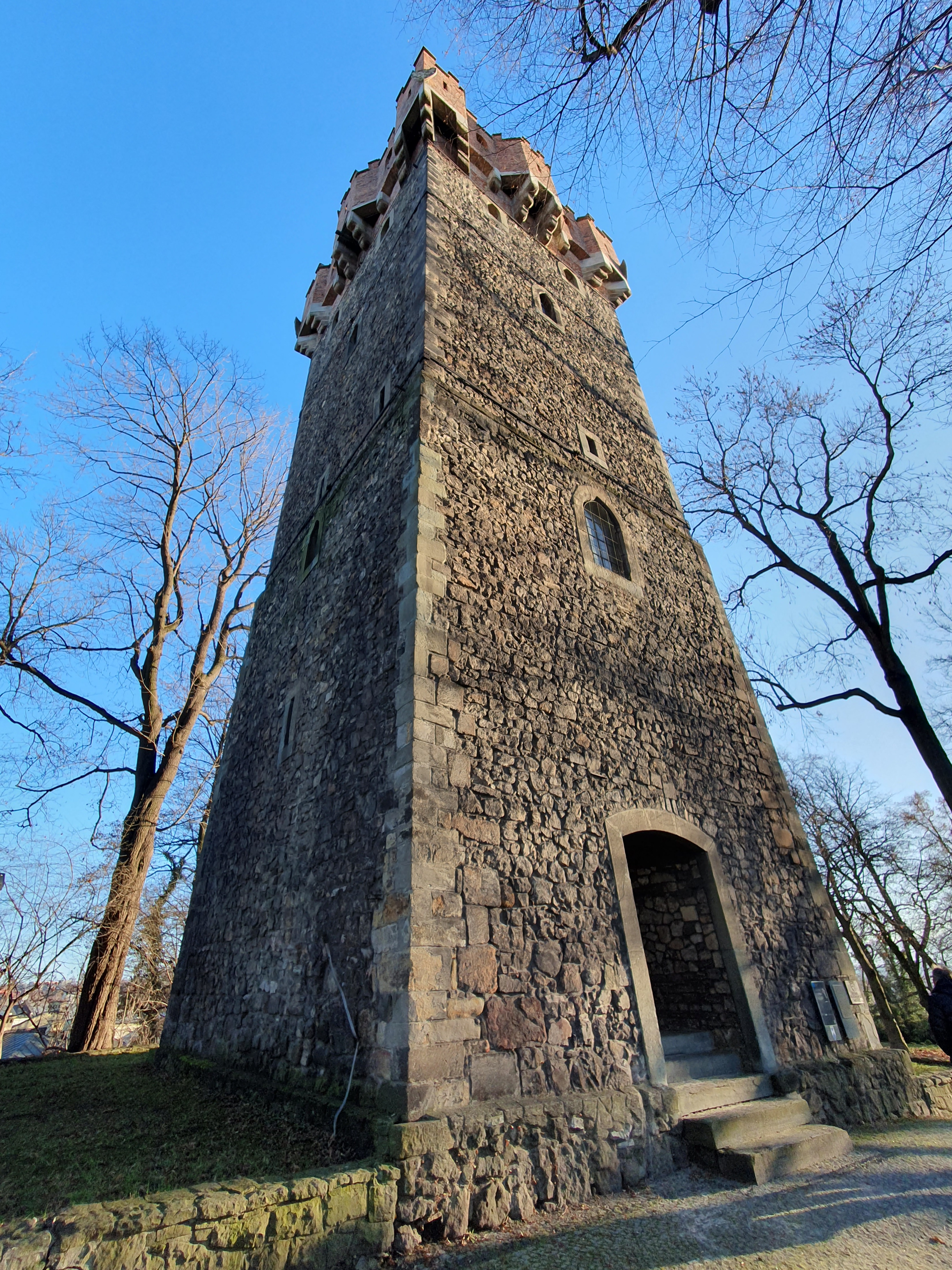

Piast tower in Cieszyn – a defence tower of the former castle of the dukes of Cieszyn on Castle Hill in Cieszyn, Poland one of the four that once existed there and the only one that survived.

The tower is available for visitors (admission tickets). The tower offers a panoramic view of Cieszyn and Czech Cieszyn on the both banks of Olza river. Visibility permitting, one can admire an interesting panorama of Silesian Beskids and Moravian-Silesian Beskids.

== History ==
The Piast Tower was built in the first part of the 14th century and was a part of the upper castle. As one of the four towers it was an important element of the defence system of the castle of Cieszyn in the times of the Piasts. The tower was enlarged in the second half of the fourteenth century and decorated with corner heraldic shields depicting the eagle of the Piasts. At the end of the 15th century another storey was added with machicolation and brick crenellation covered by a high tent roof.

The tower is almost 30 metres high with 120 stairs leading to the top. It is composed of four major parts. The underground part, six metres deep, was a dungeon in the past. The lower part is 9 metres wide and 10 metres high. This part of the tower housed non-residential premises. The middle part was 15 metres high and 8.5 metres wide. This was a residential part. The highest level, 4 metres high, served defensive purposes. In the Middle Ages the top of the tower was covered by a roof under which there was a circular defensive porch. The corners of the upper part were equipped with protrusions in the form of round pinnacles.

The interior of the tower was illuminated by defensive window holes of various shapes and sizes. The castle and the tower as well burned many times. The fires in 1484, 1520, 1552, 1570 and 1603 affected the condition of the tower, although the worst damage was done in the course of the Thirty Years' War. In 1647 Austrian troops besieged the castle, that was in the hands of a Swedish crew. As the result of the fights and cannon firing the roof of the tower and the corner pinnacles with a considerable part of the upper part of the tower were damaged. From that time the condition of the Piast castle gradually deteriorated.

The tower has been renovated many times, inter alia between 1819 and 1840 when the tent roof was replaced by a recessed roof, and on the tower a clock was installed. In the 20th century the tower was renovated in 1976–89, adding, inter alia, an observation deck on the top of it, restoring battlements and the shields with the Piast eagles.

The last renovation took place in 2015 at the upper part of the Piast Tower - in the so-called crenellation. Concrete stairs were renovated, damaged rails were repaired, the platform and the ceiling of the last level were restored.

Throughout the ages the tower has been recognised as a symbol of Cieszyn, a testimony of its Piast past and Poles keeping guard on the Olza river.

== Architecture ==
The Piast Tower is located on the top of the hill, in its north-western part. Gothic, masonry, built in the first half of the 14th century of broken stone and building stones in the corners and frames of the window holes, in the upper part it is built of brick in Polish layout. Built on a square plan, with extensive and cellars partially filled with debris and earth that were supposed to lead to an underground exit beyond the castle walls[8]. Five-storey, 24 meters high. In the lower part the walls are 2 metres thick and from the inside get narrower gradually upwards. Rectangular windows, with Gothic or semi-circular arches. Additional parts built in the 15th century - added brick porch based on solid stone cantilevers, with machicolations and crenellations. As can be seen in an engraving from 1735, initially the tower was covered by a tent roof with separate needles over the corner protrusions of the crenellations. Under the corner protrusions there are four Gothic heraldic shields from the end of the 14th century with the Piast eagles made of a flat relief, according to tradition sculptured by the Prague master Peter Parler.

== Opening hours ==
The Piast Tower is open to the public daily with few exceptions of (Easter, Christmas Day):

- June - August: 9.00 A.M. - 7.00 P.M.
- January, February, November, December : from 9.00 A.M.-4.00 P.M
- March, April, October: Mon-Fri 9.00 A.M.- 5.00 P.M.
- May and September: 9.00 A.M. - 6.00 P.M.

== Trivia ==
Persons awarded by a special identity card issued by Castle Cieszyn are allowed to stay overnight in the Piast Tower free of charge.

There is a website available on the Internet showing the panorama of Cieszyn recorded from the Piast Tower.

In the vicinity of the Piast Tower there is the longest in Europe (65 metres) underground ice tunnel dug in the rock under the Castle Hill. The entrance to the tunnel was located in the Brackie Castle Brewery (the Piast Tower is a distinctive element of the label of Brackie beer) and was used for storing beer.

The Piast Tower is depicted next to Saint Nicolas Rotunda on a tourist badge (No. 173).
