= Kraków Voivodeship (1975–1998) =

Former voivodeship of Poland from 1946 to 1975

- Voivodeship of the Polish People's Republic and Republic of Poland
- 1975–1998
- The Kraków Voivodeship within Poland in 1975.
- Capital: Kraków
- Area
  - 1998: 3,254 km^{2} (1,256 sq mi)
- Population
  - 1998: 1 245 000
- History
  - Established: 1 June 1975
  - Disestablished: 31 December 1998
- Contained within
  - Country: Polish People's Republic (1975–1989); Poland (1989–1998)
Preceded by	Succeeded by
Kraków Voivodeship; Kraków	Lesser Poland Voivodeship

The Kraków Voivodeship, (Note: English pronunciation: /ˈkrækaʊ, ˈkrækoʊ/ KRAK-ow, KRAK-oh, US also /ˈkreɪkaʊ, ˈkrɑːkaʊ/ KRAY-kow, KRAH-kow, UK also /ˈkrækɒf/ KRAK-of; Polish pronunciation: [ˈkrakuf]. Also spelled in English as Cracow, or without Polish diacritics as Krakow.) (Note: Polish: Województwo szczecińskie) from 1975 to 1984 known as the Kraków Metropolitan Voivodeship, (Note: Polish: Województwo miejskie krakowskie) was a voivodeship (province) of the Polish People's Republic from 1975 to 1989, and the Republic of Poland from 1989 to 1998. Its territory included its capital, Kraków and the surrounding municipalities. It was established on 1 June 1975 from the part of the Kraków Voivodeship, and the city of Kraków, which until then acted as a separate administrative division. It existed until 31 December 1998, when it got incorporated into then-established Lesser Poland Voivodeship.
