= Co-Cathedral of the Nativity of the Blessed Virgin Mary, Żywiec =

Coordinates: 49.6881°N 19.2022°E

Co-Cathedral of the Nativity of the Blessed Virgin Mary
- Konkatedra Narodzenia Najświętszej Maryi Panny
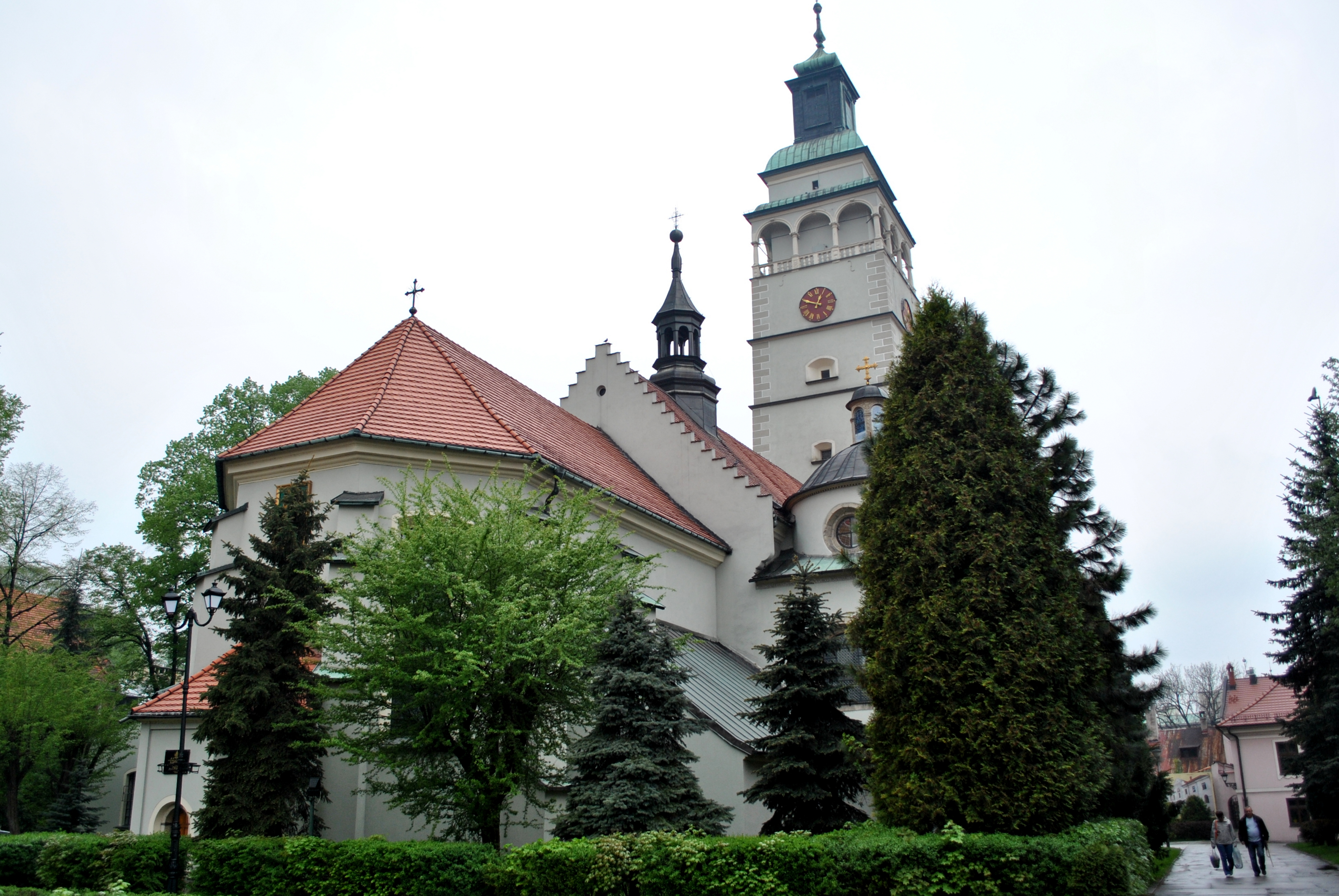
- Co-Cathedral of the Nativity of the Blessed Virgin Mary
- Location: Żywiec
- Country: Poland
- Denomination: Roman Catholic Church

The Co-Cathedral of the Nativity of the Blessed Virgin Mary, (Polish: Konkatedra Narodzenia Najświętszej Maryi Panny), also called Żywiec Cathedral, is the main Catholic religious building in the city of Żywiec, Poland, and the co-cathedral of the Diocese of Bielsko–Żywiec.

In 1470 the church was built in Gothic style and became a parish. In the sixteenth century the church was extended twice with the support of the Komorowski family, once owner of Żywiec. The first expansion took place between 1515 and 1542, with the extension of the chancel and nave. On October 9, 1547, the church was consecrated by the Bishop of Kraków with the title of the "Nativity of the Virgin Mary and St. Lawrence Martyr" in honor of the Extension Promoter church, Lawrence Komorowski. The subsequent expansion was carried out in the years 1582 to 1583 still focused on the ship, with the addition of a square tower, the Italian architect Giovanni Ricci.

The church was elevated to the co-cathedral of the Diocese of Bielsko–Żywiec, simultaneously with the erection of the new diocese on March 25, 1992, with the Bull "Totus Tuus Poloniae populus" of Pope John Paul II.

== See also ==
- Roman Catholicism in Poland
- Co-Cathedral

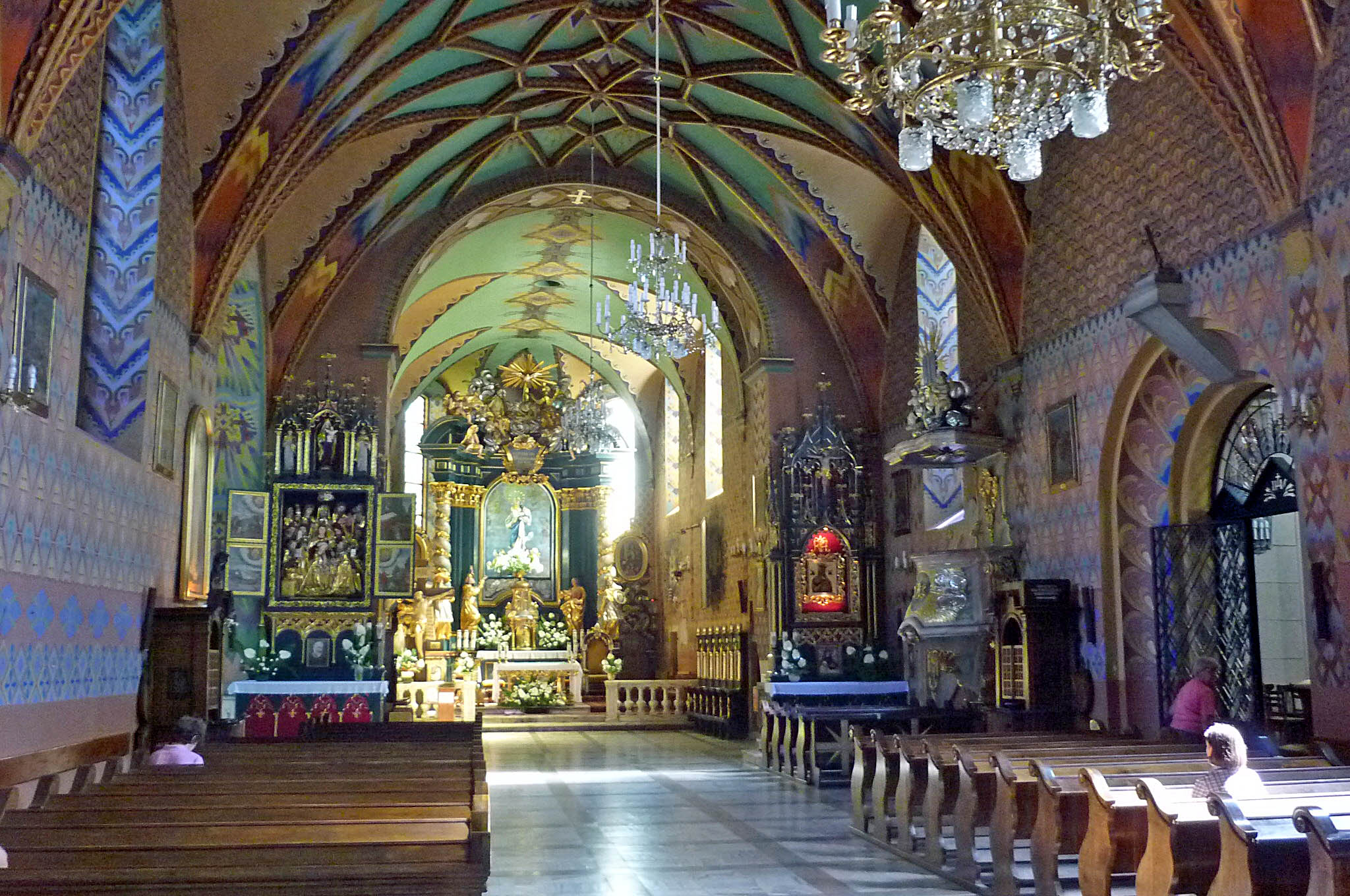
Internal view
