= Cathedral of St. Nicholas, Bielsko-Biała =

Cathedral in Bielsko-Biała

Coordinates: 49°49′12″N 19°2′33.5″E

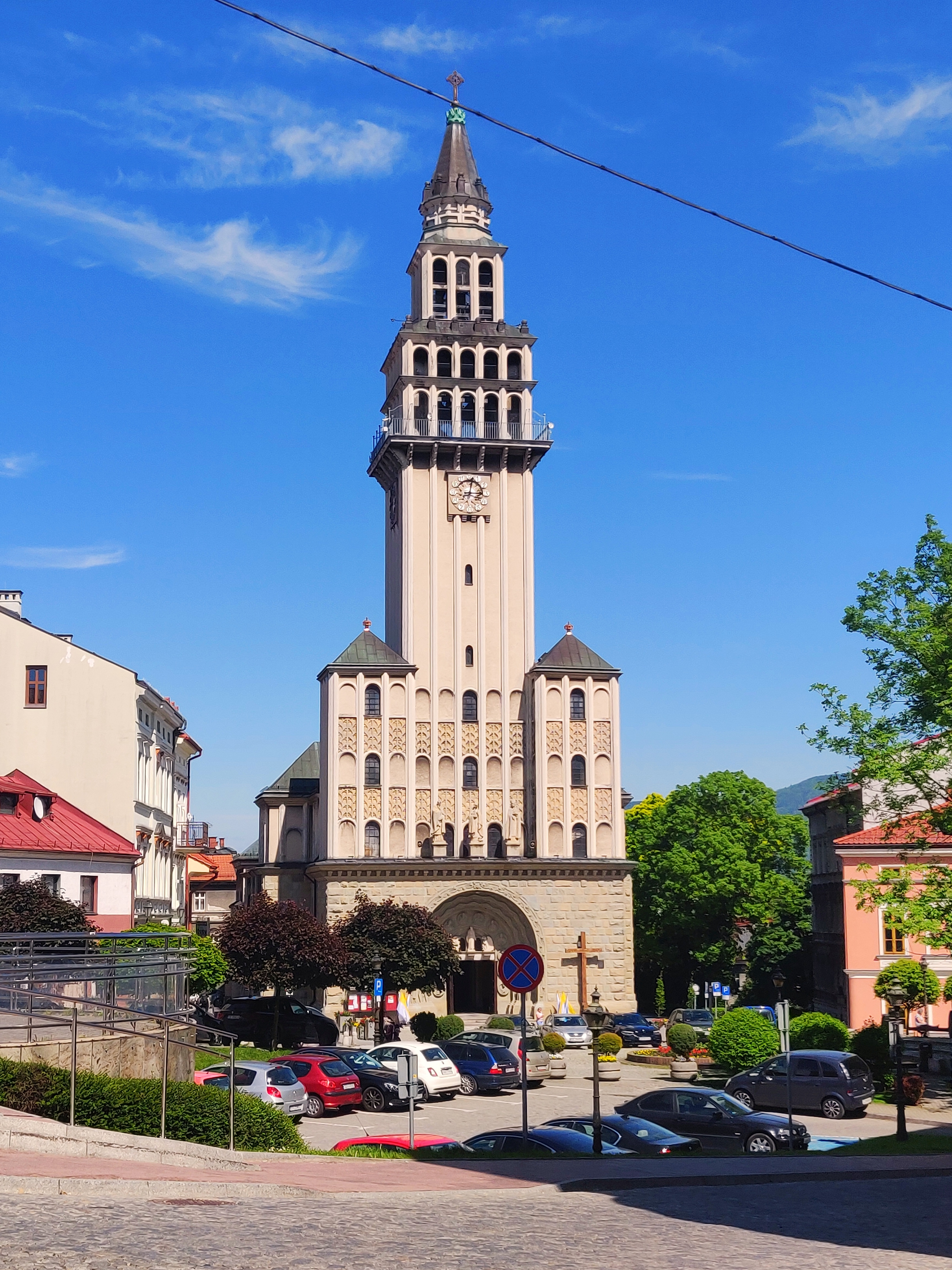
Saint Nicholas' Cathedral

The Saint Nicholas' Cathedral (Kościół katedralny św. Mikołaja) is the main Roman Catholic Church of the city of Bielsko-Biała, in the Silesian Voivodship, Poland.

It overlooks the market square (Rynek). Founded between 1443 and 1447, it was almost completely rebuilt at the beginning of the 20th century according to a design by Viennese architect Leopold Bauer. Another artist from Vienna, Rudolf Harflinger, designed the stained-glass windows. The city was in that time part of the Austro-Hungarian Empire, in the crownland Silesia.

In 1992, the church became the cathedral of the newly created dioceses of Bielsko and Żywiec.

The tower rises 61 meters above the city and is a landmark for the surrounding area.

The organ (III/51) is a work from Rieger-Kloss, built in 1915.
