= Kraków Voivodeship (1945–1975) =

Former voivodeship of Poland from 1945 to 1975

- Voivodeship of the Republic of Poland, and the Polish People's Republic
- 1946–1975
- The Kraków Voivodeship within Poland in 1950.
- Capital: Kraków
- Area
  - 1974: 15,355 km^{2} (5,929 sq mi)
- Population
  - 1946: 2 133 389
  - 1974: 2 213 000
- History
  - Established: 28 June 1946
  - Disestablished: 31 May 1975
- Contained within
  - Country: Republic of Poland (1946–1947); Polish People's Republic (1947–1975)
Preceded by
General Government
Province of Upper Silesia
Succeeded by
Kraków Metropolitan Voivodeship
Nowy Sącz Voivodeship
Tarnów Voivodeship
Bielsko Voivodeship
Katowice Voivodeship
Kielce Voivodeships

The Kraków Voivodeship (Note: English pronunciation: /ˈkrækaʊ, ˈkrækoʊ/ KRAK-ow, KRAK-oh, US also /ˈkreɪkaʊ, ˈkrɑːkaʊ/ KRAY-kow, KRAH-kow, UK also /ˈkrækɒf/ KRAK-of; Polish pronunciation: [ˈkrakuf]. Also spelled in English as Cracow, or without Polish diacritics as Krakow.) (Note: Polish: Województwo krakowskie) was a voivodeship (province) with capital in Kraków, that was located in the southern Lesser Poland. It existed from 1945 to 1975. Until 19 February 1947, it was part of the Republic of Poland, which then was replaced by the Polish People's Republic. It was established on 28 June 1945, from the occupied territories of the Kraków District, General Government, and the Province of Upper Silesia, Germany. In 1957, the city of Kraków separated from the voivodeship, forming a separate administrative division. It ceased to exist on 31 May 1975, when it was partitioned into then-established Kraków Metropolitan, Nowy Sącz, Tarnów, Bielsko, Katowice, and Kielce Voivodeships.

== Subdivisions ==
=== 1945–1973 ===
- Jaworzno (city county) (1956–1973)
- Kraków (city county) (1945–1957)
- Nowy Sącz (city county) (1951–1973)
- Tarnów (city county) (1951–1973)
- Zakopane (city county) (1951–1973)
- Biała County (seat: Biała Krakowska) (1945–1950)
- Bochnia County (seat: Bochnia)
- Brzesko County (seat: Brzesko)
- Chrzanów County (seat: Chrzanów)
- Dąbrowa County (seat: Dąbrowa Tarnowska)
- Dębica County (seat: Dębica) (1945)
- Gorlice County (seat: Gorlice) (1945)
- Jasło County (seat: Jasło) (1945)
- Kraków County (seat: Kraków)
- Limanowa County (seat: Limanowa)
- Miechów County (seat: Miechów)
- Mielec County (seat: Mielec (1945)
- Myślenice County (seat: Myślenice)
- Nowy Sącz County (seat: Nowy Sącz)
- Nowy Targ County (seat: Nowy Targ)
- Olkusz County (seat: Olkusz)
- Oświęcim County (seat: Oświęcim) (1951–1973)
- Tarnów County (seat: Tarnów)
- Wadowice County (seat: Wadowice)
- Żywiec County (seat: Żywiec)

=== 1973–1975 ===
- Jaworzno (city county)
- Nowy Sącz (city county)
- Tarnów (city county)
- Bochnia County (seat: Bochnia)
- Brzesko County (seat: Brzesko)
- Chrzanów County (seat: Chrzanów)
- Kraków County (seat: Kraków)
- Limanowa County (seat: Limanowa)
- Miechów County (seat: Miechów)
- Myślenice County (seat: Myślenice)
- Nowy Sącz County (seat: Nowy Sącz)
- Nowy Targ County (seat: Nowy Targ)
- Olkusz County (seat: Olkusz)
- Oświęcim County (seat: Oświęcim)
- Proszowice County (seat: Proszowice)
- Sucha County (seat: Sucha Beskidzka)
- Tarnów County (seat: Tarnów)
- Wadowice County (seat: Wadowice)
- Żywiec County (seat: Żywiec)

== Gallery ==
The Kraków Voivodeship within Poland in 1946.
