= Baczyn =

Baczyn may refer to the following places:

- Baczyn, Kraków County in Lesser Poland Voivodeship (south Poland)
- Baczyn, Sucha County in Lesser Poland Voivodeship (south Poland)
- Baczyn, West Pomeranian Voivodeship (north-west Poland)
