= Urszula Kenar =

Polish theatrical set designer (born 1947)

- Born: September 15, 1947 (age 77); Zakopane
- Occupation: Set designer
- Children: Zofia Kerneder, Karol Kerneder
- Parent(s): Antoni Kenar, Halina Micińska-Kenarowa
- Relatives: Anna Micińska (half-sister)

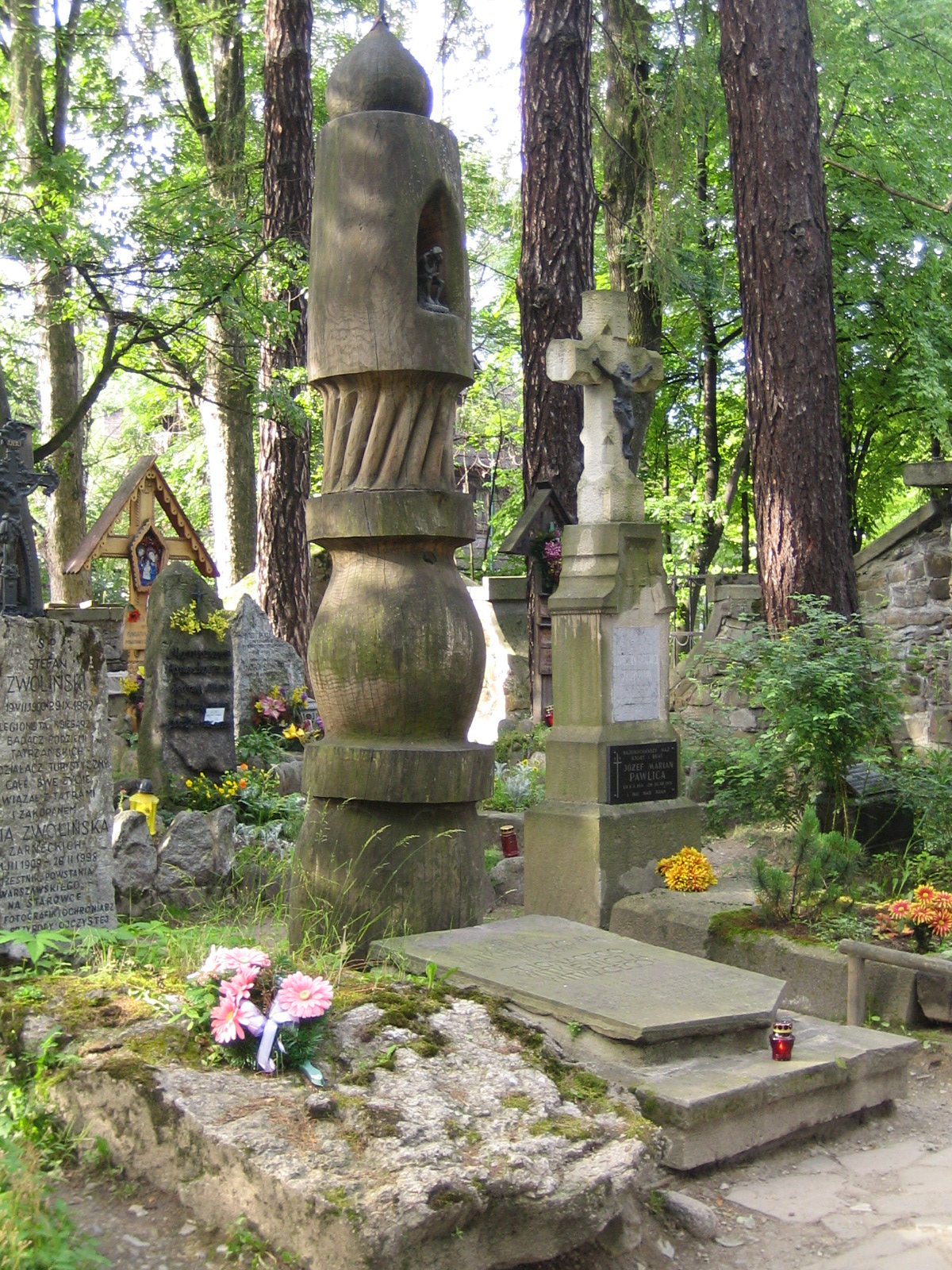
Sculpture on the grave of Maria Witkiewiczowa at the Cemetery of the Meritorious on Pęksowy Brzyzek, created by Urszula Kenar in the workshop of Władysław Hasior

Urszula Kenar (born in 1947 in Zakopane) is a Polish theatrical set designer.

Her father was Antoni Kenar, and her mother was Halina Micińska. Her half-sister was Anna Micińska. She graduated from the Antoni Kenar School of Fine Arts in Zakopane in the sculpture class. Later, she studied set design at the Academy of Fine Arts in Krakow, under the guidance of Andrzej Stopka and Wojciech Krakowski. She defended her diploma in 1973.

She made her debut as a set designer in 1973 at the Gdańsk-based Gdańsk Coastal Theatre, preparing the play Teatr osobny by Miron Białoszewski in collaboration with director Ryszard Major. She then collaborated with Tadeusz Łomnicki New Theatre, New Theatre, Łódź, Wrocław Polish Theatre, and Juliusz Słowacki Theatre. Since 1983, she has been associated with the Helena Modrzejewska National Old Theater. She also designed sets for Teatr Telewizji.

== Set designs at the Helena Modrzejewska National Old Theater ==
- Biedni ludzie by Fyodor Dostoevsky, adaptation and direction by Tadeusz Bradecki, music by Stanisław Radwan, January 22, 1983.
- Z życia glist by Per Olov Enquist, directed by K. Babicki, music by Stanisław Radwan, July 2, 1983.
- Woyzeck by Georg Büchner, directed by T. Bradecki, music by S. Radwan, January 18, 1986.
- Wiosna Narodów w Cichym Zakątku by Adolf Nowaczyński, directed by Tadeusz Bradecki, music by Stanisław Radwan, February 7, 1987.
- Zmiana by Per Olov Enquist, directed by M. Pasieczny, music by Stanisław Radwan, March 10, 1990.
- Godzina kota by Per Olov Enquist, directed by M. Pasieczny, music by Stanisław Radwan, January 8, 1991.
- Fantazy by Juliusz Słowacki, directed by T. Bradecki, music by Stanisław Radwan, February 9, 1991.
- Przerżnąć sprawę by David Mamet, directed by R. Scanlan, music by K. Szwajgier, April 1, 1992.
- Sonata Kreutzerowska by Leo Tolstoy, directed by M. Pasieczny, music by A. Zarycki, March 13, 1993.
- Jak wam się podoba by William Shakespeare, directed by Tadeusz Bradecki, music by Stanisław Radwan, December 12, 1993.
- Cena by A. Miller, directed by B. Wyszomirski, January 14, 1996.
- Gimpel głupek ("Gimpel the Fool and Other Stories") by Isaac Bashevis Singer, directed by K. Orzechowski, musical arrangement by M. Mejza, September 14, 1996.
- Miarka za miarkę by William Shakespeare, directed by Tadeusz Bradecki, music by Stanisław Radwan, June 18, 1998.
- Tomasz Mann by Jerzy Łukosz, directed by K. Orzechowski, musical arrangement by M. Mejza, April 9, 1999.
- Kariera Artura Ui by Bertolt Brecht, directed by T. Bradecki, music by S. Radwan, November 20, 1999.
- Przyjaciele odchodzą. Przesłanie z ostatniego peronu Wszechświata by Zbigniew Herbert, adaptation and direction by T. Malak, music by S. Radwan, December 15, 2001.
- Play Strindberg by F. Dürrenmatta, directed by Tadeusz Bradecki, March 14, 2004.

== Awards ==
- 1974 – 3rd prize for set design for the play Teatr osobny by Miron Białoszewski, directed by Ryszard Major at Teatr Wybrzeże in Gdańsk, at the 15th Festival of Polish Contemporary Art in Wrocław;
- 1980 – award for set design for the play Koczowisko by Tomasz Łubieński, directed by Tadeusz Minc at Teatr Polski in Wrocław, at the 21st Festival of Polish Contemporary Art in Wrocław;
- 1986 – special award for Tadeusz Bradecki, Urszula Kenar, and Stanisław Radwan for creative inspiration of the acting ensemble in the play Woyzeck by Georg Büchner, directed by Bradecki at Stary Teatr in Kraków, at the 26th Kalisz Theater Meetings;
- 1987 – award for set designs for Tadeusz Bradecki's productions - Wiosny Ludów w cichym zakątku by Adolf Nowaczyński at Stary Teatr in Kraków and Pan Jowialski by Aleksander Fredro at Teatr im. Jaracza in Łódź, at the 13th Opole Theater Confrontations "Klasyka Polska";
- 1998 – award for set design for the play Miarka za miarkę by Shakespeare, directed by Tadeusz Bradecki at Stary Teatr in Kraków, at the 2nd Ogólnopolski Festiwal Komedii "Talia" in Tarnów.
