= Tarnawa Dolna =

Tarnawa Dolna may refer to:

- Tarnawa Dolna, Lesser Poland Voivodeship
- Tarnawa Dolna, Podkarpackie Voivodeship
