= Kryspinów =

- Village
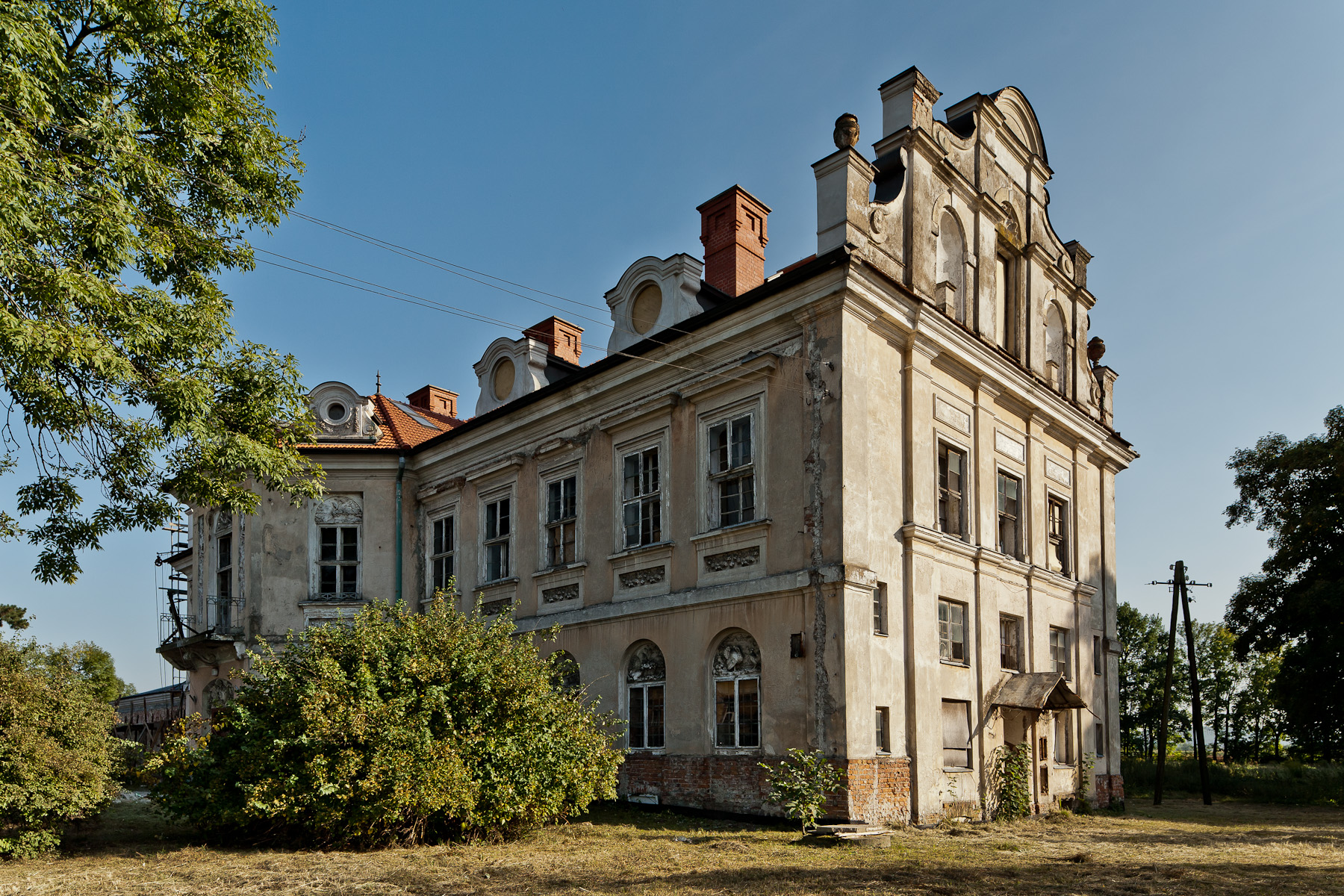
- Palace in Kryspinów

- Location within Poland
- Coordinates: 50°2′N 19°47′E
- Country: Poland
- Voivodeship: Lesser Poland
- County: Kraków
- Gmina: Liszki
- Population: 1,360

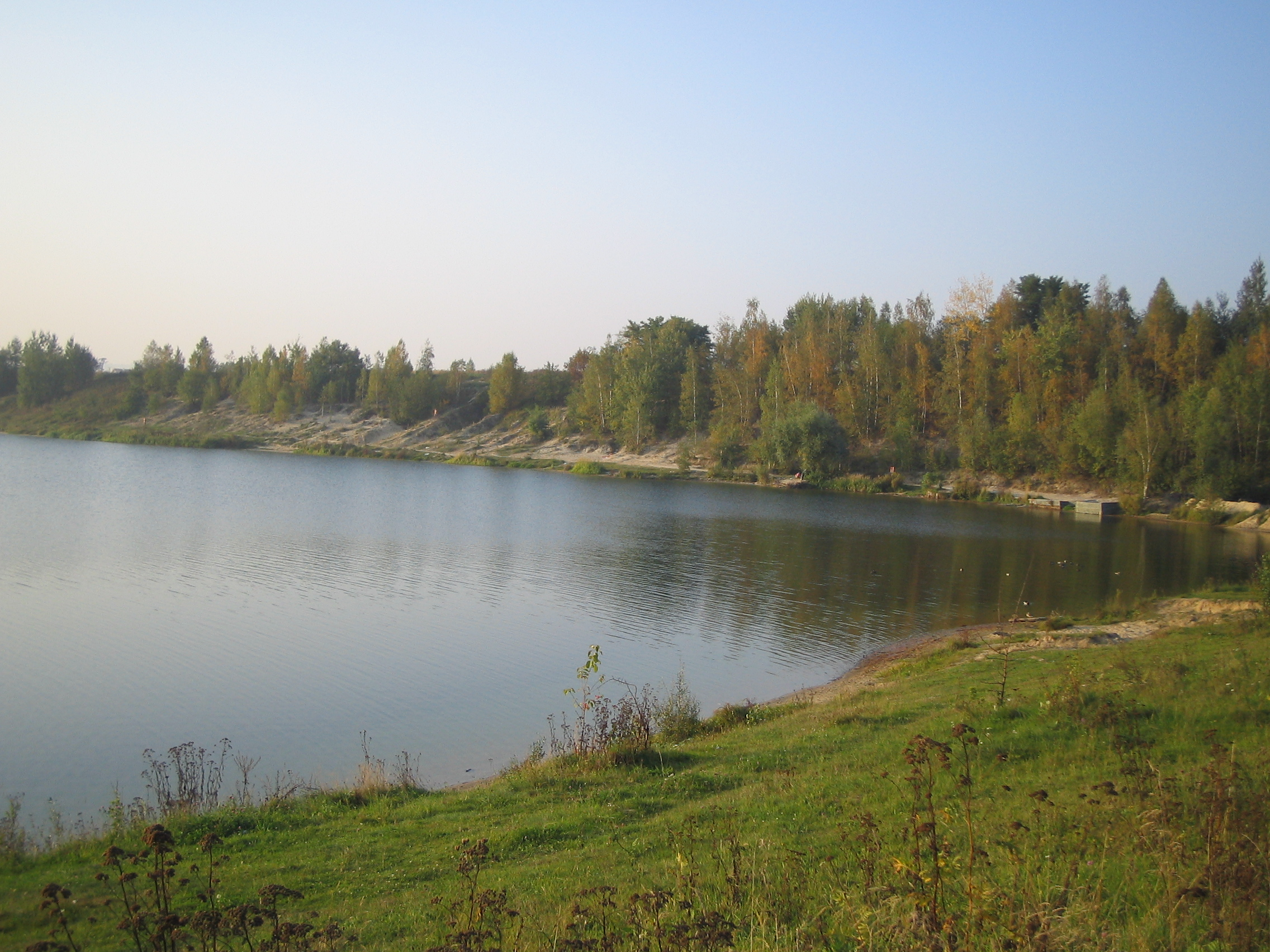
Kryspinów lake

Kryspinów [krɨsˈpinuf] is a village in the administrative district of Gmina Liszki, within Kraków County, Lesser Poland Voivodeship, in southern Poland.

A local Kryspinów Lake is a popular leisure spot among Cracovians. There are two large bodies of water formed on the site of a sand mine; though these actually lie in the neighbouring village of Budzyń.
