= Benedictine Abbey of Tyniec =

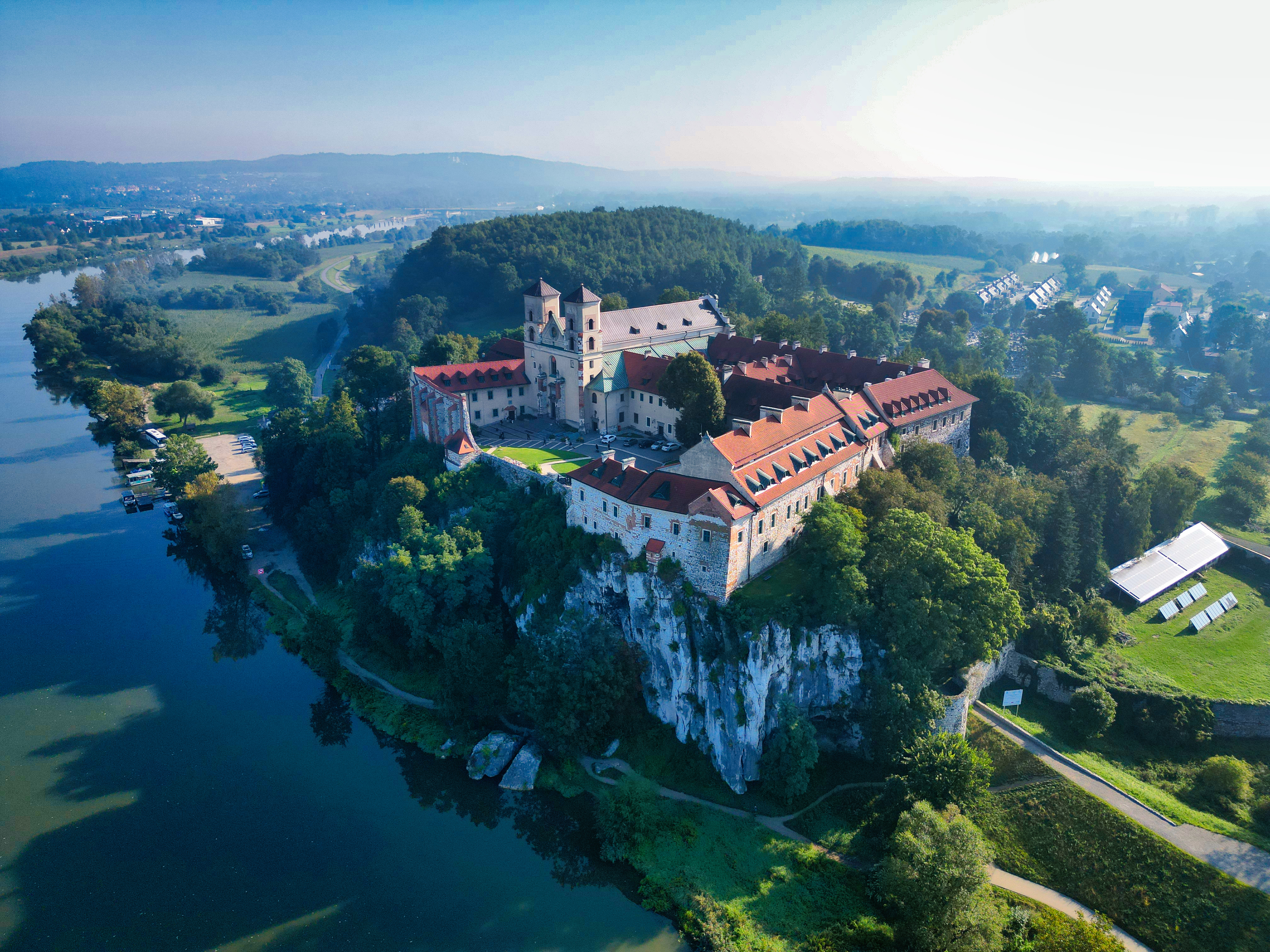
Benedictine abbey

The Benedictine Abbey of Tyniec (Polish: Opactwo Benedyktynów) is a Benedictine monastery in Tyniec, Kraków, Poland.

== History ==
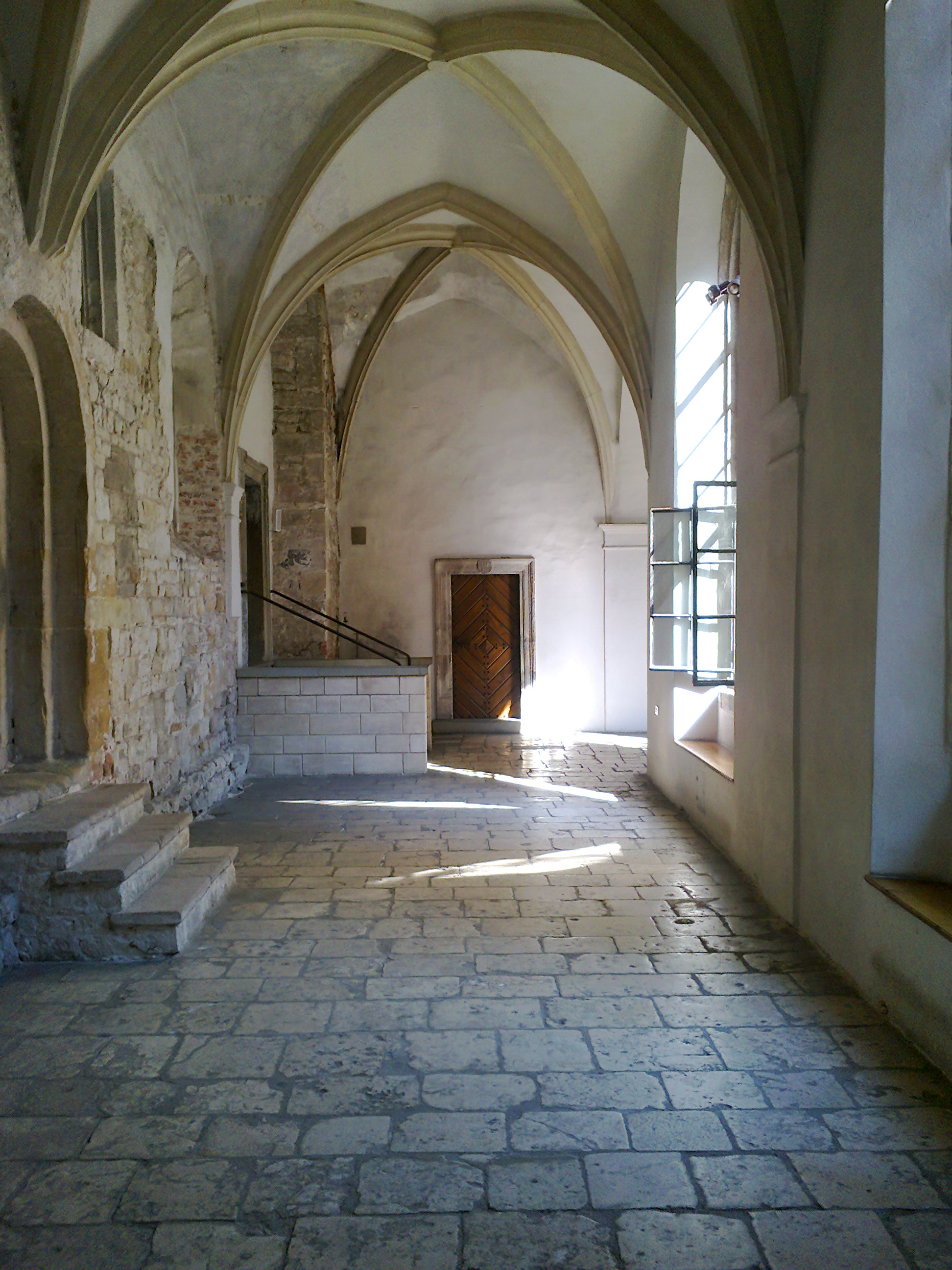
Benedictine abbey cloisters

It is not known when exactly the Benedictine abbey was founded. Duke Casimir the Restorer is speculated to have re-established the Abbey in 1040, during his rebuilding of the newly established Kingdom of Poland, after a Pagan rebellion and a disastrous raid of Duke Bretislaus I (1039).

The Benedictines, invited to Tyniec by Casimir the Restorer, were tasked with restoring order as well as cementing the position of the State and the Church. The first Tyniec Abbot was Aaron, who became the Bishop of Kraków. Since there is no conclusive evidence to support the foundation date as of 1040, some historians claim that the current abbey was founded by Duke Casimir's son, King Boleslaw II the Generous.

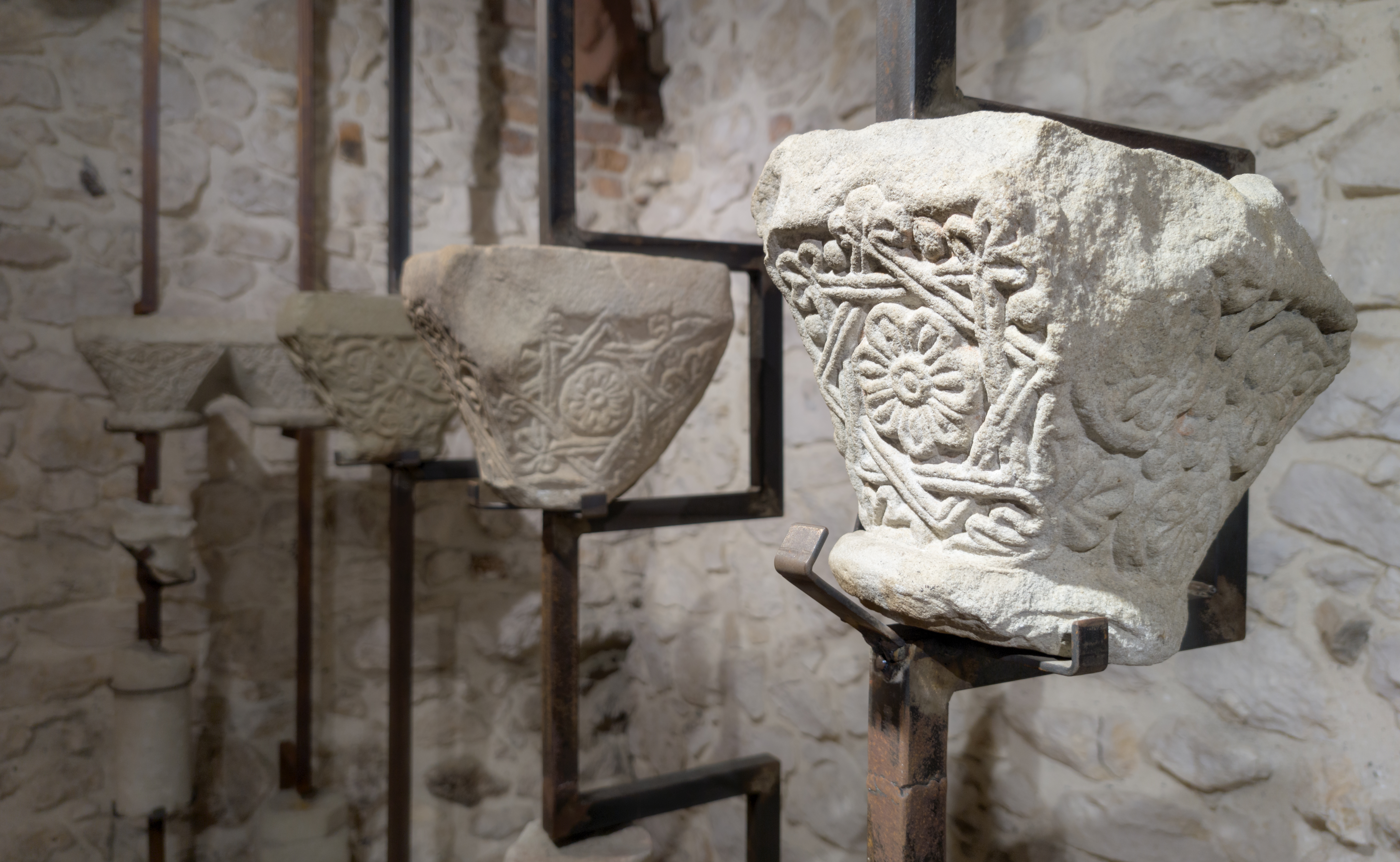
Elements of Romanesque columns from a previous church which existed at the site of the anney.

In the second half of the 11th century, a complex of Romanesque buildings was completed, consisting of a basilica and the abbey. In the 14th century, it was destroyed in Tatar and Czech raids, and in the 15th century it was rebuilt in Gothic style. Further reconstruction took place in the 17th and 18th centuries, first in Baroque, then in Rococo style. The abbey was partly destroyed in the Swedish invasion of Poland, and soon after it was rebuilt, with a new library. Further destruction took place during the Bar Confederation, when Polish rebels turned the abbey into their fortress.

In 1816, Austrian authorities liquidated the abbey, and in 1821–1826, it was the seat of the Bishop of Tyniec, Gregorius Thomas Ziegler former monk in Tyniec. The monks, however, did not return to the abbey until 1939, and in 1947, remodelling of the neglected complex was initiated. In 1968, the Church of St. Peter and Paul was once again named the seat of the abbot. The church itself consists of a Gothic presbytery and a Baroque main nave. Several altars were created by an 18th-century Italian sculptor Francesco Placidi. The church also has a late Baroque pulpit by Franciszek Jozef Mangoldt.

For more than a century, the abbey had remained unoccupied. Only in the last days of July 1939, a month before the outbreak of World War II, eleven Belgian monks moved into it.

== Gallery ==
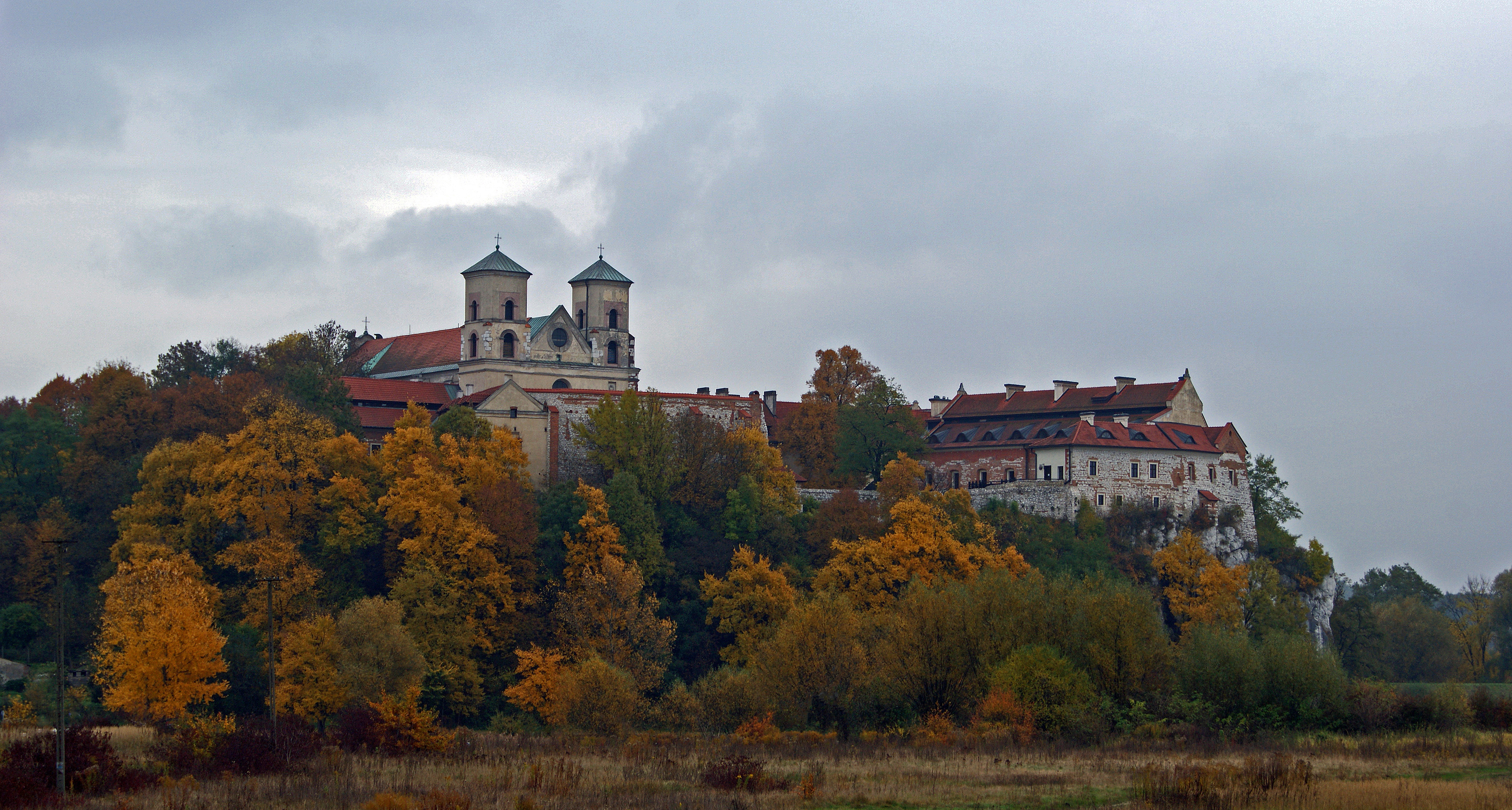
The abbey seen from Piekary

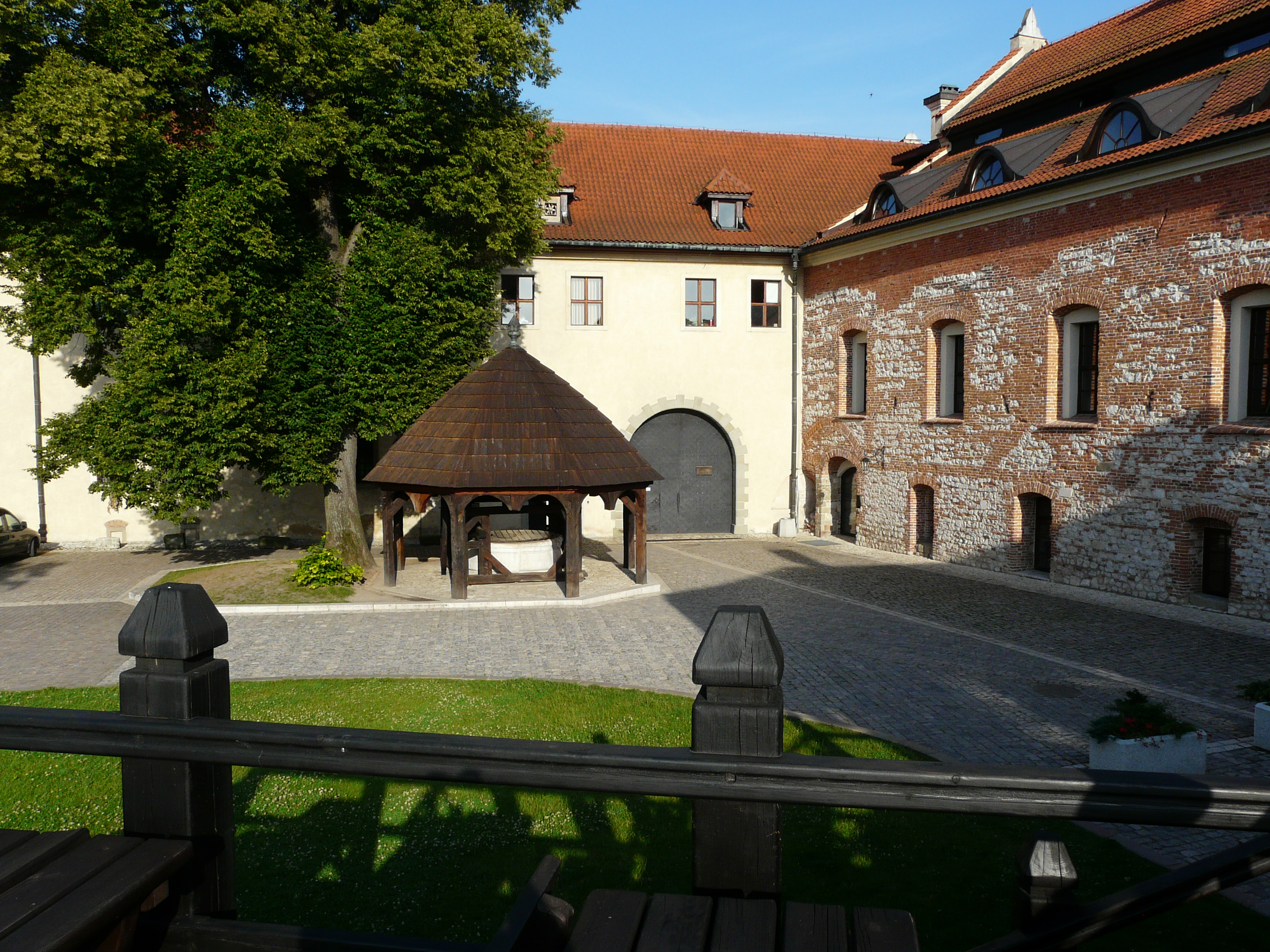
The inner courtyard

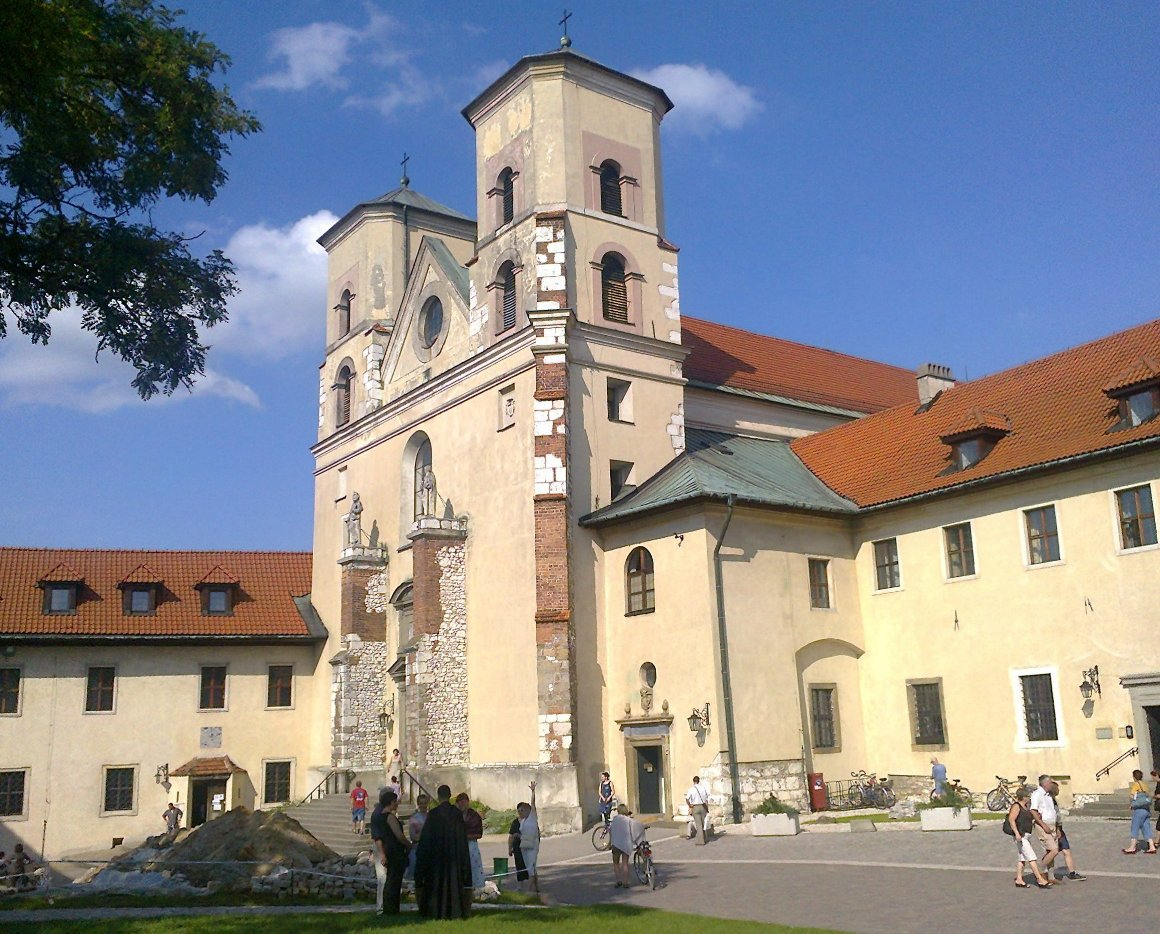
Church of Saints Peter and Paul

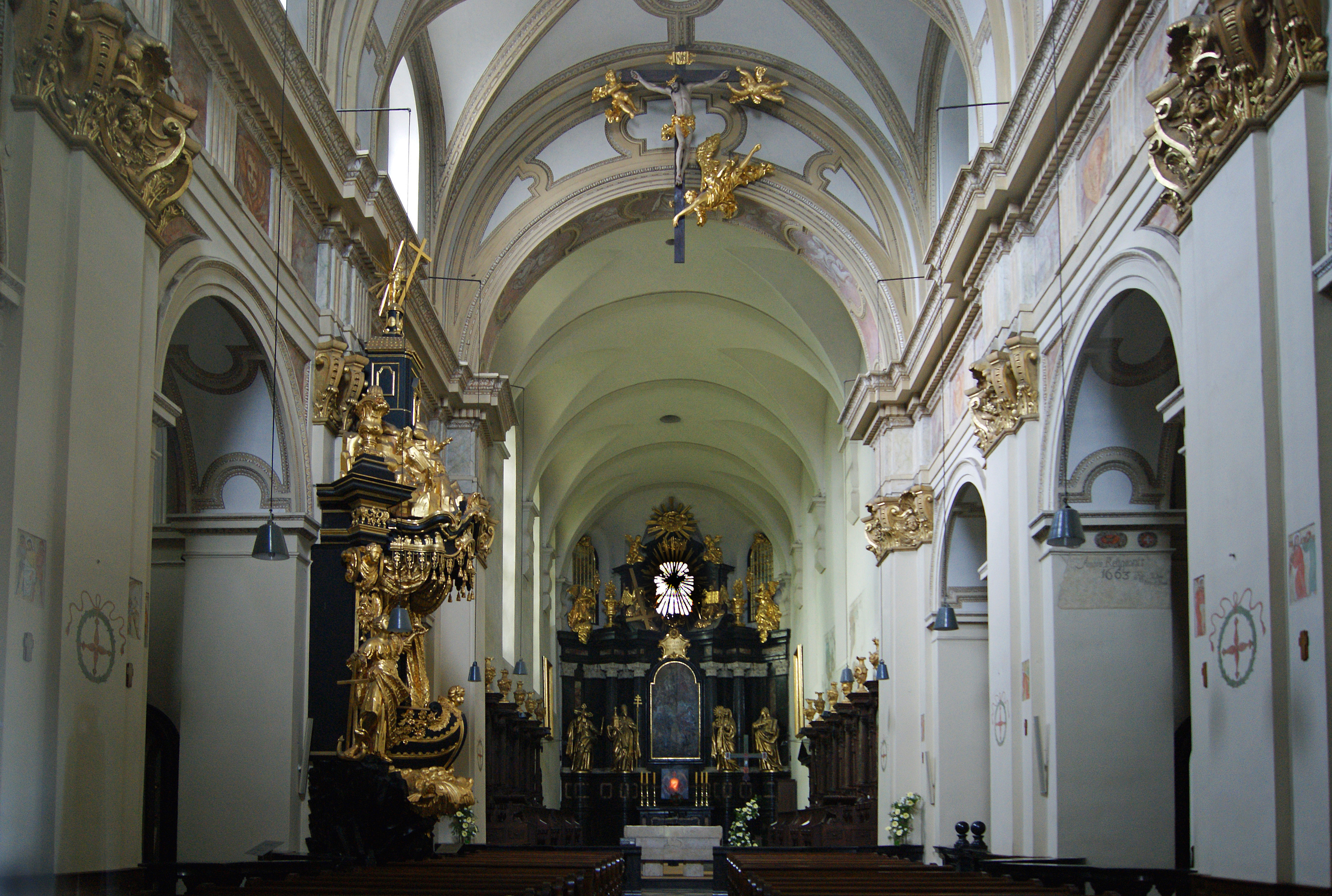
Interior of the church
