= Stanisław Szembek =

Polish Catholic prelate

His Excellency Stanisław Szembek
- Archbishop of Gniezno; Primate of Poland
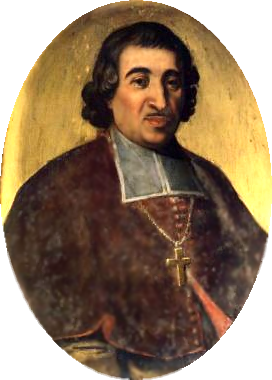
- Church: Roman Catholic
- Archdiocese: Gniezno

Personal details
- Born: 1650 Morawica
- Died: 3 August 1721 (aged 70–71) Skierniewice
- Coat of arms

Stanisław II Szembek (Latin: Stanislaus in Słupów Szembek; 1650 – 3 August 1721) was a Catholic prelate.

== Career ==
Szembek was born in Morawica. In 1678 he became canon of Przemyśl and archdeacon of Zawichost.

He became auxiliary Bishop of Dionysia and Krakow and Bishop and Abbot in Mogiła in 1699.

He became bishop of Kujawy in 1700 and became canon of the Krakow cathedral.

He served as Archbishop of Gniezno and primate of Poland starting in 1706. He died in Skierniewice.
