= Zembrzyce =

- Village
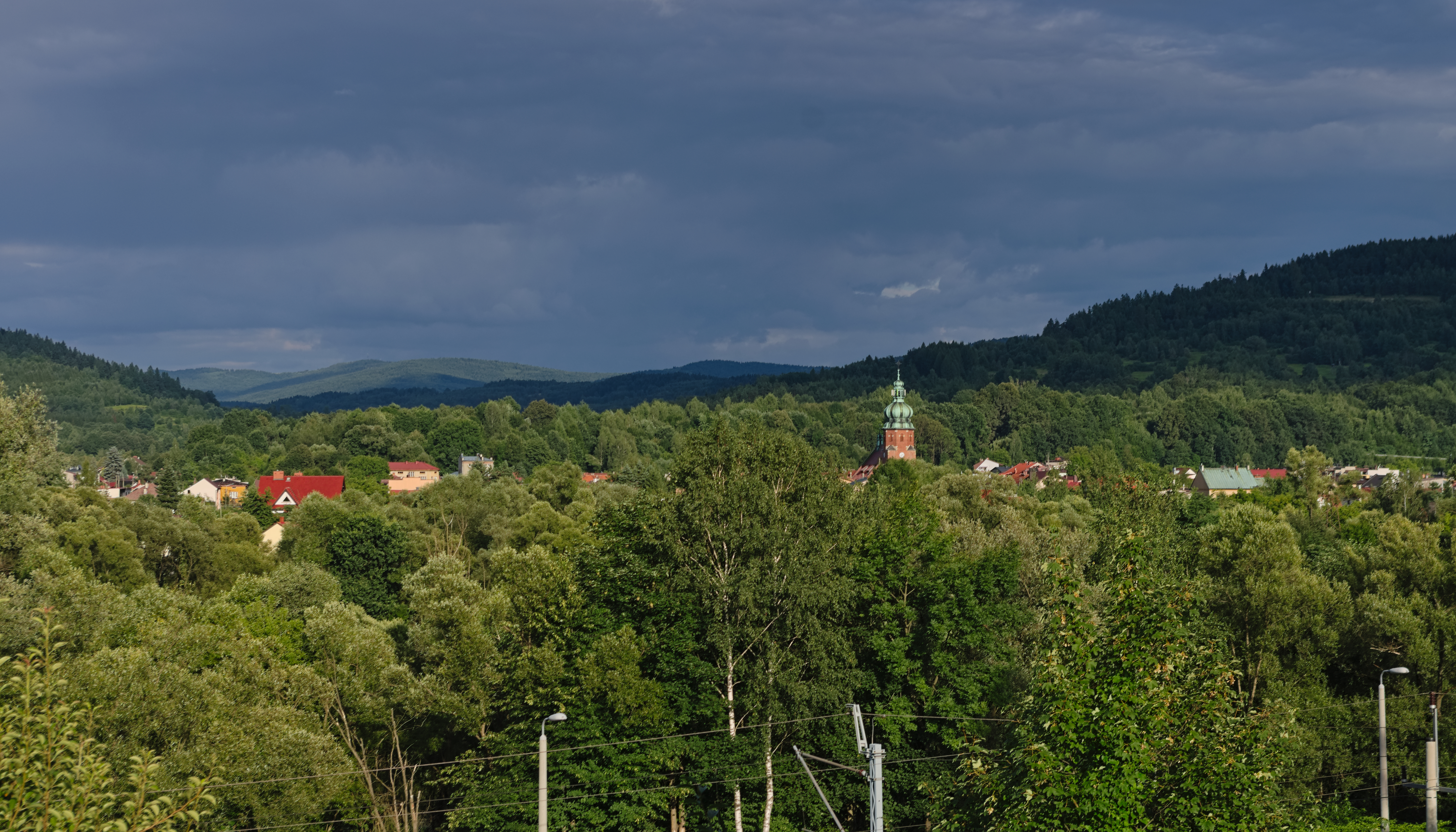
- General view (2023)

- Location within Poland
- Coordinates: 49°47′N 19°36′E
- Country: Poland
- Voivodeship: Lesser Poland
- County: Sucha
- Gmina: Zembrzyce
- Elevation: 320 m (1,050 ft)
- Population: 2,900
- Website: http://www.zembrzyce.pl

Zembrzyce [zɛmˈbʐɨt͡sɛ] is a village in Sucha County, Lesser Poland Voivodeship, in southern Poland. It is the seat of the gmina (administrative district) called Gmina Zembrzyce.

== History ==
Village Zembrzyce is the oldest village of Sucha Beskidzka district. The oldest document confirming its existence as Zubrzic comes from 1333. The village was established earlier – perhaps in the second half of the 13th century. The area of Zembrzyce was a border between Silesia and Lesser Poland in Medieval Times. At the time Zembrzyce belonged to the Duchy of Oświęcim. These were the dukes of Oświęcim that established the village and built a fortified castle on a hill nearby the Skawa river. Nowadays, there aren't any ruins of the castle just the remains of the moat and the place is called Zamczysko. Still, the spot is considered mysterious and fascinating to the locals. Throughout centuries Zembrzyce were private property of nobility. The owners then changed the name of the village as to sound similar to their surname- Zubrzyccy. In the 16th century the final name Zembrzyce was established and it remains until today. Thanks to the owners’ efforts, in 1533 Zembrzyce became a separate parish. From the 16th century there were numerous changes of the village owners.

From the 20th century Zembrzyce became specialized in the tanning industry.

There exists a belief that inhabitants of Zembrzyce have got Tatar ancestry; however this concept is not approved neither by any specific historical documents or facts, nor by ethnical and genetical traits of the inhabitants and the presence of medieval castle in the village in the past.
