= Zachełmna =

- Village
- Location within Poland
- Coordinates: 49°47′54″N 19°41′18″E
- Country: Poland
- Voivodeship: Lesser Poland
- County: Sucha
- Gmina: Budzów
- Elevation: 603 m (1,978 ft)
- Population (approx.): 530

Zachełmna [zaˈxɛu̯mna] is a village in the administrative district of Gmina Budzów, within Sucha County, Lesser Poland Voivodeship, in southern Poland.

The village has an approximate population of 530.
