= Tarnawa Dolna, Lesser Poland Voivodeship =

Tarnawa Dolna
- Village
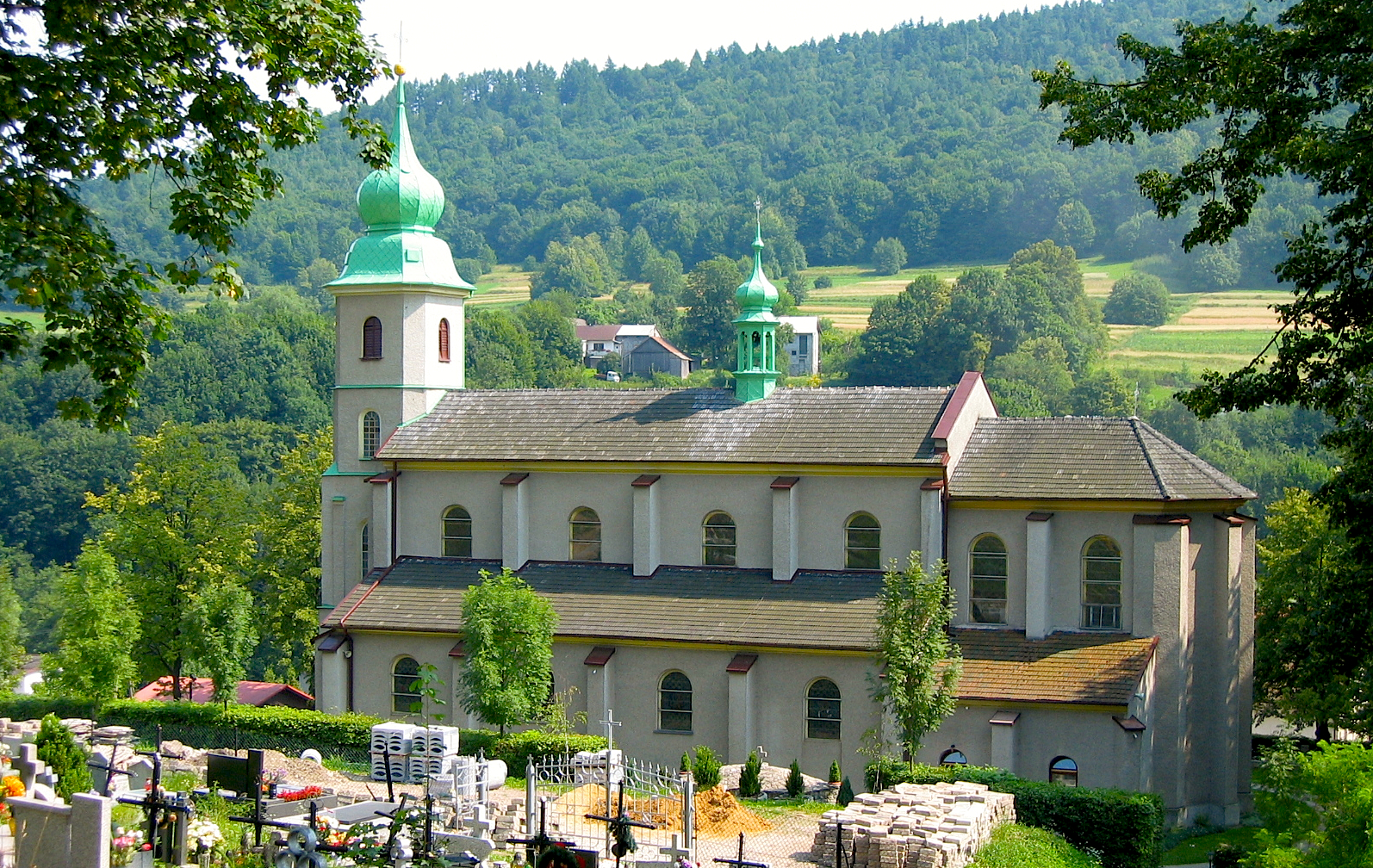
- Parish church in Tarnawa Dolna

- Location within Poland
- Coordinates: 49°47′N 19°34′E
- Country: Poland
- Voivodeship: Lesser Poland
- County: Sucha
- Gmina: Zembrzyce
- Population: 1,500
- Website: http://www.daniowski.jatsu.pl

Tarnawa Dolna [tarˈnava ˈdɔlna] is a village in the administrative district of Gmina Zembrzyce, within Sucha County, Lesser Poland Voivodeship, in southern Poland.

The village of Tarnawa established in the 14th century and according to tradition its first inhabitants were Tatar prisoners of war. Its sister settlement, Tarnawa Górna was settled much later, in the 17th century.
