= Kaszów, Lesser Poland Voivodeship =

Kaszów
- Village
- Location within Poland
- Coordinates: 50°2′20″N 19°43′8″E
- Country: Poland
- Voivodeship: Lesser Poland
- County: Kraków
- Gmina: Liszki
- Population: 2,030
- Website: https://www.kaszow.pl

Kaszów [ˈkaʂuf] is a village in the administrative district of Gmina Liszki, within Kraków County, Lesser Poland Voivodeship, in southern Poland.

During the Second World War 27 Polish civilians (including 7 women) were tortured and murdered on July 1, 1943, in Kaszów by troops of German Police and SS. 24 households were burned.
