= Mników, Lesser Poland Voivodeship =

Mników
- Village
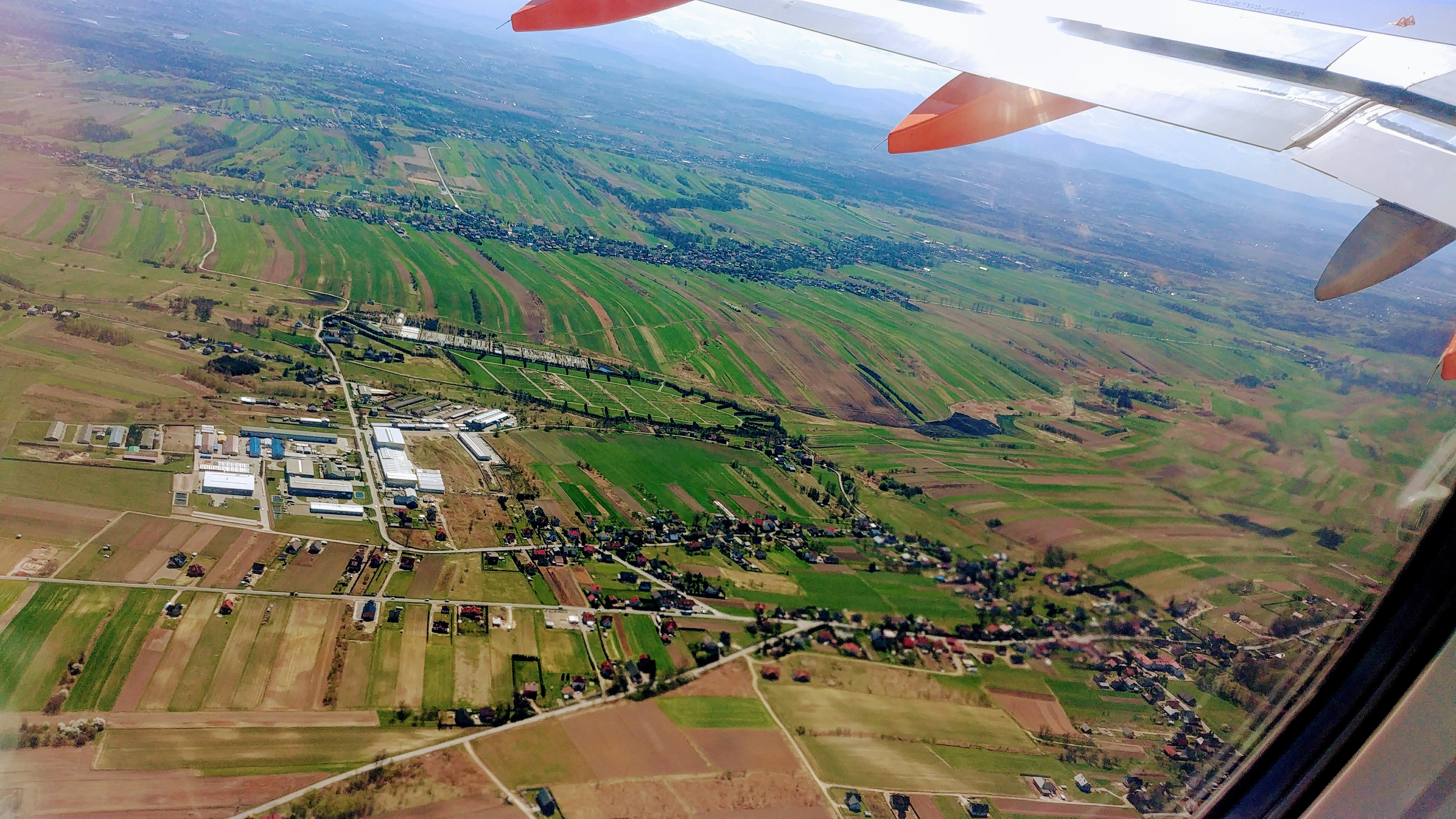

- Location within Poland
- Coordinates: 50°4′N 19°44′E
- Country: Poland
- Voivodeship: Lesser Poland
- County: Kraków
- Gmina: Liszki
- Population: 1,117

Mników [ˈmnikuf] is a village in the administrative district of Gmina Liszki, within Kraków County, Lesser Poland Voivodeship, in southern Poland.
