= Liszki, Lesser Poland Voivodeship =

Liszki
- Village
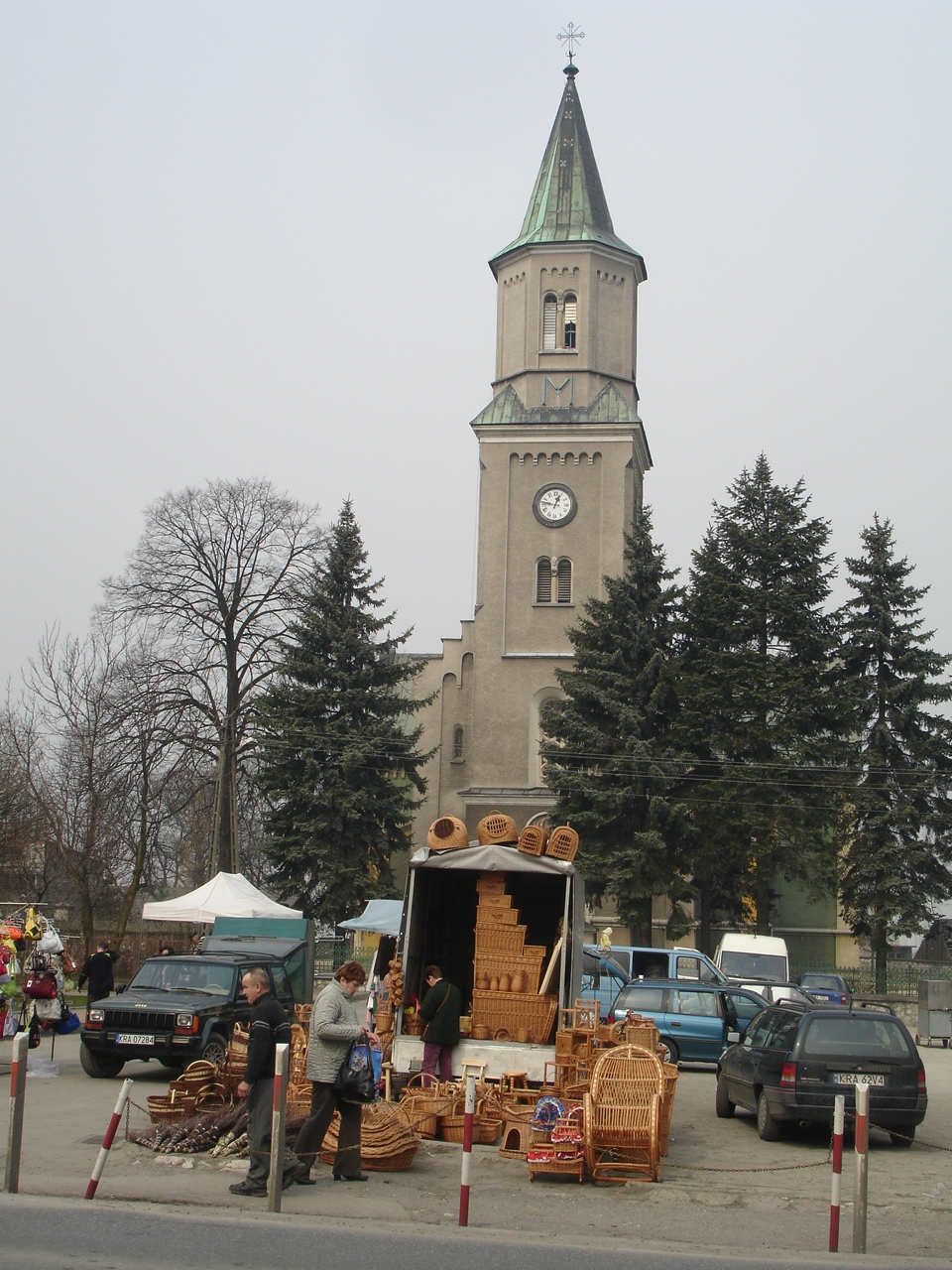
- Saint Nicholas church

- Location within Poland
- Coordinates: 50°2′N 19°46′E
- Country: Poland
- Voivodeship: Lesser Poland
- County: Kraków
- Gmina: Liszki
- Highest elevation: 246 m (807 ft)
- Lowest elevation: 212 m (696 ft)
- Population: 1,850
- Website: https://www.liszki.pl/

Liszki [ˈliʂki] is a village in Kraków County, Lesser Poland Voivodeship, in southern Poland. It is the seat of the gmina (administrative district) called Gmina Liszki.

During the Second World War 30 Polish civilians (including 3 women) were tortured and murdered on July 4, 1943, in Liszki by a troop of German SS.
