= Palcza =

- Village
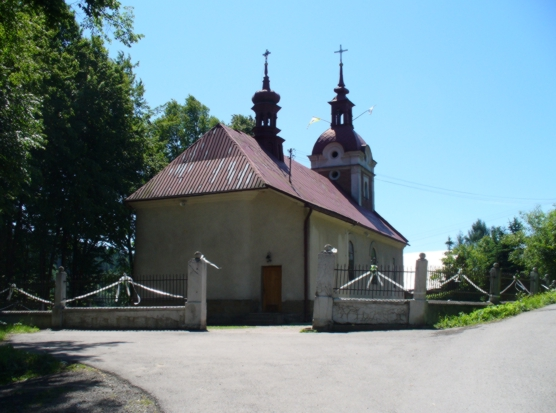
- Church in Palcza

- Location within Poland
- Coordinates: 49°48′45″N 19°44′33″E
- Country: Poland
- Voivodeship: Lesser Poland
- County: Sucha
- Gmina: Budzów
- Population: 1,100

Palcza [ˈpalt͡ʂa] is a village in the administrative district of Gmina Budzów, within Sucha County, Lesser Poland Voivodeship, in southern Poland.

It was established probably before 1369 and was first mentioned in 1373 as a parish. It belonged to starostwo of Lanckorona ever since.
