= Czułów, Lesser Poland Voivodeship =

Czułów
- Village
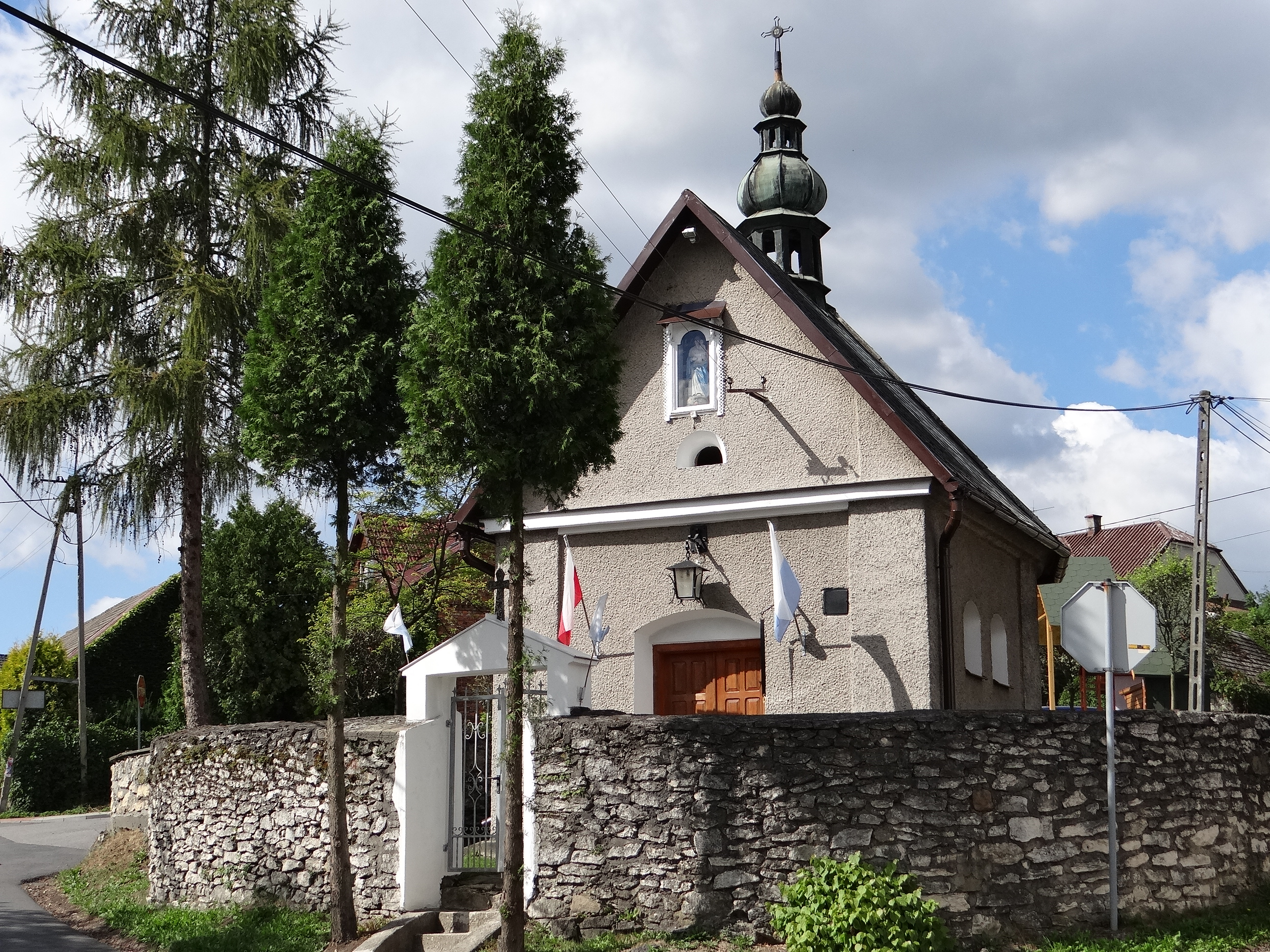
- Saint Mary chapel

- Location within Poland
- Coordinates: 50°3′N 19°42′E
- Country: Poland
- Voivodeship: Lesser Poland
- County: Kraków
- Gmina: Liszki
- Population: 1,119

Czułów [ˈt͡ʂuwuf] is a village in the administrative district of Gmina Liszki, within Kraków County, Lesser Poland Voivodeship, in southern Poland.
