= Antoni Kenar =

Polish sculptor (1906–1959)

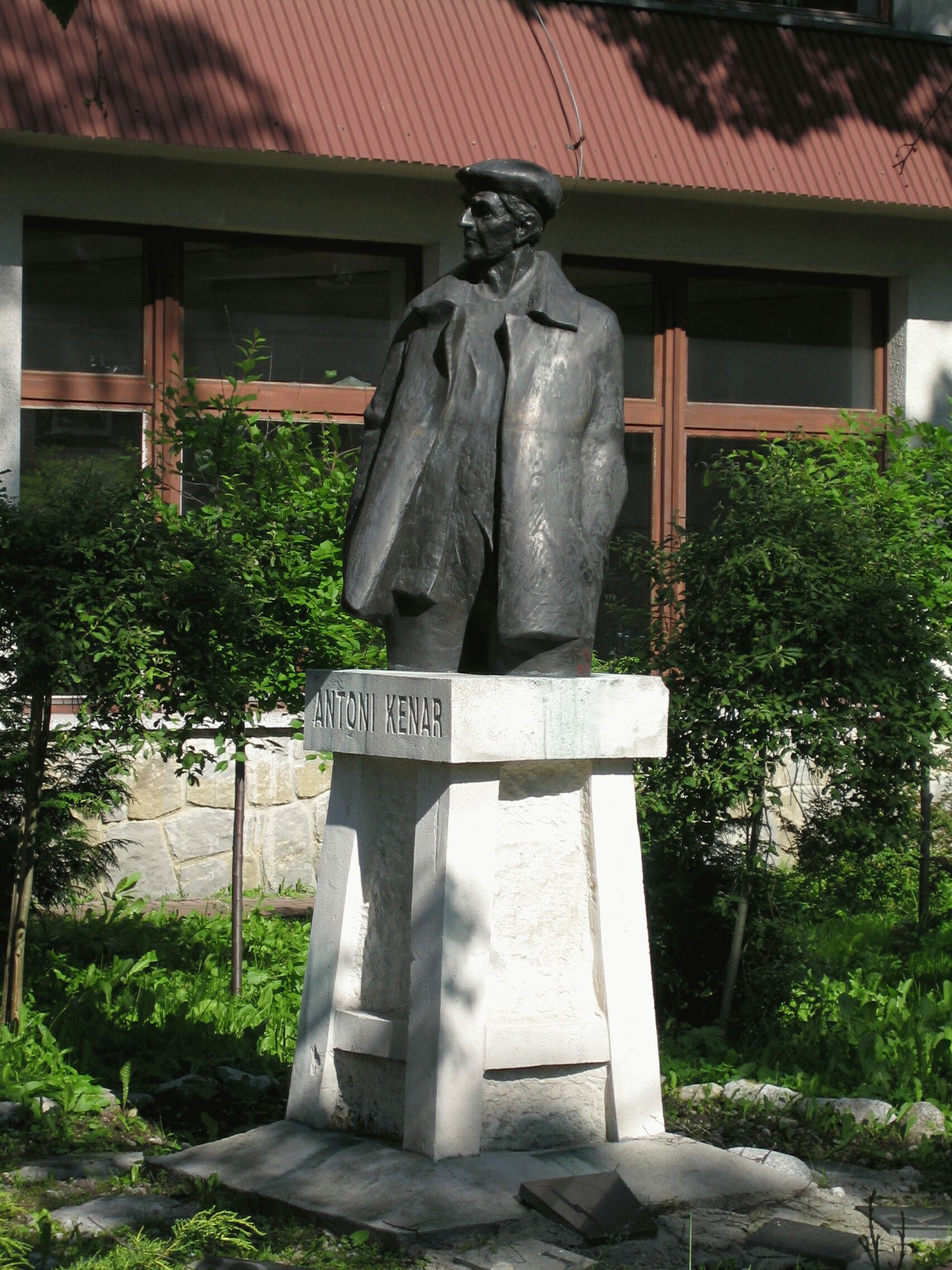
- Born: 23 October 1906; Iwonicz, Poland
- Died: 19 February 1959 (aged 52); Zakopane, Poland
- Style: Sculptor
- Spouse: Halina Micińska-Kenarowa
- Children: Urszula Kenar, Anna Micińska
- Parents: Szymon Kenar (father); Franciszka Kenar (Jarocińska) (mother)

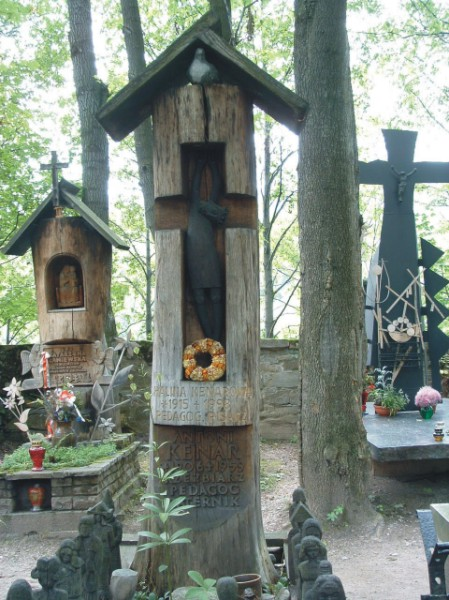
Grave of Antoni Kenar at the Pęksowy Brzyzek National Cemetery in Zakopane

Antoni Kenar (born 23 October 1906, in Iwonicz, died 19 February 1959, in Zakopane) was a Polish sculptor, educator, and director of the Antoni Kenar School of Fine Arts in Zakopane. He was also a mountaineer.

== Biography ==
He was born on 23 October 1906, in Iwonicz, to the family of Szymon and Franciszka née Jarocińska. He completed primary school in Iwonicz. In 1925, he graduated from the State School of Wood Industry in Zakopane, specializing as an ornamental sculptor. His teacher and mentor were Karol Stryjeński. He completed his studies at the sculpture department of the Academy of Fine Arts in Warsaw. In 1938, he returned to Zakopane. During the occupation, he stayed in Warsaw. In the autumn of 1941 and the spring of 1942, he lived in the village of Balice, in the Świętokrzyskie Voivodeship, where he created wooden sculptures for the local church altar and a stone statue of Jesus Christ made from Pińczów stone, standing in front of the church. After the Warsaw Uprising, he was deported by the Germans to forced labor camps in Oberhausen and Essen. In 1947, he returned to Zakopane and took up a position at the State School of Wood Industry. From 1954, he became the director of the school, which, after reorganization in 1948, was named the State High School of Fine Arts. A few months after Kenar's death, the school was officially named after him.

His work was part of the art competitions at the 1932 Summer Olympics and the 1948 Summer Olympics.

== Antoni Kenar School of Fine Arts in Zakopane ==
Kenar's merit lay in the profound education system reform in School of Fine Arts in Zakopane, combining creative freedom, respect for folk art tradition, proficient craftsmanship, and an understanding of contemporary art trends. Many artists graduated from the "Kenar School," including sculptors such as Władysław Hasior, Stanisław Kulon, Antoni Rząsa, and Bronisław "Buni" Tusk.

== Important works of art ==
In his own artistic creations, Kenar blended elements of the Podhale region with influences from Cubism and Art Deco. Some of his preserved works include: "Aniołek" (1937), "Narciarka" (Skier)(1948), "Dyskobolka" (1956), "Niedźwiedź" (1955), "Madonna" (1941), the design for the Auschwitz Victims Monument (1952), as well as sculptures on the ships MS Batory and MS Piłsudski. Additionally, the artist's work includes the cross on the grave of Karol Stryjeński (1933).

== Orders and decorations ==
- Knight's Cross of the Order of Polonia Restituta (1958)
- Golden Cross of Merit (22 July 1952)
- Medal of the 10th Anniversary of People's Poland (28 February 1955)

== Commemoration ==
- Since 1959, the State High School of Fine Arts in Zakopane has been named after Antoni Kenar.
- Streets in the Krakow district of Dzielnica X Swoszowice and in Iwonicz-Zdroj have been named in his honor.
- Antoni Kenar rests at the Pęksowy Brzyzek National Cemetery in Zakopane (plot L-II-9).
