= Gmina Liszki =

Gmina Liszki Liszki Commune
- Gmina
- Flag Coat of arms
- Interactive map of Gmina Liszki
- Coordinates (Liszki): 50°2′19″N 19°46′6″E
- Country: Poland
- Voivodeship: Lesser Poland
- County: Kraków County
- Seat: Liszki

Area
  - Total: 72.03 km^{2} (27.81 sq mi)

Population (2006)
  - Total: 15,636
  - Density: 217.1/km^{2} (562.2/sq mi)
- Website: http://www.liszki.gmina.pl/

Gmina Liszki is a rural gmina (administrative district) in Kraków County, Lesser Poland Voivodeship, in southern Poland. Its seat is the village of Liszki, which lies approximately 13 kilometres (8 mi) west of the regional capital Kraków.

The gmina covers an area of 72.03 square kilometres (27.8 sq mi), and as of 2006 its total population is 15,636.

The gmina contains part of the protected area called Bielany-Tyniec Landscape Park.

== Villages ==
Gmina Liszki contains the villages and settlements of Baczyn, Budzyń, Cholerzyn, Chrosna, Czułów, Jeziorzany, Kaszów, Kryspinów, Liszki, Mników, Morawica, Piekary, Rączna and Ściejowice.

== Neighbouring gminas ==
Gmina Liszki is bordered by the city of Kraków and by the gminas of Czernichów, Krzeszowice, Skawina and Zabierzów.
