= Śleszowice =

- Village
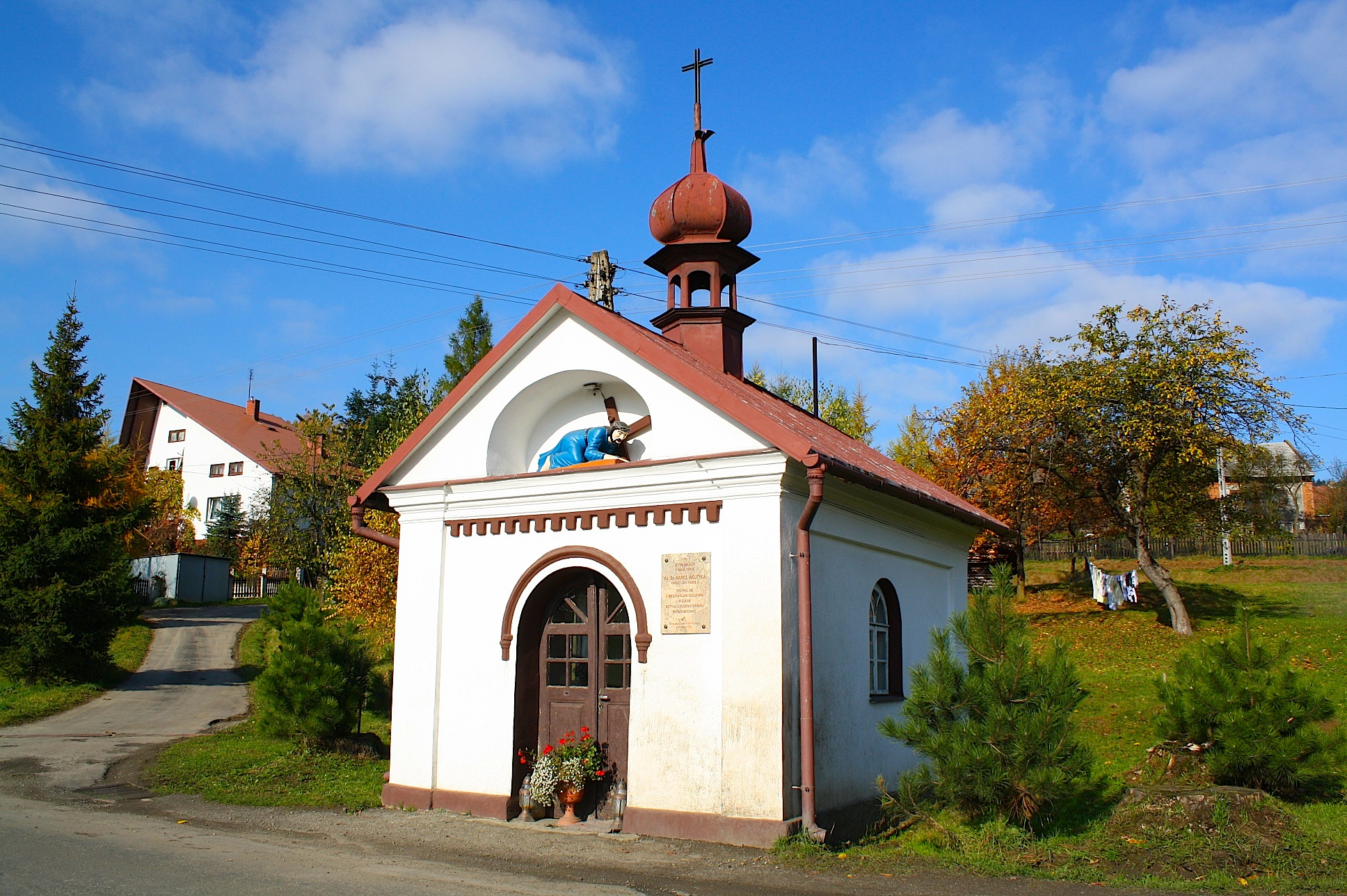
- A wayside shrine in Śleszowice

- Location within Poland
- Coordinates: 49°47′N 19°31′E
- Country: Poland
- Voivodeship: Lesser Poland
- County: Sucha
- Gmina: Zembrzyce
- First mentioned: 1376

Śleszowice [ɕlɛʂɔˈvit͡sɛ] is a village in the administrative district of Gmina Zembrzyce, within Sucha County, Lesser Poland Voivodeship, in southern Poland.

The village was first mentioned in 1376.
