= Stanisław Radwan =

Polish composer (1939–2023)

- Born: 10 March 1939; Bieńkówka, Poland
- Died: 14 October 2023 (aged 84); Kraków, Poland
- Occupation: Composer

Stanisław Radwan (10 March 1939 – 14 October 2023) was a Polish composer.

== Life and career ==
Born in Bieńkówka, the son of an organist, Radwan studied piano and composition at the Academy of Music in Kraków under Krzysztof Penderecki. He later got a scholarship to study in Paris, where he enrolled in courses given by Pierre Schaeffer and Olivier Messiaen. Starting from 1960, he penned over 200 compositions for theatre and cabaret, and served as the musical director at the Ateneum Theatre in Warsaw from 1963 to 1966, and as the theatre director of the Helena Modrzejewska National Old Theater in Krakow from 1980 to 1990. His collaborations include Andrzej Wajda, Konrad Swinarski, Jerzy Jarocki, Krystian Lupa, Zygmunt Hübner, Tadeusz Bradecki. Starting from 1966, he was also active as a film score composer, and notably collaborated with Andrzej Wajda, Krzysztof Kieślowski, Wojciech Has. He occasionally also worked as an actor.

During his career Radwan received numerous awards and honors, notably the Gloria Artis Medal for Merit to Culture in 2005. He died on 14 October 2023, at the age of 84.
