= Ściejowice =

- Village
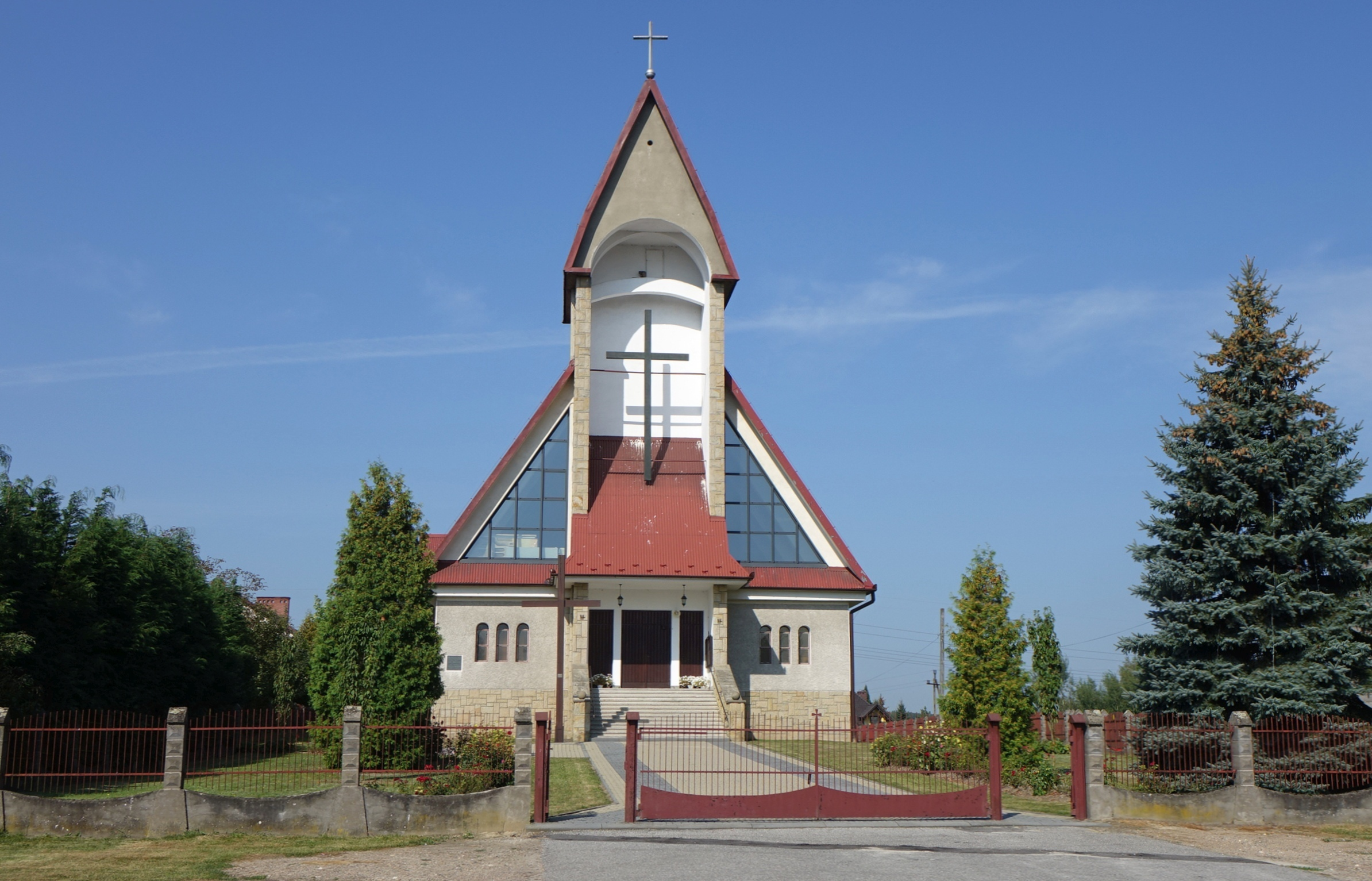
- Catholic church

- Location within Poland
- Coordinates: 50°0′N 19°47′E
- Country: Poland
- Voivodeship: Lesser Poland
- County: Kraków
- Gmina: Liszki
- Highest elevation: 226 m (741 ft)
- Lowest elevation: 206 m (676 ft)
- Population (2011): 875
- Website: http://www.sciejowice.pl

Ściejowice [ɕt͡ɕɛjɔˈvit͡sɛ] is a village in the administrative district of Gmina Liszki, within Kraków County, Lesser Poland Voivodeship, in southern Poland.
