= Bielany and Tyniec Landscape Park =

Protected area in Poland

- Bielańsko-Tyniecki Park Krajobrazowy
- IUCN category V (protected landscape/seascape)
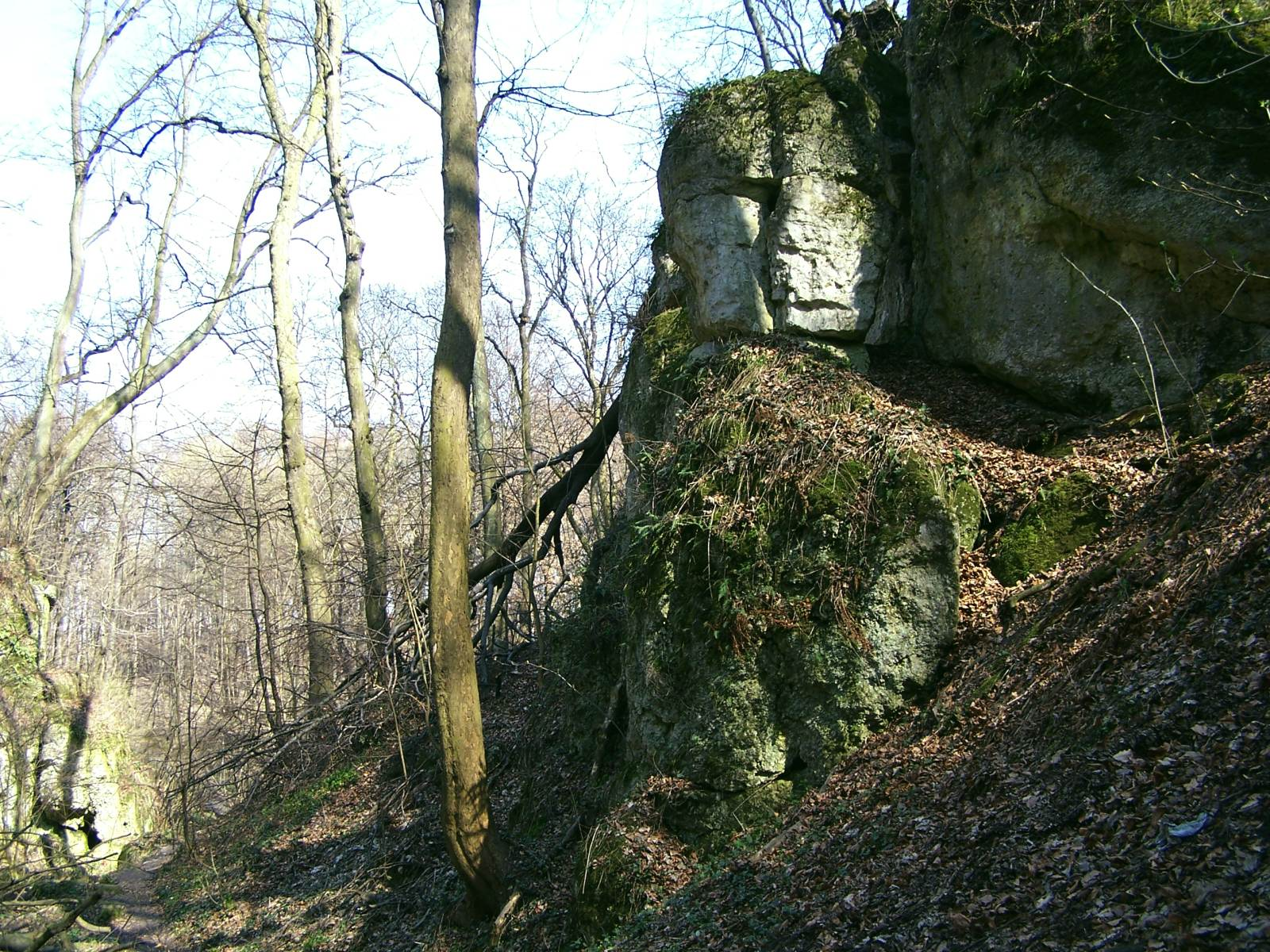
- Panieńskie Skały nature reserve
- Interactive map of Bielany and Tyniec Landscape Park
- Location: Lesser Poland Voivodeship, Poland
- Coordinates: 50.0133°N 19.827°E
- Area: 65.02 km^{2} (25.10 mi^{2})
- Established: 1981

The Bielany and Tyniec Landscape Park (Bielańsko-Tyniecki Park Krajobrazowy) is a protected area (Landscape Park) in southern Poland, established in 1981, covering an area of 65.02 square kilometres (25.10 sq mi).

== Location ==
The Park is in Lesser Poland Voivodeship. Part of it is within the city of Kraków, with the remainder in Kraków County, shared between two gminas (administrative districts): Gmina Czernichów and Gmina Liszki. The Park takes its name from Bielany and Tyniec, two former villages which are now part of Kraków.

Within the Landscape Park are four nature reserves, as well as 18 natural monuments, including trees and caves.
