= Jeziorzany, Lesser Poland Voivodeship =

Jeziorzany
- Village
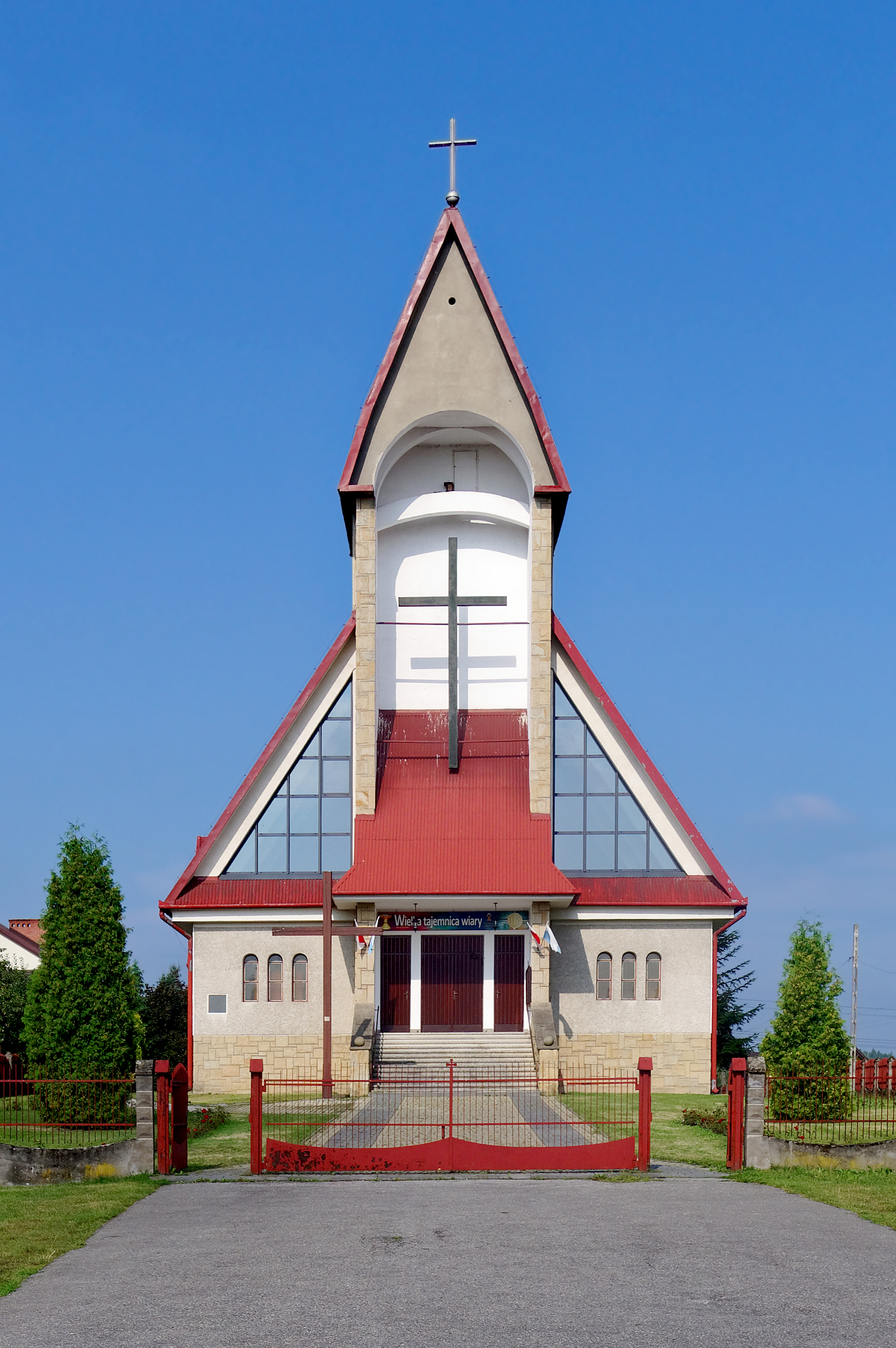
- Catholic church

- Location within Poland
- Coordinates: 49°59′40″N 19°46′33″E
- Country: Poland
- Voivodeship: Lesser Poland
- County: Kraków
- Gmina: Liszki
- Population: 853

Jeziorzany [jɛʑɔˈʐanɨ] is a village in the administrative district of Gmina Liszki, within Kraków County, Lesser Poland Voivodeship, in southern Poland.
