= Gmina Budzów =

Gmina Budzów Budzów Commune
- Gmina
- Flag Coat of arms
- Interactive map of Gmina Budzów
- Coordinates (Budzów): 49°46′40″N 19°40′32″E
- Country: Poland
- Voivodeship: Lesser Poland
- County: Sucha
- Seat: Budzów

Area
  - Total: 73.41 km^{2} (28.34 sq mi)

Population (2006)
  - Total: 8,311
  - Density: 113.2/km^{2} (293.2/sq mi)
- Website: http://www.budzow.pl/

Gmina Budzów is a rural gmina (administrative district) in Sucha County, Lesser Poland Voivodeship, in southern Poland. Its seat is the village of Budzów, which lies approximately 8 kilometres (5 mi) north-east of Sucha Beskidzka and 37 km (23 mi) south-west of the regional capital Kraków.

The gmina covers an area of 73.41 square kilometres (28.3 sq mi), and as of 2006 its total population is 8,311.

== Villages ==
Gmina Budzów contains the villages and settlements of Baczyn, Bieńkówka, Budzów, Jachówka, Palcza and Zachełmna.

== Neighbouring gminas ==
Gmina Budzów is bordered by the gminas of Lanckorona, Maków Podhalański, Pcim, Stryszów, Sułkowice, Tokarnia and Zembrzyce.
