= Cholerzyn =

- Village
- Location within Poland
- Coordinates: 50°4′N 19°46′E
- Country: Poland
- Voivodeship: Lesser Poland
- County: Kraków
- Gmina: Liszki
- Population: 940

Cholerzyn [xɔˈlɛʐɨn] is a village in the administrative district of Gmina Liszki, within Kraków County, Lesser Poland Voivodeship, in southern Poland.
