= Budzów, Lesser Poland Voivodeship =

Budzów
- Village
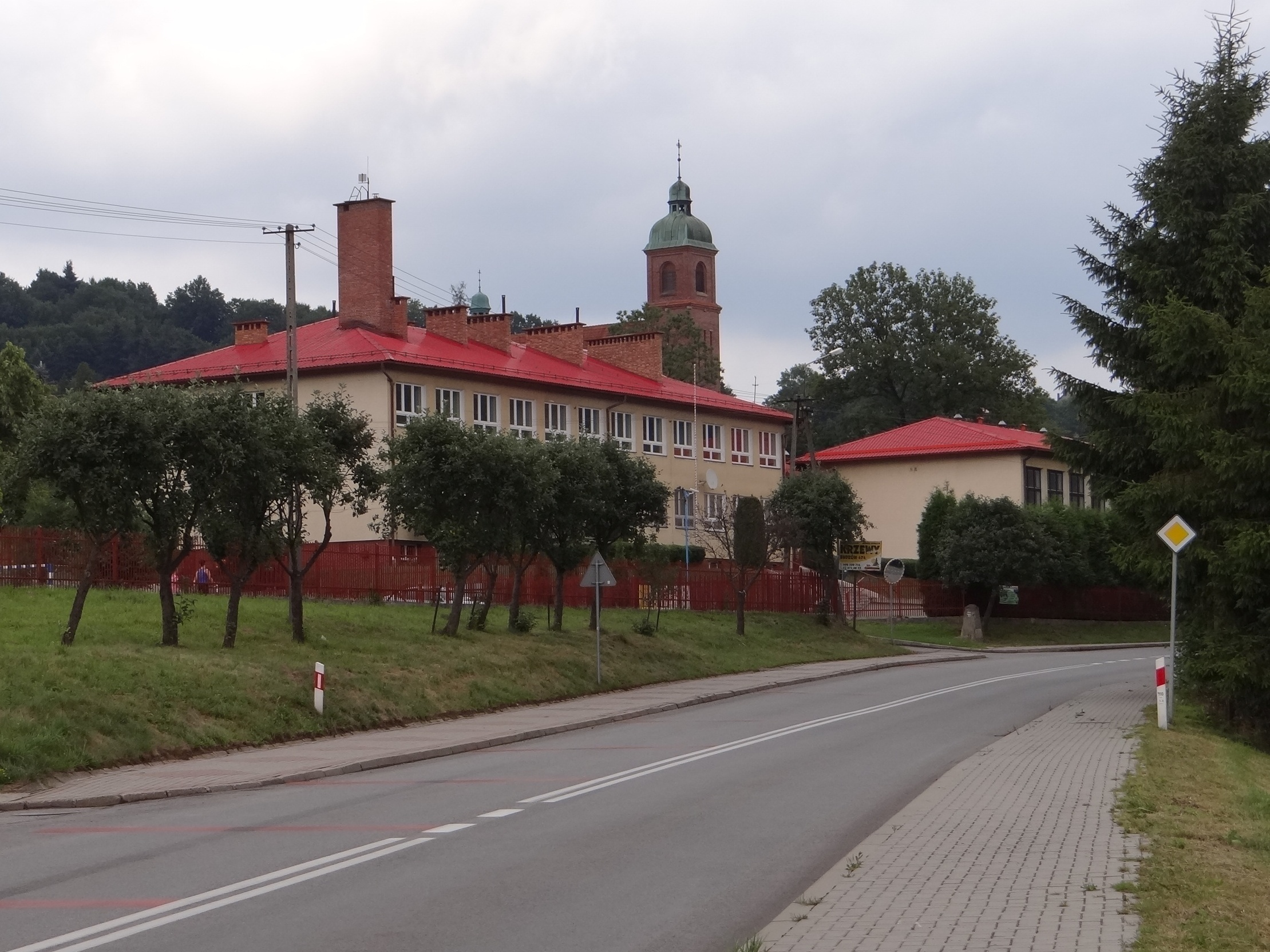

- Location within Poland
- Coordinates: 49°46′40″N 19°40′32″E
- Country: Poland
- Voivodeship: Lesser Poland
- County: Sucha
- Gmina: Budzów
- Population: 2,400

Budzów [ˈbud͡zuf] is a village in Sucha County, Lesser Poland Voivodeship, in southern Poland. It is the seat of the gmina (administrative district) called Gmina Budzów.
