= Gmina Zembrzyce =

Gmina Zembrzyce Zembrzyce Commune
- Gmina
- Flag Coat of arms
- Interactive map of Gmina Zembrzyce
- Coordinates (Zembrzyce): 49°47′N 19°36′E
- Country: Poland
- Voivodeship: Lesser Poland
- County: Sucha
- Seat: Zembrzyce

Area
  - Total: 39.9 km^{2} (15.4 sq mi)

Population (2006)
  - Total: 5,533
  - Density: 139/km^{2} (359/sq mi)
- Website: http://www.zembrzyce.pl

Gmina Zembrzyce is a rural gmina (administrative district) in Sucha County, Lesser Poland Voivodeship, in southern Poland. Its seat is the village of Zembrzyce, which lies approximately 5 kilometres (3 mi) north of Sucha Beskidzka and 40 km (25 mi) south-west of the regional capital Kraków.

The gmina covers an area of 39.9 square kilometres (15.4 sq mi), and as of 2006 its total population is 5,533.

== Villages ==
Gmina Zembrzyce contains the villages and settlements of Marcówka, Śleszowice, Tarnawa Dolna, Tarnawa Górna and Zembrzyce.

== Neighbouring gminas ==
Gmina Zembrzyce is bordered by the town of Sucha Beskidzka and by the gminas of Budzów, Maków Podhalański, Mucharz, Stryszawa, Stryszów and Wadowice.
