= Jachówka =

- Village
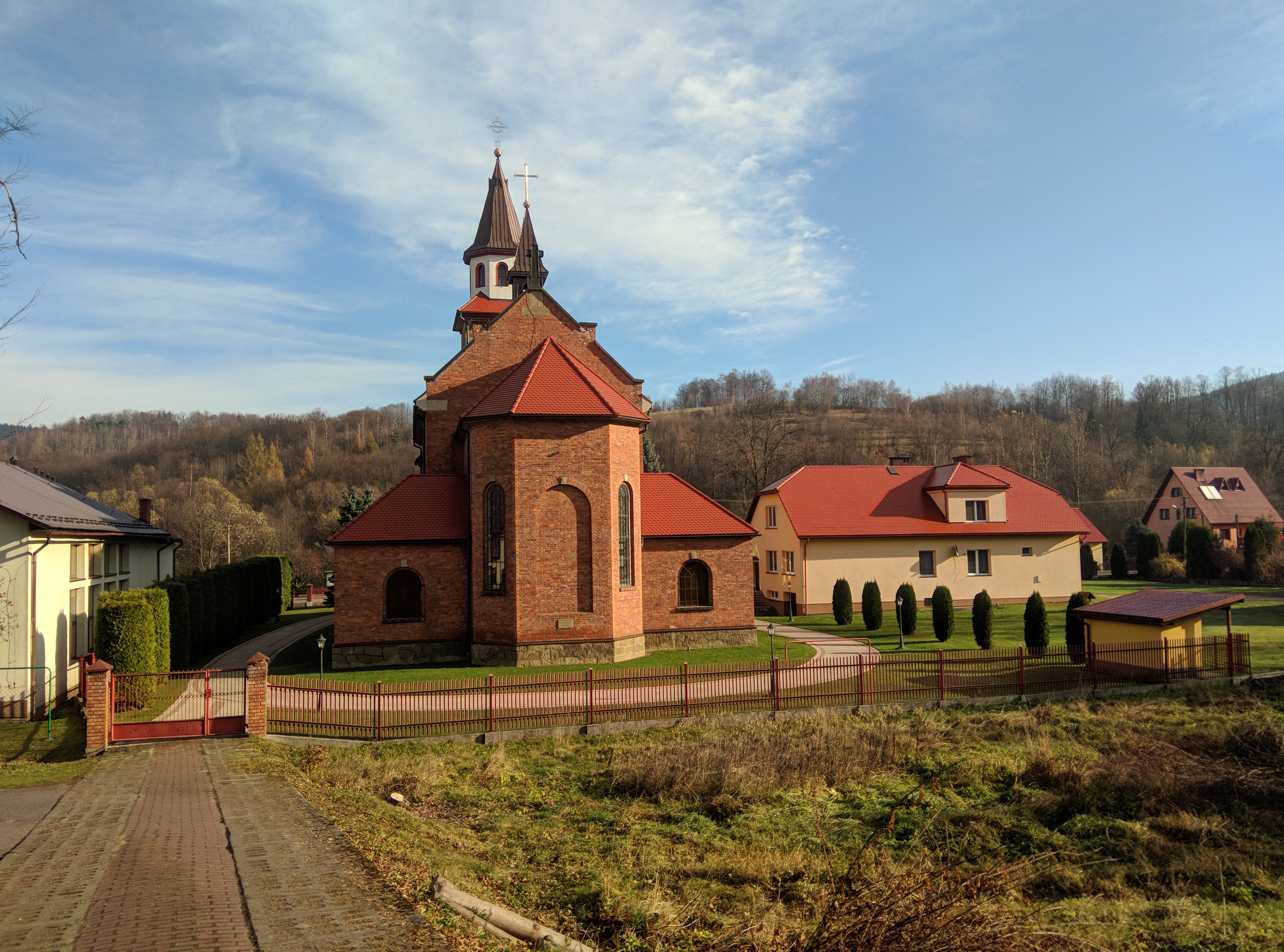
- Catholic church

- Location within Poland
- Coordinates: 49°46′N 19°42′E
- Country: Poland
- Voivodeship: Lesser Poland
- County: Sucha
- Gmina: Budzów
- Elevation: 420 m (1,380 ft)
- Population: 1,000

Jachówka [jaˈxufka] is a village in the administrative district of Gmina Budzów, within Sucha County, Lesser Poland Voivodeship, in southern Poland.
