= Marcówka =

Village in Poland

- Village
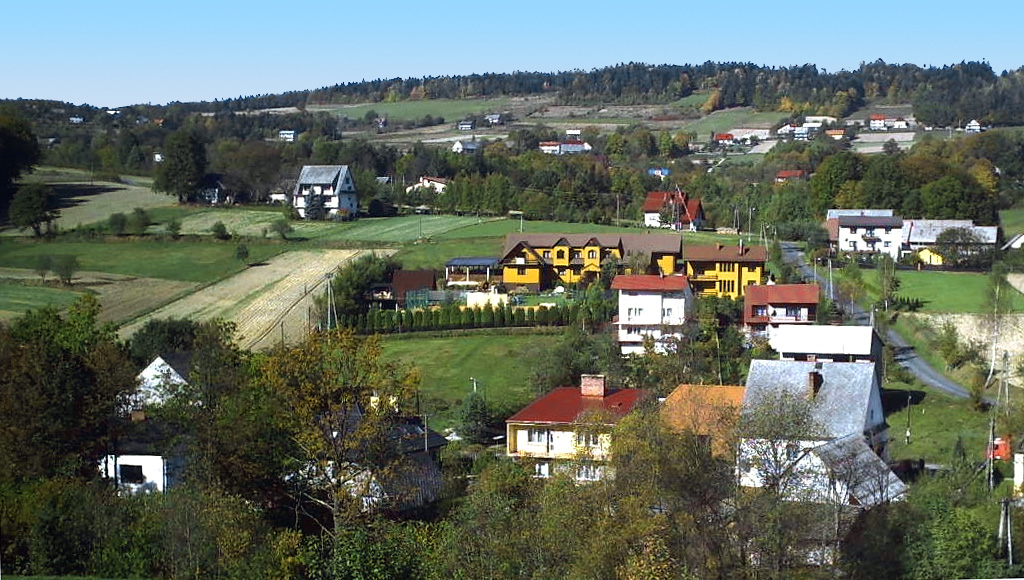
- General view

- Location within Poland
- Coordinates: 49°48′N 19°39′E
- Country: Poland
- Voivodeship: Lesser Poland
- County: Sucha
- Gmina: Zembrzyce

Marcówka [marˈt͡sufka] is a village in the administrative district of Gmina Zembrzyce, within Sucha County, Lesser Poland Voivodeship, in southern Poland.
