= Władysław Hasior =

Polish sculptor, painter and theatre set designer

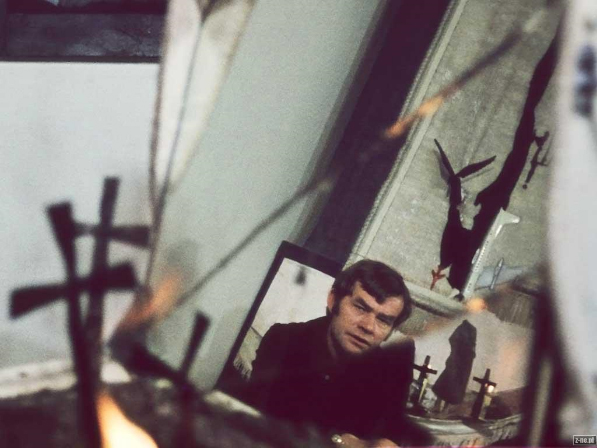
- Władysław Hasior
- Born: 14 May 1928; Nowy Sącz, Poland
- Died: 14 July 1999 (aged 71); Kraków, Poland
- Education: Academy Of Fine Arts In Warsaw
- Known for: Painting, sculpture
- Notable work: Wyszywanie Charakteru (1976 assemblage); Pamięci Dzieci Zamojszczyzny (1973 assemblage)

Władysław Hasior (Polish pronunciation: [vwaˈdɨswaf ˈxaɕɔr]; 14 May 1928 – 14 July 1999) was a Polish sculptor, painter and theatre set designer. He was one of the leading Polish contemporary sculptors connected with the Podhale region.

== Biography ==
Władysław Hasior was born in Nowy Sącz on 14 May 1928. From 1947 to 1952, he studied under Professor Antoni Kenar at the State Secondary School of Visual Art Techniques in Zakopane. In 1952 he started his studies in sculpture at the Academy of Fine Arts in Warsaw. He graduated from the Academy in 1958. From 1959 to 1960, he stayed in Paris as a holder of a scholarship of the French Ministry Culture and studied under Ossip Zadkine. His first individual exhibition was in 1961 at the Jewish Theatre in Warsaw. Since then his works have been displayed at over seventy individual exhibitions in Poland and Europe. In 1968 Hasior had returned to his first school and became a teacher there until 1968.

Hasior’s art meant to provoke and shock the beholder. He continuously experimented with forms, techniques and materials by creating spatial compositions, assemblages and collages. He also authored many unconventional monuments and plein air sculptures, both in Poland and abroad. Since 1984 artist focused on the continuous arrangement of the authors Gallery.

Władysław Hasior died on 14 July 1999, in Kraków. He is buried at the Zakopane Cemetery of the Meritorious at Pęksowy Brzyzek.

== Hasior Museum in Zakopane ==
Gallery devoted to Hasior's work has existed since 1984 and is situated in the interior of the 'deck-chair rental' by the Warszawianka Hotel, a building that was built prior to World War II when Zakopane was an antituberculosis resort and bed rest in the open air was a common form of treatment.

Hasior's Gallery is currently hosted as a branch of the Tatra Museum, which the artist enriched with a "dowry" of around one hundred of his works. These pieces served as the base for the permanent, public exhibition on the ground floor of the building. The host of gallery has continuously developed and altered this collection.

== Education ==
- 1947–1952, High school of Art Techniques in Zakopane
- 1952–1958, Academy of Fine Arts in Warsaw

== Works ==
- Niobe (from Black Fire) (1961) - Museum of Art in Łódź
- St. Sebastian (1962) - National Museum in Poznań
- To the Executed (1962) - National Museum in Poznań
- Fragment of a Hero (1963) - National Museum in Poznań
- The Gardener (1963) - National Museum in Poznań
- series of Banners (1965–1975)
- The Air Raid (1966) - National Museum in Poznań
- Rebel Angel (1966) - National Museum in Poznań
- Golgota (1971)
- Black Song (1972) - National Museum in Poznań
- Embroidery of Character (1972) - National Museum in Poznań
- Wayside Shrine (1974) - National Museum in Poznań
- Dark landscape (1974) - Tatra Museum
- Above Water Vast and Pure (1972) - National Museum in Poznań
- Spring Pegasus (1975) - National Museum in Poznań
- Origins of Bleu Blood (1972) - National Museum in Poznań
- Interrogation of Angel (1980) - Tatra Museum

=== Monuments ===
- For the rescuers in Zakopane(1959)
- Organ on Snozka pass near Czorsztyn (1966)
- Monument to the Executed Hostages from Nowy Sącz in Wrocław (1966)
- Burned Pieta near Copenhagen (1972)
- Firey Birds in Szczecin (1975)
- Solspann / Sun Chariot in Södertälje (1976)
- Burning Birds in Koszalin (1977)

== See also ==
- Culture of Poland

== Bibliography ==
- Anda Rottenberg, Teresa Jabłońska, Marek Pabis, Maciej Buszewicz, Magdalena Iwińska, Władysław Hasior, Olszanica 2004, publisher Bosz, ISBN 83-87730-93-9.
