= Baczyn, Sucha County =

Baczyn
- Village
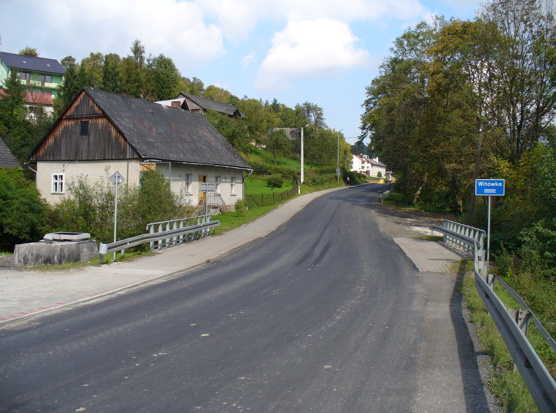

- Location within Poland
- Coordinates: 49°47′20″N 19°43′27″E
- Country: Poland
- Voivodeship: Lesser Poland
- County: Sucha
- Gmina: Budzów
- Population: 840

Baczyn [ˈbat͡ʂɨn] is a village in the administrative district of Gmina Budzów, within Sucha County, Lesser Poland Voivodeship, in southern Poland.
