= Tarnawa Górna, Lesser Poland Voivodeship =

Tarnawa Górna
- Village
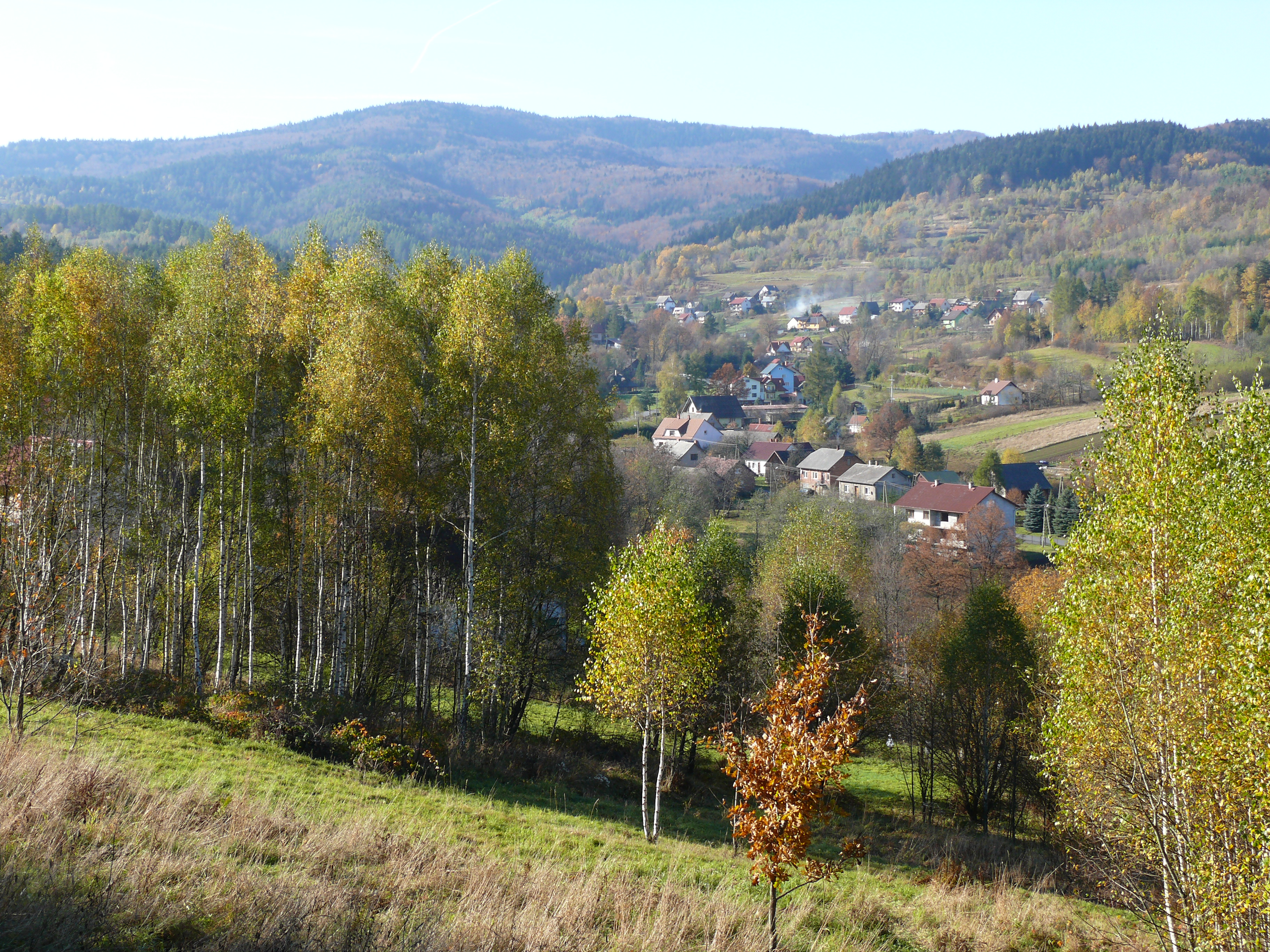
- General view

- Location within Poland
- Coordinates: 49°47′N 19°31′E
- Country: Poland
- Voivodeship: Lesser Poland
- County: Sucha
- Gmina: Zembrzyce
- Established: 17th century

Tarnawa Górna [tarˈnava ˈɡurna] is a village in the administrative district of Gmina Zembrzyce, within Sucha County, Lesser Poland Voivodeship, in southern Poland.

The village was established by Vlachs in the 17th century and was initially known as Rzedz or Rec.
