= Baczyn, Kraków County =

Baczyn
- Village
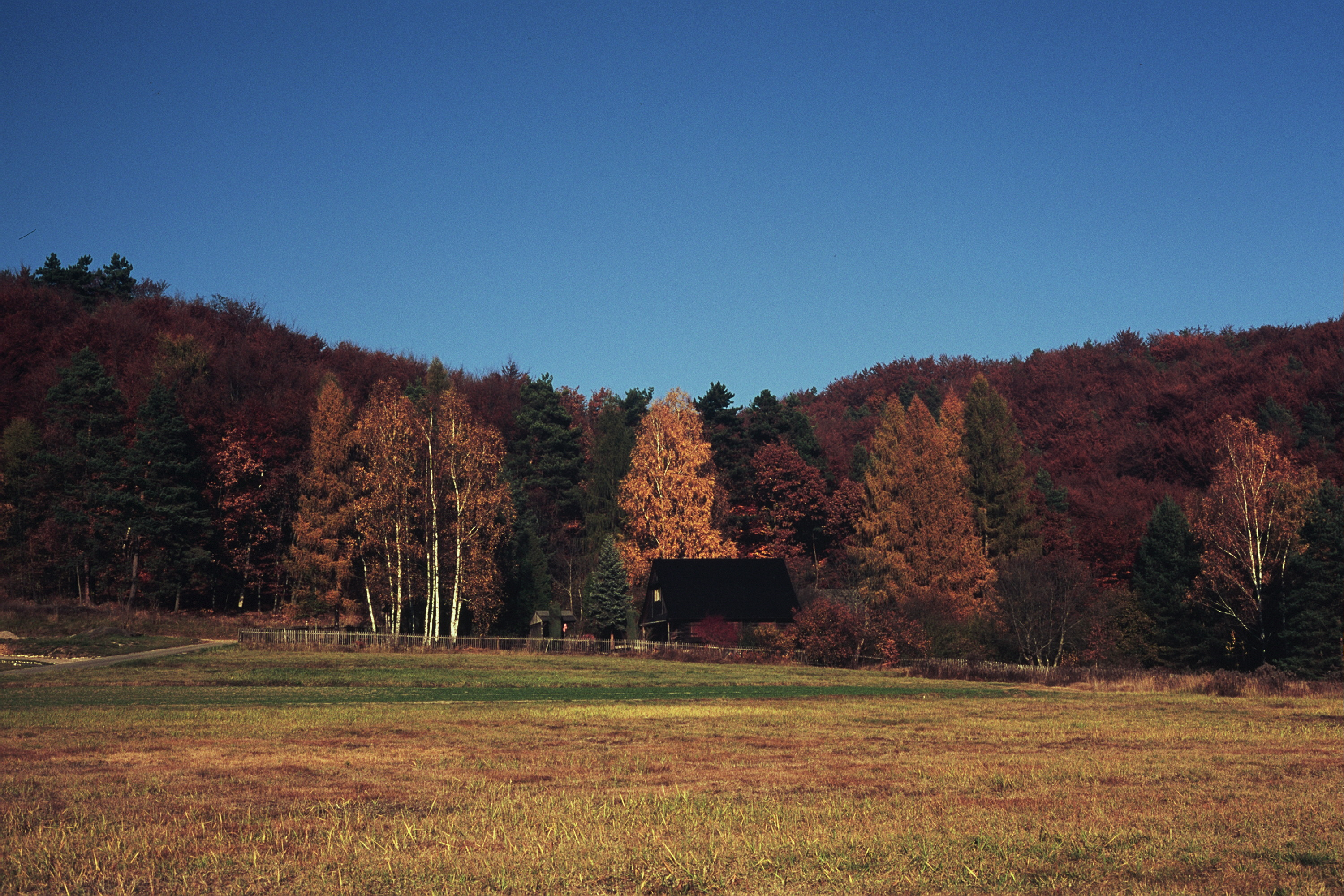
- Baczyn sights

- Location within Poland
- Coordinates: 50°4′38″N 19°41′8″E
- Country: Poland
- Voivodeship: Lesser Poland
- County: Kraków
- Gmina: Liszki
- Population: 163

Baczyn [ˈbat͡ʂɨn] is a village in the administrative district of Gmina Liszki, within Kraków County, Lesser Poland Voivodeship, in southern Poland.
