= Morawica, Lesser Poland Voivodeship =

Morawica
- Village
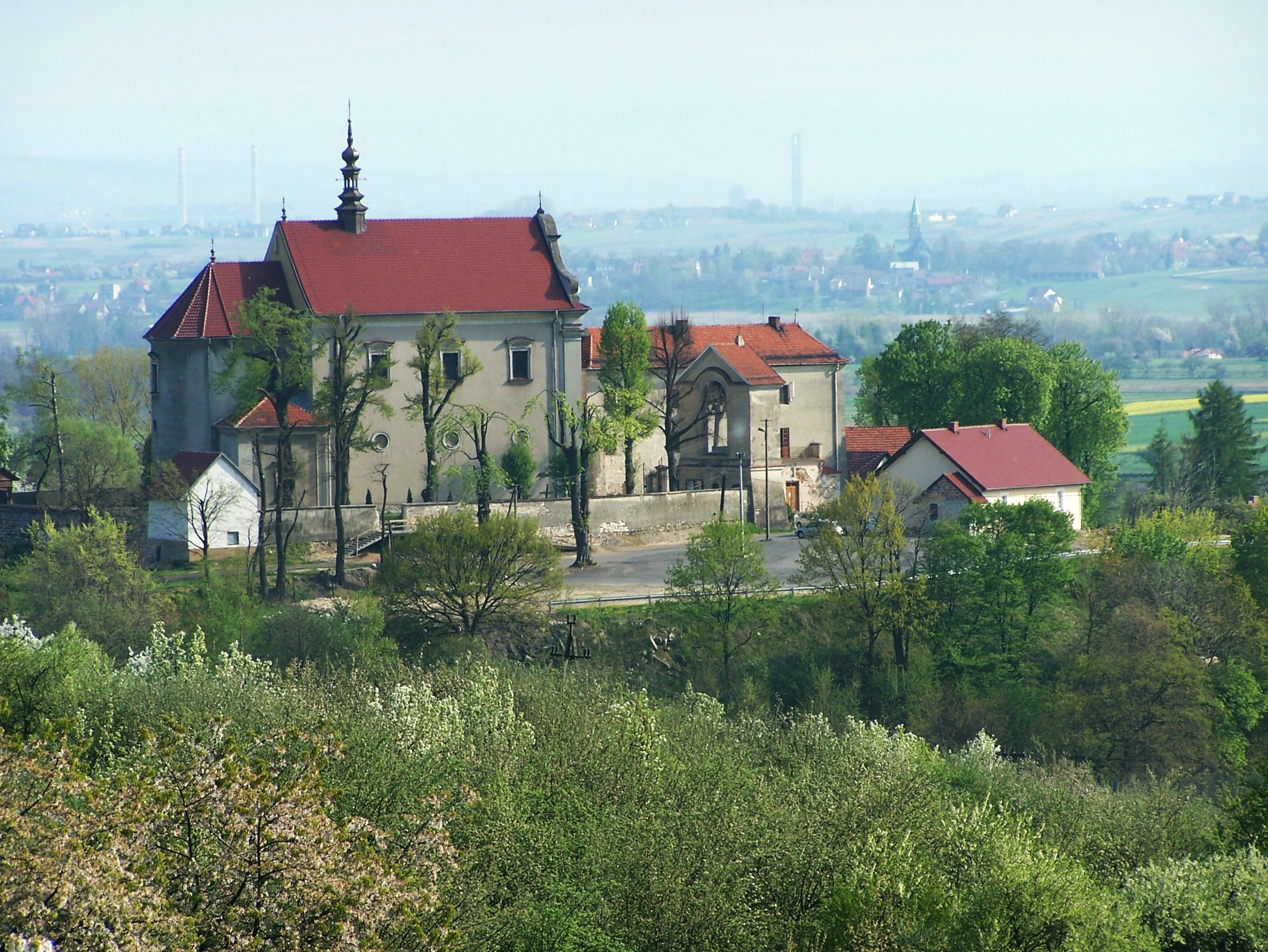
- St. Bartholomew church

- Location within Poland
- Coordinates: 50°4′27″N 19°44′58″E
- Country: Poland
- Voivodeship: Lesser Poland
- County: Kraków
- Gmina: Liszki
- Population: 990

Morawica [mɔraˈvit͡sa] is a village in the administrative district of Gmina Liszki, within Kraków County, Lesser Poland Voivodeship, in southern Poland.
