= Budzyń, Kraków County =

Budzyń
- Village
- Location within Poland
- Coordinates: 50°3′N 19°47′E
- Country: Poland
- Voivodeship: Lesser Poland
- County: Kraków
- Gmina: Liszki
- Population: 350
- Website: http://budzyn.malopolska.pl/

Budzyń [ˈbud͡zɨɲ] is a village in the administrative district of Gmina Liszki, within Kraków County, Lesser Poland Voivodeship, in southern Poland.
