= Piekary, Kraków County =

Piekary
- Village
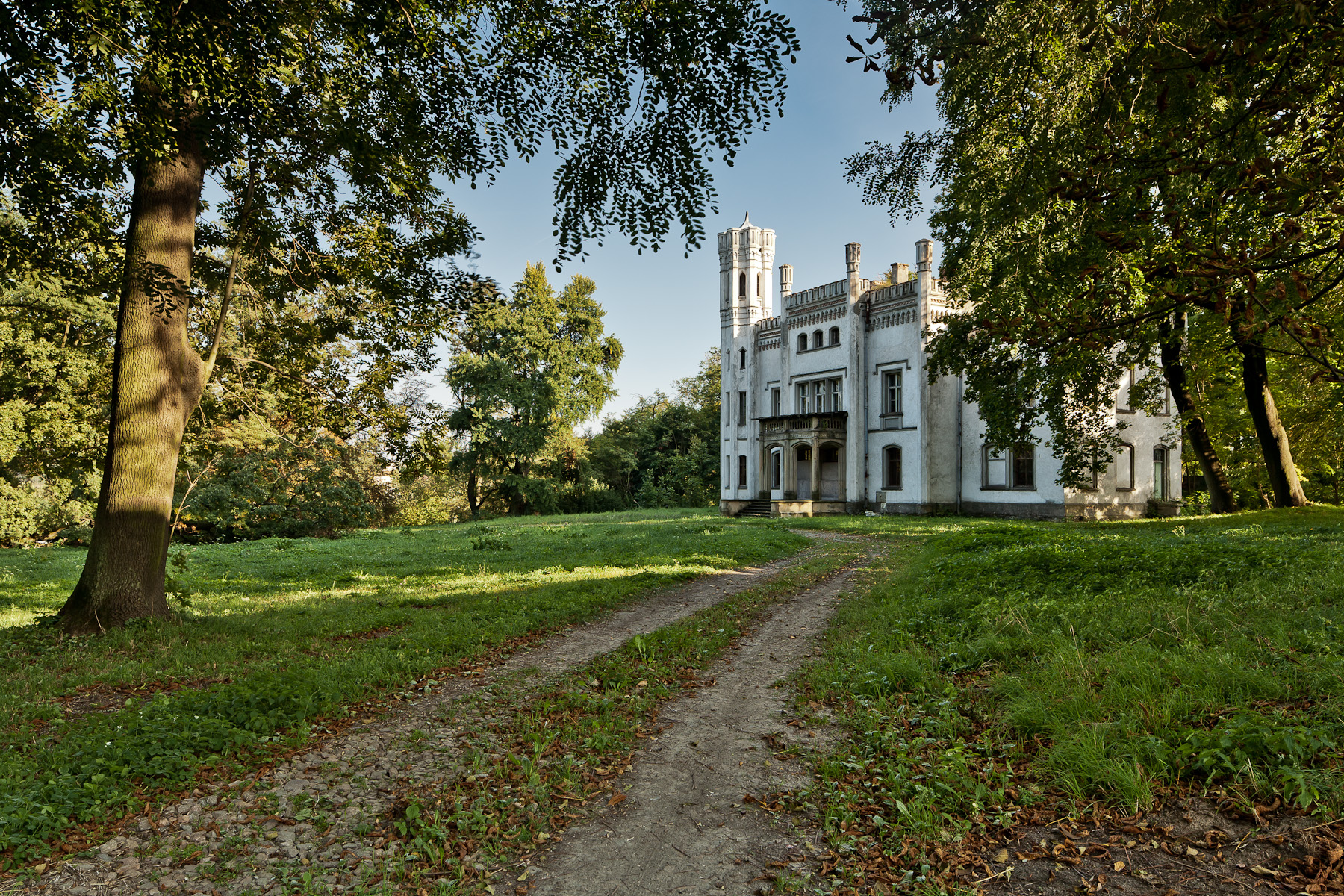
- Palace in Piekary

- Location within Poland
- Coordinates: 50°1′N 19°47′E
- Country: Poland
- Voivodeship: Lesser Poland
- County: Kraków
- Gmina: Liszki
- Population: 1,500
- Website: www.piekary.cba.pl

Piekary [pjɛˈkarɨ] is a village in the administrative district of Gmina Liszki, within Kraków County, Lesser Poland Voivodeship, in southern Poland.
