= Bieńkówka, Lesser Poland Voivodeship =

Bieńkówka
- Village
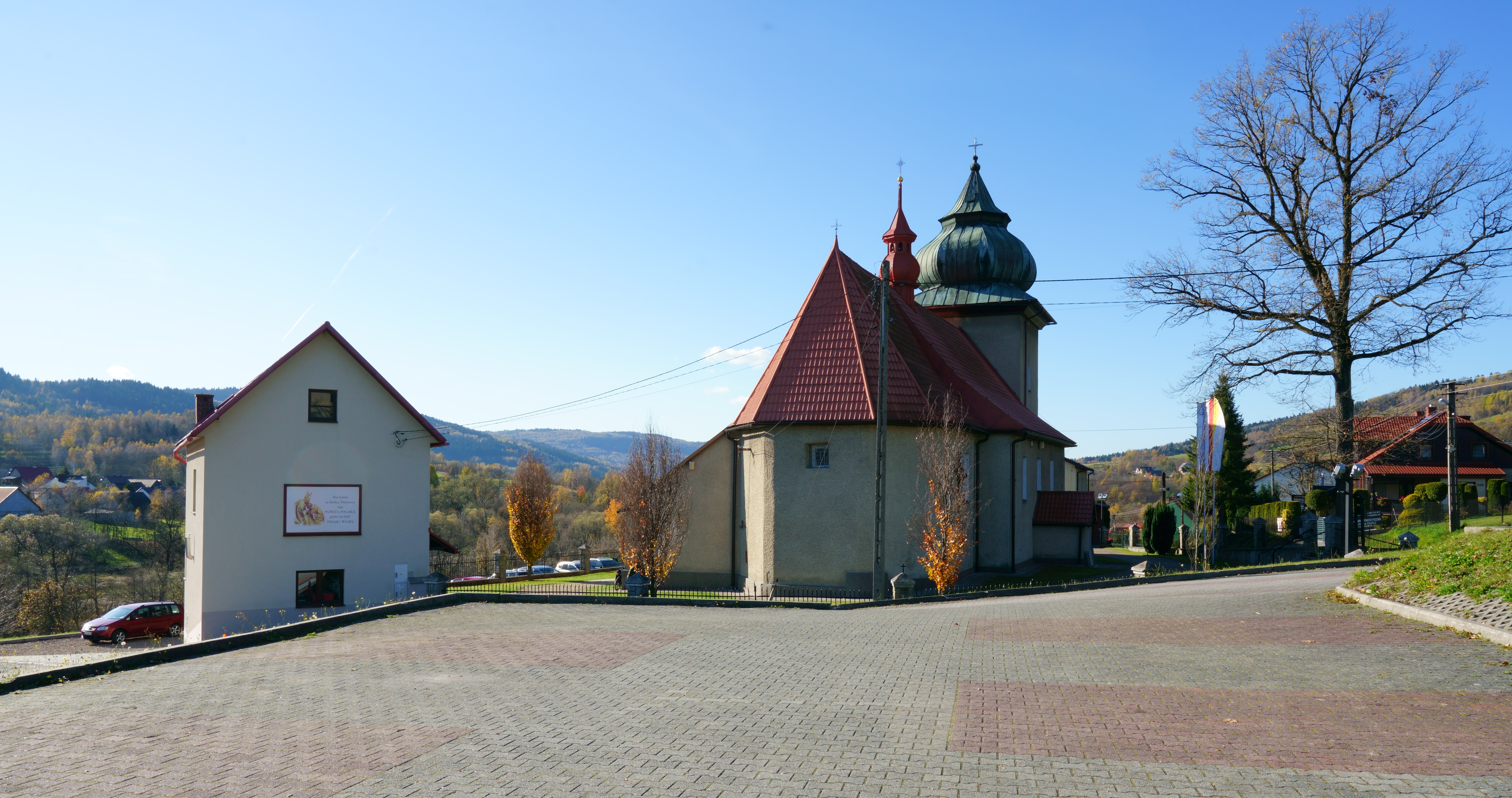

- Location within Poland
- Coordinates: 49°46′32″N 19°46′4″E
- Country: Poland
- Voivodeship: Lesser Poland
- County: Sucha
- Gmina: Budzów
- Population: 2,300
- Website: www.bienkowka.net

Bieńkówka [bjɛɲˈkufka] is a village in the administrative district of Gmina Budzów, within Sucha County, Lesser Poland Voivodeship, in southern Poland.
