= April 2 =

April 2 this year in various calendars
- Thursday, 2 April 2026
Akan	Kuruyaw
Armenian	16 Ahekani 1475
Aztec	Tlaxochimaco 2, 5 Itzcuintli
Babylonian	13 Adaru, 2336 SE
Balinese pawukon	Menga, Pasah, Laba, Wage, Paniron, Wraspati of Watugunung, Brahma, Urungan, Suka
Bengali	19 Chaitro, BS 1432
Chinese	Yang Fire Horse・Horn Mansion; Fire Horse Year, Month 2, Day 15 (Chunfen, 3 days until Qingming)
Common Era	2 April 2026 CE
Coptic	24 Paremhat, AM 1742
Egyptian	21 Mesori, 2774 NE
Ethiopian	24 Magābit, 2018 Amätä Məhrät
French Republican	Décade II, Tridi de Germinal de l'Année 234 de la République
Gregorian	2 April, AD 2026
Hebrew	15 Nisan, AM 5786
Hindu	Hasta・Dhruva; Solar: 20 Caitra, 1947 SE; Lunisolar: Pūrṇimā, Śukla pakṣa of Caitra, 2083 VE; Rāudra・5126 KY・1,872,667
Icelandic	Fimmtudagur, 10 Einmánuður 2025
Islamic	14 Shawwal, AH 1447 (using tabular method)
ISO week date	2026-W14-4
Japanese	15 Kisaragi, Reiwa 8 (Shunbun, 3 days until Seimei)
Julian	20 March, AD 2026 (AM 7534)
Julian day	2461133
Korean	15 Tokkidal, 4359 DE
Maya	13.0.13.8.10; 3 Pop, 5 Oc
Roman	ante diem XIII Kalendas Apriles, MMDCCLXXIX AUC
Solar Hijri	13 Farvardin, SH 1405
Tibetan	16 dbo, me pho rta 2153 or 1772 or 1000

<<	April					>>
Su	Mo	Tu	We	Th	Fr	Sa
			1	2	3	4
5	6	7	8	9	10	11
12	13	14	15	16	17	18
19	20	21	22	23	24	25
26	27	28	29	30
2026

April 2 in recent years
2026 (Thursday)
2025 (Wednesday)
2024 (Tuesday)
2023 (Sunday)
2022 (Saturday)
2021 (Friday)
2020 (Thursday)
2019 (Tuesday)
2018 (Monday)
2017 (Sunday)

April 2 is the 92nd day of the year (93rd in leap years) in the Gregorian calendar; 273 days remain until the end of the year.

== Events ==
=== Pre-1600 ===
- 1107 – Seljuq sultan Muhammad I Tapar begins the siege of Shahdiz, a fortress of the Nizari Ismailis.
- 1285 – Election of Pope Honorius IV following the death of Pope Martin IV.
- 1513 – Having spotted land on March 27, Spanish explorer Juan Ponce de León comes ashore on what is now the U.S. state of Florida, landing somewhere between the modern city of St. Augustine and the mouth of the St. Johns River.

=== 1601–1900 ===
- 1725 – J. S. Bach's cantata Bleib bei uns, denn es will Abend werden, BWV 6, is first performed in Leipzig on Easter Monday.
- 1755 – Commodore William James captures the Maratha fortress of Suvarnadurg on the west coast of India.
- 1792 – The Coinage Act is passed by Congress, establishing the United States Mint.
- 1800 – Ludwig van Beethoven leads the premiere of his First Symphony in Vienna.
- 1801 – French Revolutionary Wars: In the Battle of Copenhagen a British Royal Navy squadron defeats a hastily assembled, smaller, mostly-volunteer Dano-Norwegian Navy at high cost, forcing Denmark out of the Second League of Armed Neutrality.
- 1863 – American Civil War: The largest in a series of Southern bread riots occurs in Richmond, Virginia.
- 1865 – American Civil War: Defeat at the Third Battle of Petersburg forces the Army of Northern Virginia and the Confederate government to abandon Richmond, Virginia.
- 1885 – Canadian Cree warriors attack the village of Frog Lake, killing nine.

=== 1901–present ===
- 1911 – The Australian Bureau of Statistics conducts the country's first national census.
- 1912 – The ill-fated RMS Titanic begins sea trials.
- 1917 – American entry into World War I: President Wilson asks the U.S. Congress for a declaration of war on Germany.
- 1921 – The Autonomous Government of Khorasan, a military government encompassing the modern state of Iran, is established.
- 1930 – After the mysterious death of Empress Zewditu, Haile Selassie is proclaimed emperor of Ethiopia.
- 1969 – LOT Polish Airlines Flight 165 crashes into the Polica mountain near Zawoja, Poland, killing 53.
- 1975 – Vietnam War: Thousands of civilian refugees flee from Quảng Ngãi Province in front of advancing North Vietnamese troops.
- 1976 – Prince Norodom Sihanouk resigns as leader of Cambodia and is placed under house arrest.
- 1979 – A Soviet bio-warfare laboratory at Sverdlovsk accidentally releases airborne anthrax spores, killing 66 plus an unknown amount of livestock.
- 1980 – United States President Jimmy Carter signs the Crude Oil Windfall Profits Tax Act.
- 1982 – Falklands War: Argentina invades the Falkland Islands.
- 1986 – Alabama governor George Wallace, a former segregationist, best known for the "Stand in the Schoolhouse Door", announces that he will not seek a fifth four-year term and will retire from public life upon the end of his term in January 1987.
- 1989 – Soviet leader Mikhail Gorbachev arrives in Havana, Cuba, to meet with Fidel Castro in an attempt to mend strained relations.
- 1991 – Rita Johnston becomes the first female Premier of a Canadian province when she succeeds William Vander Zalm (who had resigned) as Premier of British Columbia.
- 1992 – In New York, Mafia boss John Gotti is convicted of murder and racketeering and is later sentenced to life in prison.
- 1992 – Forty-two civilians are massacred in the town of Bijeljina in Bosnia and Herzegovina.
- 2002 – Israeli forces surround the Church of the Nativity in Bethlehem, into which armed Palestinians had retreated.
- 2004 – Islamist terrorists involved in the 11 March 2004 Madrid attacks attempt to bomb the Spanish high-speed train AVE near Madrid; the attack is thwarted.
- 2006 – Over 60 tornadoes break out in the United States; Tennessee is hardest hit with 29 people killed.
- 2011 – India wins the Cricket World Cup for the second time in history under the captaincy of MS Dhoni.
- 2012 – A mass shooting at Oikos University in California leaves seven people dead and three injured.
- 2012 – UTair Flight 120 crashes after takeoff from Roshchino International Airport in Tyumen, Russia, killing 33 and injuring 10.
- 2014 – A spree shooting occurs at the Fort Hood army base in Texas, with four dead, including the gunman, and 16 others injured.
- 2015 – Gunmen attack Garissa University College in Kenya, killing at least 148 people and wounding 79 others.
- 2015 – Four men steal items worth up to £200 million from an underground safe deposit facility in London's Hatton Garden area in what has been called the "largest burglary in English legal history."
- 2020 – COVID-19 pandemic: The total number of confirmed cases reach one million.
- 2021 – At least 49 people are killed in a train derailment in Taiwan after a truck accidentally rolls onto the track.
- 2021 – A Capitol Police officer is killed and another injured when an attacker rams his car into a barricade outside the United States Capitol.
- 2024 – Viertola school shooting: A 12-year-old pupil is killed and two others injured by a shooter of the same age in Vantaa, Finland.
- 2025 – Liberation Day tariffs: U.S. President Donald Trump announces sweeping worldwide tariffs.

== Births ==
=== Pre-1600 ===
- 181 – Emperor Xian of Han, Chinese emperor (died 234)
- 747 – Charlemagne, Frankish king (died 814)
- 1473 – John Corvinus, Hungarian noble (died 1504)
- 1545 – Elisabeth of Valois, queen consort of Spain (died 1568)
- 1565 – Cornelis de Houtman, Dutch explorer (died 1599)
- 1586 – Pietro Della Valle, Italian traveler (died 1652)

=== 1601–1900 ===
- 1602 – Mary of Jesus of Ágreda, Franciscan abbess (died 1665)
- 1618 – Francesco Maria Grimaldi, Italian mathematician and physicist (died 1663)
- 1647 – Maria Sibylla Merian, German-Dutch botanist and illustrator (died 1717)
- 1653 – Prince George of Denmark, Duke of Cumberland (died 1708)
- 1696 – Francesca Cuzzoni, Italian operatic soprano (died 1778)
- 1719 – Johann Wilhelm Ludwig Gleim, German poet (died 1803)
- 1725 – Giacomo Casanova, Italian explorer and author (died 1798)
- 1755 – Jean Anthelme Brillat-Savarin, French lawyer and politician (died 1826)
- 1788 – Francisco Balagtas, Filipino poet and author (died 1862)
- 1788 – Wilhelmine Reichard, German balloonist (died 1848)
- 1789 – Lucio Norberto Mansilla, Argentinian general and politician (died 1871)
- 1792 – Francisco de Paula Santander, Colombian general and politician, 4th President of the Republic of the New Granada (died 1840)
- 1797 – Samuel Bogart, Texas state legislator (died 1861)
- 1798 – August Heinrich Hoffmann von Fallersleben, German poet and academic (died 1874)
- 1805 – Hans Christian Andersen, Danish novelist, short story writer, and poet (died 1875)
- 1814 – Erastus Brigham Bigelow, American inventor (died 1879)
- 1827 – William Holman Hunt, English soldier and painter (died 1910)
- 1835 – Jacob Nash Victor, American engineer (died 1907)
- 1838 – Léon Gambetta, French lawyer and politician, 45th Prime Minister of France (died 1882)
- 1840 – Émile Zola, French novelist, playwright, journalist (died 1902)
- 1841 – Clément Ader, French engineer, designed the Ader Avion III (died 1926)
- 1842 – Dominic Savio, Italian Catholic saint, adolescent student of Saint John Bosco (died 1857)
- 1861 – Iván Persa, Slovenian priest and author (died 1935)
- 1862 – Nicholas Murray Butler, American philosopher and academic, Nobel Prize laureate (died 1947)
- 1869 – Hughie Jennings, American baseball player and manager (died 1928)
- 1870 – Edmund Dwyer-Gray, Irish-Australian politician, 29th Premier of Tasmania (died 1945)
- 1875 – Walter Chrysler, American businessman, founded Chrysler (died 1940)
- 1875 – William Donne, English cricketer and captain (died 1942)
- 1884 – J. C. Squire, English poet, author, and historian (died 1958)
- 1888 – Neville Cardus, English cricket and music writer (died 1975)
- 1891 – Jack Buchanan, Scottish entertainer (died 1957)
- 1891 – Max Ernst, German painter, sculptor, and poet (died 1976)
- 1891 – Tristão de Bragança Cunha, Indian nationalist and anti-colonial activist from Goa (died 1958)
- 1896 – Johnny Golden, American golfer (died 1936)
- 1898 – Harindranath Chattopadhyay, Indian poet, actor and politician (died 1990)
- 1900 – Roberto Arlt, Argentinian journalist, author, and playwright (died 1942)
- 1900 – Anis Fuleihan, Cypriot-American pianist, composer, and conductor (died 1970)
- 1900 – Alfred Strange, English footballer (died 1978)

=== 1901–present ===
- 1902 – Jan Tschichold, German-Swiss graphic designer and typographer (died 1974)
- 1902 – Menachem Mendel Schneerson, the seventh Lubavitcher Rebbe (died 1994)
- 1903 – Lionel Chevrier, Canadian lawyer and politician, 27th Canadian Minister of Justice (died 1987)
- 1906 – Alphonse-Marie Parent, Canadian priest and educator (died 1970)
- 1907 – Harald Andersson, American-Swedish discus thrower (died 1985)
- 1907 – Luke Appling, American baseball player and manager (died 1991)
- 1908 – Buddy Ebsen, American actor and dancer (died 2003)
- 1910 – Paul Triquet, Canadian general, Victoria Cross recipient (died 1980)
- 1910 – Chico Xavier, Brazilian spiritual medium (died 2002)
- 1914 – Alec Guinness, English actor (died 2000)
- 1919 – Delfo Cabrera, Argentinian runner and soldier (died 1981)
- 1920 – Gerald Bouey, Canadian lieutenant and civil servant (died 2004)
- 1920 – Jack Stokes, English animator and director (died 2013)
- 1920 – Jack Webb, American actor, director, producer, and screenwriter (died 1982)
- 1922 – John C. Whitehead, American banker and politician, 9th United States Deputy Secretary of State (died 2015)
- 1923 – Gloria Henry, actress (died 2021)
- 1923 – Johnny Paton, Scottish footballer, coach, and manager (died 2015)
- 1923 – G. Spencer-Brown, English mathematician, psychologist, and author (died 2016)
- 1924 – Bobby Ávila, Mexican baseball player (died 2004)
- 1925 – George MacDonald Fraser, Scottish author and screenwriter (died 2008)
- 1925 – Hans Rosenthal, German radio and television host (died 1987)
- 1926 – Jack Brabham, Australian race car driver (died 2014)
- 1926 – Rudra Rajasingham, Sri Lankan police officer and diplomat (died 2006)
- 1927 – Carmen Basilio, American boxer and soldier (died 2012)
- 1927 – Howard Callaway, American soldier and politician, 11th United States Secretary of the Army (died 2014)
- 1927 – Rita Gam, American actress (died 2016)
- 1928 – Serge Gainsbourg, French singer-songwriter, actor, and director (died 1991)
- 1929 – Ed Dorn, American poet and educator (died 1999)
- 1931 – Keith Hitchins, American historian (died 2020)
- 1931 – Vladimir Kuznetsov, Russian javelin thrower (died 1986)
- 1932 – Edward Egan, American cardinal (died 2015)
- 1933 – György Konrád, Hungarian sociologist and author (died 2019)
- 1934 – Paul Cohen, American mathematician and theorist (died 2007)
- 1934 – Brian Glover, English wrestler and actor (died 1997)
- 1934 – Carl Kasell, American journalist and game show host (died 2018)
- 1936 – Shaul Ladany, Serbian-Israeli race walker and engineer
- 1937 – Dick Radatz, American baseball player (died 2005)
- 1938 – John Larsson, Swedish 17th General of The Salvation Army (died 2022)
- 1938 – Booker Little, American trumpet player and composer (died 1961)
- 1938 – Al Weis, American baseball player
- 1939 – Marvin Gaye, American singer-songwriter (died 1984)
- 1939 – Anthony Lake, American academic and diplomat, 18th United States National Security Advisor
- 1939 – Lise Thibault, Canadian journalist and politician, 27th Lieutenant Governor of Quebec
- 1940 – Donald Jackson, Canadian figure skater and coach
- 1940 – Mike Hailwood, English motorcycle racer (died 1981)
- 1940 – Penelope Keith, English actress (died 2026)
- 1941 – Dr. Demento, American radio host
- 1941 – Sonny Throckmorton, American country singer-songwriter
- 1942 – Leon Russell, American singer-songwriter and pianist (died 2016)
- 1942 – Roshan Seth, Indian-English actor
- 1943 – Caterina Bueno, Italian singer (died 2007)
- 1943 – Larry Coryell, American jazz guitarist (died 2017)
- 1943 – Antonio Sabàto, Sr., Italian actor (died 2021)
- 1944 – Bill Malinchak, American football player
- 1945 – Jürgen Drews, German singer-songwriter
- 1945 – Guy Fréquelin, French race car driver
- 1945 – Linda Hunt, American actress
- 1945 – Reggie Smith, American baseball player and coach
- 1945 – Don Sutton, American baseball player and sportscaster (died 2021)
- 1945 – Anne Waldman, American poet
- 1946 – Richard Collinge, New Zealand cricketer
- 1947 – Paquita la del Barrio, Mexican singer, songwriter and actress (died 2025)
- 1947 – Tua Forsström, Finnish writer
- 1947 – Emmylou Harris, American singer-songwriter and guitarist
- 1947 – Camille Paglia, American author and critic
- 1948 – Roald Als, Danish author and illustrator
- 1948 – Dimitris Mitropanos, Greek singer (died 2012)
- 1948 – Daniel Okrent, American journalist and author
- 1948 – Joan D. Vinge, American author
- 1949 – Paul Gambaccini, American-English radio and television host
- 1949 – Bernd Müller, German footballer
- 1949 – Pamela Reed, American actress
- 1949 – David Robinson, American drummer
- 1950 – Lynn Westmoreland, American politician
- 1951 – Ayako Okamoto, Japanese golfer
- 1952 – Lennart Fagerlund, Swedish cyclist
- 1953 – Jim Allister, Northern Irish lawyer and politician
- 1953 – Rosemary Bryant Mariner, 20th and 21st-century U.S. Navy aviator (died 2019)
- 1953 – Malika Oufkir, Moroccan Berber writer
- 1953 – Debralee Scott, American actress (died 2005)
- 1953 – James Vance, American author and playwright (died 2017)
- 1954 – Gregory Abbott, American singer-songwriter and producer
- 1954 – Donald Petrie, American actor and director
- 1955 – Michael Stone, Northern Irish loyalist paramilitary
- 1957 – Caroline Dean, English biologist and academic
- 1957 – Hank Steinbrenner, American businessman (died 2020)
- 1958 – Stefano Bettarello, Italian rugby player
- 1958 – Larry Drew, American basketball player and coach
- 1959 – Gelindo Bordin, Italian runner
- 1959 – David Frankel, American director, producer, and screenwriter
- 1959 – Juha Kankkunen, Finnish race car driver
- 1959 – Yves Lavandier, French director and producer
- 1959 – Badou Ezzaki, Moroccan footballer and manager
- 1960 – Linford Christie, Jamaican-English sprinter
- 1960 – Brad Jones, Australian race car driver
- 1960 – Pascale Nadeau, Canadian journalist
- 1961 – Buddy Jewell, American singer-songwriter
- 1961 – Christopher Meloni, American actor
- 1961 – Keren Woodward, English singer-songwriter
- 1962 – Pierre Carles, French director and producer
- 1962 – Billy Dean, American singer-songwriter and guitarist
- 1962 – Clark Gregg, American actor
- 1963 – Karl Beattie, English director and producer
- 1963 – Mike Gascoyne, English engineer
- 1964 – Pete Incaviglia, American baseball player and coach
- 1964 – Jonathon Sharkey, American wrestler
- 1965 – Rodney King, American victim of police brutality (died 2012)
- 1966 – Bill Romanowski, American football player and actor
- 1966 – Teddy Sheringham, English international footballer and coach
- 1967 – Greg Camp, American singer-songwriter and guitarist
- 1967 – Phil Demmel, American guitarist and songwriter
- 1969 – Ajay Devgn, Indian actor, director, and producer
- 1971 – Edmundo Alves de Souza Neto, Brazilian footballer
- 1971 – Jason Lewry, English cricketer
- 1971 – Todd Woodbridge, Australian tennis player and sportscaster
- 1972 – Eyal Berkovic, Israeli footballer
- 1972 – Remo D'Souza, Indian choreographer and dancer
- 1972 – Calvin Davis, American sprinter and hurdler (died 2023)
- 1972 – Zane Lamprey, American actor, director, producer, and screenwriter
- 1973 – Dmitry Lipartov, Russian footballer
- 1973 – Roselyn Sánchez, Puerto Rican-American actress
- 1973 – Aleksejs Semjonovs, Latvian footballer
- 1974 – Tayfun Korkut, Turkish football manager and former player
- 1975 – Nate Huffman, American basketball player (died 2015)
- 1975 – Randy Livingston, American basketball player
- 1975 – Katrin Rutschow-Stomporowski, German rower
- 1975 – Pattie Mallette, Canadian author and film producer
- 1975 – Pedro Pascal, Chilean and American actor
- 1976 – Andreas Anastasopoulos, Greek shot putter
- 1976 – Rory Sabbatini, South African golfer
- 1977 – Per Elofsson, Swedish skier
- 1977 – Michael Fassbender, German-Irish actor and producer
- 1977 – Hanno Pevkur, Estonian lawyer and politician, Estonian Minister of Justice
- 1980 – Avi Benedi, Israeli singer and songwriter
- 1980 – Adam Fleming, Scottish journalist
- 1980 – Gavin Heffernan, Canadian director and screenwriter
- 1980 – Ricky Hendrick, American race car driver (died 2004)
- 1980 – Wairangi Koopu, New Zealand rugby league player
- 1980 – Carlos Salcido, Mexican international footballer
- 1981 – Michael Clarke, Australian cricketer
- 1981 – Kapil Sharma, Indian stand-up comedian, television presenter and actor
- 1982 – Marco Amelia, Italian footballer
- 1982 – David Ferrer, Spanish tennis player
- 1983 – Arthur Boka, Ivorian footballer
- 1983 – Maksym Mazuryk, Ukrainian pole vaulter
- 1984 – Engin Atsür, Turkish basketball player
- 1984 – Nóra Barta, Hungarian diver
- 1984 – Jérémy Morel, French footballer
- 1984 – Miguel Ángel Moyá, Spanish footballer
- 1985 – Thom Evans, Zimbabwean-Scottish rugby player
- 1985 – Stéphane Lambiel, Swiss figure skater
- 1986 – Ibrahim Afellay, Dutch footballer
- 1986 – Andris Biedriņš, Latvian basketball player
- 1986 – Drew Van Acker, American actor, model and producer
- 1987 – Pablo Aguilar, Paraguayan footballer
- 1987 – Shane Lowry, Irish Professional Golfer, winner of the 2019 Open Championship and European Team Member for the 2021 and 2023 Ryder Cups
- 1988 – Ellen Adarna, Filipino actress, model and public figure
- 1988 – Renée Good, American writer, poet and shooting victim (died 2026)
- 1988 – Jesse Plemons, American actor
- 1990 – Yevgeniya Kanayeva, Russian gymnast
- 1990 – Miralem Pjanić, Bosnian footballer
- 1990 – Amr El Solia, Egyptian footballer
- 1991 – Quavo, American rapper
- 1993 – Keshorn Walcott, Trinidadian javelin thrower
- 1993 – Bruno Zuculini, Argentine footballer
- 1994 – Pascal Siakam, Cameroonian basketball player
- 1995 – Zack Steffen, American soccer player
- 1996 – Zach Bryan, American singer-songwriter
- 1996 – André Onana, Cameroonian footballer
- 1997 – Dillon Bassett, American race car driver
- 1997 – Abdelhak Nouri, Dutch footballer
- 1997 – Austin Riley, American baseball player
- 2000 – Rodrigo Riquelme, Spanish footballer
- 2000 – Josip Stanišić, Croatian footballer
- 2002 – Emma Myers, American actress
- 2004 – Diana Shnaider, Russian tennis player
- 2005 – Adrián Liso, Spanish footballer
- 2007 – Brenda Fruhvirtová, Czech tennis player

== Deaths ==
=== Pre-1600 ===
- 670 – Hasan ibn Ali the second Shia Imam (born 624)
- 870 – Æbbe the Younger, Frankish abbess
- 872 – Muflih al-Turki, Turkish general
- 968 – Yuan Dezhao, Chinese chancellor (born 891)
- 991 – Bardas Skleros, Byzantine general
- 1118 – Baldwin I, king of Jerusalem
- 1244 – Henrik Harpestræng, Danish botanical and medical author
- 1272 – Richard, 1st Earl of Cornwall, English husband of Sanchia of Provence (born 1209)
- 1335 – Henry of Bohemia (born 1265)
- 1412 – Ruy González de Clavijo, Spanish explorer and author
- 1416 – Ferdinand I, king of Aragon (born 1379)
- 1502 – Arthur, prince of Wales (born 1486)
- 1507 – Francis of Paola, Italian friar and saint, founded the Order of the Minims (born 1416)
- 1511 – Bernard VII, Lord of Lippe, German nobleman (born 1428)

=== 1601–1900 ===
- 1640 – Maciej Kazimierz Sarbiewski, Polish author and poet (born 1595)
- 1657 – Ferdinand III, Holy Roman Emperor (born 1608)
- 1657 – Jean-Jacques Olier, French priest, founded the Society of Saint-Sulpice (born 1608)
- 1672 – Pedro Calungsod, Filipino missionary and saint (born 1654)
- 1672 – Diego Luis de San Vitores, Spanish Jesuit missionary (born 1627)
- 1720 – Joseph Dudley, English politician, Governor of the Province of Massachusetts Bay (born 1647)
- 1742 – James Douglas, Scottish physician and anatomist (born 1675)
- 1747 – Johann Jacob Dillenius, German-English botanist and mycologist (born 1684)
- 1754 – Thomas Carte, English historian and author (born 1686)
- 1787 – Thomas Gage, English general and politician, Governor of the Province of Massachusetts Bay (born 1719)
- 1791 – Honoré Gabriel Riqueti, comte de Mirabeau, French journalist and politician (born 1749)
- 1801 – Thomas Dadford, Jr., English engineer (born 1761)
- 1803 – Sir James Montgomery, 1st Baronet, Scottish judge and politician (born 1721)
- 1817 – Johann Heinrich Jung, German author and academic (born 1740)
- 1827 – Ludwig Heinrich Bojanus, German physician and educator (born 1776)
- 1845 – Philip Charles Durham, Scottish admiral and politician (born 1763)
- 1865 – A. P. Hill, American general (born 1825)
- 1872 – Samuel Morse, American painter and academic, invented the Morse code (born 1791)
- 1891 – Albert Pike, American lawyer and general (born 1809)
- 1891 – Ahmed Vefik Pasha, Greek playwright and politician, 249th Grand Vizier of the Ottoman Empire (born 1823)
- 1894 – Achille Vianelli, Italian painter and academic (born 1803)
- 1896 – Theodore Robinson, American painter and academic (born 1852)

=== 1901–present ===
- 1914 – Paul Heyse, German author, poet, and translator, Nobel Prize laureate (born 1830)
- 1917 – Bryn Lewis, Welsh international rugby player (born 1891)
- 1923 – Topal Osman, Turkish colonel (born 1883)
- 1928 – Theodore William Richards, American chemist and academic, Nobel Prize laureate (born 1868)
- 1930 – Zewditu I of Ethiopia (born 1876)
- 1933 – Ranjitsinhji, Indian cricketer (born 1872)
- 1936 – Jean Baptiste Eugène Estienne, French general (born 1860)
- 1942 – Édouard Estaunié, French novelist (born 1862)
- 1948 – Sabahattin Ali, Turkish journalist, author, and poet (born 1907)
- 1953 – Hugo Sperrle, German field marshal (born 1885)
- 1954 – Hoyt Vandenberg, US Air Force general (born 1899)
- 1966 – C. S. Forester, English novelist (born 1899)
- 1972 – Franz Halder, German general (born 1884)
- 1974 – Georges Pompidou, French banker and politician, 19th President of France (born 1911)
- 1977 – Walter Wolf, German academic and politician (born 1907)
- 1987 – Buddy Rich, American drummer, songwriter, and bandleader (born 1917)
- 1989 – Manolis Angelopoulos, Greek singer (born 1939)
- 1992 – Juanito, Spanish footballer and manager (born 1954)
- 1992 – Jan van Aartsen, Dutch politician (born 1909)
- 1994 – Betty Furness, American actress, consumer advocate, game show panelist, television journalist and television personality (born 1916)
- 1994 – Marc Fitch, British historian and philanthropist (born 1908)
- 1995 – Hannes Alfvén, Swedish physicist and engineer, Nobel Prize laureate (born 1908)
- 1997 – Tomoyuki Tanaka, Japanese director and producer (born 1910)
- 1998 – Rob Pilatus, American-German singer-songwriter (born 1965)
- 2001 – Charles Daudelin, Canadian sculptor and painter (born 1920)
- 2002 – Levi Celerio, Filipino composer and songwriter (born 1910)
- 2002 – John R. Pierce, American engineer and author (born 1910)
- 2003 – Edwin Starr, American singer-songwriter (born 1942)
- 2004 – John Argyris, Greek computer scientist, engineer, and academic (born 1913)
- 2005 – Lillian O'Donnell, American crime novelist (born 1926)
- 2005 – Pope John Paul II (born 1920)
- 2006 – Lloyd Searwar, Guyanese anthologist and diplomat (born 1925)
- 2007 – Henry L. Giclas, American astronomer and academic (born 1910)
- 2008 – Yakup Satar, Turkish World War I veteran (born 1898)
- 2009 – Albert Sanschagrin, Canadian bishop (born 1911)
- 2009 – Bud Shank, American saxophonist and flute player (born 1926)
- 2010 – Chris Kanyon, American wrestler (born 1970)
- 2011 – John C. Haas, American businessman and philanthropist (born 1918)
- 2012 – Jesús Aguilarte, Venezuelan captain and politician (born 1959)
- 2012 – Elizabeth Catlett, American-Mexican sculptor and illustrator (born 1915)
- 2012 – Mauricio Lasansky, American graphic designer and academic (born 1914)
- 2013 – Fred, French author and illustrator (born 1931)
- 2013 – Jesús Franco, Spanish director, screenwriter, producer, and actor (born 1930)
- 2013 – Milo O'Shea, Irish-American actor (born 1926)
- 2014 – Urs Widmer, Swiss author and playwright (born 1938)
- 2015 – Manoel de Oliveira, Portuguese actor, director, producer, and screenwriter (born 1908)
- 2015 – Robert H. Schuller, American pastor and author (born 1926)
- 2015 – Steve Stevaert, Belgian businessman and politician, Governor of Limburg (born 1954)
- 2016 – Gallieno Ferri, Italian comic book artist and illustrator (born 1929)
- 2016 – Robert Abajyan, Armenian sergeant (born 1996)
- 2017 – Alma Delia Fuentes, Mexican actress (born 1937)
- 2021 – Simon Bainbridge, British composer (born 1952)
- 2022 – Estelle Harris, American actress and comedian (born 1928)
- 2024 – Jerry Abbott, American country music songwriter and record producer (born 1942)
- 2024 – John Barth, American writer (born 1930)
- 2024 – Maryse Condé, Guadeloupean novelist, critic, and playwright (born 1934)
- 2024 – Christopher Durang, American playwright (born 1949)
- 2024 – Larry Lucchino, American attorney and baseball executive (born 1945)
- 2024 – John Sinclair, American poet (born 1941)
- 2024 – Juan Vicente Pérez, Venezuelan supercentenarian (born 1909)
- 2025 – Khamtai Siphandone, Laotian politician, 4th President of Laos (born 1924)

== Holidays and observances ==
- Christian feast day:
  - Abundius of Como
  - Amphianus of Lycia
  - Æbbe the Younger
  - Bronach of Glen-Seichis (Irish martyrology)
  - Blessed Elisabetta Vendramini
  - Francis of Paola
  - Francisco Coll Guitart
  - Henry Budd (Anglican Church of Canada)
  - Blessed Laura Evangelista Alvarado Cardozo
  - Blessed Nicholas Charnetsky
  - Nicetius of Lyon
  - Theodosia of Tyre
  - Urban of Langres
  - Blessed Vilmos Apor
  - April 2 (Eastern Orthodox liturgics)
- International Children's Book Day (International)
- Thai Heritage Conservation Day (Thailand)
- Unity of Peoples of Russia and Belarus Day (Belarus)
- World Autism Awareness Day (International)
- Malvinas Day (Argentina)

== Bibliography ==
- Watkins, Basil (2015). The Book of Saints: A Comprehensive Biographical Dictionary. Bloomsbury Academic. p. 3. ISBN 978-0-567-66414-3.
