= Feliks Franić =

Polish painter, lawyer, and judge

Feliks Franić or Franicz (born 14 January 1871 in Maków, died on 8 January 1937 in Kraków) was a Polish painter, lawyer, and a judge of the court of appeal.

His father, a professional officer serving in Galicia, was a Croat, hence the atypical surname which often involved spelling problems (one of the Franić family tombstones bears its surname ending with "ch"). Franić mother, Anna von Victorin, descended from a family with Italian-Austrian roots which had lived in Poland for generations. She died two months after giving birth. Feliks, brought up by his father, grew up in Maków Podhalański.

He studied painting with Jan Matejko, and then with Wojciech Kossak. His works enjoyed considerable interest in the Kraków artistic milieu.

In 1888 and 1892 he exhibited his paintings "After the Cavalry Fight", "Two Outposts" and "The Outpost" at the Kraków Society of Friends of Fine Arts. He also took part in the Polish Legions' exhibition in 1916 and the Exhibition of the Independent in 1929.

He painted primarily military-oriented works, battle scenes depicting Napoleonic campaigns, national uprisings, and Polish Legions. His favorite motif were horses, often alongside knights, hussars or soldiers of the Napoleonic era. He also painted landscapes.

During his lifetime he never staged an individual exhibition, though his drawings and paintings were published on postcards.

Feliks Franić works

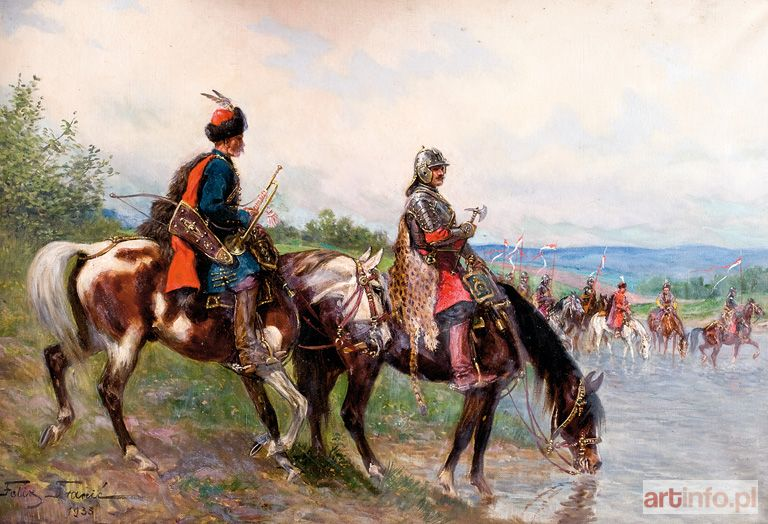

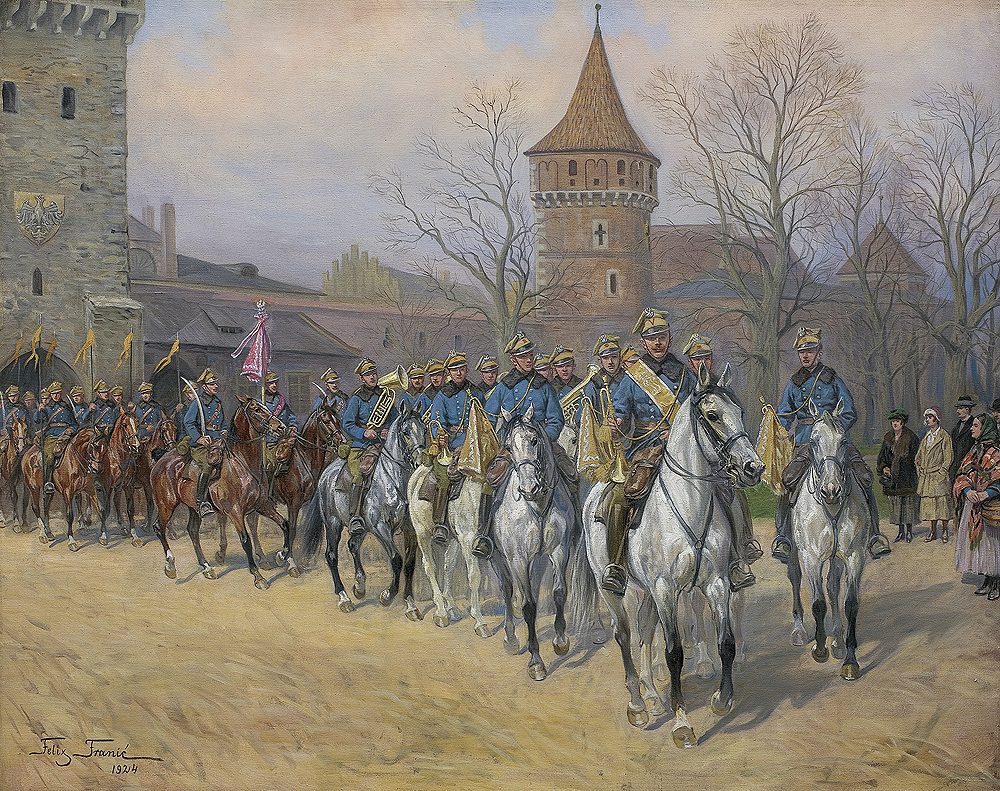

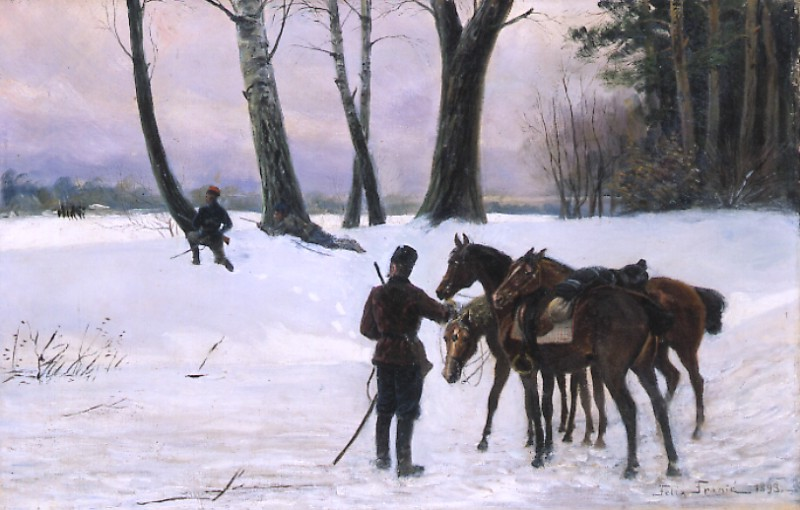
