= Gronie, Sucha County =

Gronie
- Village
- Location within Poland
- Coordinates: 49°40′09″N 19°43′17″E
- Country: Poland
- Voivodeship: Lesser Poland
- County: Sucha
- Gmina: Maków Podhalański

Gronie is a village in the administrative district of Gmina Maków Podhalański, within Sucha County, Lesser Poland Voivodeship, in southern Poland.
