= Zawoja =

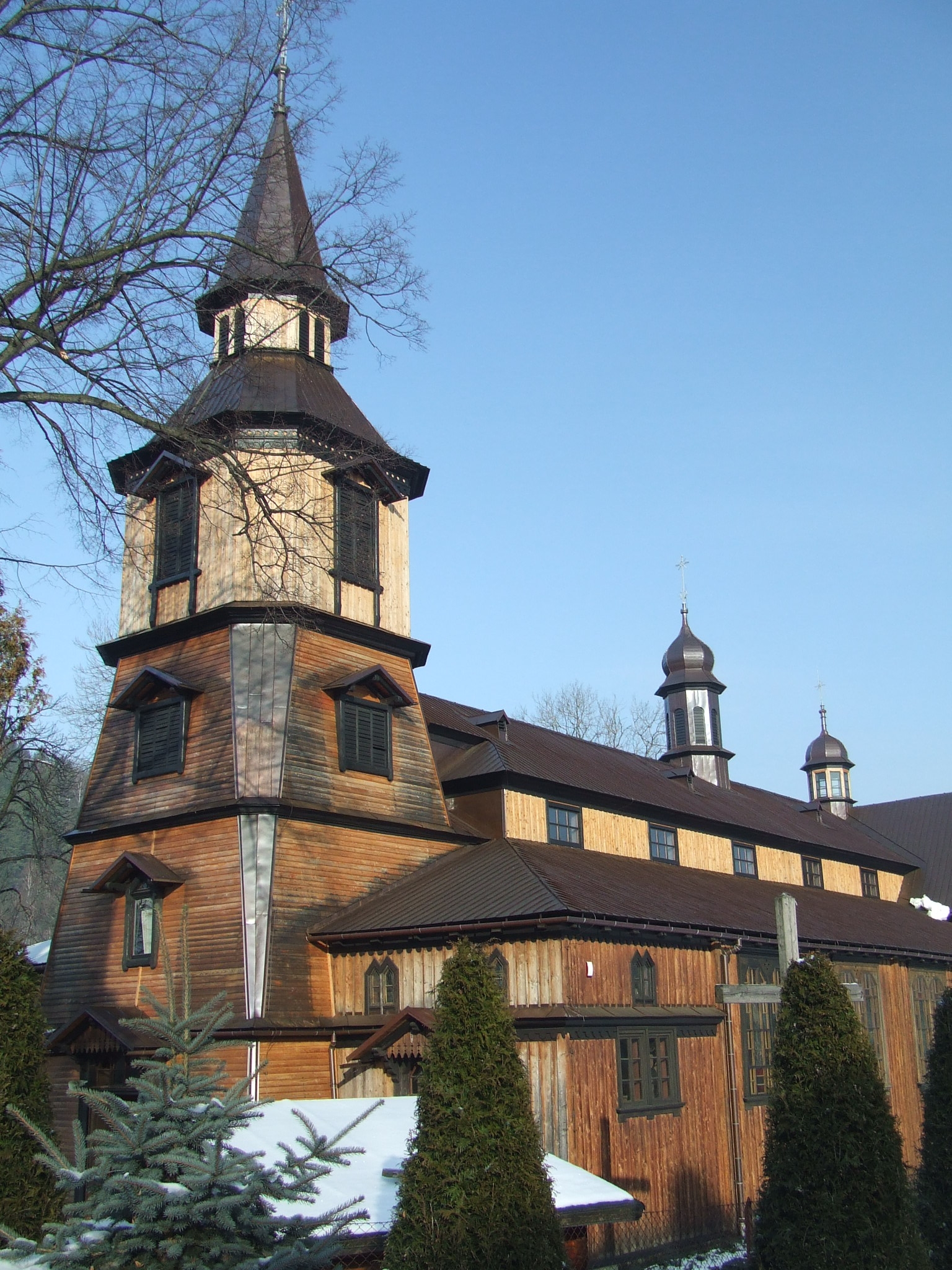
- Catholic church

- Location within Poland
- Coordinates: 49°40′N 19°34′E
- Country: Poland
- Voivodeship: Lesser Poland
- County: Sucha County
- Gmina: Gmina Zawoja

Population
  - Total: 7,400
- Time zone: UTC+1 (CET)
  - Summer (DST): UTC+2 (CEST)
- Postal code: 34-222, 34-223
- Area code: +48 33
- Car plates: KSU
- Website: www.zawoja.pl

Zawoja [zaˈvɔja] is a village in southern Poland located close to Maków Podhalański. It is situated in Sucha County (Lesser Poland Voivodeship). With neighbouring village of Skawica it constitutes a rural Zawoja Commune. It has 7,400 inhabitants and is one of the biggest Polish villages. It is also considered the longest one as it stretches for about 19 kilometres in a picturesque mountain valley.

It is situated close to a mountain massif of Babia Góra (1725 m). The headquarters of Babia Góra National Park is located here. Since 19th century Zawoja is one of the important mountain resorts in Poland. It is known for its wooden architecture and folk culture of Babia Góra Gorals.

== See also ==
- LOT Polish Airlines Flight LO 165 crashed on the nearby Polica mountain
