= Juszczyn =

Juszczyn may refer to the following places in Poland:

- Juszczyn, Lower Silesian Voivodeship (south-west Poland)
- Juszczyn, Lesser Poland Voivodeship (south Poland)
