= LOT Polish Airlines Flight 165 =

LOT Polish Airlines Flight 165 may refer to:

- LOT Polish Airlines Flight 165 (1978)
- LOT Polish Airlines Flight 165 (1969)
