= Andrzej Bargiel =

Polish ski mountaineer and climber

Andrzej Leszek Bargiel
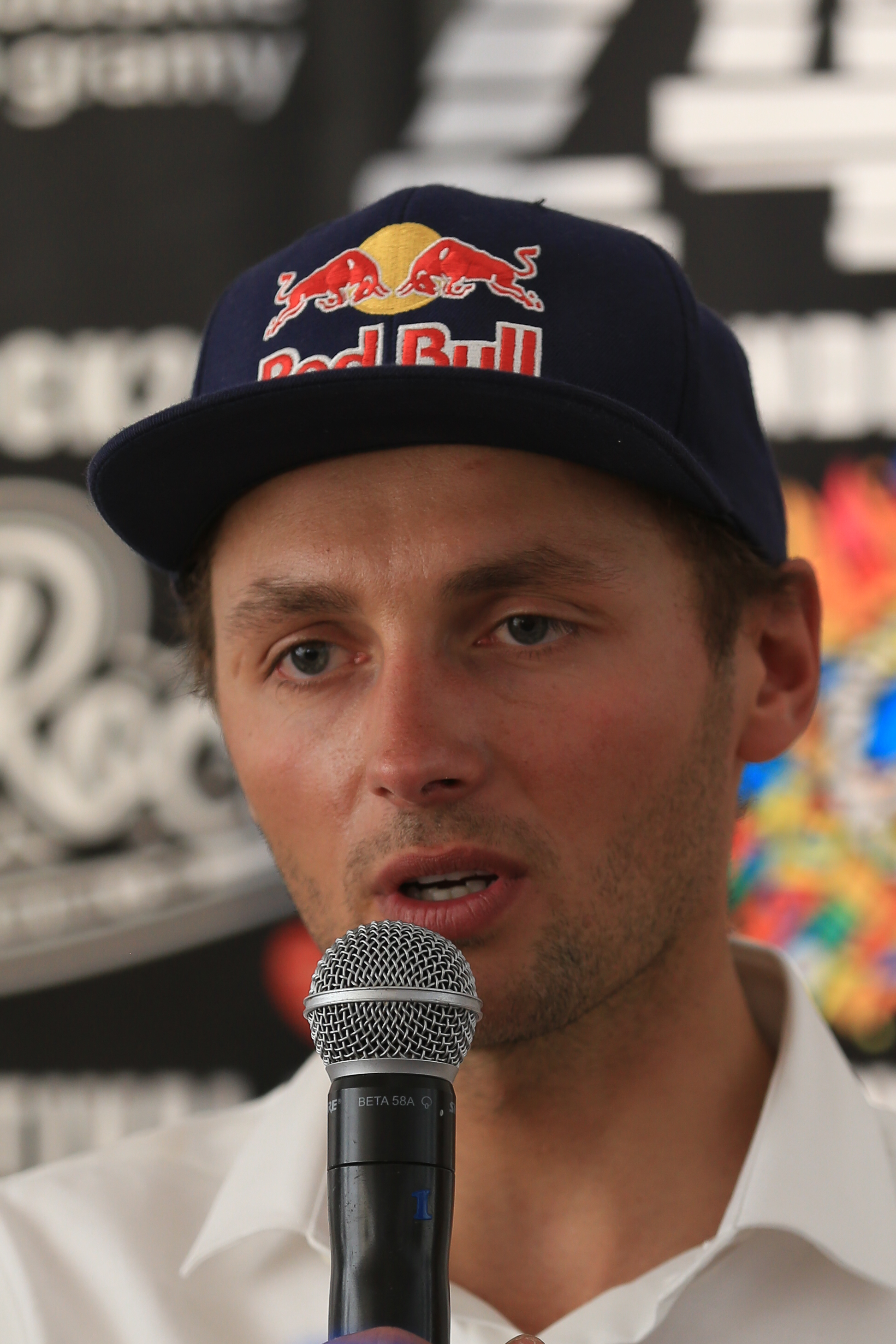
- Andrzej Bargiel at the Pol'and'Rock Festival 2018

Personal information
- Nationality: Polish
- Born: 18 April 1988 (age 38) Łętownia, Poland
- Occupations: Ski mountaineer, climber, backcountry skier, mountain runner
- Website: Official website

Andrzej Leszek Bargiel (Polish pronunciation: [ˈandʐɛj ˈlɛʂɛɡ ˈbarɡʲɛl]; born 18 April 1988, in Łętownia, Poland) is a Polish ski mountaineer, backcountry skier, mountain runner and climber, who became the first person in history to climb and ski from the summit of Everest without any bottled oxygen.

Raised in Łętownia, he is a three-time Polish ski mountaineering champion and held third place in the overall World Cup. He is the current record holder in taking the least time to achieve the Snow Leopard award. He is also the current record holder in the Elbrus Race. Since 2013, he has been running his original HIC SUNT LEONES (“here are lions” in Latin) project, the goal of which are speedy, oxygenless ascents and ski descents from the highest mountains on Earth. These included Shishapangma in 2013, Manaslu in 2014, Broad Peak in 2015, K2 in 2018, Gasherbrum II and Gasherbrum I in 2023, and Nanga Parbat in 2026.

He is the first person to ski all eight-thousanders in the Karakoram range. He permanently lives in Zakopane, Poland.

== Achievements ==
- 2009, 8th, 2009 European Championship of Ski Mountaineering relay race (together with Szymon Zachwieja, Jacek Żebracki and Mariusz Wargocki)
- 2010:
  - 9th, Pierra Menta (together with Peter Svätojánsky)
  - 10th ("ISMF men" ranking), Patrouille des Glaciers together with Jacek Żylka-Żebracki and Mariusz Wargocki
  - 1st - record on Elbrus Race (Extreme route, 3:23:37)
- 2013, October 2 – he is the first Pole to have made a ski descent of Shishapangma (central summit)
- 2014, September 25 – he set a record time climbing from base camp to the summit of Manaslu in 14 hours 5 minutes. He also set a record time for base-peak-base at 21 hours 14 minutes (on skis).
- 2015, July 25 – he was the first person to climb and ski down Broad Peak
- 2016: Winning the Snow Leopard award in record time - 29 days 17 hours 5 minutes from the start of the ABC July 15
  - Lenin Peak - July 16 (ascent from Advanced BC at the height of 4400 meters to the summit in 13 hours 30 minutes and exit from the summit on skis to ABC in 2 hours).
  - Peak Korzhenevskaya - July 25 (ascent from Moskvina BC at the height of 4350 meters to the summit in 8 hours 40 minutes; exit from the summit on skis for the snow line and the descent to the base camp).
  - Ismoil Somoni Peak - August 2 (ascent from Moskvina BC at the height of 4350 meters to the summit in 14 hours 25 minutes; exit from the summit on skis for the snow line and the descent to the base camp).
  - Khan Tengri - August 10 (ascent from the South Inylchek BC at an altitude of 4070 meters to the summit in 8 hours 17 minutes; descent on skis from an altitude of about 6300 m).
  - Jengish Chokusu - August 14, 12:35 local time, descent on skis.
- 2017, May 21 - Skiing Mallory's Couloir of the north face Aiguille du Midi

World's first ski descent of K2 with Andrzej Bargiel

- 2018, July 22 - First man in history to ski from the summit of K2 to base camp without removing skis.
- 2019, September 30 – due to safety issues he stopped the Everest Ski Challenge expedition.
- 2021:
  - April 30, first ascent of Yawash Sar II, followed by a ski descent.
  - May 10, partial ski descent from the summit of Laila Peak (Hushe Valley).
- 2023:
  - July 19, ski descent from the summit of Gasherbrum II.
  - July 26, ski descent from the summit of Gasherbrum I - becomes the first person to ever ski all eight-thousanders in the Karakoram range.
- 2024, Andes and Patagonia Ski Expedition.
- 2025, September 23 - First person in history to climb and ski from the summit of Everest without bottled oxygen.
- 2026, June 30 - First person in history to complete a continuous ski descent from the summit of Nanga Parbat after climbing it without supplemental oxygen.

== Selected prizes ==
In February 2019, Andrzej Bargiel was named National Geographic Adventurer of the Year.
