= Gmina Zawoja =

Gmina Zawoja Zawoja Commune
- Gmina
- Flag Coat of arms
- Interactive map of Gmina Zawoja
- Coordinates (Zawoja): 49°40′N 19°34′E
- Country: Poland
- Voivodeship: Lesser Poland
- County: Sucha
- Seat: Zawoja

Area
  - Total: 128.8 km^{2} (49.7 sq mi)

Population (2006)
  - Total: 8,849
  - Density: 68.70/km^{2} (177.9/sq mi)
- Website: http://www.zawoja.pl

Gmina Zawoja is a rural gmina (administrative district) in Sucha County, Lesser Poland Voivodeship, in southern Poland, on the Slovak border. Its seat is the village of Zawoja, which lies approximately 9 kilometres (6 mi) south of Sucha Beskidzka and 52 km (32 mi) south-west of the regional capital Kraków. The gmina also contains the village of Skawica.

The gmina covers an area of 128.8 square kilometres (49.7 sq mi), and as of 2006 its total population is 8,849.

== Neighbouring gminas ==
Gmina Zawoja is bordered by the gminas of Bystra-Sidzina, Jabłonka, Koszarawa, Lipnica Wielka, Maków Podhalański and Stryszawa. It also borders Slovakia.
