= Sidzina =

- Village
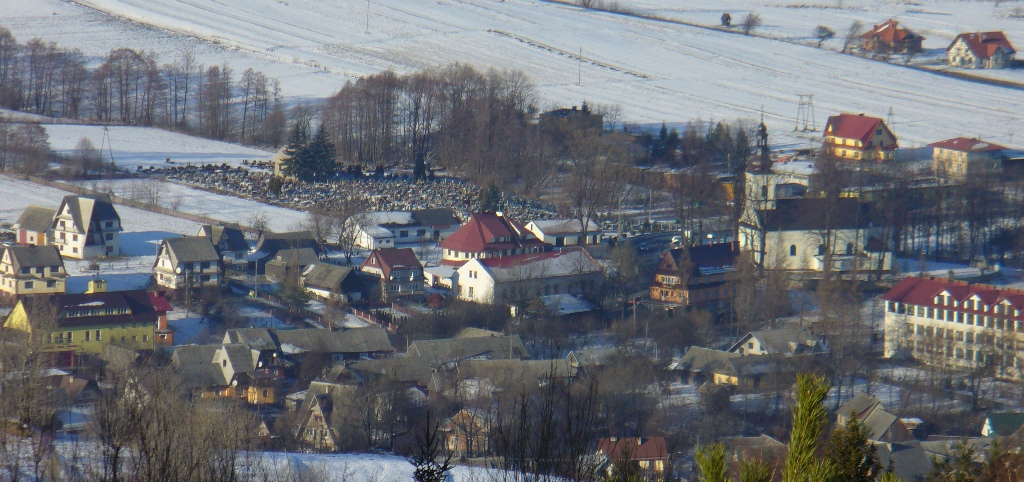
- Centre of Sidzina

- Location within Poland
- Coordinates: 49°36′31.2″N 19°43′33.2″E
- Country: Poland
- Voivodeship: Lesser Poland
- County: Sucha
- Gmina: Bystra-Sidzina
- Settled: 23 April 1563

Government
  - Sołtys: Bolesław Czarny

Population (2006)
  - Total: 3,200
- Time zone: UTC+1 (CET)
  - Summer (DST): UTC+2 (CEST)
- Postal code: 34-236
- Area code: +48 18
- Car plates: KSU

Sidzina [ɕiˈd͡ʑina] is a large village with a population of around 3,200, situated in southern Poland, in Gmina Bystra-Sidzina, Sucha Beskidza County, Lesser Poland Voivodeship.
