= Wieprzec, Lesser Poland Voivodeship =

Wieprzec
- Village
- Location within Poland
- Coordinates: 49°42′58″N 19°46′10″E
- Country: Poland
- Voivodeship: Lesser Poland
- County: Sucha
- Gmina: Maków Podhalański
- Population: 428

Wieprzec [ˈvjɛpʂɛt͡s] is a village in the administrative district of Gmina Maków Podhalański, within Sucha County, Lesser Poland Voivodeship, in southern Poland.
