= Toporzysko, Lesser Poland Voivodeship =

Toporzysko
- Village
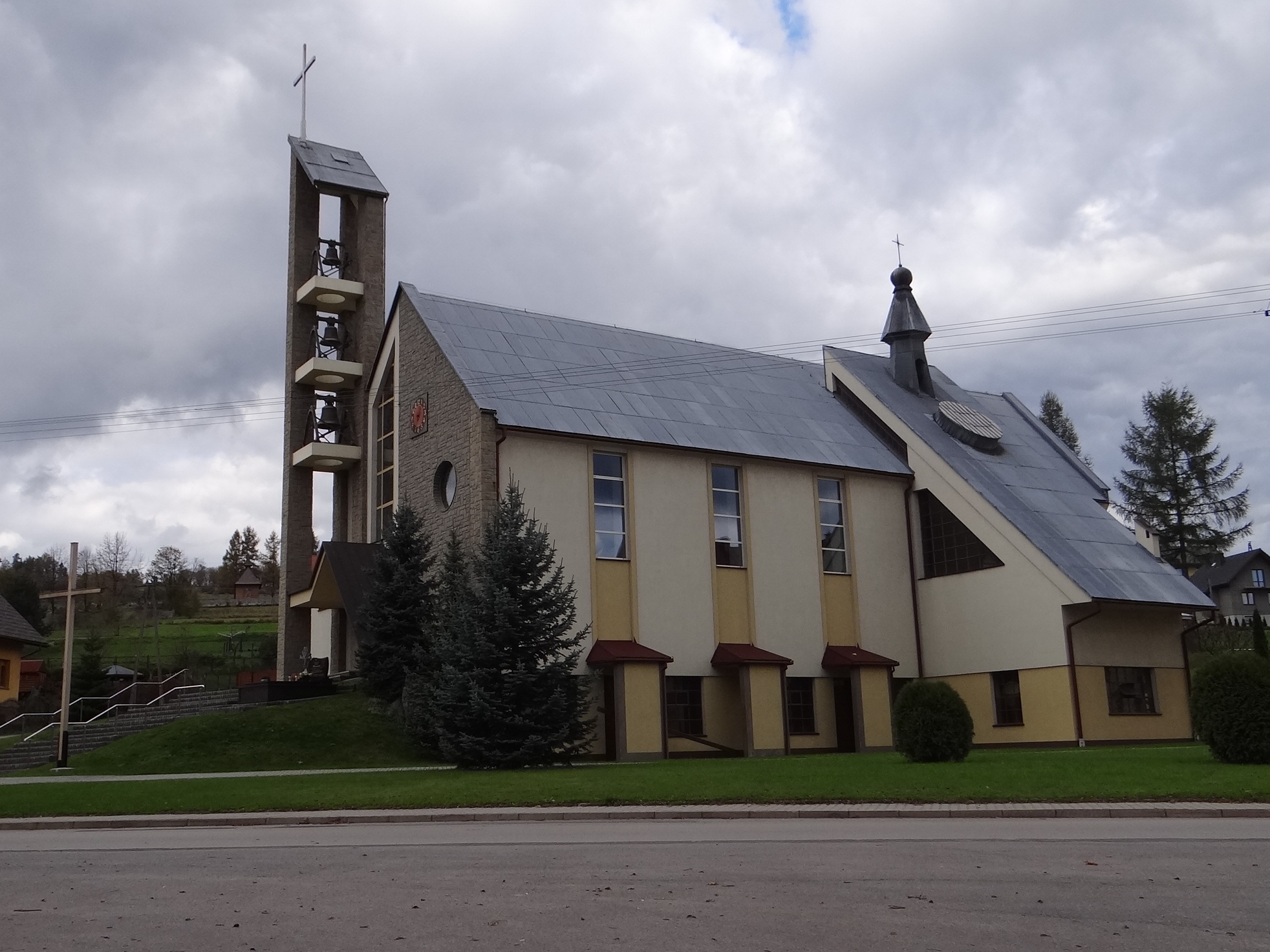
- Catholic church

- Location within Poland
- Coordinates: 49°37′39″N 19°48′42″E
- Country: Poland
- Voivodeship: Lesser Poland
- County: Sucha
- Gmina: Jordanów

Toporzysko [tɔpɔˈʐɨskɔ] is a village in the administrative district of Gmina Jordanów, within Sucha County, Lesser Poland Voivodeship, in southern Poland.
