= Grzechynia =

- Village
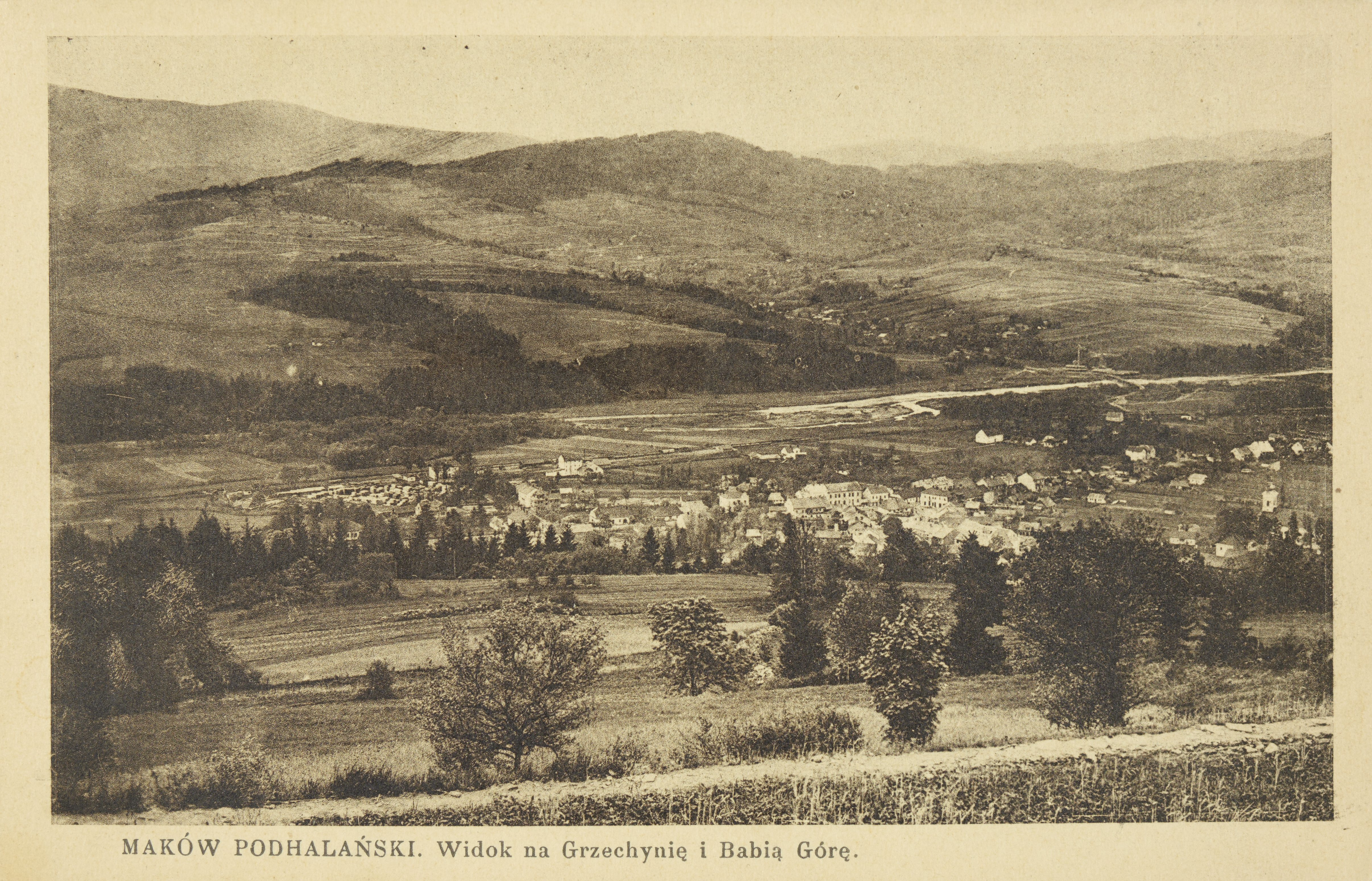
- Panoramic view of Grzechynia in the 1930s

- Location within Poland
- Coordinates: 49°43′1″N 19°39′36″E
- Country: Poland
- Voivodeship: Lesser Poland
- County: Sucha
- Gmina: Maków Podhalański
- Elevation: 872 m (2,861 ft)
- Population: 2,503

Grzechynia [ɡʐɛˈxɨɲa] is a village in the administrative district of Gmina Maków Podhalański, within Sucha County, Lesser Poland Voivodeship, in southern Poland.
