= Naprawa, Sucha County =

Naprawa
- Village
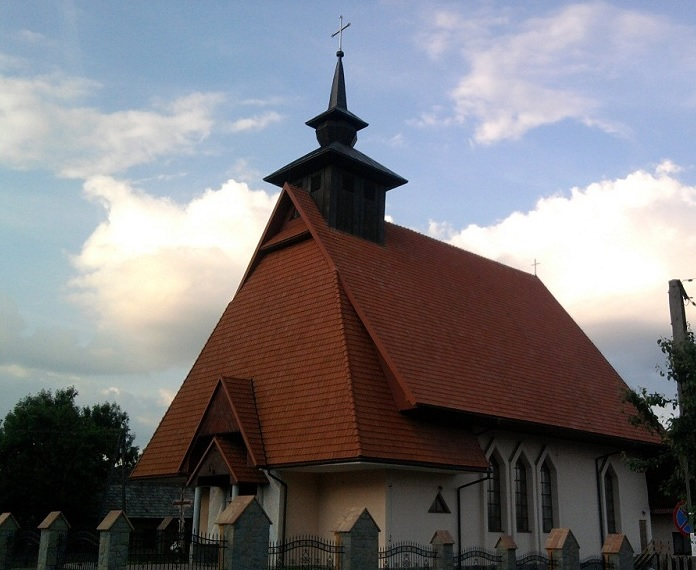
- Church in Naprawa

- Location within Poland
- Coordinates: 49°39′48″N 19°52′37″E
- Country: Poland
- Voivodeship: Lesser Poland
- County: Sucha
- Gmina: Jordanów
- Population (approx.): 2,100

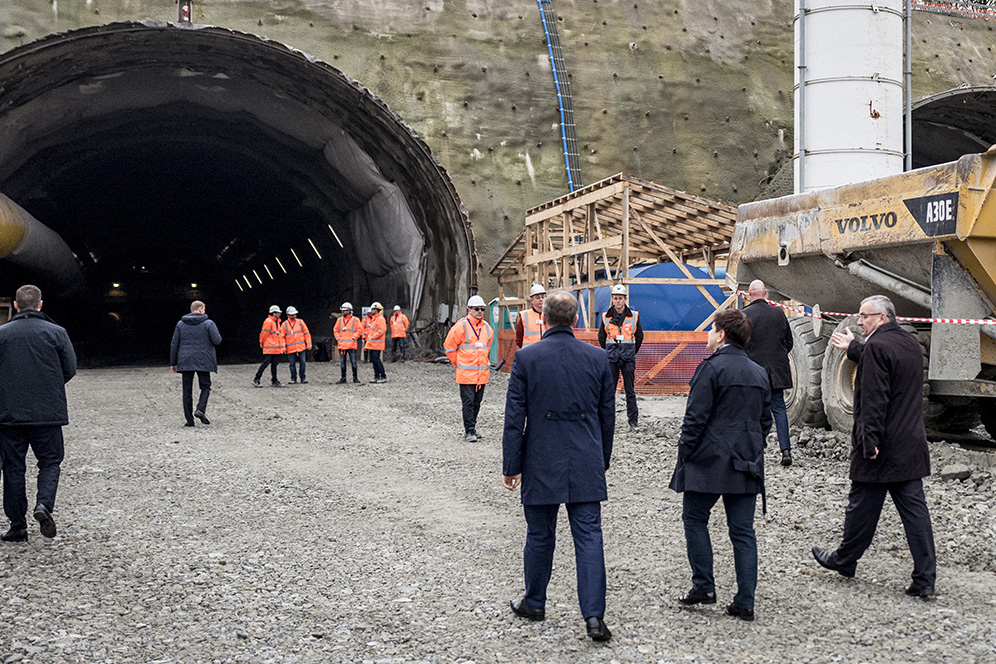

Naprawa [naˈprava] is a village in the administrative district of Gmina Jordanów, within Sucha County, Lesser Poland Voivodeship, in southern Poland.

The village has an approximate population of 2,100.
