= Żarnówka, Lesser Poland Voivodeship =

Żarnówka
- Village
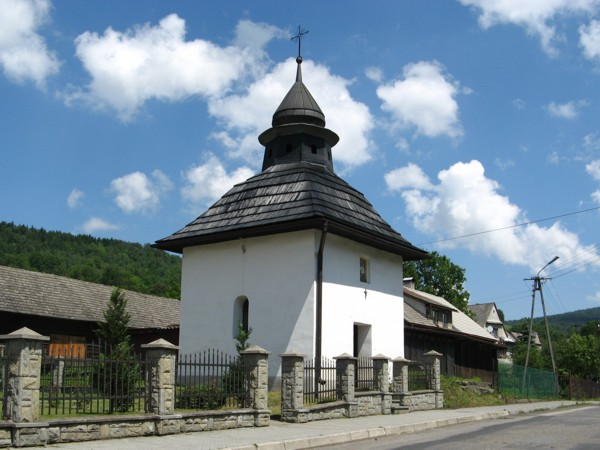
- Chapel

- Location within Poland
- Coordinates: 49°43′44″N 19°43′38″E
- Country: Poland
- Voivodeship: Lesser Poland
- County: Sucha
- Gmina: Maków Podhalański
- Population: 1,358

Żarnówka [ʐarˈnufka] is a village in the administrative district of Gmina Maków Podhalański, within Sucha County, Lesser Poland Voivodeship, in southern Poland.
