= Mariusz Wargocki =

Polish ski mountaineer (born 1970)

Personal information
- Born: 18 December 1970 (age 55) Zakopane, Poland

Sport
- Sport: Skiing
- Club: TKN Tatra Team

Mariusz Wargocki (born 18 December 1970) of the TKN Tatra Team is a Polish ski mountaineer.

Wargocki lives in his hometown Zakopane. He started ski mountaineering in 1999 and competed first in a race in Štrbské Pleso in 2005.

== Selected results ==
- 2005:
  - 1st, Polish Cup
- 2006:
  - 2nd, Polish Championship
  - 2nd, Polish Cup
- 2009:
  - 8th, European Championship relay race (together with Szymon Zachwieja, Jacek Żebracki and Andrzej Bargiel)
- 2010:
  - 10th ("ISMF men" ranking), Patrouille des Glaciers together with Jacek Żylka-Żebracki and Andrzej Bargiel
