= Osielec =

- Village
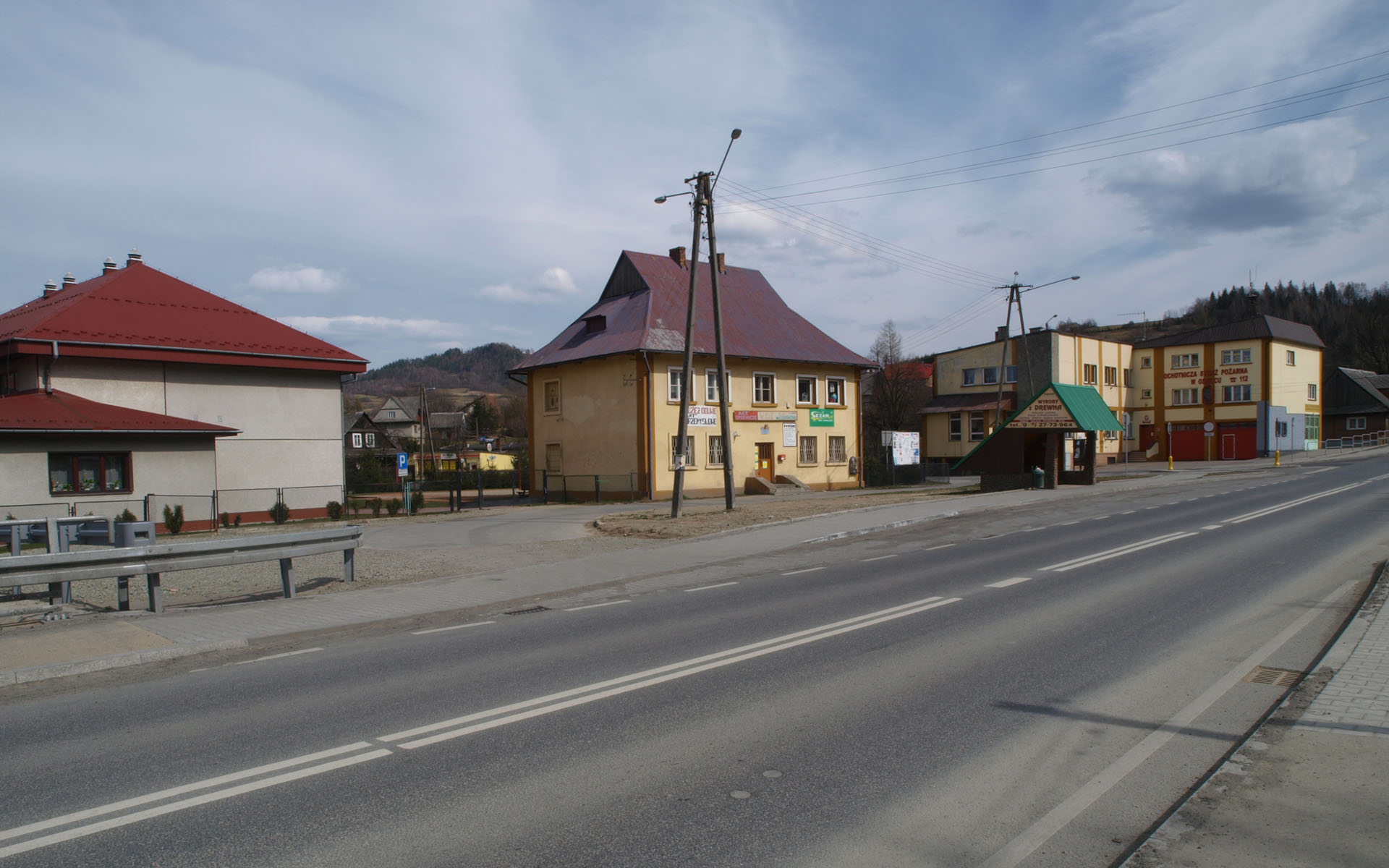

- Location within Poland
- Coordinates: 49°41′N 19°46′E
- Country: Poland
- Voivodeship: Lesser Poland
- County: Sucha
- Gmina: Jordanów
- Population: 3,000

Osielec [ɔˈɕɛlɛt͡s] is a village in the administrative district of Gmina Jordanów, within Sucha County, Lesser Poland Voivodeship, in southern Poland.
