= Wysoka, Sucha County =

Wysoka
- Village
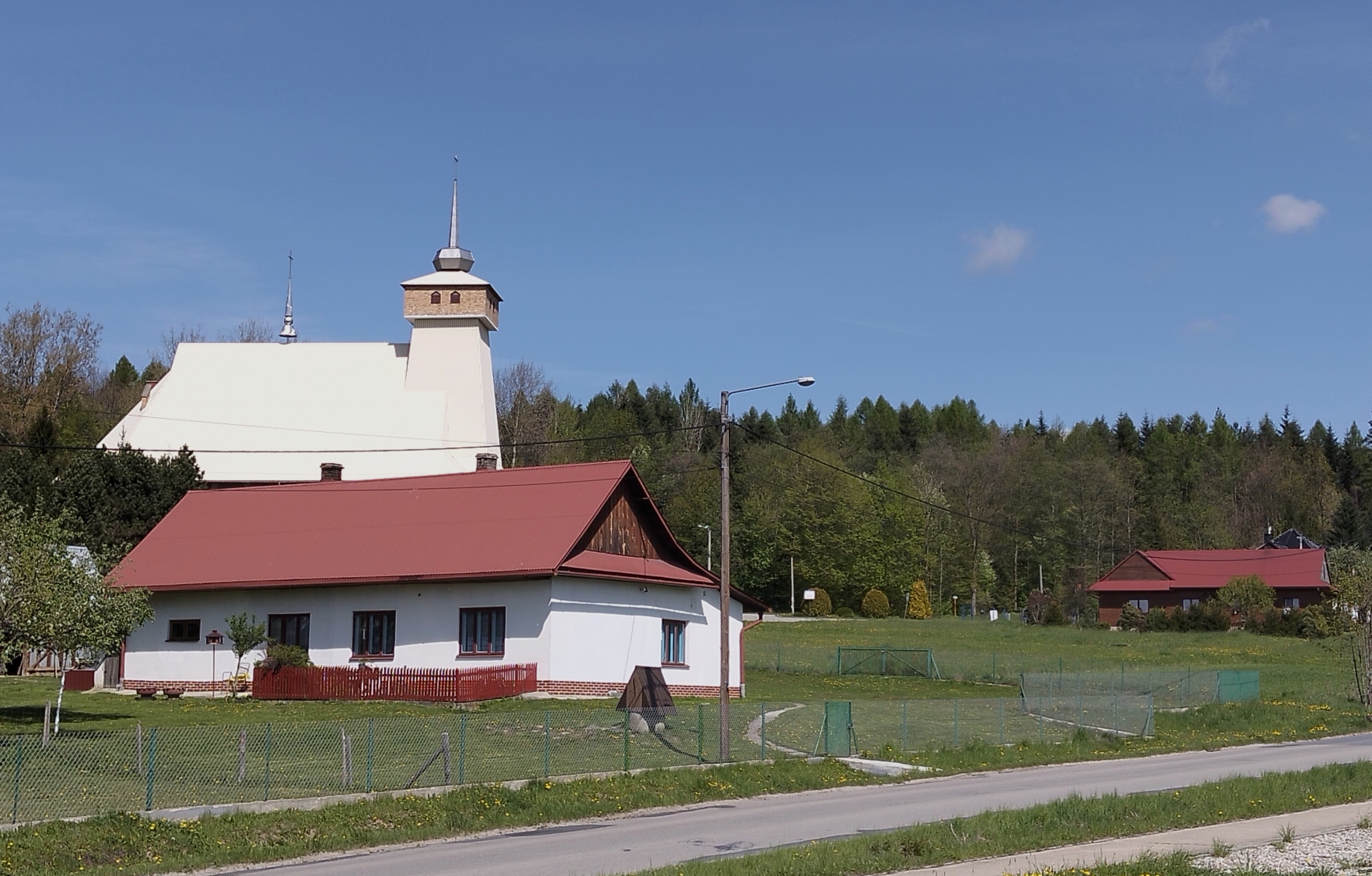

- Location within Poland
- Coordinates: 49°37′12″N 19°50′53″E
- Country: Poland
- Voivodeship: Lesser Poland
- County: Sucha
- Gmina: Jordanów
- Elevation: 525 m (1,722 ft)

Wysoka [vɨˈsɔka] is a village in the administrative district of Gmina Jordanów, within Sucha County, Lesser Poland Voivodeship, in southern Poland.
