= Kojszówka =

- Village
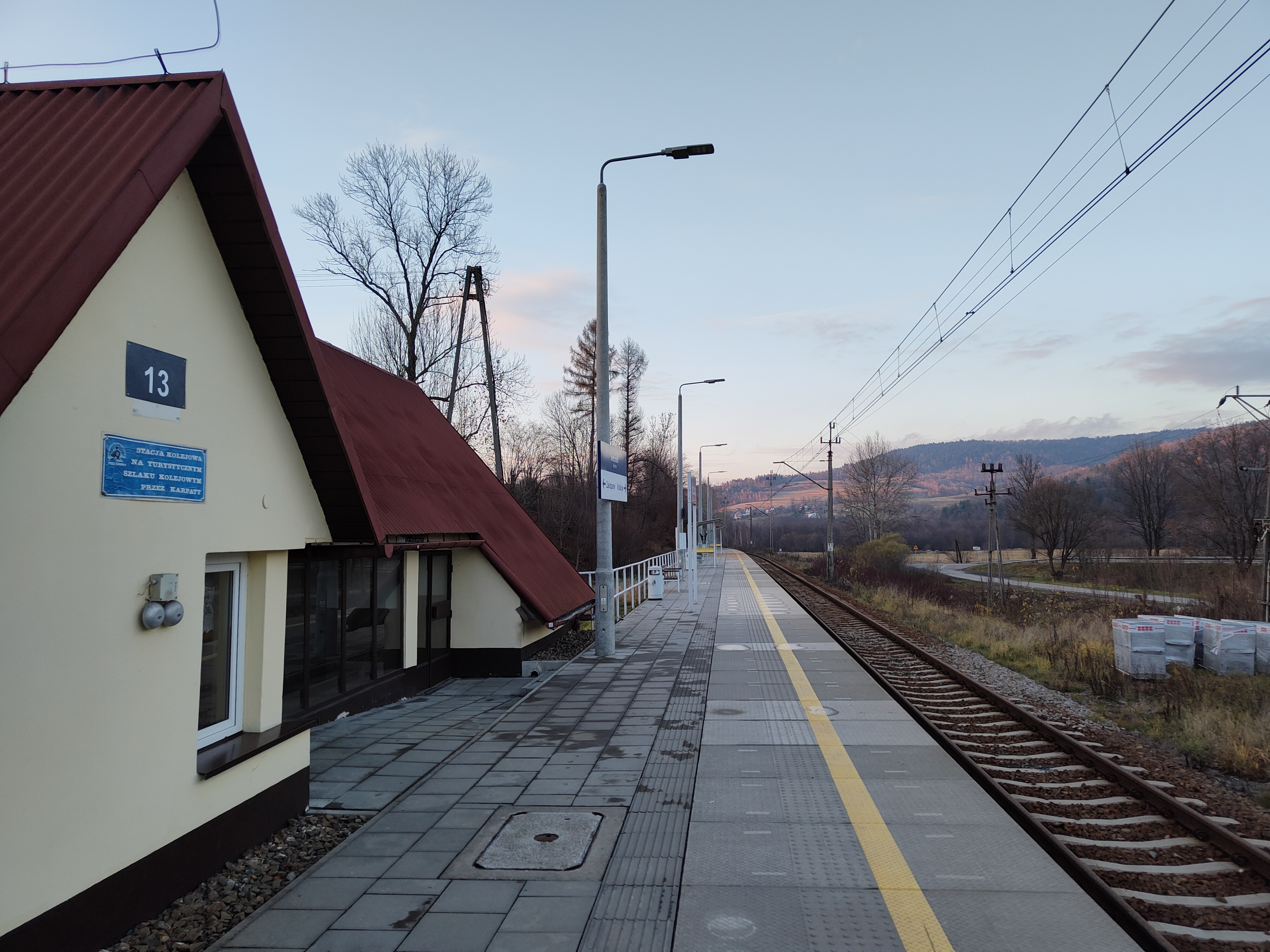
- Train stop

- Location within Poland
- Coordinates: 49°43′N 19°44′E
- Country: Poland
- Voivodeship: Lesser Poland
- County: Sucha
- Gmina: Maków Podhalański
- Population: 889

Kojszówka [kɔi̯ˈʂufka] is a village in the administrative district of Gmina Maków Podhalański, within Sucha County, Lesser Poland Voivodeship, in southern Poland.
