= Bystra Podhalańska =

- Village
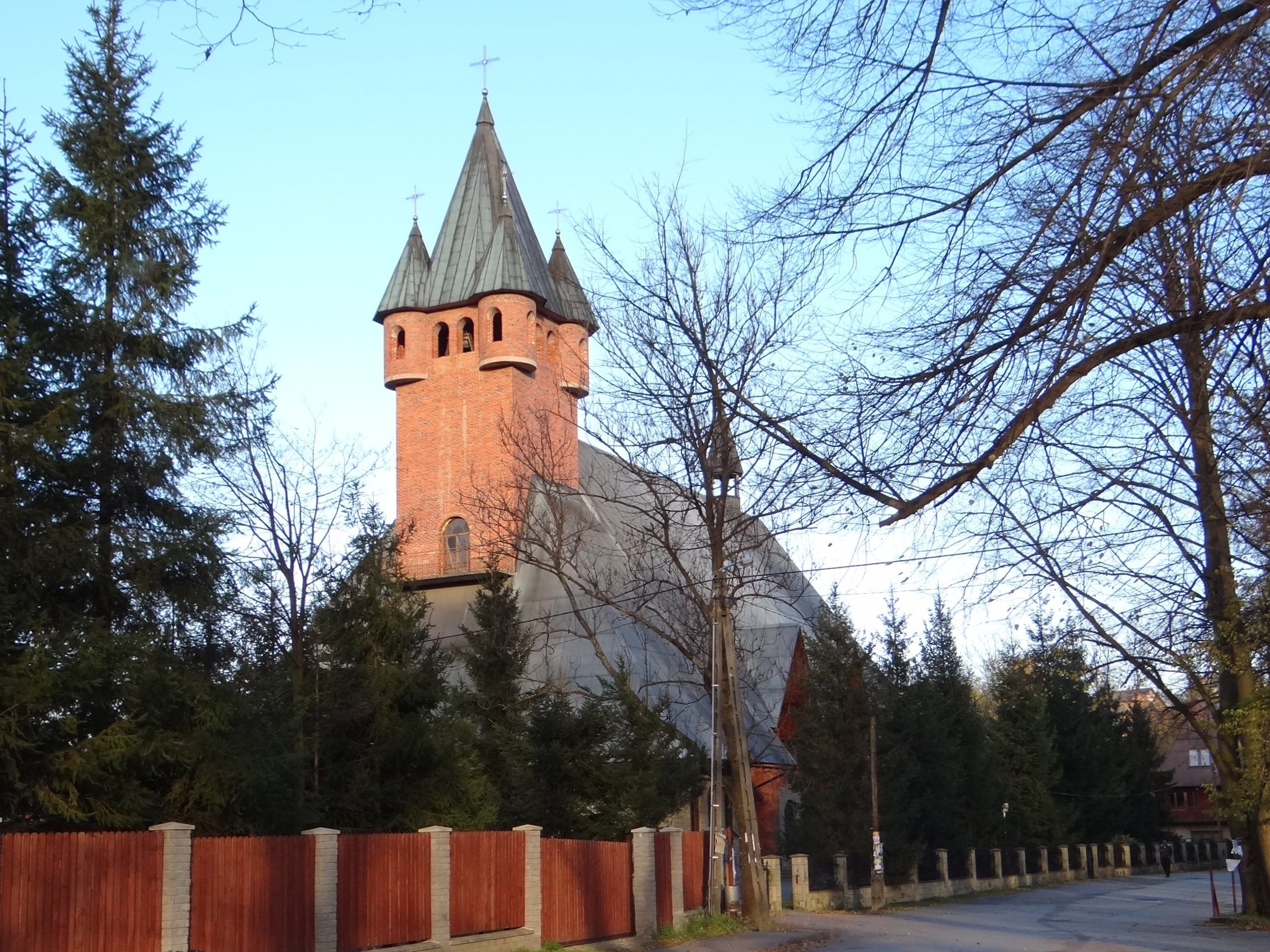
- Church of Saint Martin

- Location within Poland
- Coordinates: 49°38′N 19°46′E
- Country: Poland
- Voivodeship: Lesser Poland
- County: Sucha
- Gmina: Bystra-Sidzina

Population
  - Total: 2,900
- Website: http://bystra-sidzina.pl/

Bystra Podhalańska (until 2015 Bystra [ˈbɨstra]) is a village in Sucha County, Lesser Poland Voivodeship, in southern Poland. It is the seat of the gmina (administrative district) called Gmina Bystra-Sidzina.
