= Białka, Lesser Poland Voivodeship =

Białka
- Village
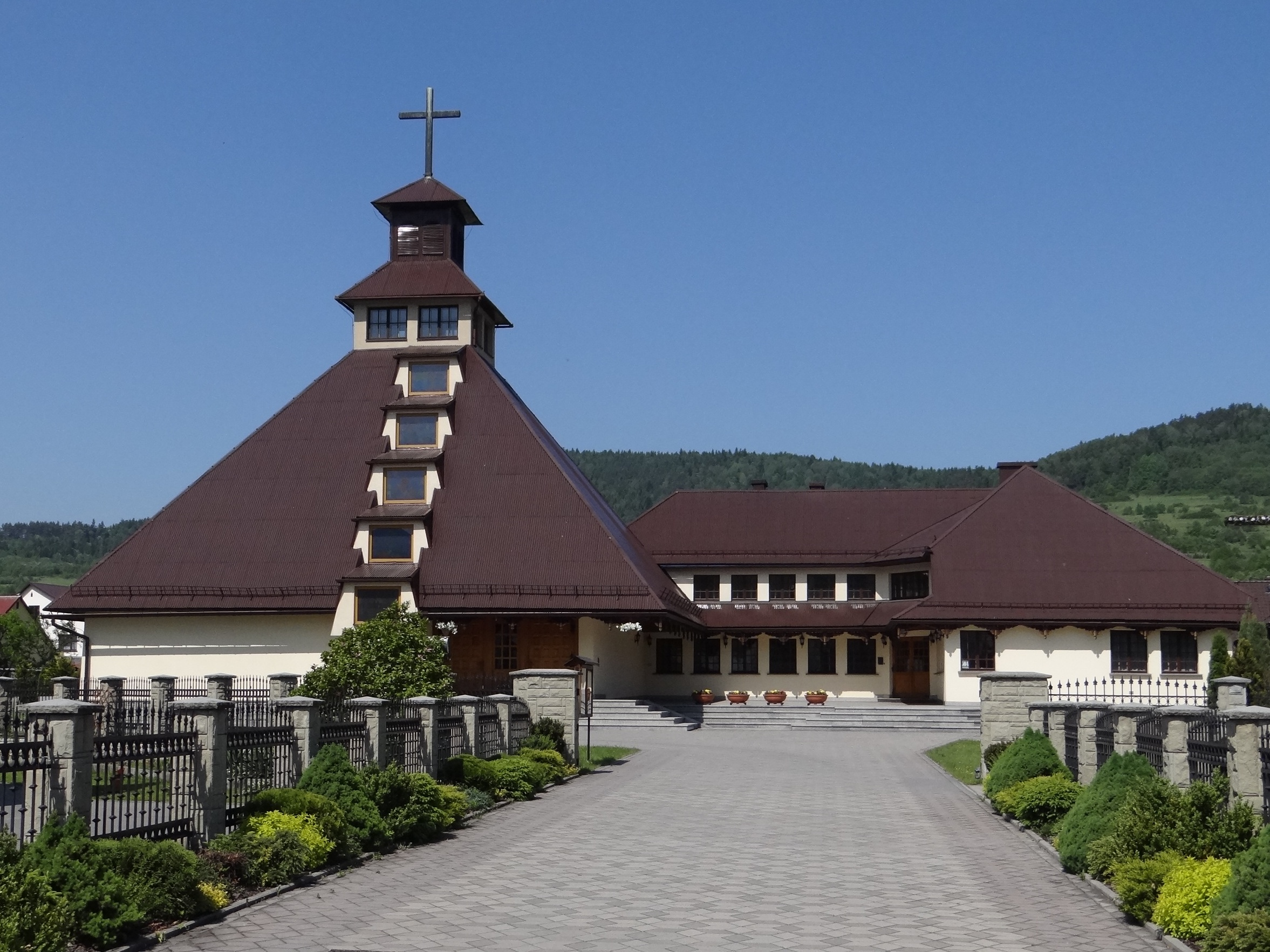
- A local Catholic church

- Location within Poland
- Coordinates: 49°41′30″N 19°40′10″E
- Country: Poland
- Voivodeship: Lesser Poland
- County: Sucha
- Gmina: Maków Podhalański
- Elevation: 410 m (1,350 ft)
- Population: 2,542
- Website: http://wiesbialka.pl.tl

Białka [ˈbjau̯ka] is a village in the administrative district of Gmina Maków Podhalański, within Sucha County, Lesser Poland Voivodeship, in southern Poland.
