= Gmina Jordanów =

Gmina Jordanów Jordanów Commune
- Gmina
- Coat of arms
- Interactive map of Gmina Jordanów
- Coordinates (Jordanów): 49°40′N 19°50′E
- Country: Poland
- Voivodeship: Lesser Poland
- County: Sucha
- Seat: Jordanów

Area
  - Total: 92.65 km^{2} (35.77 sq mi)

Population (2006)
  - Total: 10,508
  - Density: 113.4/km^{2} (293.7/sq mi)
- Website: http://www.gmina-jordanow.pl/

Gmina Jordanów is a rural gmina (administrative district) in Sucha County, Lesser Poland Voivodeship, in southern Poland. Its seat is the town of Jordanów, although the town is not part of the territory of the gmina.

The gmina covers an area of 92.65 square kilometres (35.8 sq mi), and as of 2006 its total population is 10,508.

== Villages ==
Gmina Jordanów contains the villages and settlements of Łętownia, Naprawa, Osielec, Toporzysko and Wysoka.

== Neighbouring gminas ==
Gmina Jordanów is bordered by the town of Jordanów and by the gminas of Bystra-Sidzina, Lubień, Maków Podhalański, Raba Wyżna, Spytkowice and Tokarnia.
