= Gmina Bystra-Sidzina =

Gmina Bystra-Sidzina Bystra-Sidzina Commune
- Gmina
- Coat of arms
- Interactive map of Gmina Bystra-Sidzina
- Coordinates (Bystra): 49°38′N 19°46′E
- Country: Poland
- Voivodeship: Lesser Poland
- County: Sucha
- Seat: Bystra

Area
  - Total: 80.43 km^{2} (31.05 sq mi)

Population (2006)
  - Total: 6,423
  - Density: 79.86/km^{2} (206.8/sq mi)
- Website: http://www.bystra-sidzina.pl/

Gmina Bystra-Sidzina is a rural gmina (administrative district) in Sucha County, Lesser Poland Voivodeship, in southern Poland. Its seat is the village of Bystra; it also contains the village of Sidzina.

The gmina covers an area of 80.43 square kilometres (31.1 sq mi), and as of 2006 its total population is 6,423.

== Neighbouring gminas ==
Gmina Bystra-Sidzina is bordered by the town of Jordanów and by the gminas of Jabłonka, Jordanów, Maków Podhalański, Spytkowice and Zawoja.
