= Łętownia, Lesser Poland Voivodeship =

Łętownia
- Village
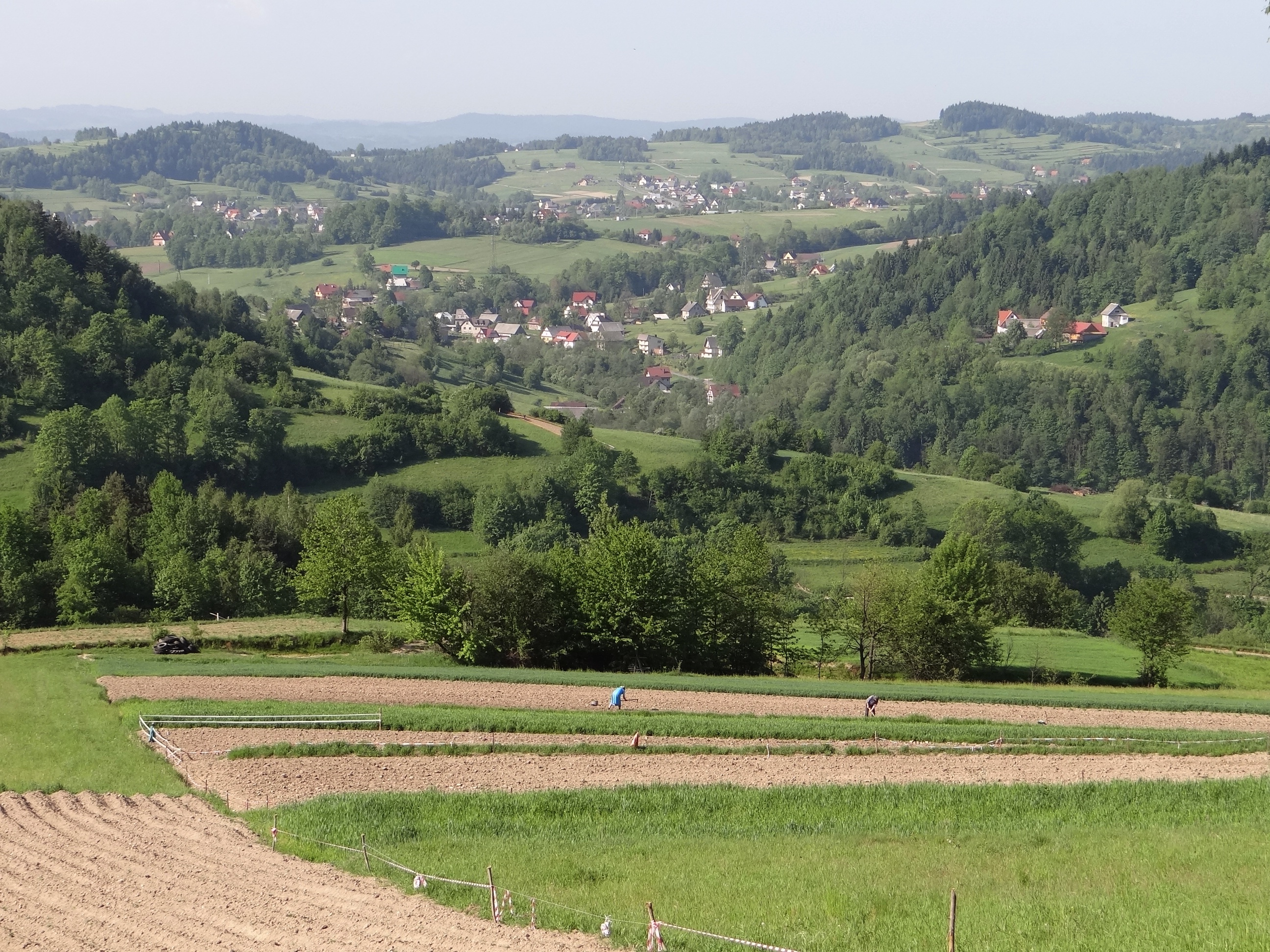
- Łętownia

- Location within Poland
- Coordinates: 49°49′51″N 19°52′13″E
- Country: Poland
- Voivodeship: Lesser Poland
- County: Sucha
- Gmina: Jordanów
- Highest elevation: 858 m (2,815 ft)
- Lowest elevation: 450 m (1,480 ft)
- Population: 2,800

Łętownia [wɛnˈtɔvɲa] is a village in the administrative district of Gmina Jordanów, within Sucha County, Lesser Poland Voivodeship, in southern Poland.
