= Juszczyn, Lesser Poland Voivodeship =

Juszczyn
- Village
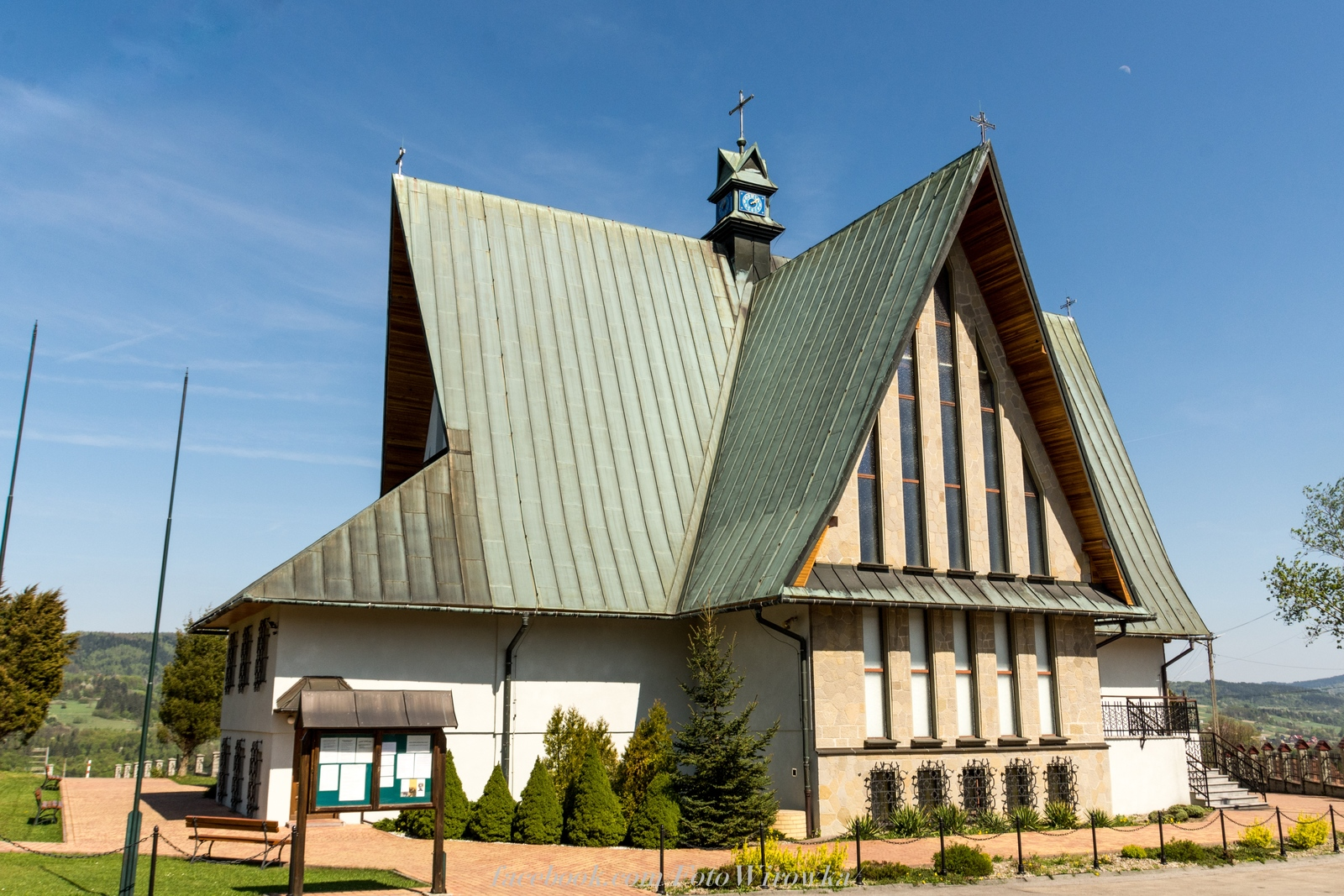
- Catholic church

- Location within Poland
- Coordinates: 49°41′40″N 19°41′40″E
- Country: Poland
- Voivodeship: Lesser Poland
- County: Sucha
- Gmina: Maków Podhalański
- Population: 2,511

Juszczyn [ˈjuʂt͡ʂɨn] is a village in the administrative district of Gmina Maków Podhalański, within Sucha County, Lesser Poland Voivodeship, in southern Poland.
