= Elisabetta Vendramini =

Italian Franciscan tertiary (1790-1860)

Blessed Elisabetta Vendramini TOSF
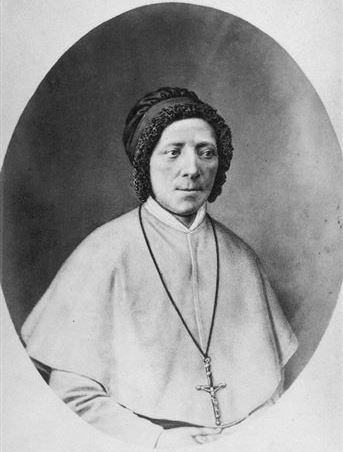
- Born: 9 April 1790; Bassano del Grappa, Vicenza, Republic of Venice
- Died: 2 April 1860 (aged 69); Padua, Kingdom of Lombardy–Venetia
- Venerated in: Roman Catholic Church
- Beatified: 4 November 1990, Saint Peter's Square, Vatican City by Pope John Paul II
- Feast: 2 April

Elisabetta Vendramini (9 April 1790 – 2 April 1860) was an Italian Franciscan tertiary who established the Elizabethan Sisters in 1830 in Padua. Her beatification was celebrated on 4 November 1990.

== Life ==
Elisabetta Vendramini was born on 9 April 1790 in Vicenza. She was educated in an Augustinian convent as a child and received her religious upbringing from both them and from her parents.

In 1811 she became engaged – despite parental objection – to a man of humble origins from Ferrara. She broke off this engagement on the night before her wedding in 1817 because she felt a clear and concise call to the religious life so that she could devote herself to the needs of the poor. She began to take care of children in her hometown and later joined the staff of a Capuchin orphanage in 1820. In 1821 she became professed into the Third Order of Saint Francis. Vendramini relocated to Padua and worked with two of her friends at a tuition-free school.

On 10 November 1828 she established the Franciscan Elizabethan Sisters in Padua – with the aid of the priest Luigi Maran (1794–1859) and named it in honor of Saint Elizabeth of Hungary. The institute was set to follow the rule of Francis of Assisi – the rule that Pope Nicholas IV approved in 1289. Her congregation distinguished itself in 1836 during an epidemic of fever.

She died on 2 April 1860. Her remains disappeared in 1872 after graves where she was located underwent a renovation.

Her congregation was aggregated to the Order of Friars Minor on 19 February 1904 while Pope Pius X issued the decree of praise on 5 April 1910. It received full approval from Pope Pius XI on 18 June 1934. The order now operates in Kenya, Ecuador, Argentina, Egypt, Israel and in South Sudan amongst other states and as of 2005 has 117 houses with a total of 1032 sisters.

== Beatification ==
The beatification process commenced in the Diocese of Padua on 30 December 1938 and concluded its preliminary investigation on 18 April 1947. The formal cause for Vendramini was opened in Rome on 14 May 1947, granting her the title of Servant of God. Theologians collected her writings and approved them as being in line with the faith in a decree of 2 April 1964. The second process opened on 8 June 1963 to continue the work of the first process and closed on 30 November 1964. The final one opened on 12 January 1965 and closed sometime later.

The Positio was submitted to the Congregation for the Causes of Saints in 1986 and was sent to a session of historians in order for the latter group to assess whether or not the cause had historical obstacles that would prevent it from proceeding. The team of historians approved the cause on 10 March 1987. On 11 March 1988 the C.C.S. validated the previous three processes and assigned theologians to discuss the cause to which the latter voiced approval to the contents of the Positio on 28 June 1988. The C.C.S. themselves also approved it on 7 February 1989 which would allow them to pass on their findings to the pope for his own approval.

She was proclaimed to be Venerable – on 18 February 1989 – after Pope John Paul II approved the fact that the late religious had lived a model Christian life of heroic virtue in which she was said to have exemplified the cardinal virtues and the theological virtues.

The miracle required for her beatification was investigated in the Italian diocese of its origin from May 1956 until July 1956. The miracle in question involved the perfect and rapid cure of Sergia De Carlo – from Vendramini's own order – in December 1936 in Padua who was suffering from a combination of tuberculosis and Pott's Disease. It received the validation of the C.C.S. on 21 April 1989 and received the approval of the medical board on 15 November 1989. The consulting theologians also voiced their approval to the miracle on 23 March 1990 while the C.C.S. also voiced approval on 19 June 1990. The pope voiced his approval on 10 July 1990 and beatified her on 4 November 1990. The postulator assigned to the cause is Giovangiuseppe Califano.
