= Gmina Maków Podhalański =

Gmina Maków Podhalański Maków Podhalański Commune
- Gmina
- Flag Coat of arms
- Interactive map of Gmina Maków Podhalański
- Coordinates (Maków Podhalański): 49°43′50″N 19°40′51″E
- Country: Poland
- Voivodeship: Lesser Poland
- County: Sucha
- Seat: Maków Podhalański

Area
  - Total: 108.94 km^{2} (42.06 sq mi)

Population (2006)
  - Total: 15,873
  - Density: 145.70/km^{2} (377.37/sq mi)
  - Urban: 5,738
  - Rural: 10,135
- Website: http://www.makow-podhalanski.pl/

Gmina Maków Podhalański is an urban-rural gmina (administrative district) in Sucha County, Lesser Poland Voivodeship, in southern Poland. Its seat is the town of Maków Podhalański, which lies approximately 7 kilometres (4 mi) east of Sucha Beskidzka and 42 km (26 mi) south-west of the regional capital Kraków.

The gmina covers an area of 108.94 square kilometres (42.1 sq mi), and as of 2006 its total population is 15,873 (out of which the population of Maków Podhalański amounts to 5,738, and the population of the rural part of the gmina is 10,135).

== Villages ==
Apart from the town of Maków Podhalański, Gmina Maków Podhalański contains the villages and settlements of Białka, Grzechynia, Juszczyn, Kojszówka, Wieprzec and Żarnówka.

== Neighbouring gminas ==
Gmina Maków Podhalański is bordered by the town of Sucha Beskidzka and by the gminas of Budzów, Bystra-Sidzina, Jordanów, Stryszawa, Tokarnia, Zawoja and Zembrzyce.
