= Skawica, Lesser Poland Voivodeship =

Skawica
- Village
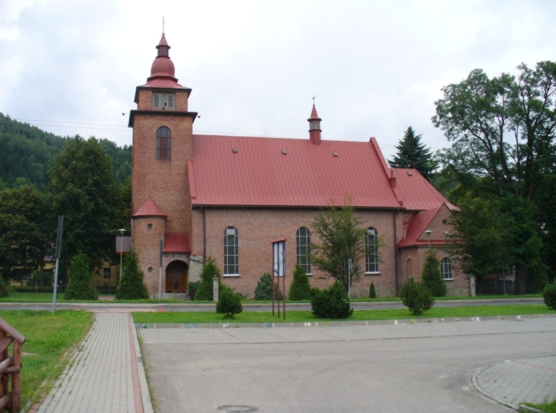
- Our Lady of Częstochowa Church

- Location within Poland
- Coordinates: 49°40′41″N 19°37′40″E
- Country: Poland
- Voivodeship: Lesser Poland
- County: Sucha
- Gmina: Zawoja
- Population: 2,600

Skawica [skaˈvit͡sa] is a village in the administrative district of Gmina Zawoja, within Sucha County, Lesser Poland Voivodeship, in southern Poland, close to the border with Slovakia.
