= Walter Wolf (politician) =

German politician

Walter Wolf (27 February 1907 in Gotha – 2 April 1977 in Potsdam) was a German politician and member of the Communist Party of Germany (KPD).

Wolf was the culture minister of Thuringia from 1945 until 1947.
