= Polica (mountain) =

Mountain in Poland

Coordinates: 49°38′N 19°38′E

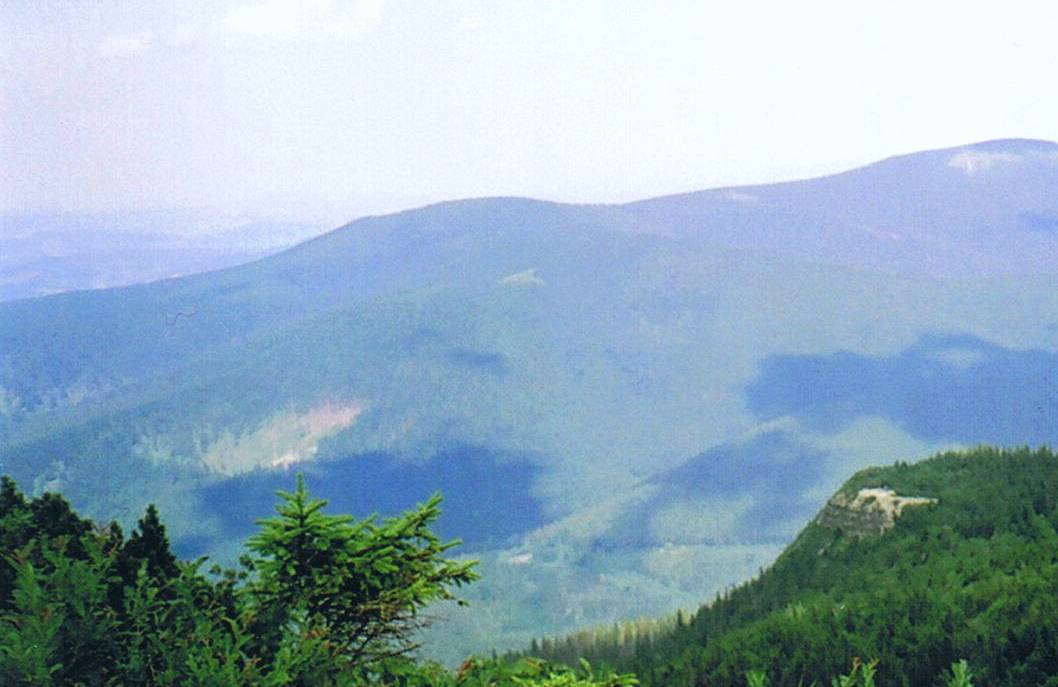
Polica (background, right)

Polica, locally known as Police, is a mountain, 1,369 m (4,491 ft), in southern Poland near Zawoja, in the Żywiec Beskids mountain range.

LOT Polish Airlines Flight 165 crashed on the northern slope of Police on 2 April 1969. The accident spot is marked by a cross, erected in the 1990s.

Until 1918, Polica was on the border between Galicia and Hungary, and between 1918 and 1920 on the Polish-Czechoslovak border.
