= LOT Polish Airlines Flight 165 (1969) =

1969 aviation accident

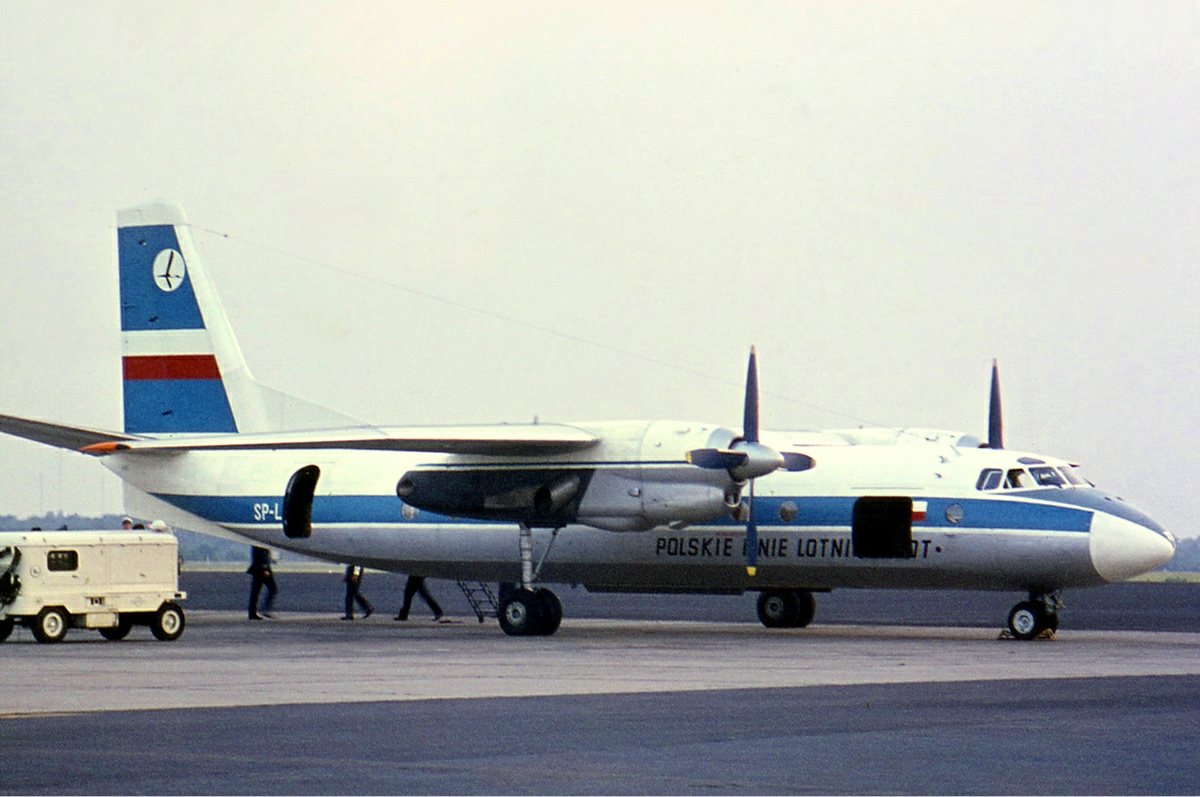
- A LOT Antonov An-24, similar to the crashed aircraft

Accident
- Date: 2 April 1969
- Summary: Bad weather and CFIT
- Site: Near Zawoja, Poland; 49°38′0″N 19°38′0″E

Aircraft
- Aircraft type: Antonov An-24W
- Operator: LOT Polish Airlines
- IATA flight No.: LO165
- ICAO flight No.: LOT165
- Call sign: LOT 165
- Registration: SP-LTF
- Flight origin: Warsaw Chopin Airport, Warsaw, Poland
- Destination: Krakow Balice airport, Balice, Poland
- Occupants: 53
- Passengers: 47
- Crew: 6
- Fatalities: 53
- Survivors: 0

LOT Polish Airlines Flight 165 was an Antonov An-24 aircraft, registration SP-LTF, operating a scheduled passenger flight from Warsaw to Krakow Balice airport. It crashed into a mountain on 2 April 1969 at 16:08 local time (UTC+1) during a snowstorm. All 53 people on board were killed.

== Flight history ==
=== Introduction ===
Much of the known information about the accident comes from two newspaper articles published in 1994. Their author wrote that, even 25 years after the accident, most documentation on the crash remained classified. Reports were based on the accounts of participants in the rescue action and some members of the accident investigation commission who asked for anonymity.

=== Flight ===
The aircraft took off at 15:20 local time for a 55-minute flight to Krakow's Balice Airport. The captain was Czesław Doliński.

At 15:49, the first officer received instructions to descend to 1,500 metres (4,900 ft) and get in touch with Balice control tower after passing Jędrzejów, less than 80 km north of Krakow. A military radar registered the aircraft at that time at 4,000 metres (13,000 ft) altitude. The pilots informed controllers in Okęcie and Balice when the plane had passed Jędrzejów VOR, but caused confusion by providing three different passage times a few minutes apart. Shortly thereafter and before 16:00, the captain (who by then had taken over control) called Balice, gave his altitude as 3,700 metres (12,100 ft), received the local weather report, and then was instructed to descend to 1,200 metres (3,900 ft).

At 16:01, the aircraft was recorded at 2,400 metres (7,900 ft) and descending. In the next eight minutes, a series of radio exchanges took place between the aircraft and the Balice radar operator, with the captain repeatedly asking for his fix and reporting problems with the beacon signal, and the operator asking for the aircraft's position and altitude to help him find the aircraft on the radar screen. At 16:05, the aircraft was noted near Maków Podhalański, some 50 km past Krakow, at a height of 1,200 metres (3,900 ft). The last transmission received from the airplane was, "Left turn to further...-" at 16:08.17. Seconds after that, radio contact was lost. The plane subsequently crashed on the northern slope of Polica mountain, near Zawoja, southern Poland, at an altitude of 1,200 metres (3,900 ft).

== Controversy ==
The official death toll of 53 remains controversial. The LOT manifest included 53 passengers and 5 crew members, but two days after the crash Polish press agencies published (based on LOT's information) 46 surnames (part of them without an address or name). Among the passengers were 49 Poles, 3 Americans, and a Briton.

The official accident report, published in 1970, blamed the accident on the captain becoming lost. No reasons were given as to why the aircraft, just before the crash, was flying at low altitude some 50 kilometres (31 mi) past its intended destination.

After the accident, the code 165 was still used by the airline. In 1978, the flight was hijacked by two women who were seeking political asylum in West Germany.

== See also ==
- List of Poland disasters by death toll
- LOT Polish Airlines Flight 007
- LOT Polish Airlines Flight 5055
- LOT Polish Airlines Flight 703
