= Maków Podhalański =

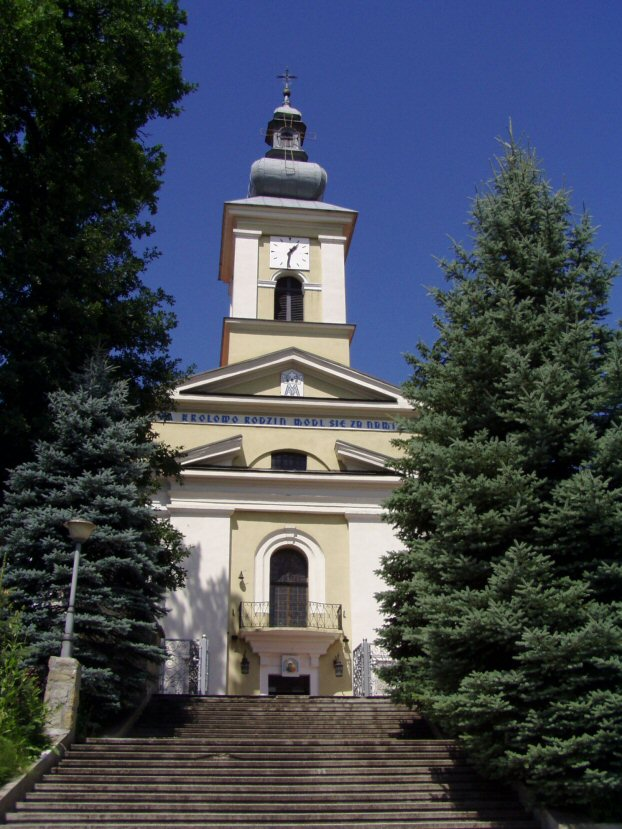
- Church of the Transfiguration of Christ

- Flag Coat of arms

- Location within Poland
- Coordinates: 49°43′50″N 19°40′51″E
- Country: Poland
- Voivodeship: Lesser Poland
- County: Sucha
- Gmina: Maków Podhalański

Government
  - Mayor: Michał Surmiak

Area
  - Total: 20.04 km^{2} (7.74 sq mi)
- Elevation: 455 m (1,493 ft)

Population (2006)
  - Total: 5,738
  - Density: 286.3/km^{2} (741.6/sq mi)
- Time zone: UTC+1 (CET)
  - Summer (DST): UTC+2 (CEST)
- Postal code: 34-220
- Car plates: KSU

Maków Podhalański [ˈmakuf pɔtxaˈlaɲskʲi] (known as Maków until 1930) is a town in southern Poland, on the Skawa river. Population: 5,738 (2006).

Since 1999 situated in Sucha County, Lesser Poland Voivodeship. Previously (1975–1998) in Bielsko-Biala Voivodeship.
