= Adam Gorczyński =

Polish writer, poet, painter, social activist, and owner of estates

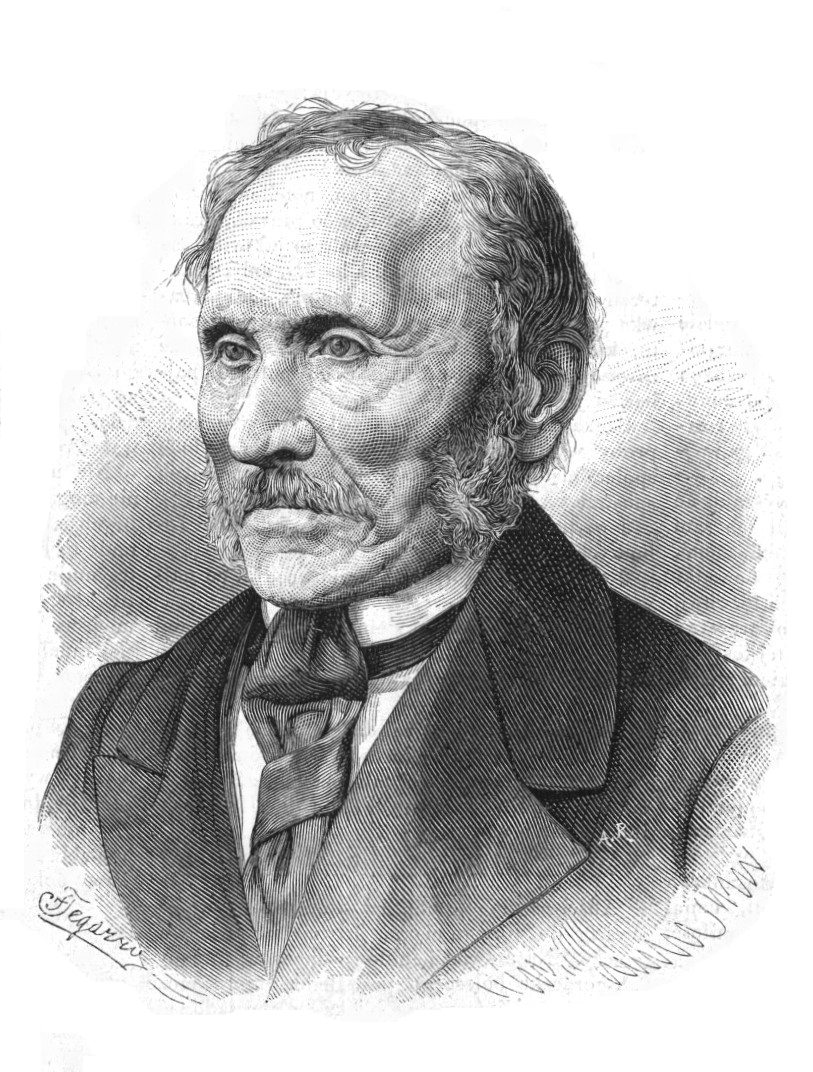
- Adam Gorczyński according to a woodcut from 1876
- Born: 1805; Tarnów
- Died: 24 May 1976; Brzeźnica
- Known for: Novels, poetry, opinion journalism, paintings, drawings
- Movement: Polish Romanticism

Signature
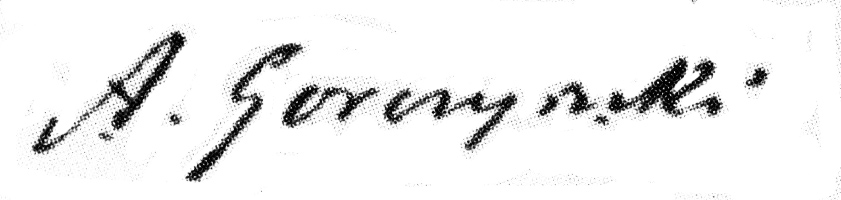

Adam Gorczyński (Polish: [ɡɔrˈt͡ʂɨɲski]; 1805 – 24 May 1876) was a Polish writer and poet of the Romantic era, author of popular novels in the style of gawęda szlachecka and Old Polish silvae rerum, a painter of the Polish Romantic era, an artist of Polish landscapes, co-founder of the Kraków Society of Friends of Fine Arts, politically engaged in Polish affairs in Galicia, a social activist, and owner of estates in Brzeźnica and Marcyporęba. He used the literary pseudonym "Jadam of Zator". In the 21st century, he became the patron of cultural initiatives in his hometown of Brzeźnica.

== Early life ==
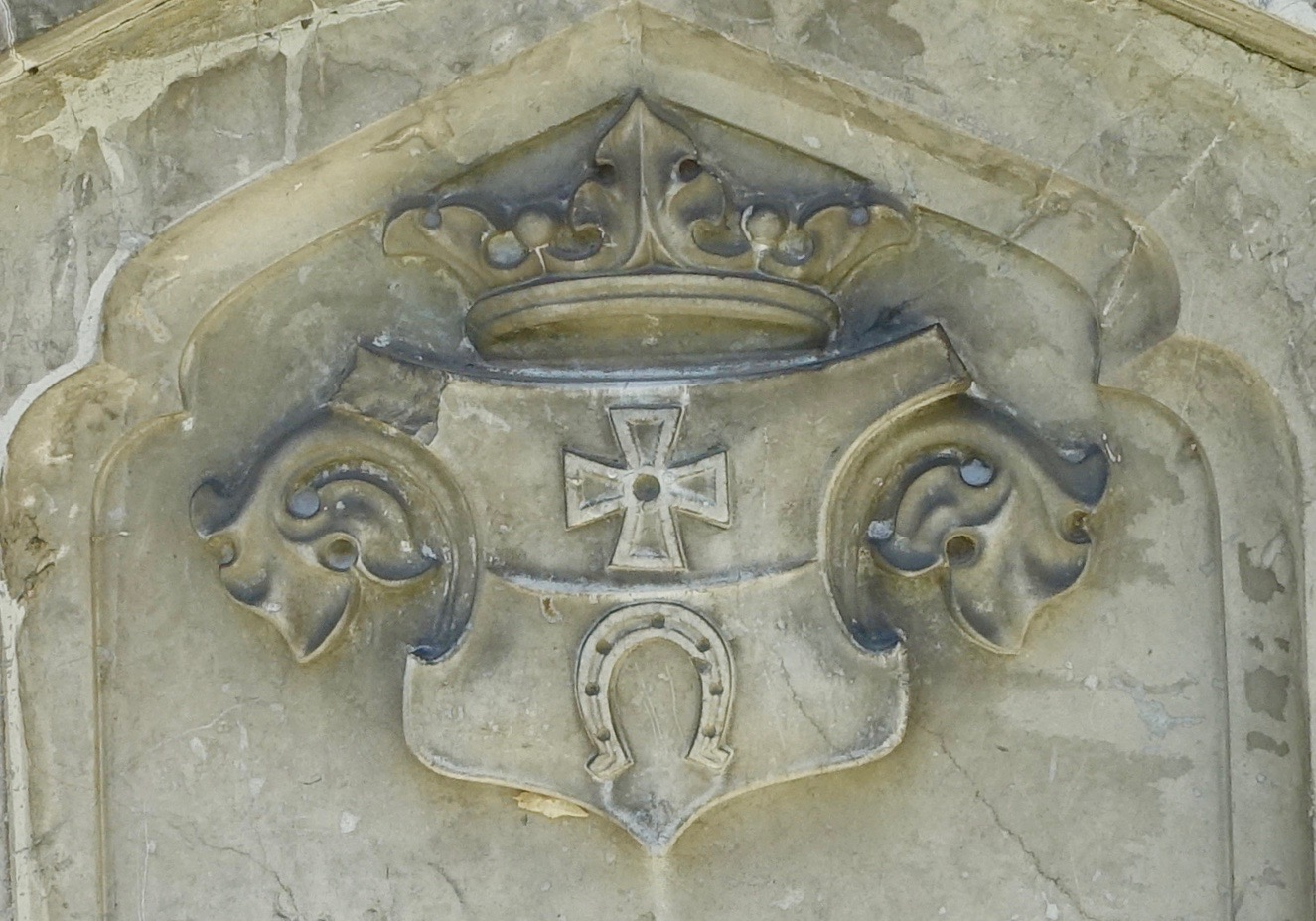
Coat of arms of the Gorczyński family (Note: Based on the Jastrzębiec coat of arms.) from the statue of Józef Kalasanty, Adam's father, in front of St. Martin's Church in Marcyporęba, 2018

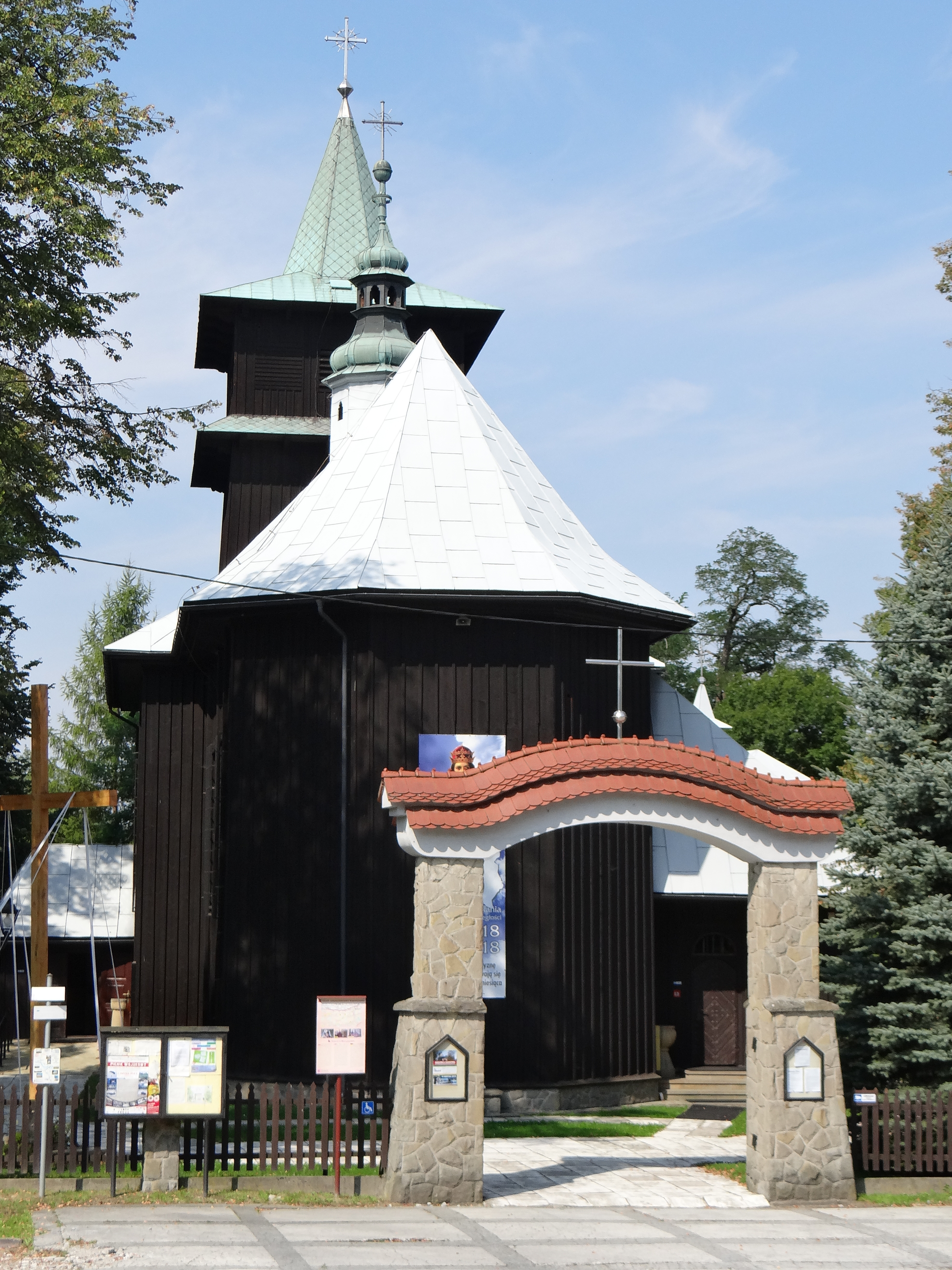
St. Martin's Church in Marcyporęba, 2018

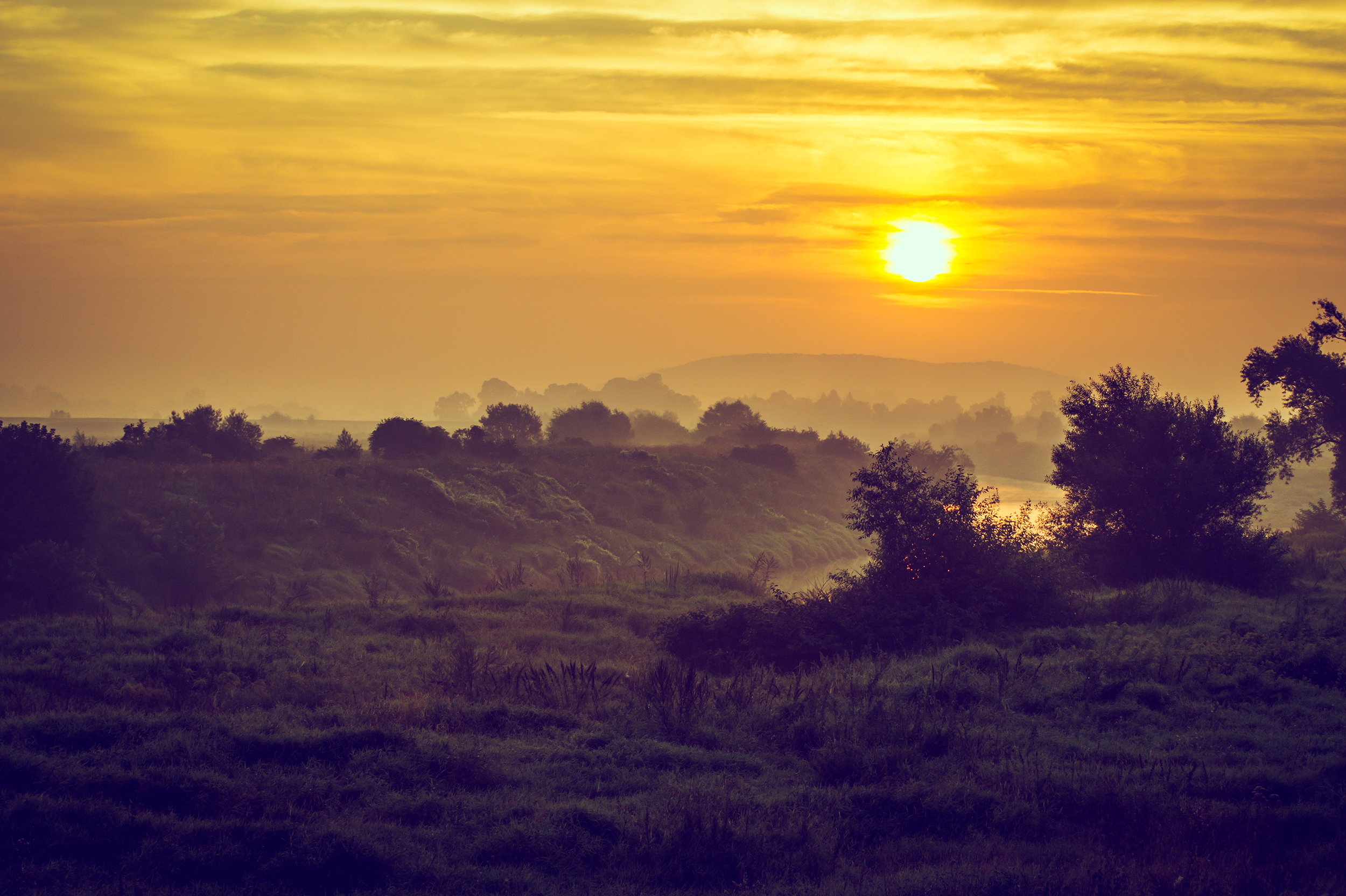
View of the Vistula river north of Brzeźnica, 2016

He was born in 1805 in Tarnów as the son of the ennobled lawyer Józef Kalasanty Gorczyński (of his own coat of arms) and Katarzyna Łojowska. In 1818, Józef Kalasanty purchased Brzeźnica, Nowe Dwory, and part of Marcyporęba. Adam's sister Elżbieta was the grandmother of General Józef Haller.

Adam Gorczyński completed his gymnasium education in Tarnów and then studied philosophy in Lviv. During this time, he established contacts with Ossolineum and became close to a group of Lviv intellectuals – August Bielowski, Ludwik Nabielak, and Stanisław Jaszowski – who were advocates of emphasizing the connections between Polish culture and the history of Slavdom. The cultural and literary atmosphere that the young Gorczyński absorbed during this time was reflected in his later literary works.

From 1821, he pursued "chamber studies" in Vienna, which prepared estate managers for large landownership and officials for the Austrian crown lands. Upon his return from Vienna, where he also studied painting, he married and took over the management of the estate in Nowe Dwory. After his father's death in 1830, he permanently moved to Brzeźnica, which he inherited together with part of the nearby Marcyporęba. As a significant landowner in Galicia, he had the right to vote in the estate owners' curia. He died in 1876 and was buried in the cemetery next to the parish church in Marcyporęba.

=== Literary work ===
Adam Gorczyński was a creator of the Polish Romantic era, associated with emigrant literature and Slavophilia, whose development coincided with the period from 1815 (the confirmation of the partitions of Poland by the Congress of Vienna) to 1863 (the fall of the January Uprising). During this time, the paths of European Romanticism were shaped by social changes, and Polish political events defined its distinct national-patriotic character. These characteristics appeared in Polish art until the regaining of independence in 1918, and even until the Warsaw Uprising in 1944.

Gorczyński's literary work was characterized by the affirmation of native customs, familiar landscapes, and ancient legends, with its main features being patriotism, regionalism, historicism, and populism. From 1835 to 1845, he was one of the most widely read Polish writers. He first published poetic works in Rozmaitości Lwowskie in 1819. He wrote 21 dramatic works that were performed in theaters in Kraków, Lviv, Warsaw, and Poznań. His son Bronisław published collections of his poems and play texts after the writer's death. Gorczyński printed them earlier in various periodicals such as Sławianin, Rozmaitości, Przyjaciel Ludu, Czas, and Biblioteka Warszawska.

Plowing fathers' field,
If a hidden legend's yield,
String it on our rosary's chain,
A spark of old stones, make it plain.
Brush against a stone, long ignored,
From its depths, a spark restored,
To brighten the thoughts of kin,
Unearthing tales buried within;
If less fortune smiles your way,
From hills and huts, a scene to sway,
Craft a picture for all to see,
In every stroke, our history;
Many a capital, our fathers' land,
Painted with patterns, hand in hand,
Feeds our eyes with beauty's grace,
Leaves a mark, in time and space.

— Adam Gorczyński, the beginning of the poem Grodzisko

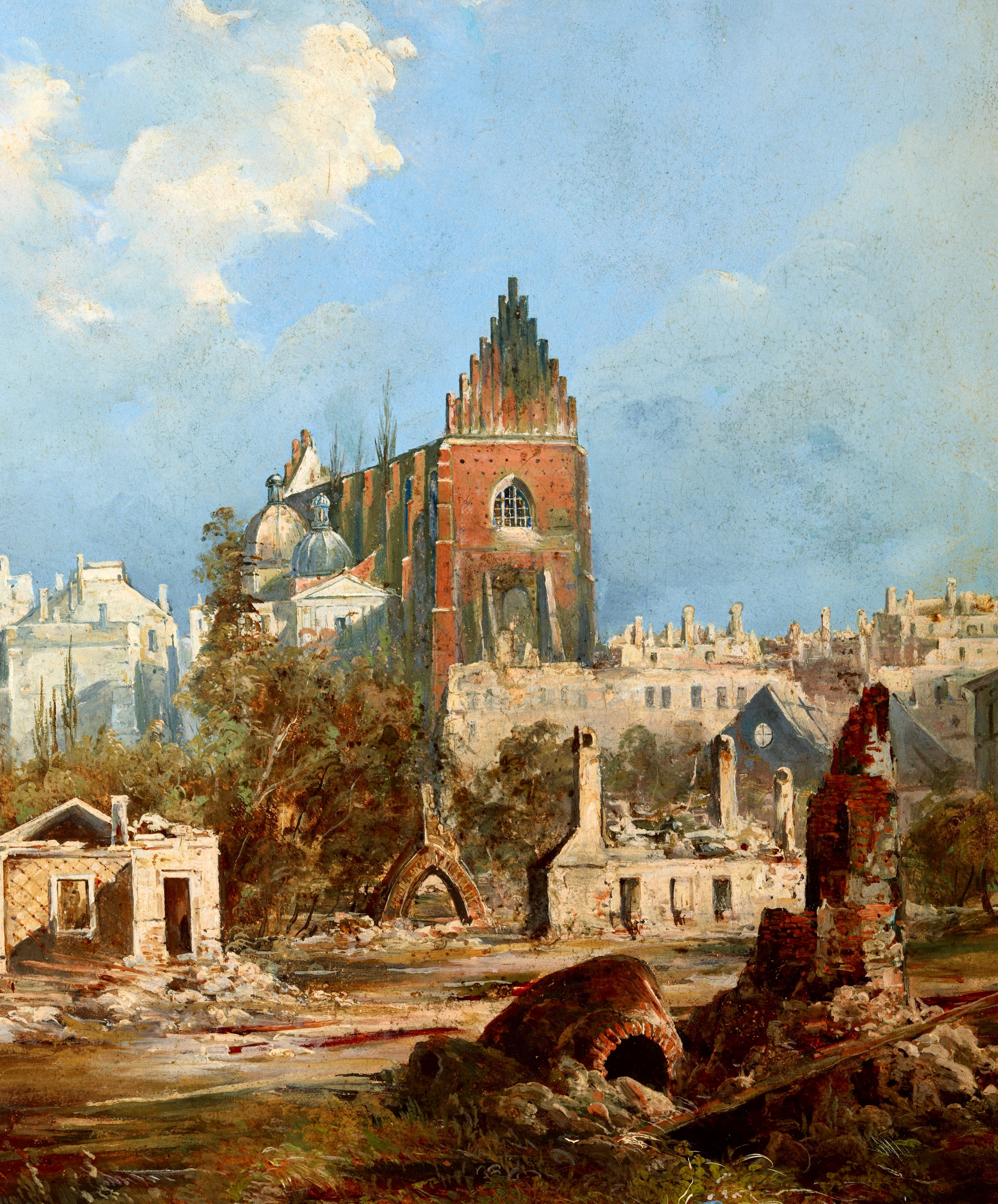
The Dominican Church in Kraków after the fire of 1850, 1850, 29×25 cm, National Museum in Kraków, NMK II-a-58

Characteristic of Gorczyński's work were stories akin to gawęda szlachecka. This genre mimicked oral tales, seemingly casual, filled with elaborate digressions and commentary. The themes of these works focused on vignettes from the everyday lives of the old middle-class nobility, and their composition resembled genre scenes. This was a consequence of the similarity the author saw between literature and painting. Among the most popular stories were: Zamek Libusza; Kto się w opiekę poda Panu Swemu; Niedźwiedzica; Górnice; Kwestia o Wilczy Dołek; Żaki; Kapitalik; Syn Chrzestny; Hełm Jaksy; Wróżba Maruchy; Pan Królowej ruskiej; Zwierciadełko; Skała św. Onufrego, czyli kronika szlacheckiego dworku; Kasperek; Straszny strzelec. Some of these stories were translated into Czech and German.

Powieści Jadama in the form of legends and fairy tales from near Kraków were published in 1838. In 1842, he published in Lviv a collection Opowieści i legendy Jadama z Ziemi Zatorskiej, the extensive review of which was published in the monthly Biblioteka Warszawska, and which became a reading material in 1852 in a Polish high school in Cieszyn. In this collection, he included legends concerning Zakrzów, as well as Nowe Dwory, of which he was the owner. In the same year, he printed Silva Rerum Jadama in the literary form of silva rerum, which was a continuation of Opowieści. He was also the author of two novels of manners – Farmazon (1844) and Zeno (1845).

Gorczyński's books belonged to popular Romanticism, intended for a wide audience. Their content was medieval stories, which the writer developed and embellished with his own imagination. Some of them (e.g., Balice, Zmesta, Hełm Jaksy) were based on fragments of chronicles by Jan Długosz and Marcin Bielski. The action of Gorczyński's historical tales often took place in romantic-gothic scenery, such as dungeons and castles, mysterious caves and abandoned chapels (the story Balice). His illustrated legend Pogoń Tatarów, located in Czorsztyn Castle, was published in 1847.

He used the pseudonym "Jadam of Zator", emphasizing his affiliation with a specific region, with its own culture and history. This kind of literary mystification, often used in Romanticism, was intended to authenticate the presented works as stories heard from common folk. The basis for these works were legends recorded by Gorczyński during his national wanderings, often with friends – Wincenty Pol, Jan Nepomucen Głowacki, and Leon Dembowski. After the tragic events of the Galician Peasant Uprising, he clearly changed the message of his publications towards organic work.

He translated the poems of the Czech poet Václav Hanka. He also engaged in translating the poetry of German romantics Friedrich Schiller and Johann Goethe. He also translated William Shakespeare's Romeo and Juliet, which relied on well-known sentimental conventions supplemented with elements of hagiography and gawęda szlachecka. The translation of Romeo and Juliet was not performed in the 19th century. Gorczyński's catalog of works is found in the Estreicher Bibliography. In the extensive monograph Outline of the History of Polish Literature from 1860, dramas authored by him were highly praised: In them (the dramas), uncommon talent shines, there are scenes of wondrous beauty, which he masterfully renders, capturing the spirit of the age brilliantly, yet also alongside this there are flat, unremarkable chambers.

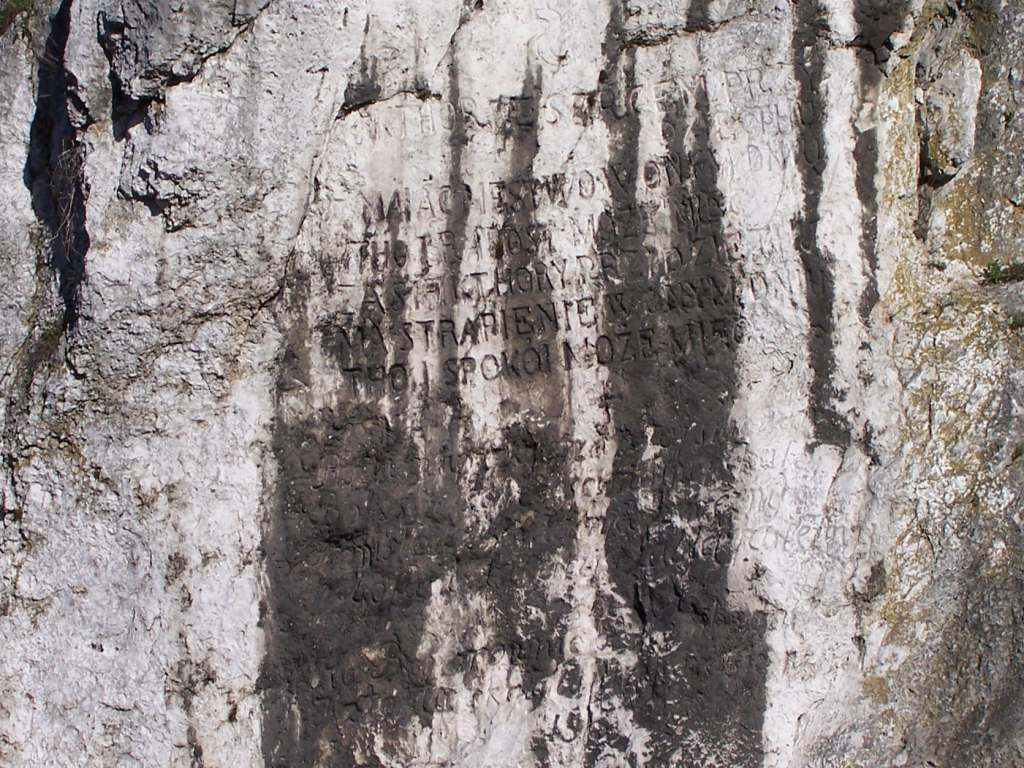
Inscription (Note: The inscription carved in the rock was restored in 2016 and is visible from road 774 (Stanisław Kmita Street), 1100 m from road 79 (Krakowska Street) in Zabierzów.) of a poem by Adam Gorczyński on the Kmita Rock

At the beginning of the 1860s, he ceased his literary activity. A quarter of a century after his death, he was described as a novelist and playwright, once quite renowned, whose works were favorably received because they appeared during a great literary drought in the country and because they seemed to be based on local legends, which were highly valued at the time.

Karol Estreicher quotes Adam Gorczyński's words from their meeting in Kraków in 1852: I write in moments free from agricultural tasks. (...) Amidst so many literary coryphaeuses, a humble foot soldier cannot advance, and I live out my days peacefully in the countryside, as good God has ordained for me. In a contemporary Polish literature textbook for school use, it was stated in 1866 that he wrote several good novels, among which "Farmazon" (1844) stands out. "Silva rerum" (1842) is a collection of tales of barren content, but beautifully written in language.

Kraków's Czas in a posthumous tribute in 1876 wrote: Adam Gorczyński belonged to the slim ranks of writers who sought to enliven literary activity amidst the most enduring censorship and complete indifference to books. Józef Ignacy Kraszewski wrote about his novels: One can recognize exceptional talent, and above all, a fair understanding of the past and an understanding of its spirit without prejudice.

Romanticism initiated a modern national ideology and decisively influenced the adopted worldview and political positions in Poland. The selection of stories and poetry by Adam Gorczyński was published in 2014. A source-based analysis of Gorczyński's works in terms of local history based on the discovered parish archive in Stryszów, where his family were patrons, was published in 2021. In the consciousness of later generations, "Jadam of Zator" primarily emerged as a bard of the native areas and a lover of folk legends. He is recognized as a creator on the border between Romanticism and Positivism.

On Kmita Rock (in the landscape reserve above the Rudawa canyon in Garb Tenczyński near Kraków), there exists a fragment of his archaic verse, carved in 1854 at the behest of Professor Łepkowski, and at the expense of Count Skórzewski, (Note: The inscription carved in the rock was restored in 2016 and is visible from road 774 (Stanisław Kmita Street), 1100 m from road 79 (Krakowska Street) in Zabierzów.) renewed in 2016:

He who comes with heart so true,
Having courage in that view,
Though in joy he finds delight.
Yet he who comes with burdened sigh,
Bears sorrows as days pass by,
Still, in peace, he may alight.

— Adam Gorczyński

The poetic apotheosis Chleb was republished in 1918. Gorczyński's poem W grudniu! from 1884 was presented in 2020 as an example of a work helpful in educating contemporary students and healthcare workers. It was also noted that poetry of this kind enriches medical professionals and may protect them from occupational burnout.

In the heat he lies, sweat on his brow,
Doctor's fees beyond him now;
Kraków, distant, seems to mock,
But Mr. Wróbleski, like a rock,
Once visited, a kind grace,
Prescribed some medicine to embrace.
Will he again, in his plight,
Visit the poor man this night?

— Adam Gorczyński, W grudniu!

=== Paintings ===
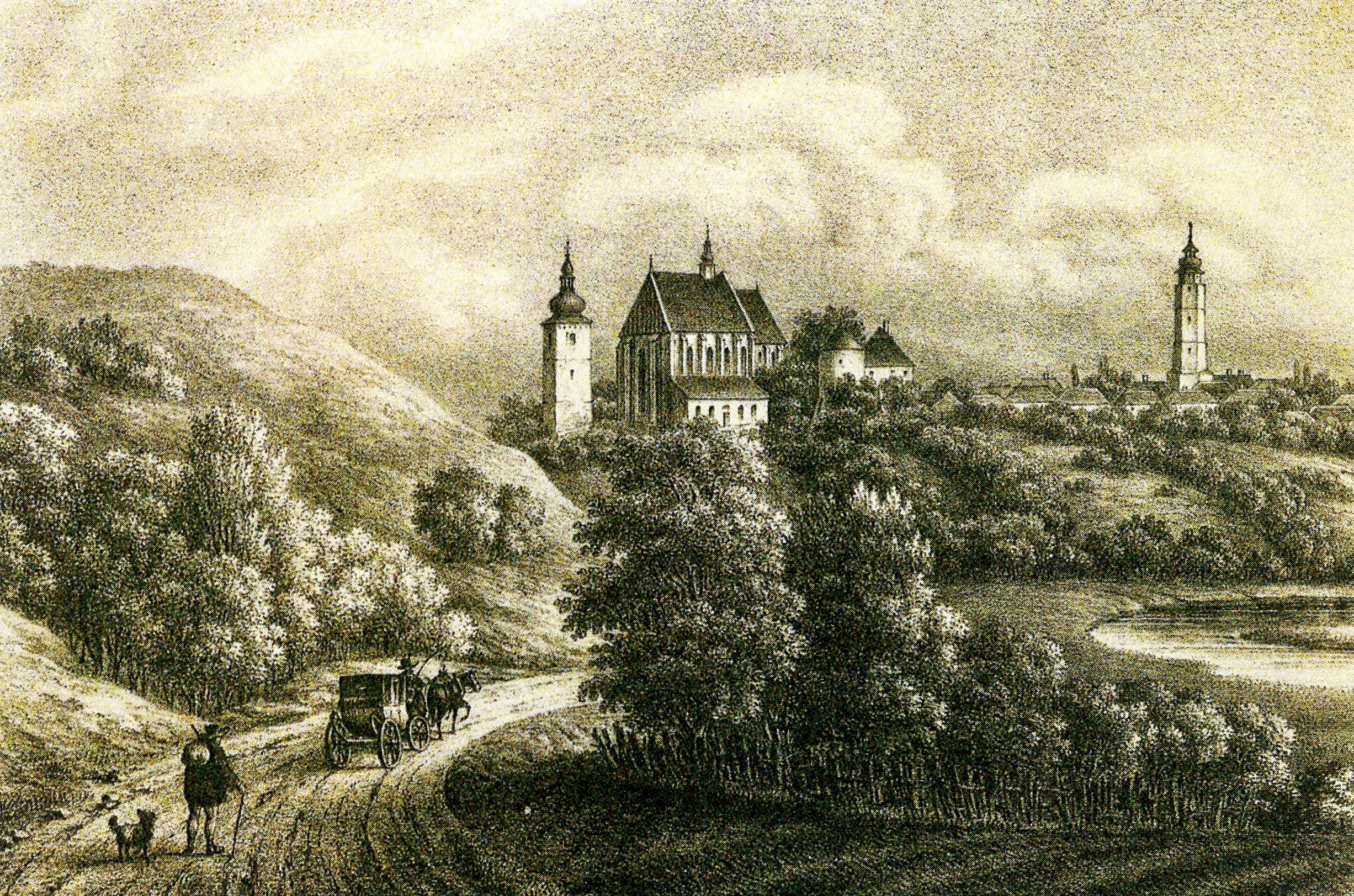
Lithograph Biecz, 1840

The ideological content of Adam Gorczyński's paintings also belonged to Polish Romanticism, in which realistic tendencies dominated, objectively representing reality. During this period, the birth of landscape painting as a separate subject in art occurred. Artists began to paint landscapes as they truly saw them. The characteristic features of this type of landscape were the approach to the subject, attention to detail, delicate lines, uniform texture, and expressive use of color.

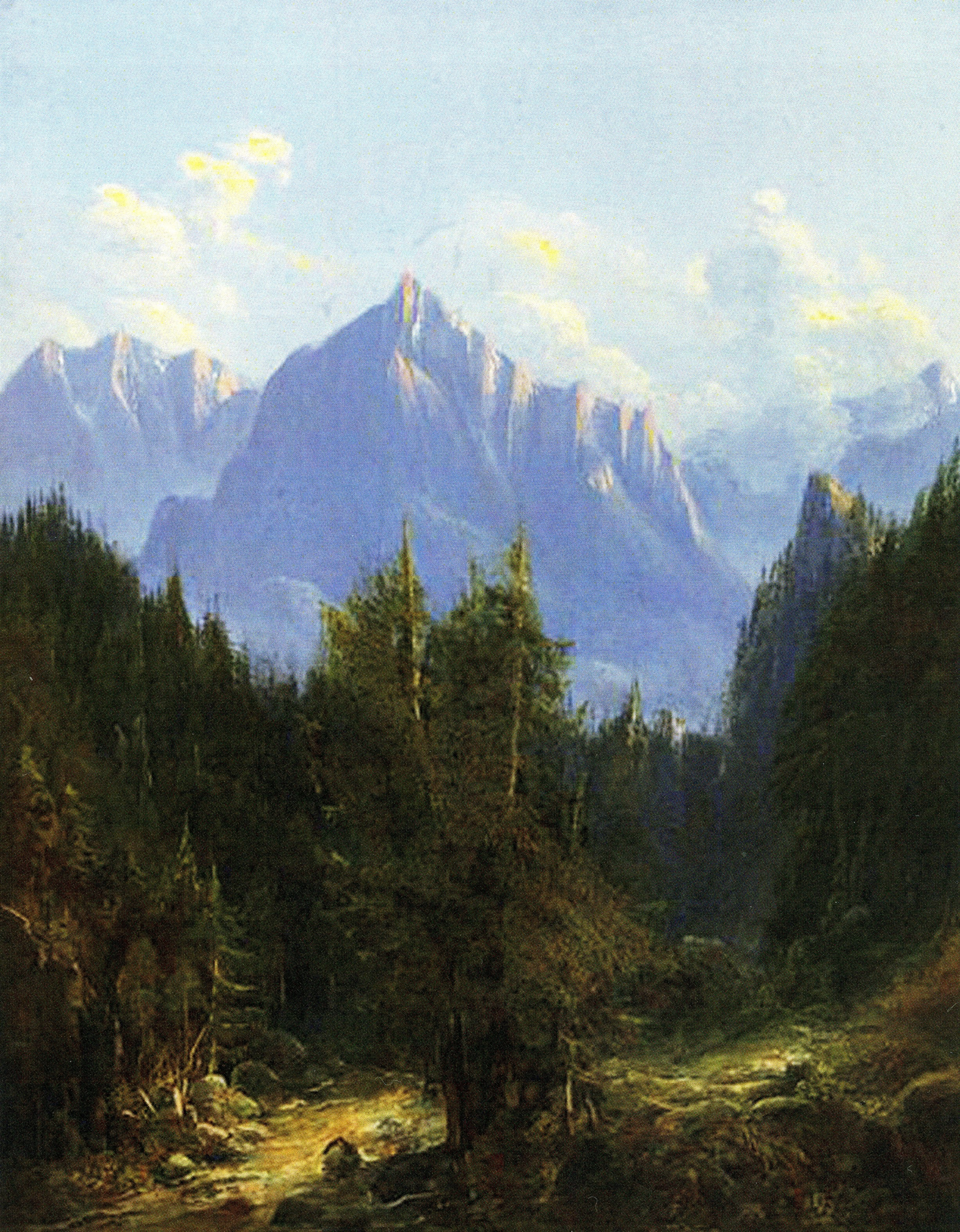
Road to Morskie Oko, 1850, 38.5×30.5 cm, National Museum in Kraków, NMK II-a-57

Gorczyński studied painting in Vienna under the landscape painter Franz Steinfeld (1787–1868), and also in Kraków under Jan Nepomucen Głowacki (1802–1847), who was named in 2016 by the Museum of Romanticism in Opinogóra as the "father of Polish landscape". They shared a fascination with the landscapes of Podhale and the Tatra Mountains. Gorczyński authored several hundred paintings in the style of Polish Romanticism, which, like his literary works, had a clear patriotic and independence character in the context of the political situation in partitioned Poland. He depicted society against the backdrop of local landscapes and historical monuments. The most common theme of his paintings were landscapes of his native land.

From his Viennese master, Steinfeld, he adopted an artistic form that originated directly from the 18th-century Alpine painting school, characterized by picturesque scenes, precise framing, and delicate colors. Light was the dominant element of his compositions. These principles corresponded with the assumptions of Polish Biedermeier, promoted by Głowacki – Gorczyński's friend and second mentor. Gorczyński himself was convinced of the correspondence between literature and painting, especially literary landscapes, about which he wrote in three essays: O Janie Nepomucenie Głowackim, artyście krakowskim, i o krajobrazie w obecnym czasie (1862), Obrazki rodzajowe (1855), and Pejzaż (Urywek z myśli o sztuce) (1853).

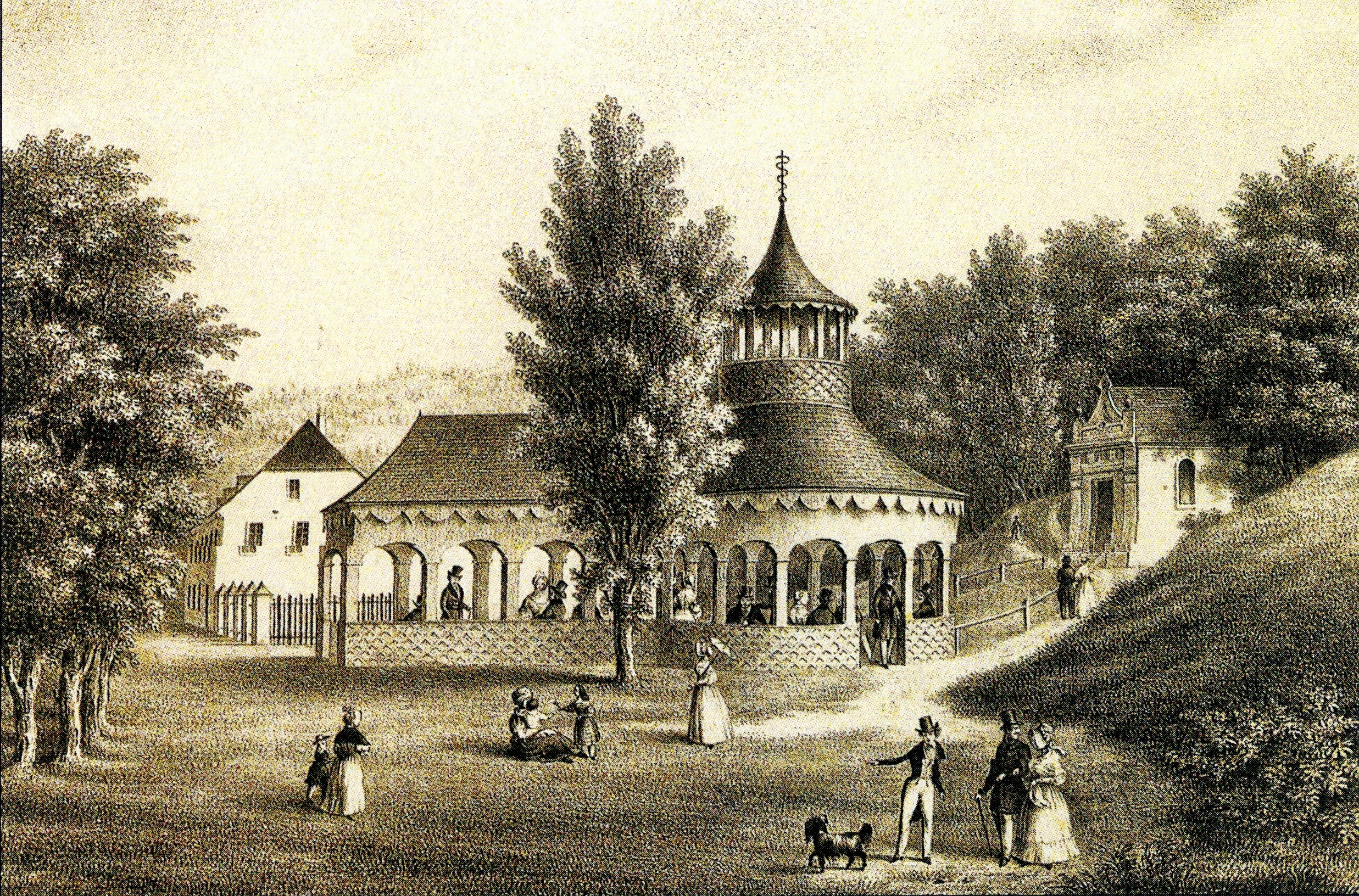
Lithograph Krynica (later Krynica-Zdrój), 1840

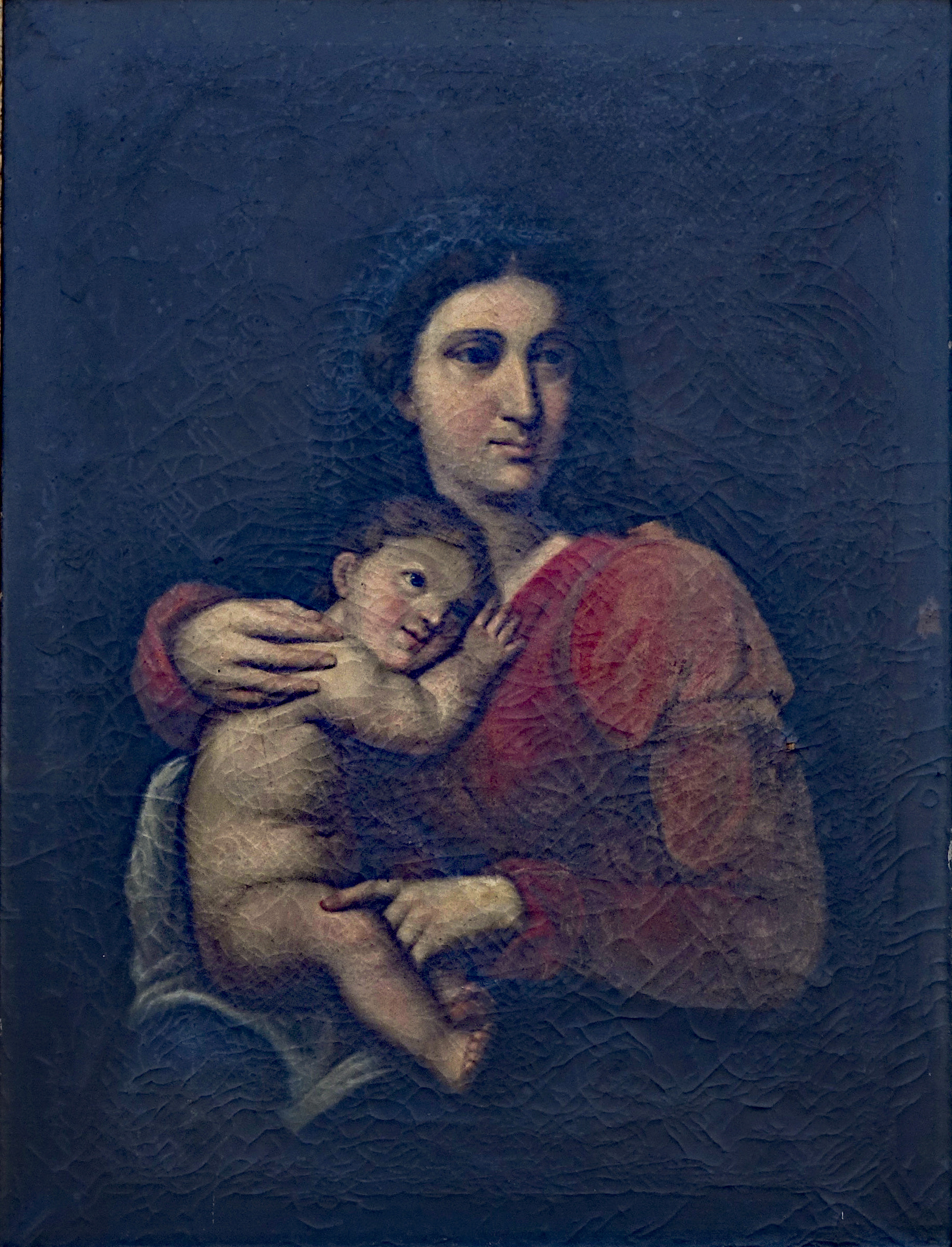
Madonna with Child, oil on canvas, 73 x 96 cm – painting probably by Adam Gorczyński (1805–1876), from 1943 in the parish church in Bolechowice

He painted in oil and watercolor, mostly landscapes, often with architectural motifs. In the album Galicyja w obrazach, he included 14 lithographs from the surroundings of Krosno, Nowy Sącz, Jasło, Tarnów, Krynica, and the Tatras. (Note: The painting was a donation (1884) by Bolesław, son of Adam Gorczyński, to the National Museum in Kraków, and in the catalog Images and Sculptures Owned by the National Museum – Provisional Catalog published in Kraków in 1898, it was called View from the Tatra Mountains. In later publications, the museum used the name Road to Morskie Oko.) The National Museum in Kraków houses his paintings The Road to Morskie Oko in the Tatra Mountains and The Dominican Church in Kraków after the 1850 fire. The Jagiellonian Library has: A View of Sanok, Mountain Landscape, The Herburtów Castle near Dobromil, and the Ossolineum preserves drawings: Czorsztyn – Ruins of the Castle, Czorsztyn, St. Mary's Church in Kraków, Bielany in Kraków, Pieskowa Skała (with the inscription on the back of the drawing: painted from nature by Adam Gorczyński, a student of Steinfeld). In the Podhale Museum in Nowy Targ, there are paintings View of the Tatras and Nowy Targ. He also exhibited his paintings at the Kraków Society of Friends of Fine Arts, of which he was a co-founder and long-time board member. Under the pseudonym "A* of Galicia", he exhibited in 1854 at the society's salon: A View of Kalwaria Zebrzydowska, The Road to Morskie Oko in the Tatra Mountains, A View of the Red Monastery from the Pieniny Mountains and Czarny Dunajec. In 1855, he exhibited Babia Góra at Dawn, Futor Mohort, Mohort Monastery, (Note: Based on scenes from the chivalric rhapsody Mohort by Wincenty Pol, of whom Adam Gorczyński was a friend.) Czchów, Brzegi Dunajca and Melsztyn. Gorczyński's paintings are present on the art market.

He treated both painting and literature as arts which main task is moral and educational influence on the audience. Gorczyński's Romantic sarmatism manifested itself in his fondness for the folklore of western Galicia, local color, idyllic landscapes, and the history of his homeland. He supported young painters interested in Polish landscapes.

In the parish church in Bolechowice, there is a painting Madonna with Child, probably by Adam Gorczyński. This painting belonged to the family collection in the Gorczyński manor in Brzeźnica, from where, due to the confiscation of property by the occupying Germans during World War II, it was taken by Adam's grandson Colonel Zygmunt Gorczyński (1881–1962) and in 1943 donated to the parish in Bolechowice.

=== Political and social activities ===
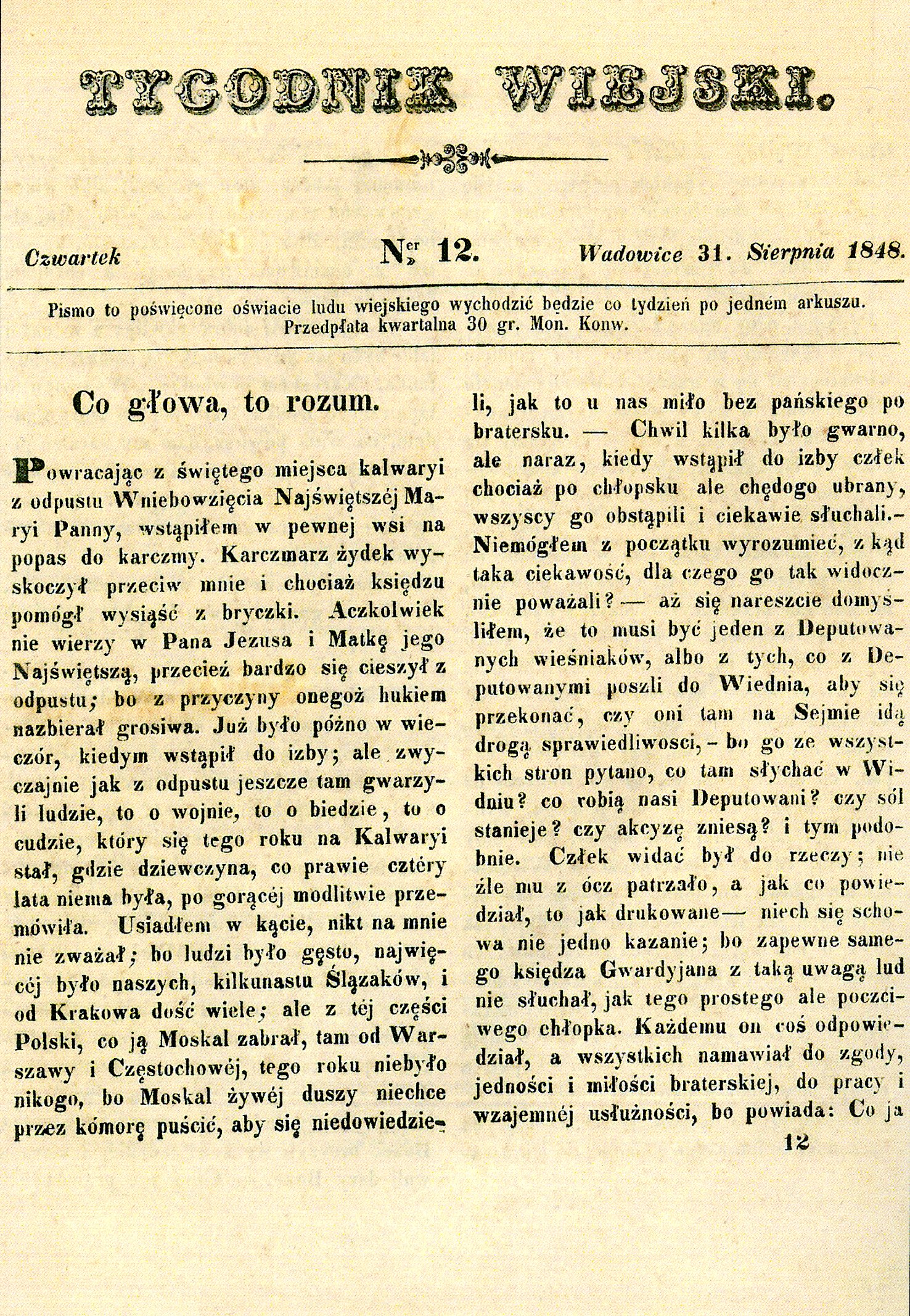
Excerpt from a feuilleton by Adam Gorczyński in the Wadowice-based Tygodnik Wiejski, 1848

From the early 1840s, Adam Gorczyński befriended and collaborated with Ludwik Klucki, a lawyer, Slavophile, and politician from Cieszyn, who, despite being Moravian, considered the Polish environment his own. Both were close to the group led by Prince Jerzy Henryk Lubomirski, who advocated the idea of unity among Austrian Slavs based on the Habsburg monarchy. In 1848, Gorczyński, along with Father Wacław Wąsikiewicz (1815–1896), a social activist and parson in Radocza, edited the Tygodnik Wiejski in Wadowice, aimed at elevating the sentiments of peasants in the spirit of social solidarity in the aftermath of the Galician Peasant Uprising of 1846. In 1848, he was elected as the president of the Wadowice National Council and in this capacity participated in the Prague Slavic Congress.

He published texts on current social and political topics in the Dziennik Mód Paryskich (English: Paris Fashion Journal), a publication in Lviv during the 1840s–1849s, whose title was a misleading camouflage for Austrian censorship vigilance. From 1848, he was an active member of the Galician Agricultural Society. He belonged to the Kraków Agricultural Society. From 1855 to 1856, he was the president of the Galician Forestry Society. Since 1850, he was the conservator of monuments in the Wadowice and Bochnia districts. He initiated a public fundraiser for a monument to his friend Wincenty Pol (1807–1872), a poet and geographer. In 1854, he was a co-founder of the Kraków Society of Friends of Fine Arts. In 1876, he founded an elementary school in Brzeźnica and an agricultural school in Czernichów. He was also a patron of the church in Marcyporęba.

== Commemoration ==
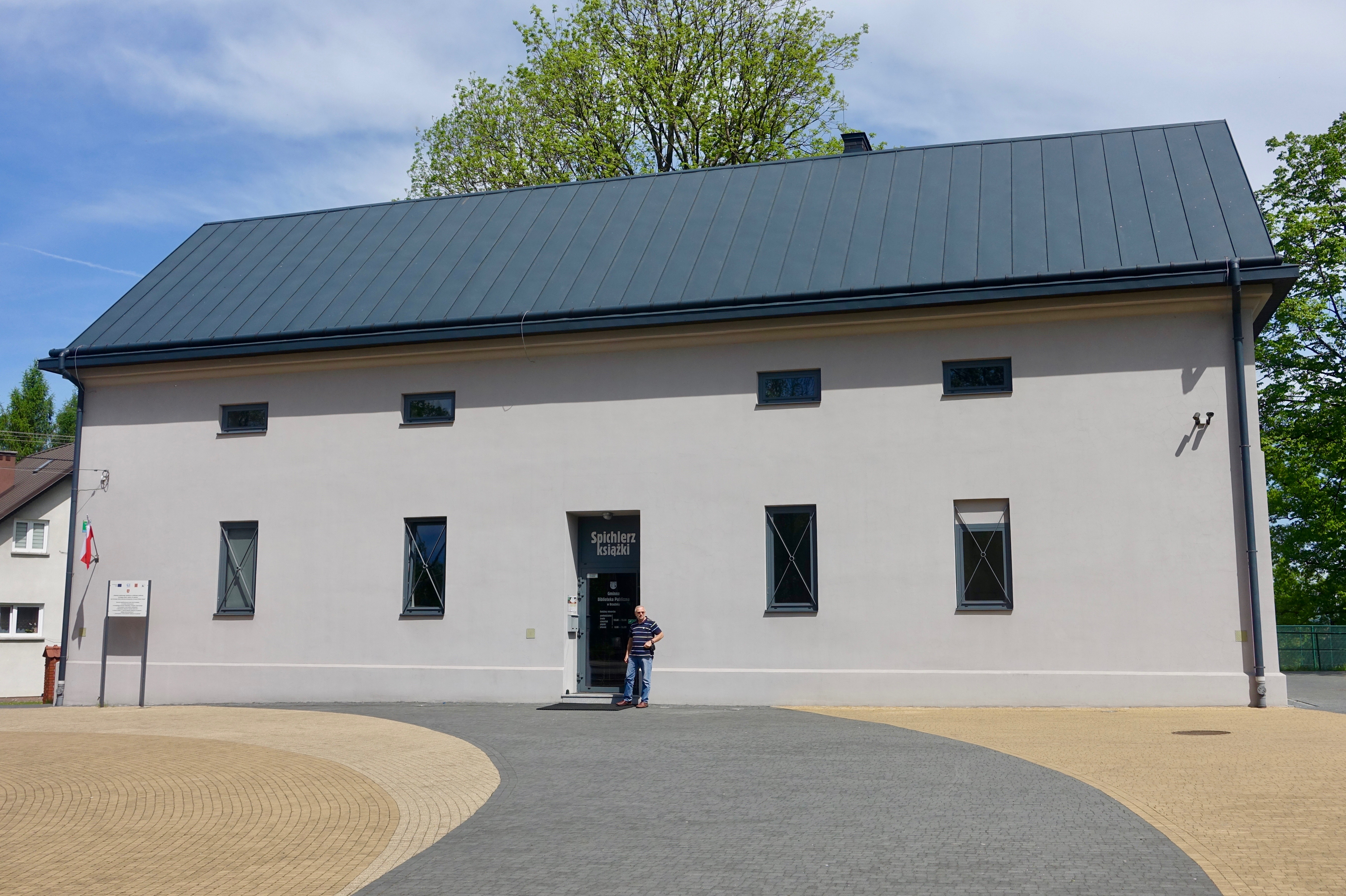
Former Gorczyński manor granary – since 2014 Municipal Grainhouse of Books, headquarters of the Municipal Public Library in Brzeźnica

During the German occupation, the manor in Brzeźnica, along with the entire estate, was seized by the Germans (1940) from its then owner, Adam's grandson Zygmunt Gorczyński (1881–1962), a retired colonel in the Polish Army, who had previously served as a major in the Austrian cavalry. The manor in Brzeźnica was left in ruins after the war by various occupants, (Note: The condition of the mansion in Brzeźnica in a May 2010 photograph.) and the monument at Adam Gorczyński's grave was dismantled in the early 1970s.

Forgotten for years, Adam Gorczyński returned to collective memory. In 2012, an updated study of Gorczyński's work was published, which led to his selection as an extraordinary figure of spiritual life from our region as the patron of the painting exhibition Charming Monuments of the Carp Valley in Tomice near Wadowice. Thanks to subsequent local initiatives, the Municipal Public Library in Brzeźnica published the monograph Romantyk z Brzeźnicy in 2014, which also included a selection of Adam Gorczyński's literary works. On 29 May 2015, in the former granary in Brzeźnica, the only remaining relic of the Gorczyński family estate, now the Municipal Grainhouse of Books, (Note: The Municipal Grainhouse of Books is open to the public.) which has been completely modernized, the first edition of the Adam Gorczyński Provincial Recitation Competition took place. In the same year, on October 14, the name of Adam Gorczyński was given to the Junior High School (School and Kindergarten Complex) in Brzeźnica, as well as to one of the streets. Recitation competitions continued to be held in the granary in subsequent years.
