= Kucharczyk =

Kucharczyk is a Polish surname, derived from the occupation of kucharz, i.e., cook. It may refer to:

- Alfred Kucharczyk (1937–2020), Polish gymnast
- Antoni Kucharczyk (1874–1944), Polish poet
- Karolina Kucharczyk (born 1991), Polish Paralympic athlete
- Krzysztof Kucharczyk (born 1957), Polish Olympic pistol shooter
- Michał Kucharczyk (born 1991), Polish footballer
- Radim Kucharczyk (born 1979), Czech ice hockey player
- Tymek Kucharczyk (born 2006), Polish auto racer
