= Nowe Dwory =

Nowe Dwory may refer to:

- Nowe Dwory, Lesser Poland Voivodeship
- Nowe Dwory, Greater Poland Voivodeship
