= Leśnica, Wadowice County =

Leśnica
- Village
- Location within Poland
- Coordinates: 49°49′30″N 19°43′0″E
- Country: Poland
- Voivodeship: Lesser Poland
- County: Wadowice
- Gmina: Stryszów
- Highest elevation: 370 m (1,210 ft)
- Lowest elevation: 320 m (1,050 ft)

Leśnica [lɛɕˈnit͡sa] is a village in the administrative district of Gmina Stryszów, within Wadowice County, Lesser Poland Voivodeship, in southern Poland.
