= Kossowa =

- Village
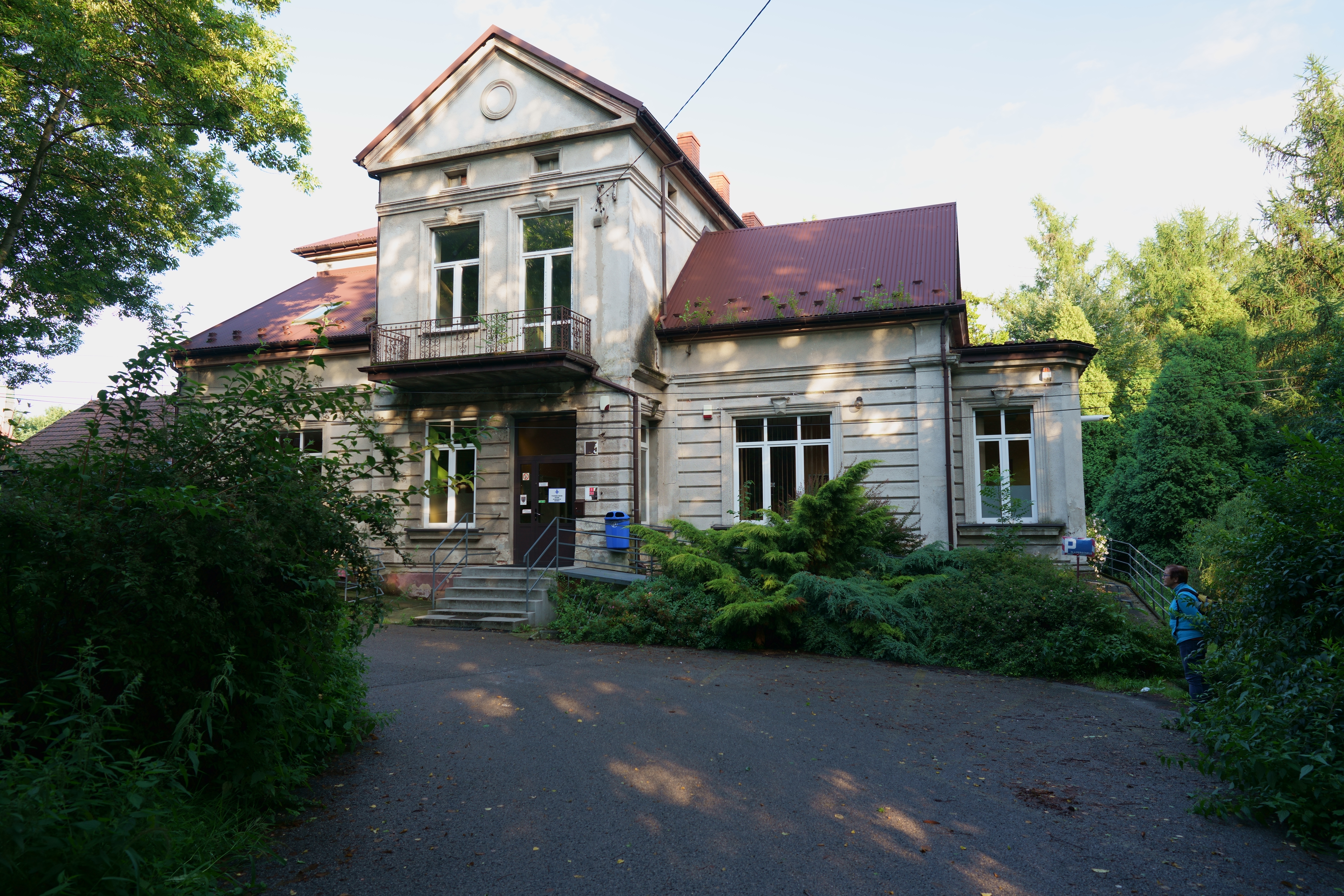
- Palace in Kossowa

- Location within Poland
- Coordinates: 49°57′55″N 19°34′52″E
- Country: Poland
- Voivodeship: Lesser Poland
- County: Wadowice
- Gmina: Brzeźnica
- Elevation: 280 m (920 ft)
- Population: 420

Kossowa [kɔsˈsɔva] is a village in the administrative district of Gmina Brzeźnica, within Wadowice County, Lesser Poland Voivodeship, in southern Poland.
