= Gmina Stryszów =

Gmina Stryszów Stryszów Commune
- Gmina
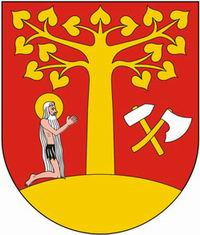
- Coat of arms
- Interactive map of Gmina Stryszów
- Coordinates (Stryszów): 49°50′N 19°37′E
- Country: Poland
- Voivodeship: Lesser Poland
- County: Wadowice
- Seat: Stryszów

Area
  - Total: 46.05 km^{2} (17.78 sq mi)

Population (2006)
  - Total: 6,690
  - Density: 145/km^{2} (376/sq mi)
- Website: http://www.stryszow.pl

Gmina Stryszów is a rural gmina (administrative district) in Wadowice County, Lesser Poland Voivodeship, in southern Poland. Its seat is the village of Stryszów, which lies approximately 11 kilometres (7 mi) south-east of Wadowice and 35 km (22 mi) south-west of the regional capital Kraków.

The gmina covers an area of 46.05 square kilometres (17.8 sq mi), and as of 2006 its total population is 6,690.

== Villages ==
Gmina Stryszów contains the villages and settlements of Dąbrówka, Łękawica, Leśnica, Stronie, Stryszów and Zakrzów.

== Neighbouring gminas ==
Gmina Stryszów is bordered by the gminas of Budzów, Kalwaria Zebrzydowska, Lanckorona, Mucharz, Wadowice and Zembrzyce.
