= Brzeźnica, Wadowice County =

Brzeźnica
- Village
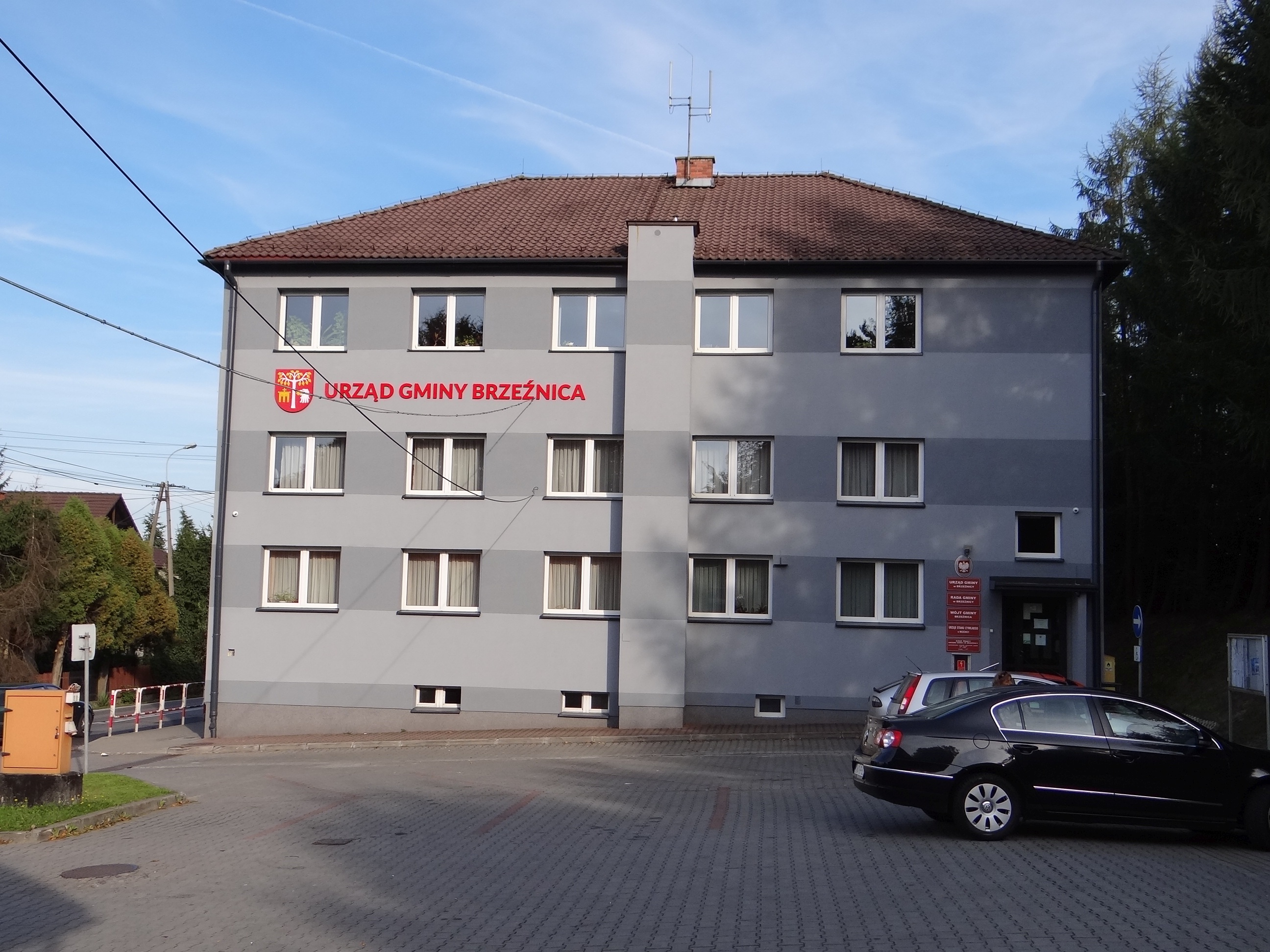
- Gmina Brzeźnica municipal office

- Location within Poland
- Coordinates: 49°58′N 19°38′E
- Country: Poland
- Voivodeship: Lesser Poland
- County: Wadowice
- Gmina: Brzeźnica
- Elevation: 230 m (750 ft)

Population
  - Total: 1,200

Brzeźnica [bʐɛʑˈnit͡sa] is a village in Wadowice County, Lesser Poland Voivodeship, in southern Poland. It is the seat of the gmina (administrative district) called Gmina Brzeźnica.

Until 1876, the owner of the village was Adam Gorczyński, a Romantic writer and painter, then his son Bronisław Gorczyński.
