= Barbara Maria Zakrzewska-Nikiporczyk =

Polish composer and musicologist (1946–2023)

Barbara Maria Zakrzewska-Nikiporczyk (Poznań, 1 January 1946 – Poznań, 30 November 2023) was a Polish composer and musicologist. She studied composition with Florian Dąbrowski at the Poznań Academy of Music, graduating in 1969. She finished her postgraduate studies in library and information science in 1974; two years later she received a doctorate at the Institute of History, Adam Mickiewicz University in Poznań. She studied electronic music for three months in Utrecht, Netherlands, in 1981, and in Oxford, England.

== Life and career ==
Zakrzewska-Nikiporczyk began working in the music collection of the Poznań University Library in 1972. From 1982 through 1998 she was the chair of the Polish national committee of the Répertoire International de Littérature Musicale (RILM) in New York, and through this time she prepared over 800 abstracts of Polish music books and articles. In 1996 she began working as a bibliographer for another database project, the Retrospective Index to Music Periodicals (Répertoire International de la Presse Musicale; RIPM), and by 2000 she fully indexed five Polish music periodicals published during the 19th century (Echo Muzyczne, 1879-1882; Ruch Muzyczny, 1857-1862; Tygodnik Muzyczny, 1820-1821; Pamiętnik Muzyczny Warszawski, 1835-1836; and Gazeta Muzyczna i Teatralna, 1865-1866). Zakrzewska-Nikiporczyk became the librarian at the University of Southern California's Polish Music Center in 1998, where she catalogued the collections as a Kościuszko Foundation Fellow.

As a musicologist and librarian, Zakrzewska-Nikiporczyk has published 5 books and 68 articles, including her doctoral dissertation about music in Poland from 1870 to 1918. She has lectured in Poland, Germany, Italy and Sweden. Zakrzewska-Nikiporczyk received an award at the Young Polish Composers Competition in 1970 for her vocal work A Ave.

== Works ==
Her other compositions include:

=== Chamber music ===
- Cosmic Walks (for school band; 1983)
- Dream (string quartet; 1979)
- Enigma (flute, oboe, clarinet, bassoon, alto saxophone, violin, cello; 1979)
- Erotic (three flutes, vibraphone, celesta and harp; 1982)
- Flies (five double-basses; 1977)
- Folk Fantasy (flute and string quartet; 1979)
- Folk Mosaic: 1. Africa. 2. China. 3. Yugoslavia. 4. India. 5. Hungary. 6. Turkey. 7. Africa (for school band; 1978)
- Locomotive (percussion ensemble; 1976)
- Medium (saxophone, piano, vibraphone, cymbals and double-bass; 1974)
- On the Milky Way (string quartet; 1980)
- Percussion Triptych (five percussionists; 1975)
- Plato’s Music I (violin, piano, organ, harp, celesta and bells; 1974)
- Plato's Music II (string orchestra and percussion; 1974)
- Reflect (flute; 1968)
- Reminiscences (unspecified chamber ensemble; 1985)
- Rhythm of Lights and Shadows (organ and tympani; 1967)
- Silence and Darkness (string quartet; 1984)
- Solitude (double-bass, flute and percussion; 1980)
- S.O.S. (flute, saxophone, four temple blocks and violin; 1978)
- Space Walks (unspecified instrumental ensemble; 1983)
- Time (flute, 2 trumpets, 2 trombones, harp and tympani; 1976)
- To the Light (horn, violin and harp; 1975)
- Up and down (saxophone; 1993)

=== Electronic music ===
- Arteries (synthesizer music on tape; 1991)
- Manhattan (synthesizer, computer, tape, saxophone and percussion; 1990)
- Spectrum (computer; 1986)
- Waving (computer music on tape; 1996)

=== Keyboard ===
- Children’s World (piano; 1980)
- Deus Meus (organ; 1980)
- Magnificat (organ; 1989)
- Prelude (organ; 1987)
- Repetition (harpsichord; 1979)
- Sonatina (piano; 1965)
- Three Piano Pieces - 1983
- Variations (piano; 1964)

=== Orchestra ===
- Arrampicata – 1977
- Les Carillons (piano and orchestra; 1980)
- Miazga - 1983
- Orazione – 1981
- Pulp - 1983
- Star Dust (violin concerto; 1978)
- Tetragonos tri fatos - 1968/1969

=== Theatre ===
- Joan and Dragon Thomas (cartoons; 1978)
- Object’s Animation (cello; 1985)
- Snow White (ballet; women's choir and orchestra; 1976)

=== Voice ===
- A ave (narrator, soprano, men's choir and chamber ensemble; 1970)
- Buffo (text by Wisława Szymborska; voice and piano; 1985)
- Christmas Tree in the Forest (text by Ewa Szelburg; 1978)
- Clown (voice and piano; 1985)
- Contrary Music (men’s choir and orchestra; 1978)
- Eternity (soprano and percussion; 1966)
- Fortepian (soprano, marimba and bells; 1968)
- Four Songs for Children (text by Józef Ratajczak; 1980)
- Generation (soprano, trumpet, double-bass and cymbals; 1969)
- Give Us Peace, Lord (voice and piano;1983)
- Hail to the Light (a cappella men's choir; 1978)
- Hallucinations (soprano, mixed choir and chamber ensemble; 1967)
- High Trees (mixed choir; 1975)
- Hymn (text by Ryszard Danecki; mixed choir; 1978)
- Magnificat (mixed choir; 1985)
- Mother (soprano and string orchestra; 1974)
- Silence and Darkness (text by Wanda Bacewicz; mixed choir; 1984)
- Skrzypce (soprano, harpsichord and tamburino; 1968)
- The Saw Has Danced with the Axe (text by Stanisław Karaszewski; voice and piano; 1985)
- Two Religious Songs (text by Antoni Kucharczyk and Maria Bartusówna; 1981)
- Warmio moja (cantata for soprano, mixed choir, flute and string orchestra; 1985)
- Welcome Brilliance (text by Ryszard Danecki; men's choir; 1978)
