= Dąbrówka, Wadowice County =

Dąbrówka
- Village
- Location within Poland
- Coordinates: 49°49′N 19°36′E
- Country: Poland
- Voivodeship: Lesser Poland
- County: Wadowice
- Gmina: Stryszów
- Population: 840

Dąbrówka [dɔmˈbrufka] is a village in the administrative district of Gmina Stryszów, within Wadowice County, Lesser Poland Voivodeship, in southern Poland.
