= Tłuczań =

- Village
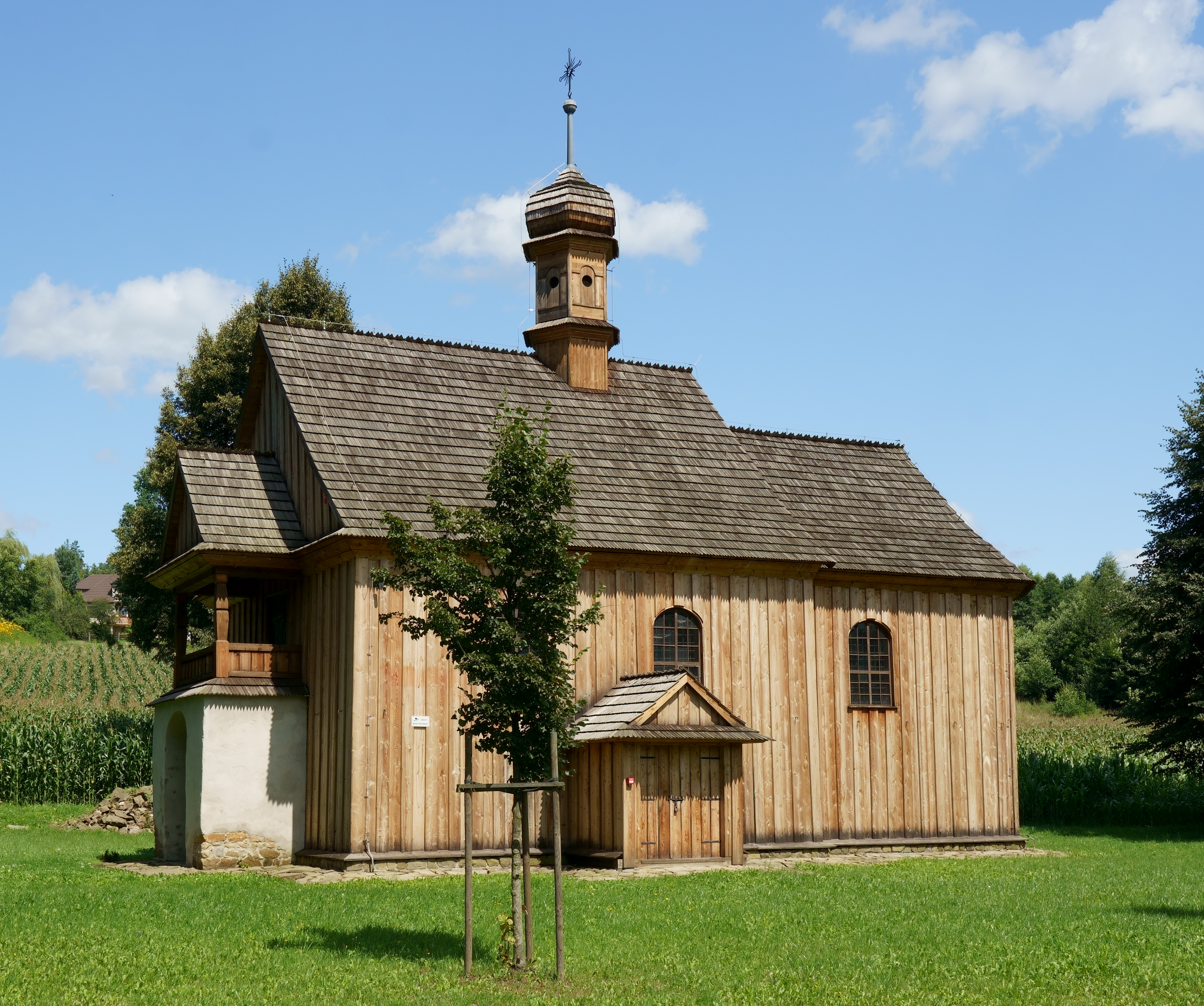
- Catholic church

- Location within Poland
- Coordinates: 49°57′17″N 19°34′36″E
- Country: Poland
- Voivodeship: Lesser Poland
- County: Wadowice
- Gmina: Brzeźnica
- Highest elevation: 320 m (1,050 ft)
- Lowest elevation: 250 m (820 ft)

Tłuczań [ˈtwut͡ʂaɲ] is a village in the administrative district of Gmina Brzeźnica, within Wadowice County, Lesser Poland Voivodeship, in southern Poland.
