= Kopytówka =

- Village
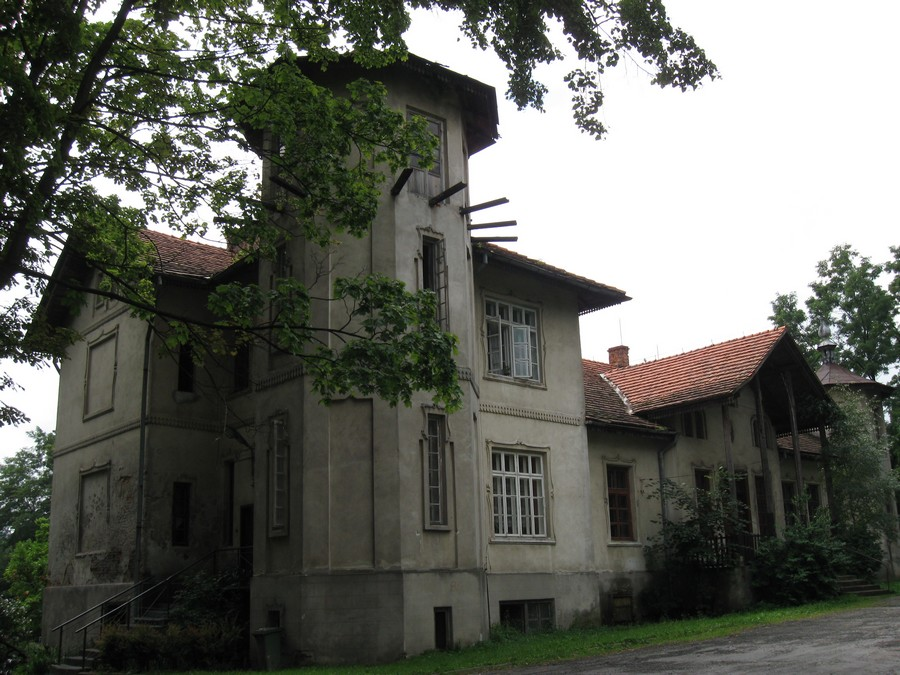
- Palace in Kopytówka

- Location within Poland
- Coordinates: 49°56′N 19°38′E
- Country: Poland
- Voivodeship: Lesser Poland
- County: Wadowice
- Gmina: Brzeźnica

Kopytówka [kɔpɨˈtufka] is a village in the administrative district of Gmina Brzeźnica, within Wadowice County, Lesser Poland Voivodeship, in southern Poland.
