= Brzezinka, Gmina Brzeźnica =

Brzezinka
- Village
- Location within Poland
- Coordinates: 49°57′N 19°38′E
- Country: Poland
- Voivodeship: Lesser Poland
- County: Wadowice
- Gmina: Brzeźnica
- Population: 391

Brzezinka (Polish pronunciation: [bʐɛˈʑiŋka]) is a village in the administrative district of Gmina Brzeźnica, within Wadowice County, Lesser Poland Voivodeship, in southern Poland.
