= Łączany, Lesser Poland Voivodeship =

Łączany
- Village
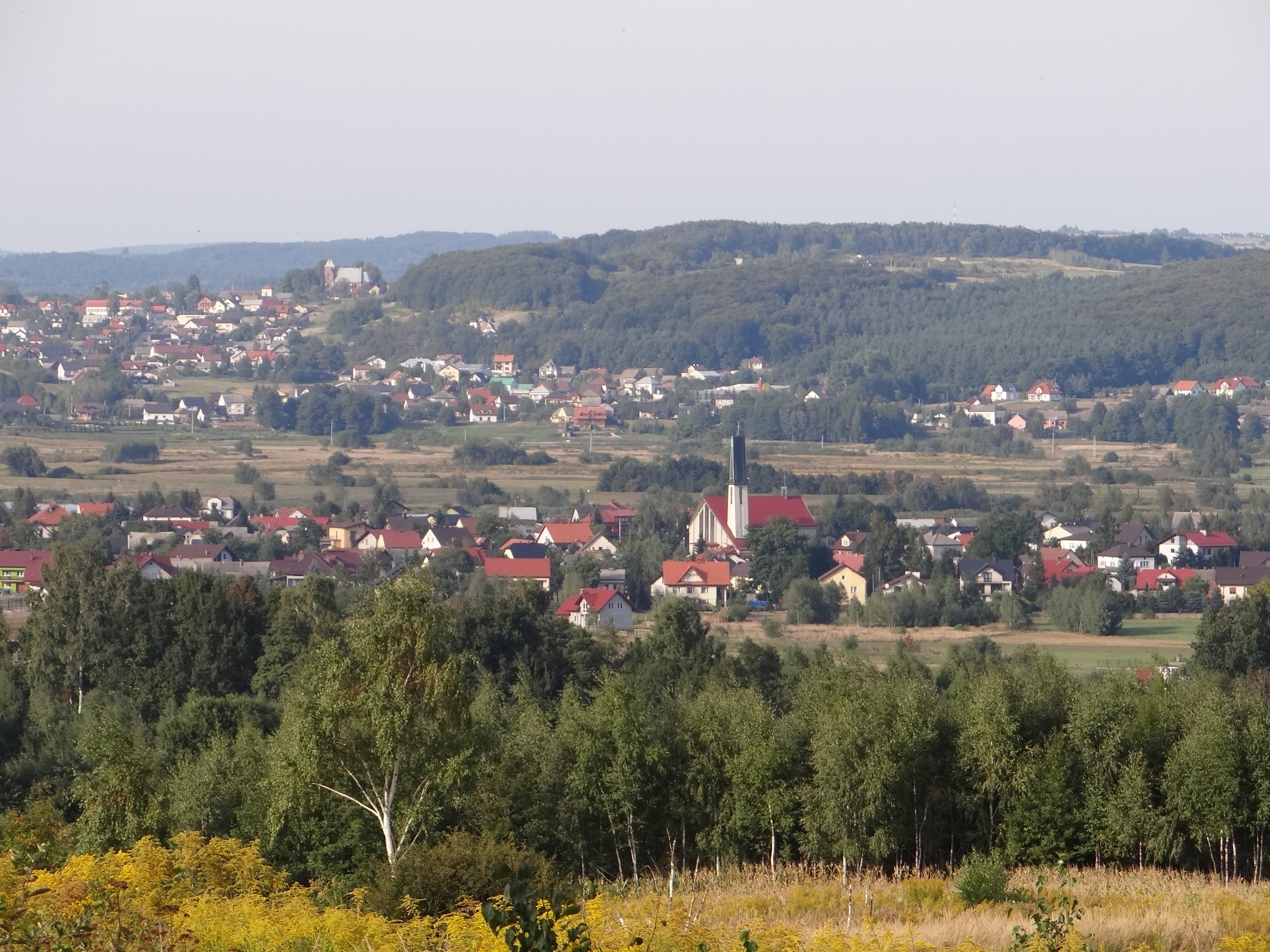

- Location within Poland
- Coordinates: 49°59′N 19°34′E
- Country: Poland
- Voivodeship: Lesser Poland
- County: Wadowice
- Gmina: Brzeźnica
- Population: 2,000

Łączany [wɔnˈt͡ʂanɨ] is a village in the administrative district of Gmina Brzeźnica, within Wadowice County, Lesser Poland Voivodeship, in southern Poland.
