= Sosnowice, Lesser Poland Voivodeship =

Sosnowice
- Village
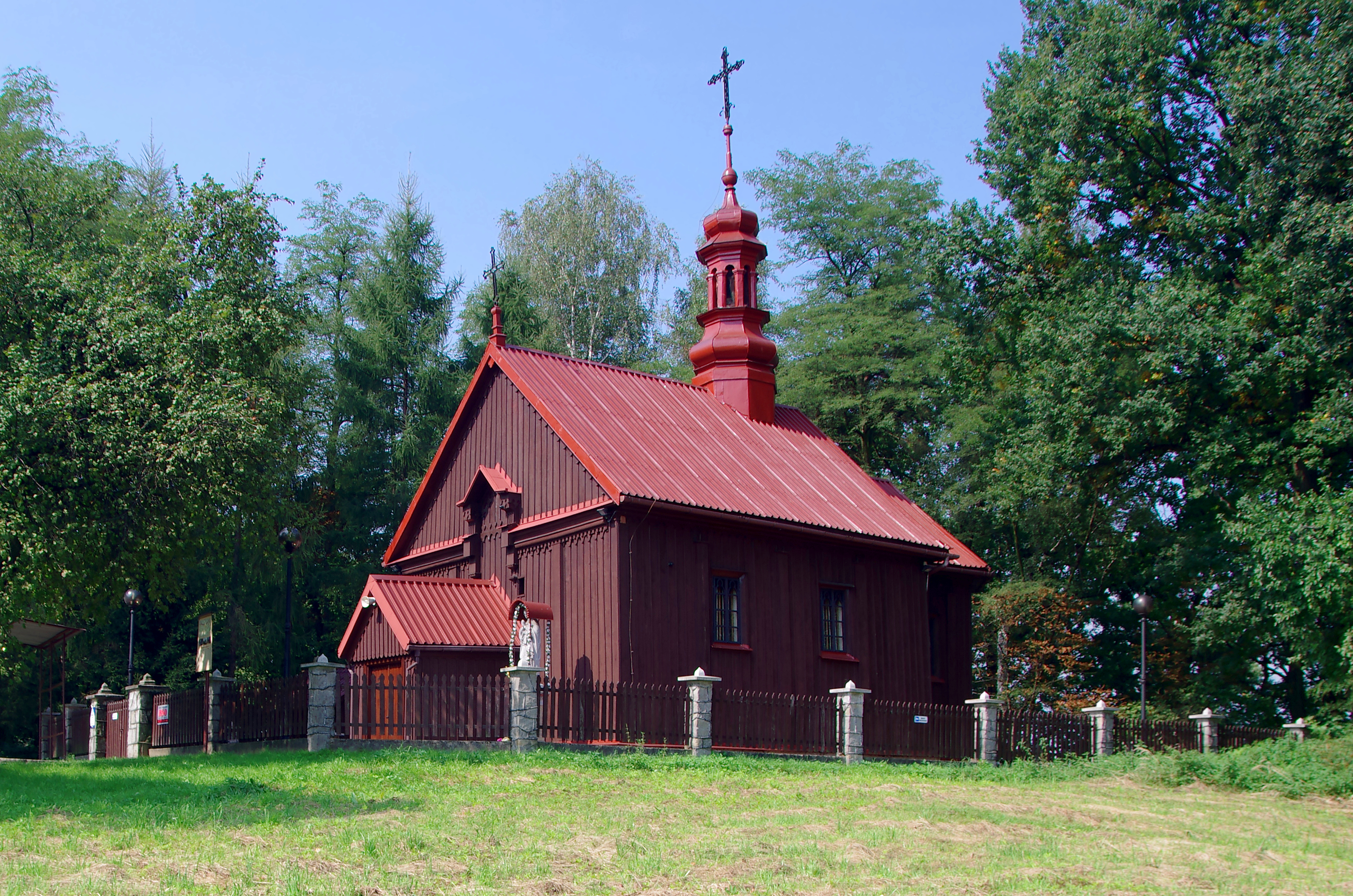
- Catholic church

- Location within Poland
- Coordinates: 49°57′N 19°43′E
- Country: Poland
- Voivodeship: Lesser Poland
- County: Wadowice
- Gmina: Brzeźnica
- Elevation: 235 m (771 ft)

Sosnowice [sɔsnɔˈvit͡sɛ] is a village in the administrative district of Gmina Brzeźnica, within Wadowice County, Lesser Poland Voivodeship, in southern Poland.
