= Chrząstowice, Wadowice County =

Chrząstowice
- Village
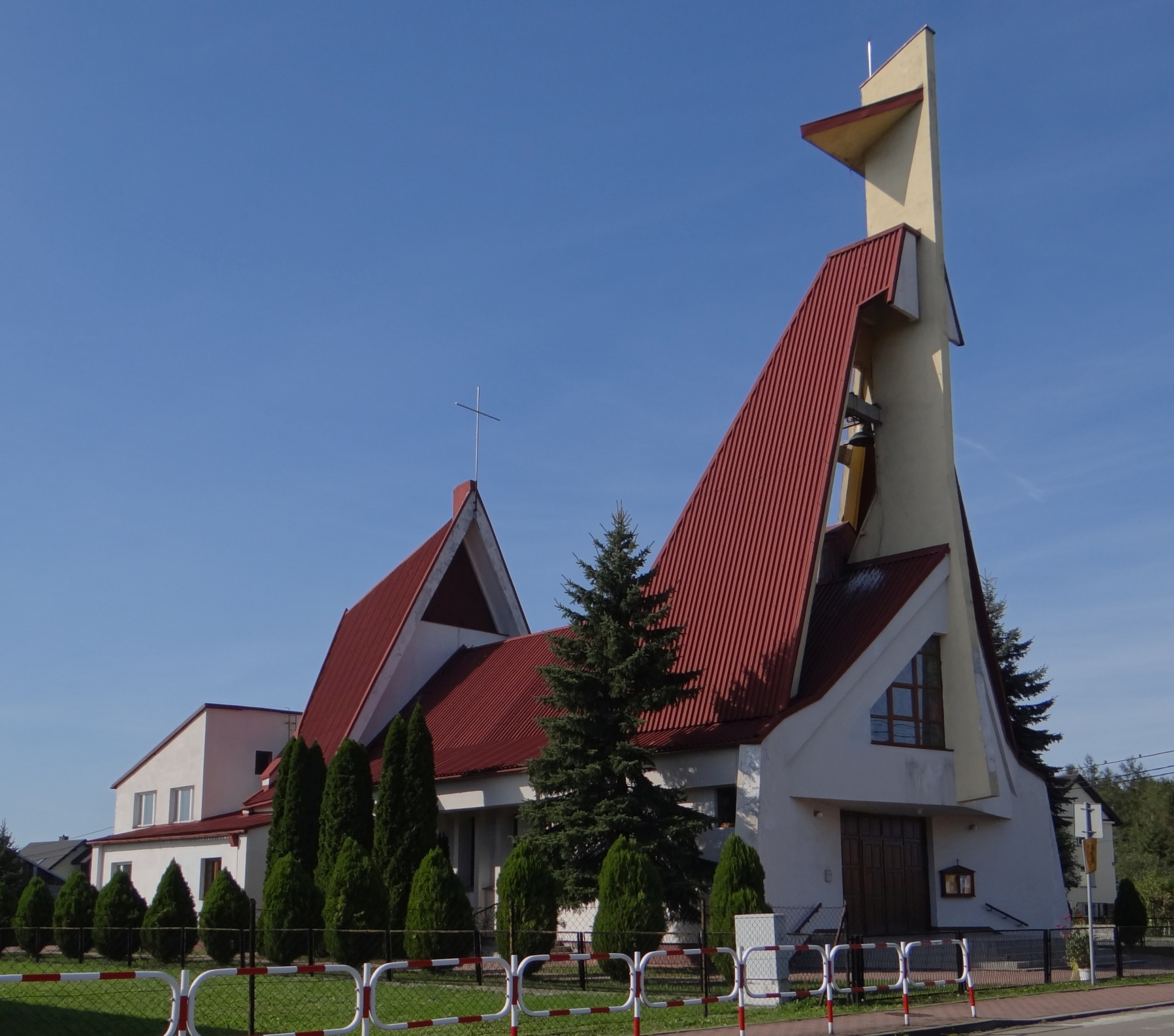
- Catholic church

- Location within Poland
- Coordinates: 49°58′N 19°36′E
- Country: Poland
- Voivodeship: Lesser Poland
- County: Wadowice
- Gmina: Brzeźnica
- Elevation: 220 m (720 ft)

Chrząstowice [xʂɔ̃stɔˈvit͡sɛ] is a village in the administrative district of Gmina Brzeźnica, within Wadowice County, Lesser Poland Voivodeship, in southern Poland.
