= Antoni Kucharczyk =

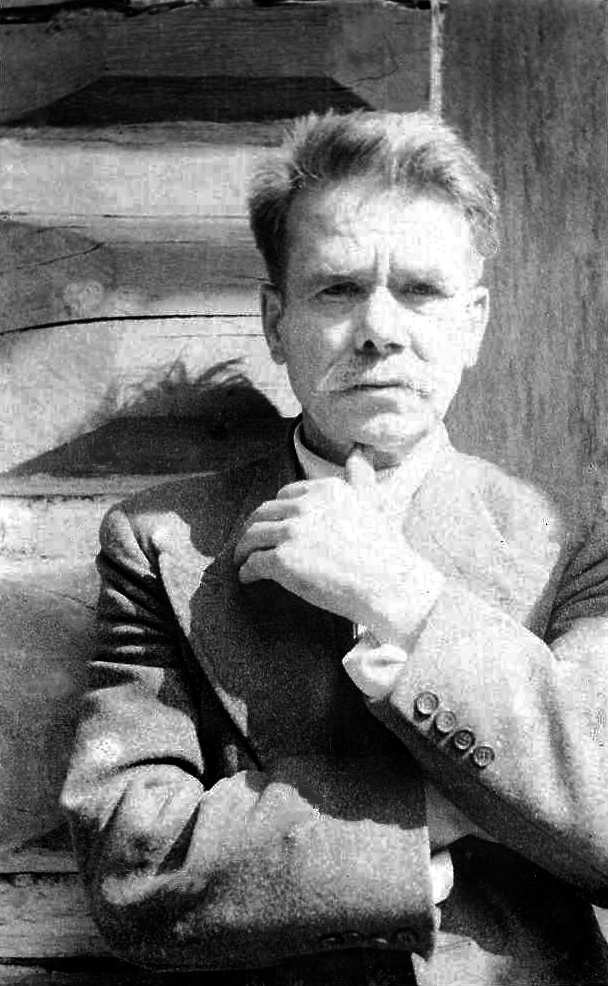
- Antoni Kucharczyk
- Born: 2 August 1874; Bęczyn, Austria-Hungary
- Died: 11 May 1944 (aged 69); Paszkówka, Poland
- Occupation: poet
- Writing career
- Pen name: Antek z Bugaja, Bartek Mądrala, Jantek Bugański, Jantek z Bugaja, parobek wiejski, Maciek Bzdura

Antoni Kucharczyk (born 2 August 1874 in Bęczyn, Austria-Hungary (now Poland) – 11 May 1944 in Paszkówka) was a Polish poet.

He became well known during 1900 and 1915.

In 1933 he became the president of the Polish Writer's Union of People.

Composer Barbara Maria Zakrzewska-Nikiporczyk used Kucharczyk's text for her composition "Two Religious Songs" in 1981.
