= Jan Nepomucen Głowacki =

Polish painter (1802–1847)

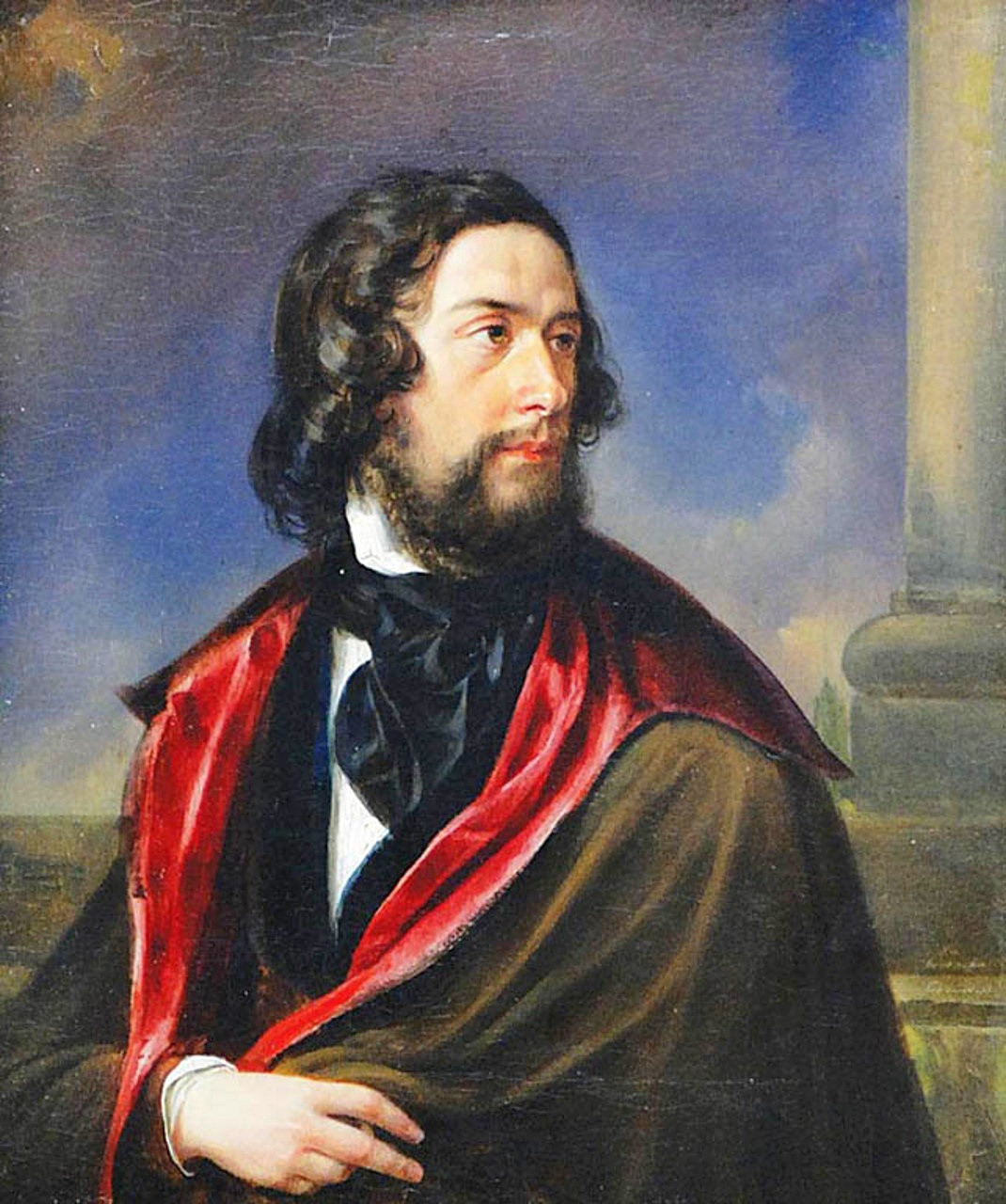
- Oil on canvas, 1842 (unnamed)
- Born: 1802; Kraków, Poland
- Died: July 28, 1847 (aged 44–45); Kraków, Poland
- Education: Academy of Fine Arts, Kraków; Academy of Fine Arts, Munich; Accademia di Belle Arti, Rome
- Known for: Painting, art history
- Movement: Realism

Jan Nepomucen Głowacki (1802 – July 28, 1847) was a Polish realist painter of the Romantic era, regarded as the most outstanding landscape painter of the early 19th century in Poland under the foreign partitions. Głowacki studied painting at the Kraków School of Fine Arts and later at the academies of Prague and Vienna, as well as Rome and Munich. He returned to Kraków in 1828, and became a teacher of painting and drawing. From 1842 he served as a professor in the Faculty of Landscape Painting at the School of Fine Arts. His work can be found at the National Museum of Poland and its branches. Some of his work was looted by Nazi Germany in World War II and has never been recovered.

== Work ==
Głowacki was born in Kraków, where he lived for most of his life. He took his first art lessons with the painter Antoni Giziński, and between 1819 and 1825 attended the workshops of Józef Brodowski the Elder and Józef Peszka at the School of Fine Arts in Kraków. He continued his studies in Prague and then at the Academy of Fine Arts in Vienna under Franz Steinfeld until 1828. He went to Rome in 1834/35 and finished his studies in Munich. While abroad, he went by the name Jean Nepomuk Glowacki. Upon his return from Vienna, Głowacki became a teacher of art in his hometown and also a prolific artist. He painted mostly landscapes and city scapes, as well as portraits, and religious or mythological scenes. He was influenced by the Viennese school of realism, which was especially apparent in his portrait studies. Polish art critics and historians consider him the father of Polish school of landscape painting.

Głowacki was the first Polish artist to devote an entire series of works to the Tatra Mountains. He was also the first, to produce studies for his oil paintings on strenuous outdoor trips. Landscapes such as "Widok z Poronina" (View from Poronin, 1836) and "Morskie Oko" (1837) are said to mark the beginning of realist Polish mountain painting. His Romantic city scapes of Kraków and its environs became very popular during his lifetime thanks to an album of 24 prints that he published in 1836. He was married and had a son, Justyn Jan Głowacki, born in 1838, and a daughter Emilia (ca 1840). Very little else is known about his personal life.

== Gallery ==
Selected landscape paintings
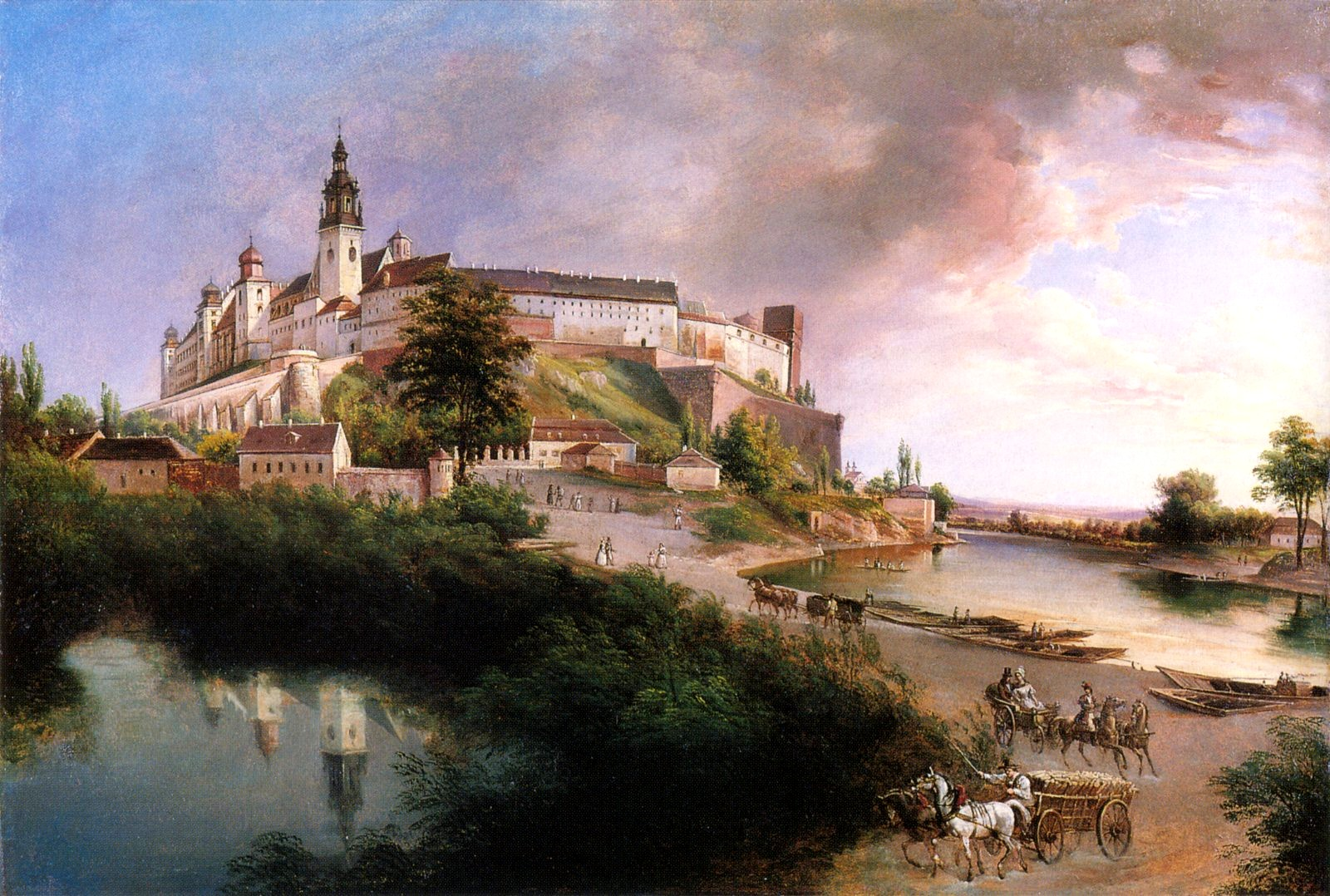
View of Wawel Castle in Kraków, Wawel Castle

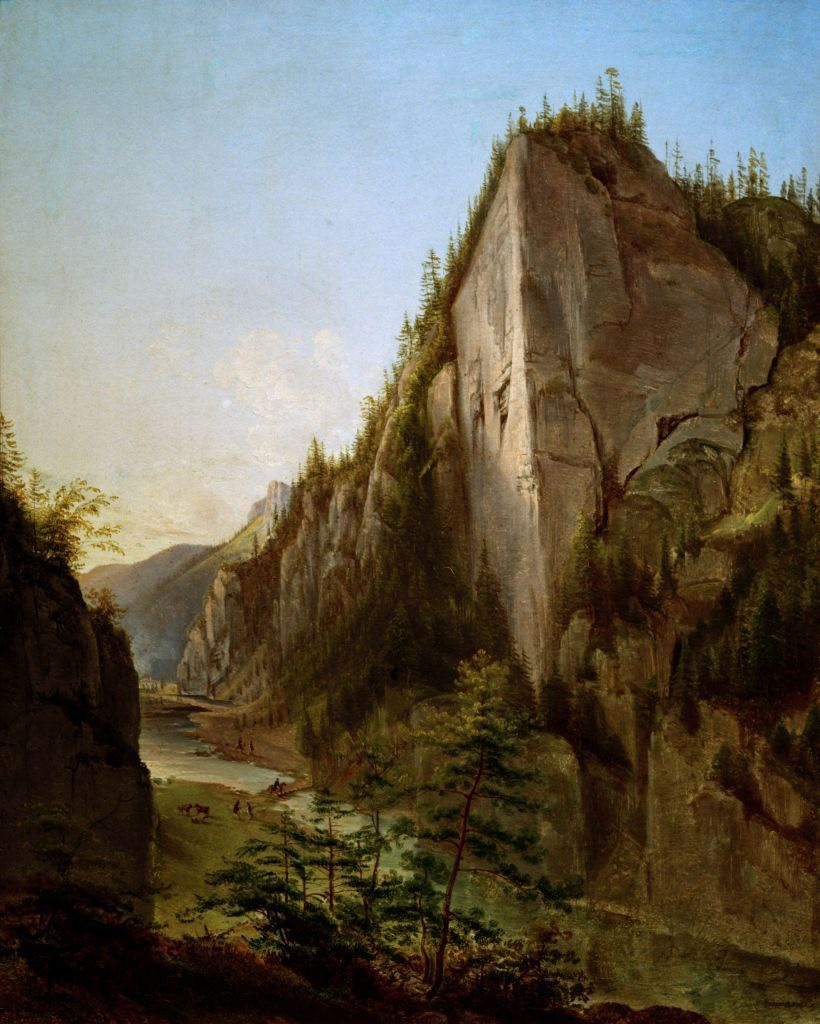
Dolina Kościeliska Valley, Tatras, National Museum in Wrocław

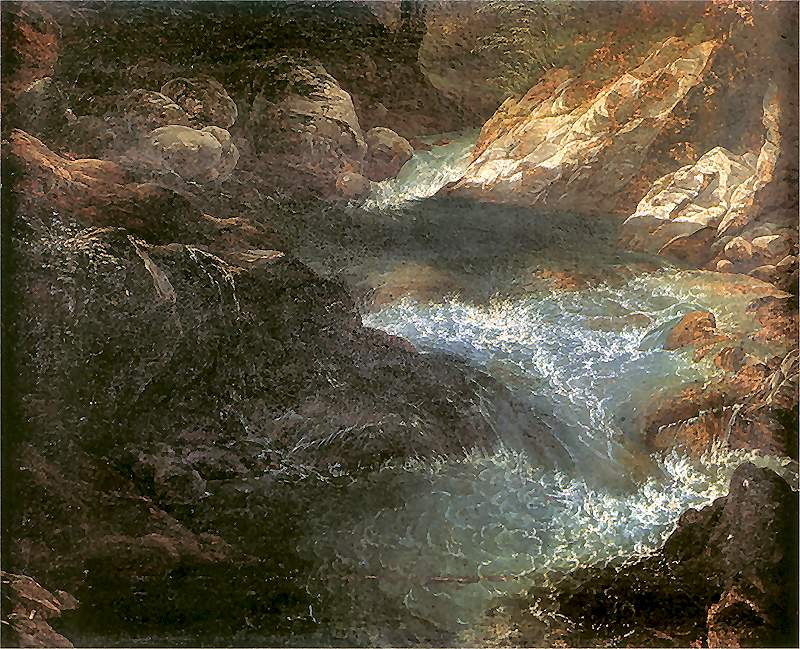
Potok górski (Mountain stream), Silesian Museum (Katowice)

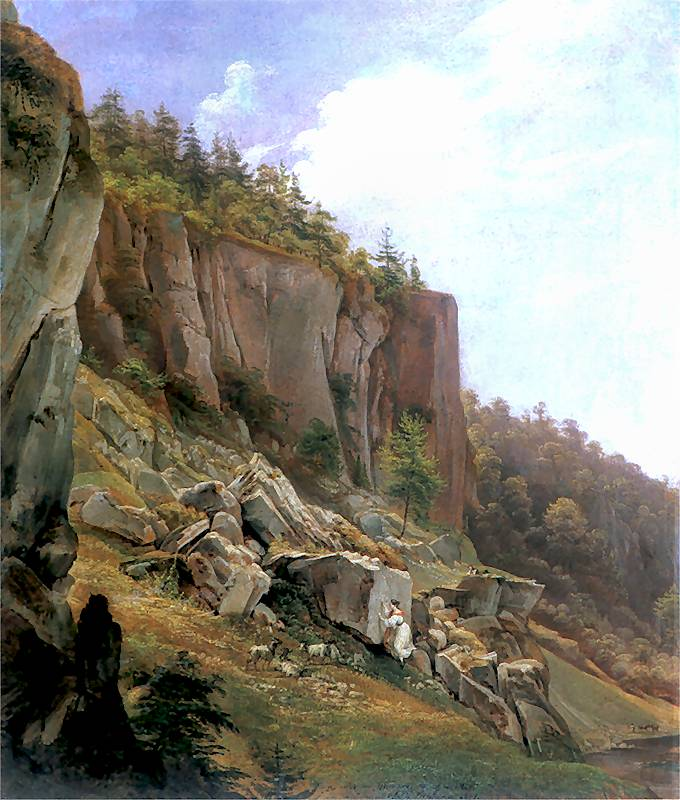
Krajobraz z Ojcowa, National Museum, Kraków

== Notes and references ==
Media related to Jan Nepomucen Głowacki at Wikimedia Commons
