= Stronie, Wadowice County =

Stronie
- Village
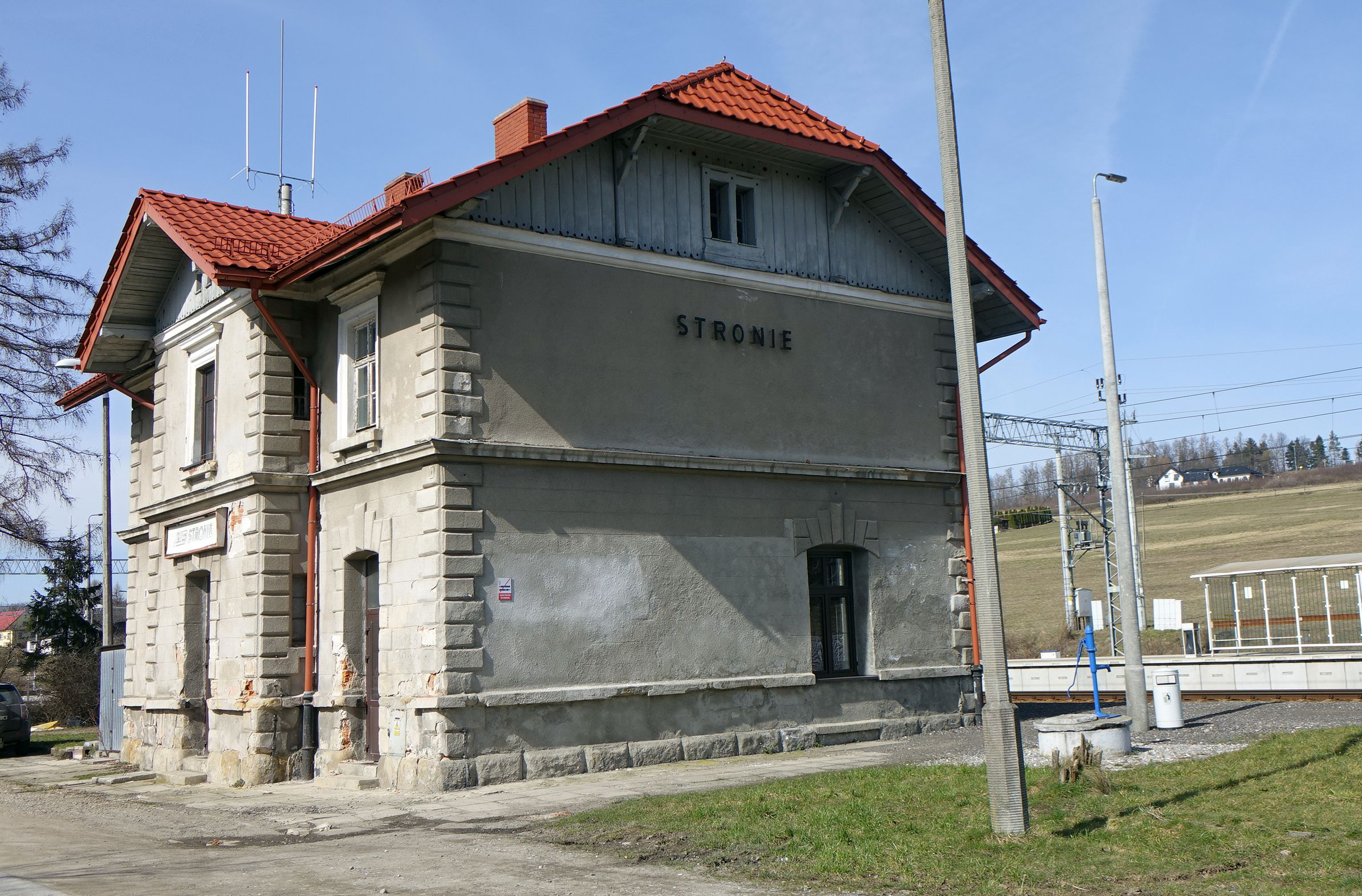
- Train station

- Location within Poland
- Coordinates: 49°50′N 19°40′E
- Country: Poland
- Voivodeship: Lesser Poland
- County: Wadowice
- Gmina: Stryszów
- Highest elevation: 460 m (1,510 ft)
- Lowest elevation: 420 m (1,380 ft)
- Population: 1,200

Stronie [ˈstrɔɲɛ] is a village in the administrative district of Gmina Stryszów, within Wadowice County, Lesser Poland Voivodeship, in southern Poland.
