= Wyźrał =

- Village
- Location within Poland
- Coordinates: 50°1′N 19°44′E
- Country: Poland
- Voivodeship: Lesser Poland
- County: Wadowice
- Gmina: Brzeźnica

Wyźrał [ˈvɨʑrau̯] is a village in the administrative district of Gmina Brzeźnica, within Wadowice County, Lesser Poland Voivodeship, in southern Poland.
