= Łękawica, Wadowice County =

Łękawica
- Village
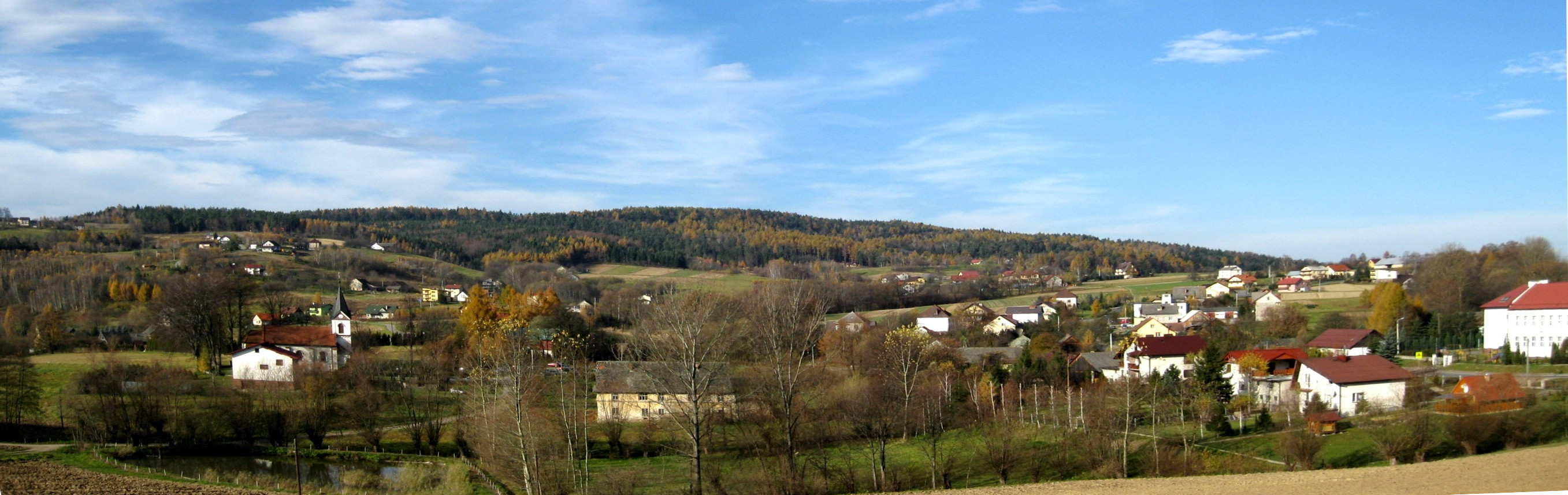

- Location within Poland
- Coordinates: 49°50′N 19°34′E
- Country: Poland
- Voivodeship: Lesser Poland
- County: Wadowice
- Gmina: Stryszów
- Highest elevation: 545 m (1,788 ft)
- Lowest elevation: 325 m (1,066 ft)
- Population: 1,200

Łękawica [wɛnkaˈvit͡sa] is a village in the administrative district of Gmina Stryszów, within Wadowice County, Lesser Poland Voivodeship, in southern Poland.
