= Bachorowice =

- Village
- Location within Poland
- Coordinates: 49°56′14″N 19°35′1″E
- Country: Poland
- Voivodeship: Lesser Poland
- County: Wadowice
- Gmina: Brzeźnica
- Population: 960

Bachorowice [baxɔrɔˈvit͡sɛ] is a village in the administrative district of Gmina Brzeźnica, within Wadowice County, Lesser Poland Voivodeship, in southern Poland.
