= Gmina Brzeźnica, Lesser Poland Voivodeship =

Gmina Brzeźnica Brzeźnica Commune
- Gmina
- Flag Coat of arms
- Interactive map of Gmina Brzeźnica
- Coordinates (Brzeźnica): 49°58′N 19°38′E
- Country: Poland
- Voivodeship: Lesser Poland
- County: Wadowice
- Seat: Brzeźnica

Area
  - Total: 66.3 km^{2} (25.6 sq mi)

Population (2006)
  - Total: 10,232
  - Density: 154/km^{2} (400/sq mi)
- Website: http://www.brzeznica.pl/

Gmina Brzeźnica is a rural gmina (administrative district) in Wadowice County, Lesser Poland Voivodeship, in southern Poland. Its seat is the village of Brzeźnica, which lies approximately 14 kilometres (9 mi) north-east of Wadowice and 25 km (16 mi) south-west of the regional capital Kraków.

The gmina covers an area of 66.3 square kilometres (25.6 sq mi), and as of 2006 its total population is 10,232.

== Villages ==
Gmina Brzeźnica contains the villages and settlements of Bachorowice, Bęczyn, Brzezinka, Brzeźnica, Chrząstowice, Kopytówka, Kossowa, Łączany, Marcyporęba, Nowe Dwory, Paszkówka, Sosnowice, Tłuczań and Wyźrał.

== Neighbouring gminas ==
Gmina Brzeźnica is bordered by the gminas of Czernichów, Kalwaria Zebrzydowska, Skawina, Spytkowice and Tomice.
