= Stryszów =

- Village
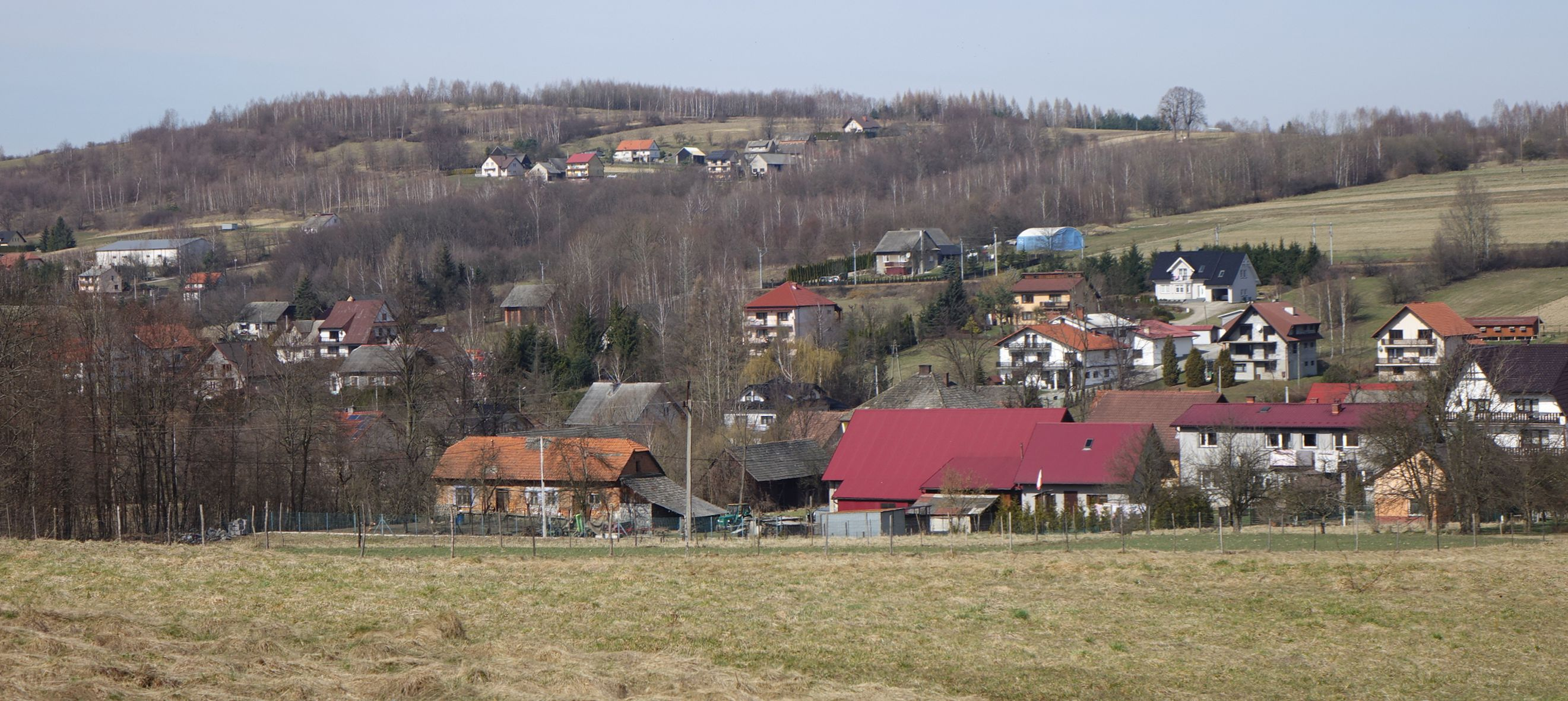

- Location within Poland
- Coordinates: 49°50′N 19°37′E
- Country: Poland
- Voivodeship: Lesser Poland
- County: Wadowice
- Gmina: Stryszów
- Population: 2,200

Stryszów [ˈstrɨʂuf] is a village in Wadowice County, Lesser Poland Voivodeship, in southern Poland. It is the seat of the gmina (administrative district) called Gmina Stryszów.
