= Bęczyn, Lesser Poland Voivodeship =

Bęczyn
- Village
- Location within Poland
- Coordinates: 49°56′7″N 19°39′36″E
- Country: Poland
- Voivodeship: Lesser Poland
- County: Wadowice
- Gmina: Brzeźnica

Bęczyn [ˈbɛnt͡ʂɨn] is a village in the administrative district of Gmina Brzeźnica, within Wadowice County, Lesser Poland Voivodeship, in southern Poland.
