= Zakrzów, Wadowice County =

Zakrzów
- Village
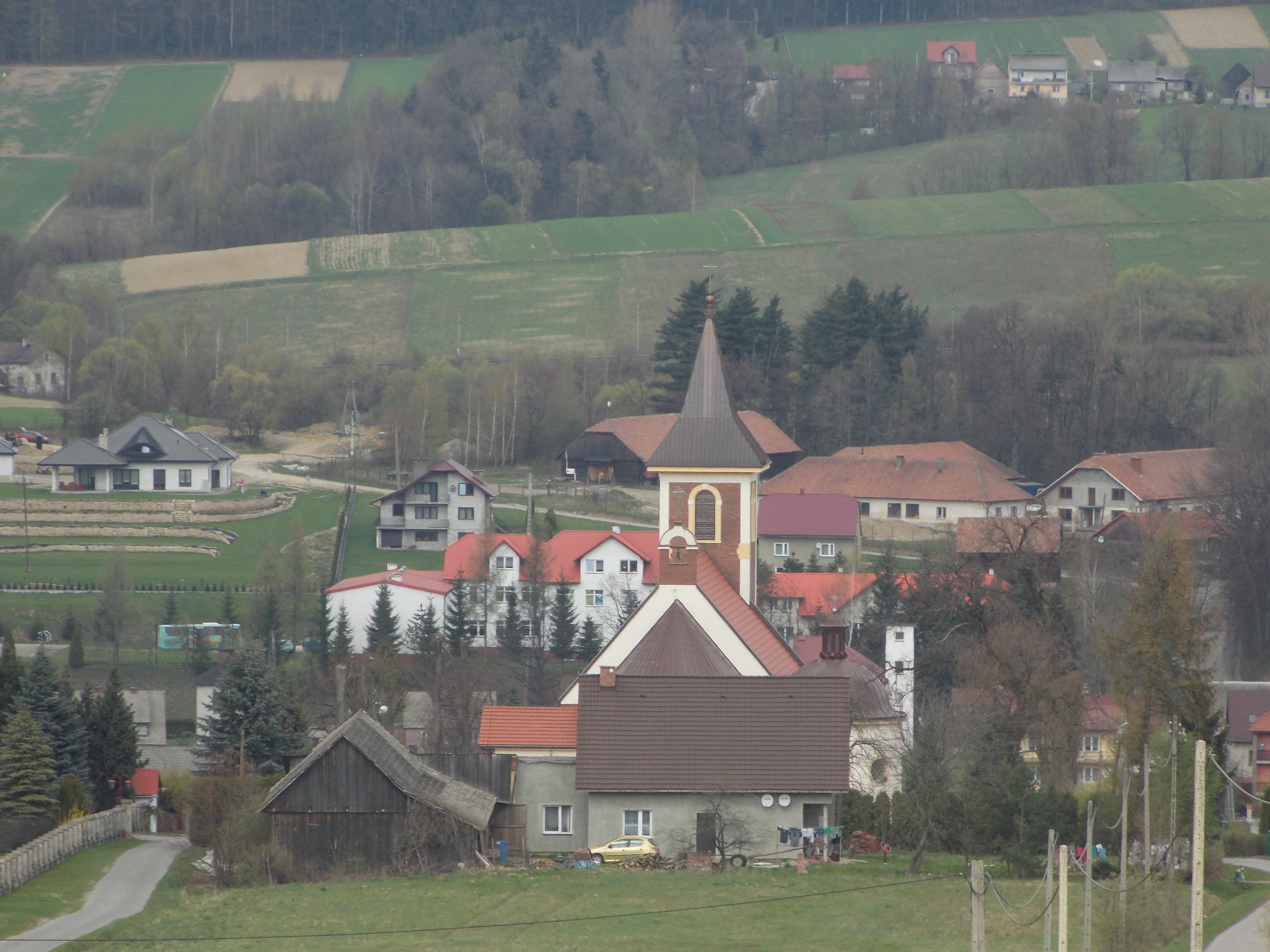

- Location within Poland
- Coordinates: 49°49′33″N 19°39′9″E
- Country: Poland
- Voivodeship: Lesser Poland
- County: Wadowice
- Gmina: Stryszów
- Population: 1,100

Zakrzów [ˈzakʂuf] is a village in the administrative district of Gmina Stryszów, within Wadowice County, Lesser Poland Voivodeship, in southern Poland.
