= Nowe Dwory, Lesser Poland Voivodeship =

Nowe Dwory
- Village
- Location within Poland
- Coordinates: 49°57′N 19°36′E
- Country: Poland
- Voivodeship: Lesser Poland
- County: Wadowice
- Gmina: Brzeźnica

Nowe Dwory [ˈnɔvɛ ˈdvɔrɨ] is a village in the administrative district of Gmina Brzeźnica, within Wadowice County, Lesser Poland Voivodeship, in southern Poland.
