= Franz Steinfeld =

Austrian artist (1787–1868)

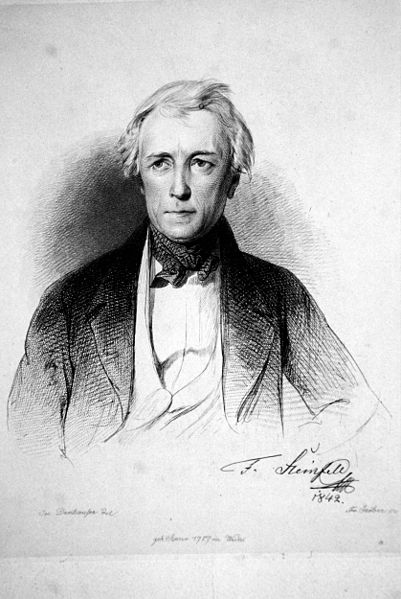
Franz Steinfeld; engraving by Franz Xaver Stöber (1842)

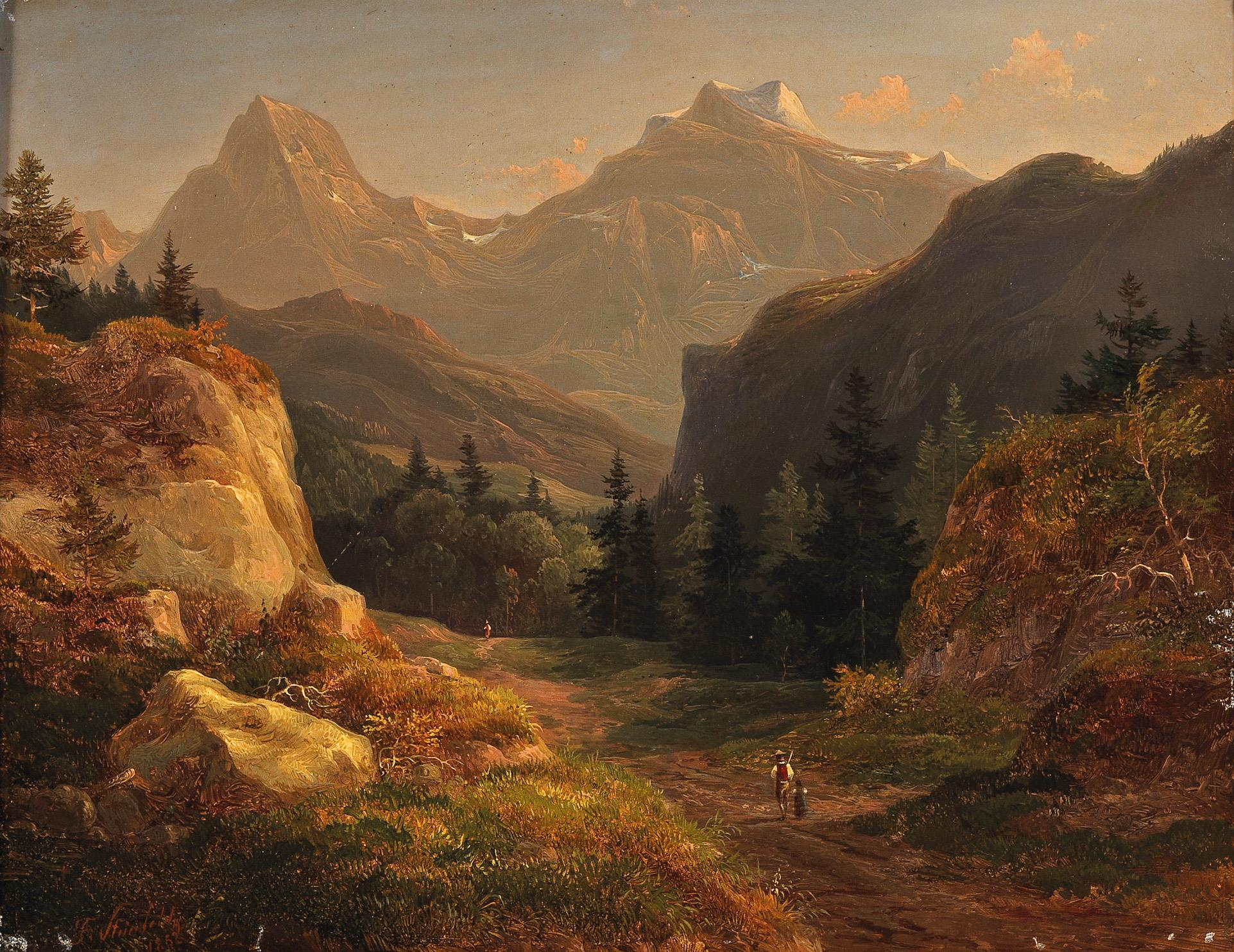
Landscape near Salzburg

Franz Steinfeld (26 March 1787 – 5 November 1868) was an Austrian landscape painter. He is often referred to as "The Younger", to distinguish him from his father, also named Franz (1750–1832), who was a sculptor.

== Life and work ==
Steifeld was born on 26 March 1787 in Vienna. He initially studied sculpting with his father but, at the suggestion of the engraver, Francesco Vasanova (1727–1802), he was enrolled at the Academy of Fine Arts, Vienna. There, he studied with Laurenz Janscha, Martin von Molitor and Albert Christoph Dies. In 1805, he went on a study trip to the Rheinlands and the Netherlands, where he was attracted to the works of Jacob van Ruisdael.

In 1815, he married Dorothea Fertbauer; from a family of artists. Her brother, Leopold (1802–1875), was a history painter. Their son, Wilhelm (1816–1854), also became an artist. From 1815 to 1835, Steinfeld served as a court painter for Archduke Anton Viktor.

His first exhibit at the academy came in 1822, and he was named a member the following year. He became a professor in 1845. As an instructor, he encouraged drawing and painting from nature ("en plein aire") and sought to have the windows at the academy enlarged to provide more light.

He made numerous trips throughout Italy, Germany and Switzerland, and an extended stay in Belgium with Josef Danhauser. He died during a visit to Bohemia on 5 November 1868 in Písek.

In 1901, a street in Vienna's Heiligenstadt district was named after him.

Although mostly a landscape painter, he also created etchings and lithographs. He was among the earliest painters to work in the Alps, and helped bring a more Classical approach to landscapes. He was also one of the first artists in that genre to introduce the Biedermeier style.

== Sources ==
- K. W. (1893). "Steinfeld, Franz". Allgemeine Deutsche Biographie (in German). Vol. 35. Leipzig: Duncker & Humblot. pp. 709–710.
- Werner Telesko: "Steinfeld, Franz d. J. (1787–1868), Maler". In: Österreichisches Biographisches Lexikon 1815–1950 (ÖBL). Vol. 13, Austrian Academy of Sciences, Vienna 2010, ISBN 978-3-7001-6963-5, p. 183.
- C. Wiesboeck: "Franz Steinfeld", Obituary. In: Zeitschriften (Archiv für die zeichnenden Künste mit besonderer Beziehung auf Kupferstecher- und Holzschneidekunst und ihre Geschichte) Vol.15. pg.102 ff.
- Sonja Menches: Franz Steinfeld (exhibition catalog), Giese und Schweiger, Vienna, 2016.
