= Bieńkowice, Wadowice County =

Bieńkowice
- Village
- Location within Poland
- Coordinates: 49°53′04″N 19°39′10″E
- Country: Poland
- Voivodeship: Lesser Poland
- County: Wadowice
- Gmina: Kalwaria Zebrzydowska

Bieńkowice [bjɛɲkɔˈvit͡sɛ] is a village in the administrative district of Gmina Kalwaria Zebrzydowska, within Wadowice County, Lesser Poland Voivodeship, in southern Poland.
