= Zastawiska =

- Village
- Location within Poland
- Coordinates: 49°53′57″N 19°38′21″E
- Country: Poland
- Voivodeship: Lesser Poland
- County: Wadowice
- Gmina: Kalwaria Zebrzydowska

Zastawiska is a village in the administrative district of Gmina Kalwaria Zebrzydowska, within Wadowice County, Lesser Poland Voivodeship, in southern Poland.
