= Łaśnica =

- Village
- Location within Poland
- Coordinates: 49°49′43″N 19°42′59″E
- Country: Poland
- Voivodeship: Lesser Poland
- County: Wadowice
- Gmina: Lanckorona

Łaśnica is a village in the administrative district of Gmina Lanckorona, within Wadowice County, Lesser Poland Voivodeship, in southern Poland.
