= Barwałd Górny =

- Village
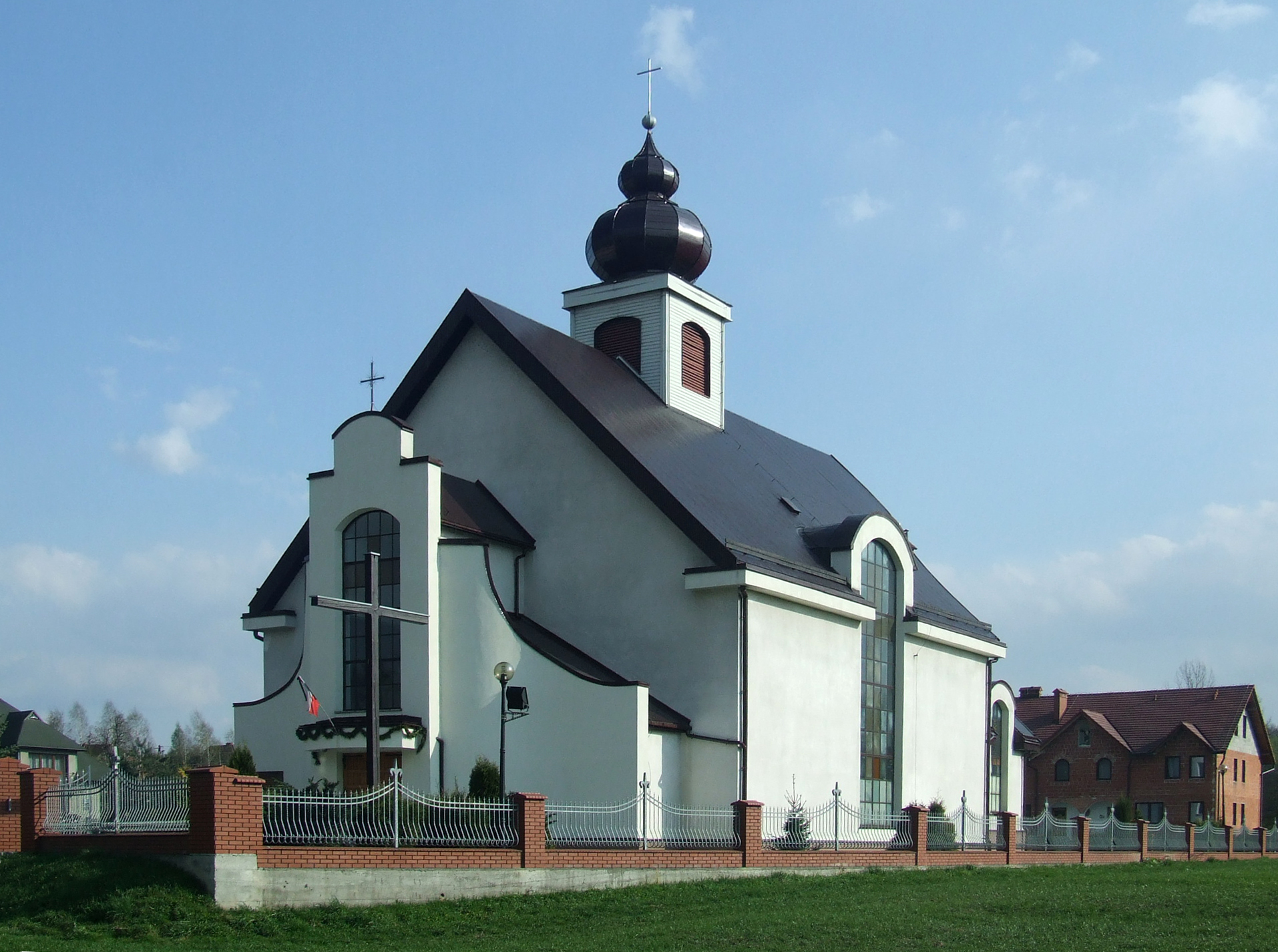
- Divine Mercy church

- Location within Poland
- Coordinates: 49°52′N 19°38′E
- Country: Poland
- Voivodeship: Lesser Poland
- County: Wadowice
- Gmina: Kalwaria Zebrzydowska
- Highest elevation: 340 m (1,120 ft)
- Lowest elevation: 280 m (920 ft)

Barwałd Górny (Polish pronunciation: [ˈbarvawd ˈɡurnɨ]) is a village in the administrative district of Gmina Kalwaria Zebrzydowska, within Wadowice County, Lesser Poland Voivodeship, in southern Poland.

The village was founded probably at the end of the thirteenth century. It was first mentioned in a written document in 1381 as the property of Sułek z [from] Barvalt, whose descendants would later be known as Barwałdzcy. In the sixteenth century, the village Barwałd was subdivided into three parts: Barwałd Górny (Upper), Barwałd Średni (Middle) and Barwałd Dolny (Lower). In 1540, the village was bought by king Sigismund I the Old and incorporated into the Royal Zator. The Zatorscy governors used the local people to cut wood, which was then sent to Zator. From the sixteenth century, the village belonged to Szaczowscy family, then Russoccy, then the Porębscy in the seventeenth century, and the Gołuchowscy in the eighteenth/nineteenth century. On the outskirts of the forest in the village, the Wallachian population incarcerated at the turn of the sixteenth and seventeenth century Tartar captives, Cossack and Russian. Starosta barwałdzki Wierzbowski Hermione told the local population to pay the rent, instead of being in serfdom to the castle in Zator. In 1665, Janowski Bębnowski displaced the local peasants from their land and assuming it as his own farm.

The construction of the railway took place in 1888 with a route through the center of the village where a railway station was opened. On 24 November 1944 a passenger train from Zakopane to Kraków collided with a German freight train, killing at least 130 people. In 1945 the Blotniccy family's mansion was demolished.

An antique wooden chapel hermitage of Saint Rosalie is located in Barwałd Górny, probably dating from the mid-eighteenth century. It consists of two chapels of St. Rosalie and St. Mary Magdalene and the cell-hermitage. Inside are a baroque altar of Our Lady and of St. Rosalie, there are two baroque paintings of 1747 of Christmas and the Adoration of the Magi, and also a nineteenth-century votive images related to the Passion Mysteries showing pilgrims on their pilgrimage to the sanctuary of Kalwaria Zebrzydowska.
