= Brody, Lesser Poland Voivodeship =

Brody
- Village
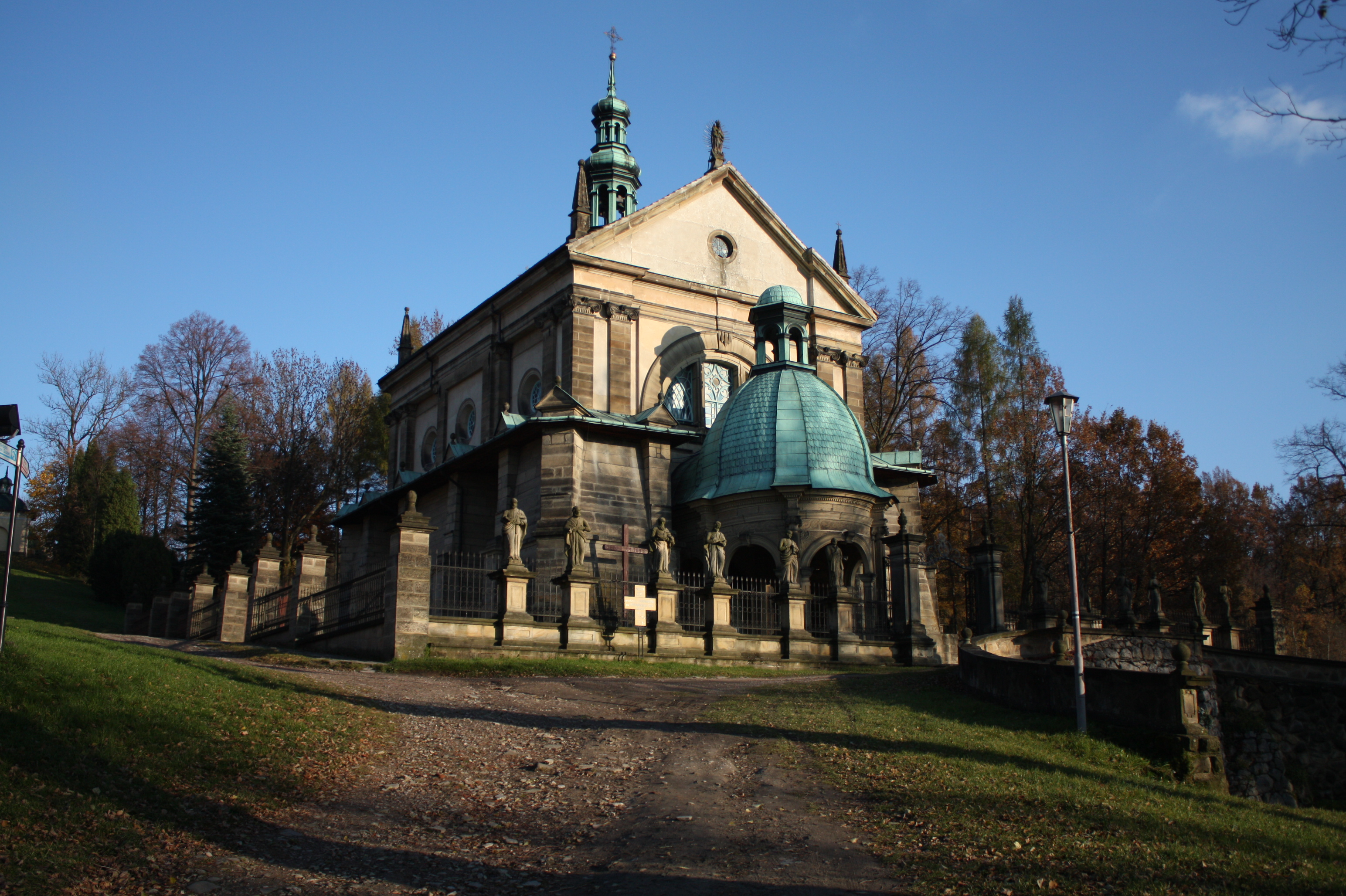
- St. Mary church

- Location within Poland
- Coordinates: 49°51′57″N 19°41′51″E
- Country: Poland
- Voivodeship: Lesser Poland
- County: Wadowice
- Gmina: Kalwaria Zebrzydowska
- Highest elevation: 340 m (1,120 ft)
- Lowest elevation: 290 m (950 ft)
- Population: 2,500

Brody [ˈbrɔdɨ] is a village in the administrative district of Gmina Kalwaria Zebrzydowska, within Wadowice County, Lesser Poland Voivodeship, in southern Poland.
