= Antoni Banaś =

Polish lawyer, judge, and politician (1873–1936)

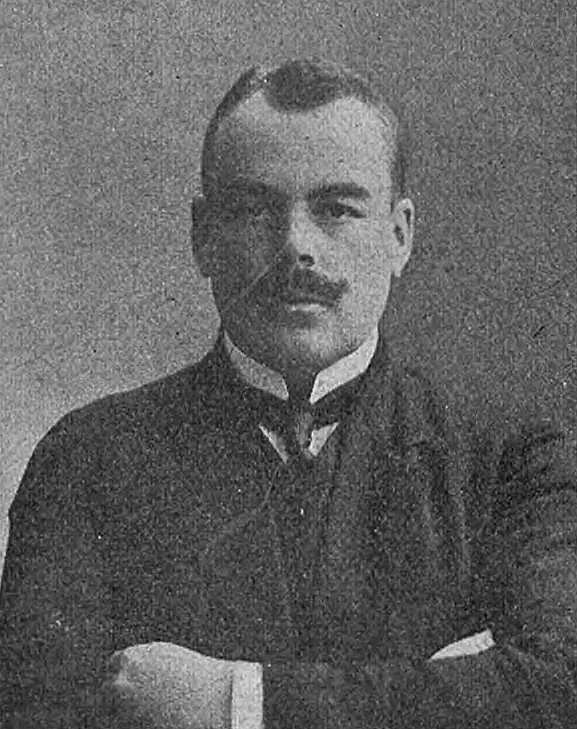
- Antoni Banaś (before 1911)

Member of the Austrian Imperial Council
- In office 17 July 1911 – 28 October 1918
- Constituency: District No. 37 (Wadowice–Skawina)

Personal details
- Born: 11 June 1873 Kalwaria Zebrzydowska, Austria-Hungary
- Died: 30 June 1936 Radocza, Second Polish Republic
- Party: Polish People's Party (1895–1913)|Polish People's Party (from 1908); Polish People's Party "Piast" (from 1913)
- Spouse: Zofia Sterkowicz
- Children: 4 sons (incl. Stanisław, Witold, Jan, Jerzy), 1 daughter
- Education: Jagiellonian University
- Occupation: Lawyer, politician

Military service
- Branch/service: Austro-Hungarian Army
- Years of service: 1914–1916
- Rank: Lieutenant Colonel-Auditor

Antoni Banaś (11 June 1873 – 30 June 1936) was a Polish lawyer, judge, and politician who served as a deputy to the Austrian Imperial Council (Reichsrat) between 1911 and 1918. He represented the Polish People's Party (Polskie Stronnictwo Ludowe, PSL) and was a member of the Polish Club (Polenklub), a parliamentary caucus uniting Polish deputies within the Austro-Hungarian legislature.

== Early life and education ==
Banaś was born on 11 June 1873 in Kalwaria Zebrzydowska, then part of Austrian Galicia. He completed secondary school at the Jan Sobieski Gymnasium in Kraków and studied law at Jagiellonian University, earning a Doctor of Law degree in 1902.

== Legal career ==
Banaś began his legal career in 1898 as a judicial trainee (auskultant) and later served as a judge in Kalwaria Zebrzydowska, Myślenice, and Wadowice. In 1916, he was appointed Landesgerichtsrat (provincial court councillor). During World War I, he served in the Austro-Hungarian military judiciary as an Oberleutnant-Auditor (First Lieutenant–Auditor) attached to the Kraków garrison's field court.

== Parliamentary service ==
In the 1911 elections to the Reichsrat, Banaś was elected as a deputy representing Galician District No. 37 (Wadowice region). He joined the Polish People's Party and later aligned with its “Piast” faction, which promoted agrarian reform and Polish autonomy. He served until the collapse of the Austro-Hungarian Empire in 1918.

== Estate management and later life ==
Outside of public service, Banaś was the proprietor of the Radocza estate near Wadowice. The estate included farmland, orchards, and fish ponds. He promoted local economic development, including rural handicrafts. Following World War I, he continued to reside at the estate until his death.

== Personal life ==
He was married to Zofia Sterkowicz, and the couple had six children. He died on 30 June 1936 and is buried in Radocza.

== See also ==
- Polish People's Party (Galicia)
- Reichsrat (Austria)
- Galicia (Eastern Europe)
