= Zarzyce Wielkie =

- Village
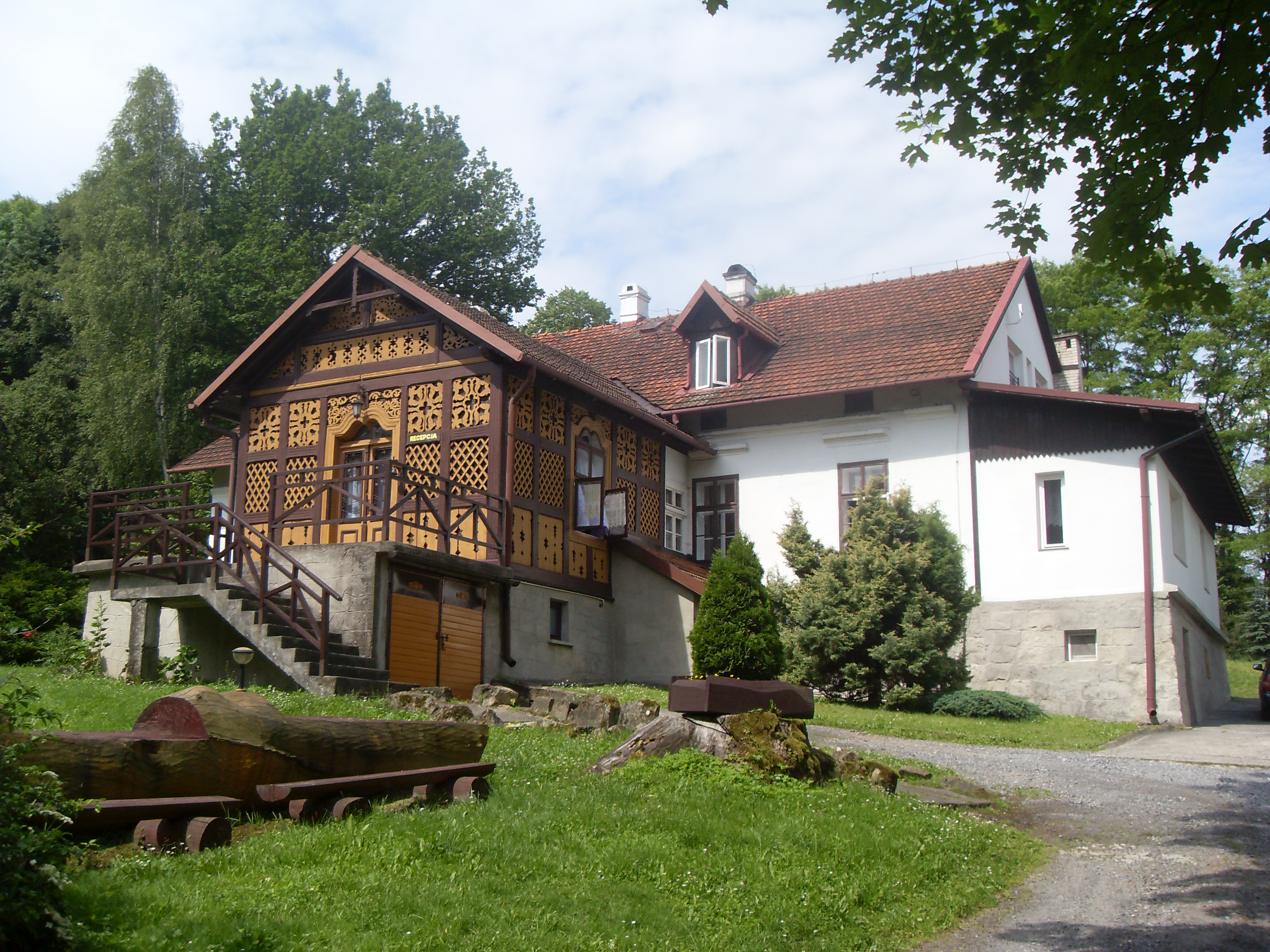
- Manor house in Zarzyce Wielkie

- Location within Poland
- Coordinates: 49°53′N 19°44′E
- Country: Poland
- Voivodeship: Lesser Poland
- County: Wadowice
- Gmina: Kalwaria Zebrzydowska
- Elevation: 250 m (820 ft)

Zarzyce Wielkie [zaˈʐɨt͡sɛ ˈvjɛlkʲɛ] is a village in the administrative district of Gmina Kalwaria Zebrzydowska, within Wadowice County, Lesser Poland Voivodeship, in southern Poland.
