= Zarzyce Małe =

- Village
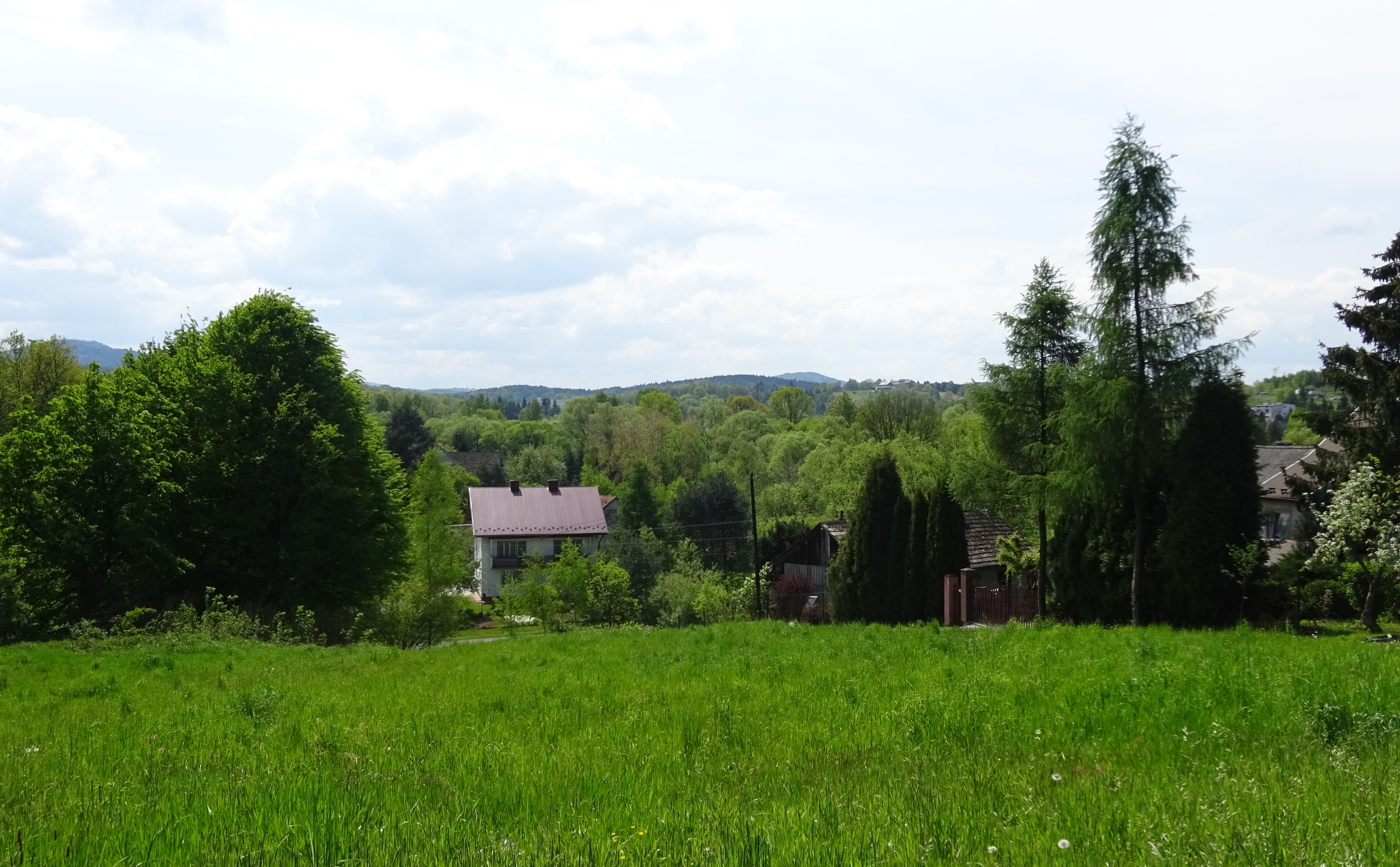

- Location within Poland
- Coordinates: 49°53′35″N 19°45′07″E
- Country: Poland
- Voivodeship: Lesser Poland
- County: Wadowice
- Gmina: Kalwaria Zebrzydowska
- Elevation: 250 m (820 ft)

Zarzyce Małe [zaˈʐɨt͡sɛ ˈmawɛ] is a village in the administrative district of Gmina Kalwaria Zebrzydowska, within Wadowice County, Lesser Poland Voivodeship, in southern Poland.
