= Gierałtowiczki =

- Village
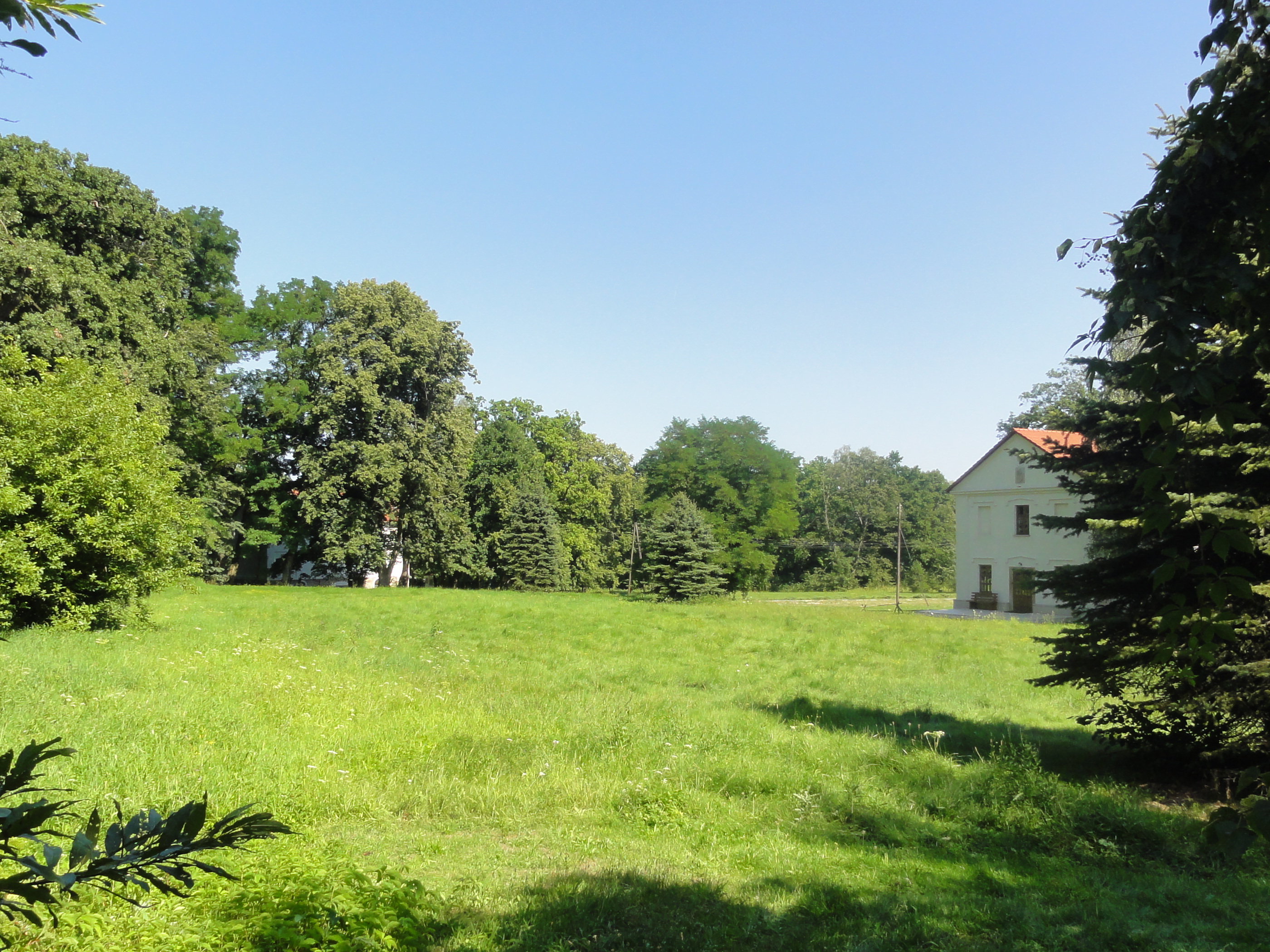

- Location within Poland
- Coordinates: 49°57′N 19°23′E
- Country: Poland
- Voivodeship: Lesser Poland
- County: Wadowice
- Gmina: Wieprz
- Population: 460

Gierałtowiczki [ɡʲɛrau̯tɔˈvit͡ʂki] is a village in the administrative district of Gmina Wieprz, within Wadowice County, Lesser Poland Voivodeship, in southern Poland.
