= Gierałtowice, Lesser Poland Voivodeship =

Gierałtowice
- Village
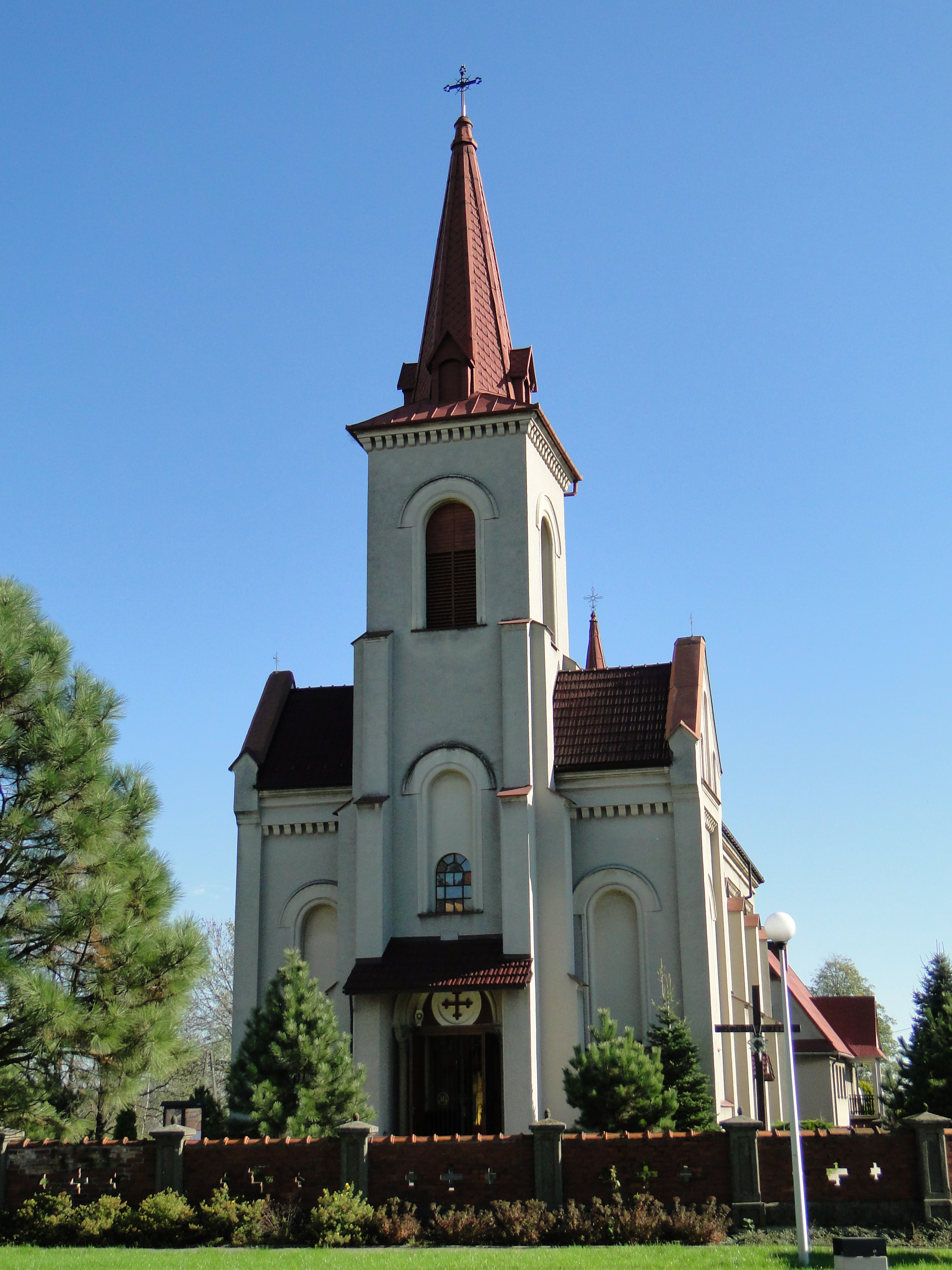
- Catholic church

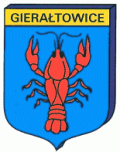
- Coat of arms

- Location within Poland
- Coordinates: 49°56′N 19°24′E
- Country: Poland
- Voivodeship: Lesser Poland
- County: Wadowice
- Gmina: Wieprz
- Elevation: 265 m (869 ft)
- Population: 1,252

Gierałtowice [ɡʲɛrau̯tɔˈvit͡sɛ] is a village in the administrative district of Gmina Wieprz, within Wadowice County, Lesser Poland Voivodeship, in southern Poland.
