= Przybradz =

- Village
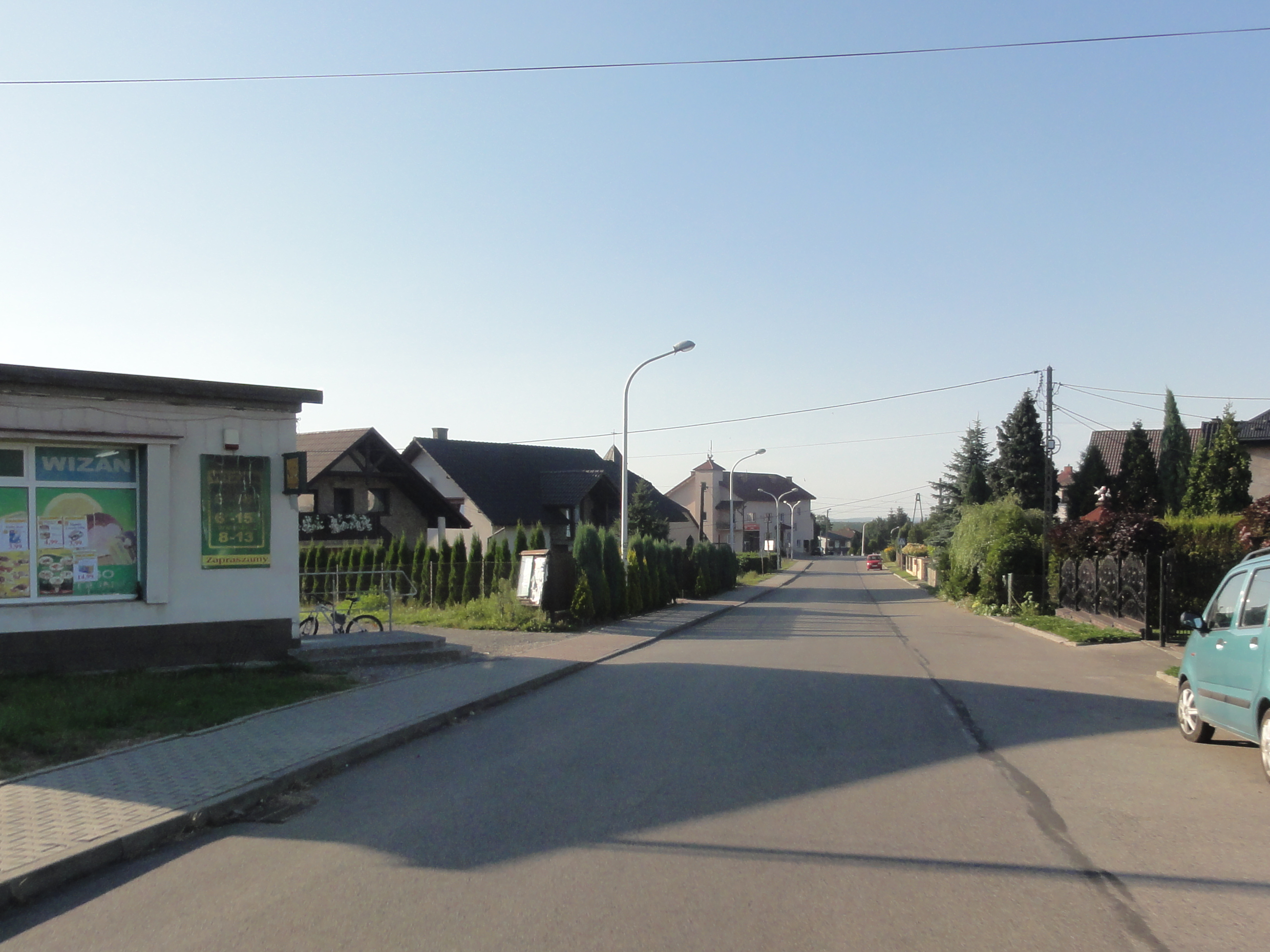
- Center of the village

- Location within Poland
- Coordinates: 49°57′N 19°25′E
- Country: Poland
- Voivodeship: Lesser Poland
- County: Wadowice
- Gmina: Wieprz
- Elevation: 250 m (820 ft)
- Population: 949

Przybradz [ˈpʂɨbrat͡s] is a village in the administrative district of Gmina Wieprz, within Wadowice County, Lesser Poland Voivodeship, in southern Poland.
