= Lgota, Wadowice County =

Lgota
- Village
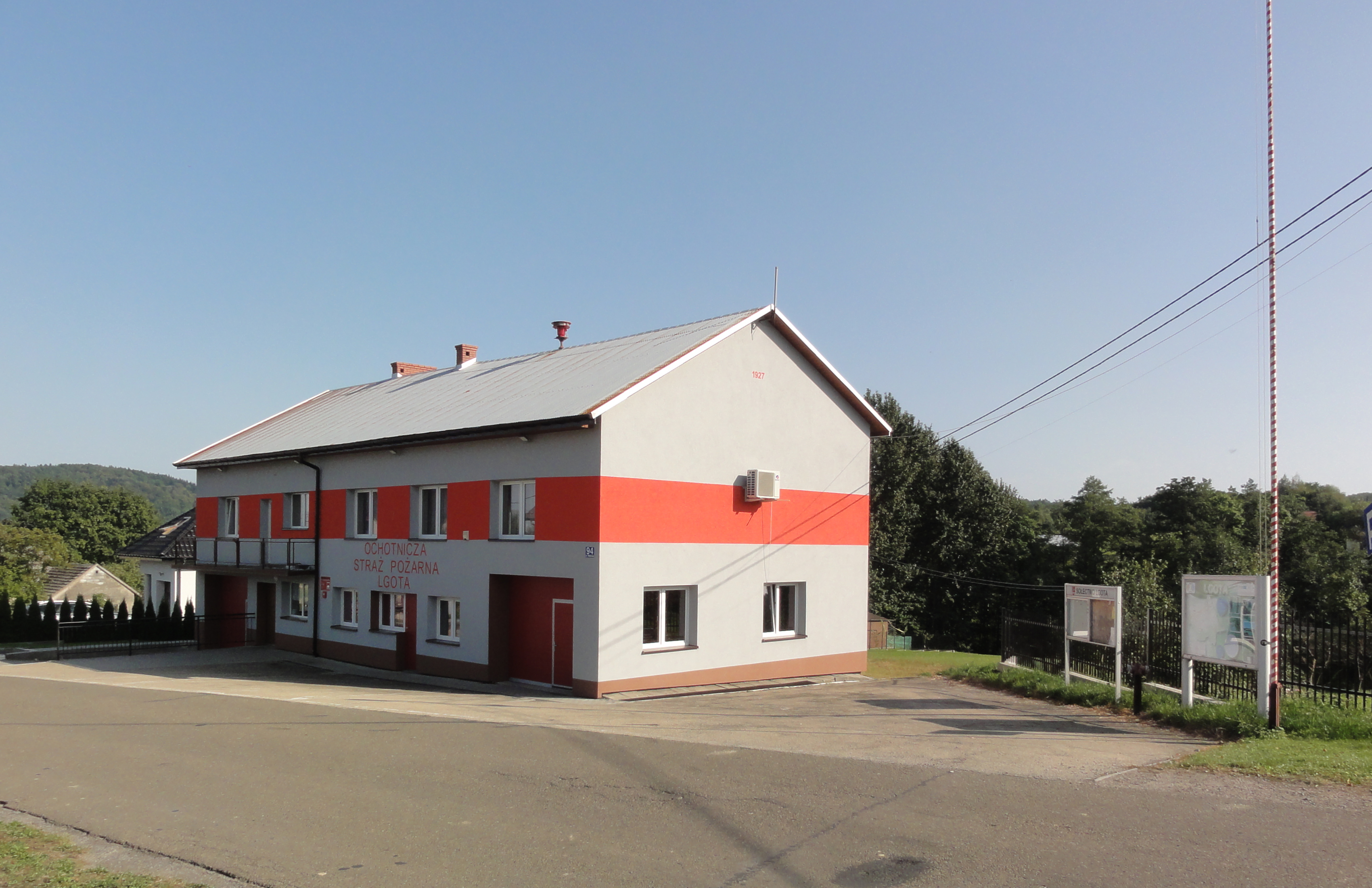
- Fire station

- Location within Poland
- Coordinates: 49°56′N 19°34′E
- Country: Poland
- Voivodeship: Lesser Poland
- County: Wadowice
- Gmina: Tomice
- Population: 429

Lgota [ˈlɡɔta] is a village in the administrative district of Gmina Tomice, within Wadowice County, Lesser Poland Voivodeship, in southern Poland.
