= Podolany, Wadowice County =

Podolany
- Village
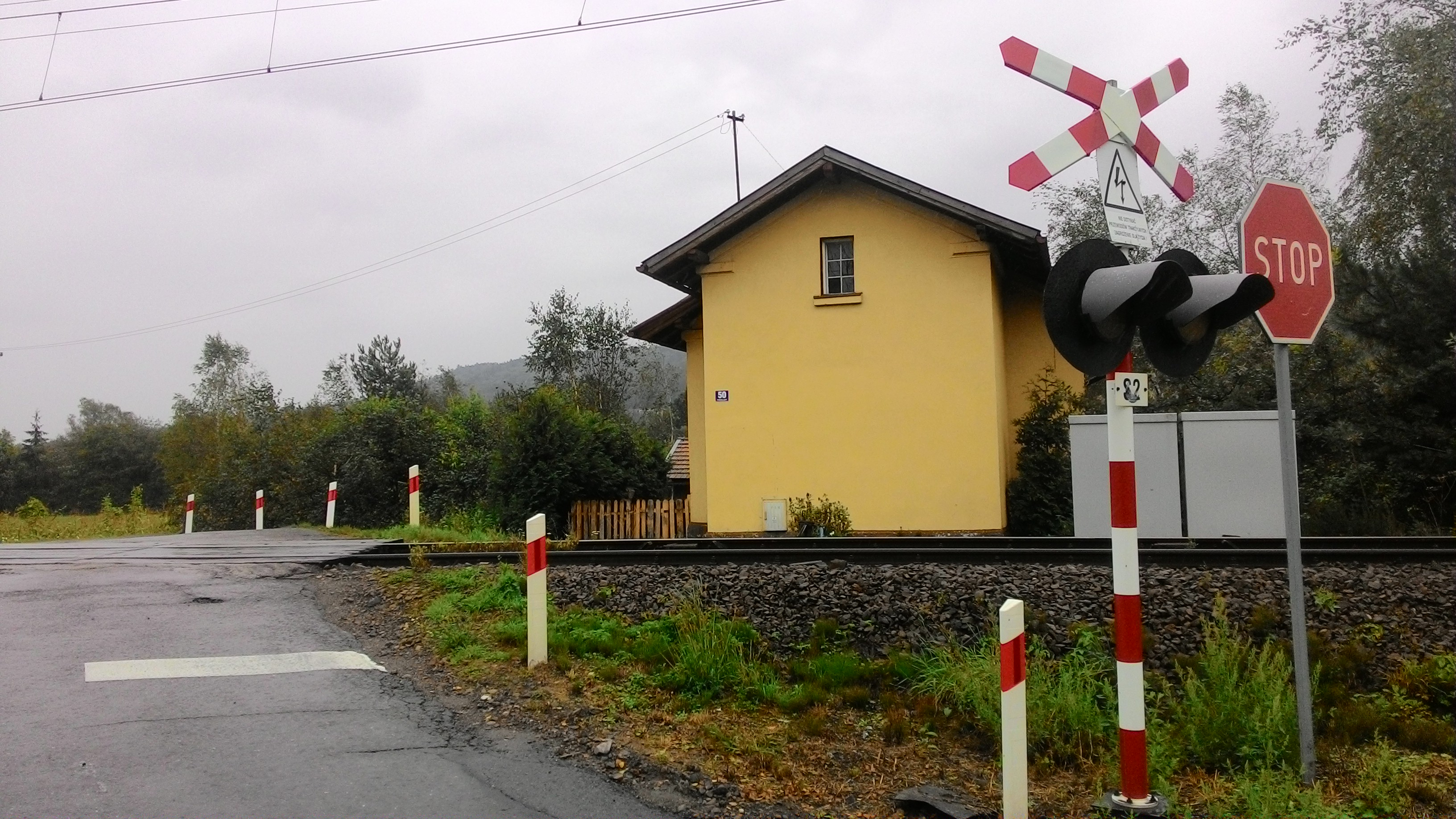
- Level crossing

- Location within Poland
- Coordinates: 49°55′N 19°46′E
- Country: Poland
- Voivodeship: Lesser Poland
- County: Wadowice
- Gmina: Kalwaria Zebrzydowska

Podolany [pɔdɔˈlanɨ] is a village in the administrative district of Gmina Kalwaria Zebrzydowska, within Wadowice County, Lesser Poland Voivodeship, in southern Poland.
