= Witanowice, Lesser Poland Voivodeship =

Witanowice
- Village
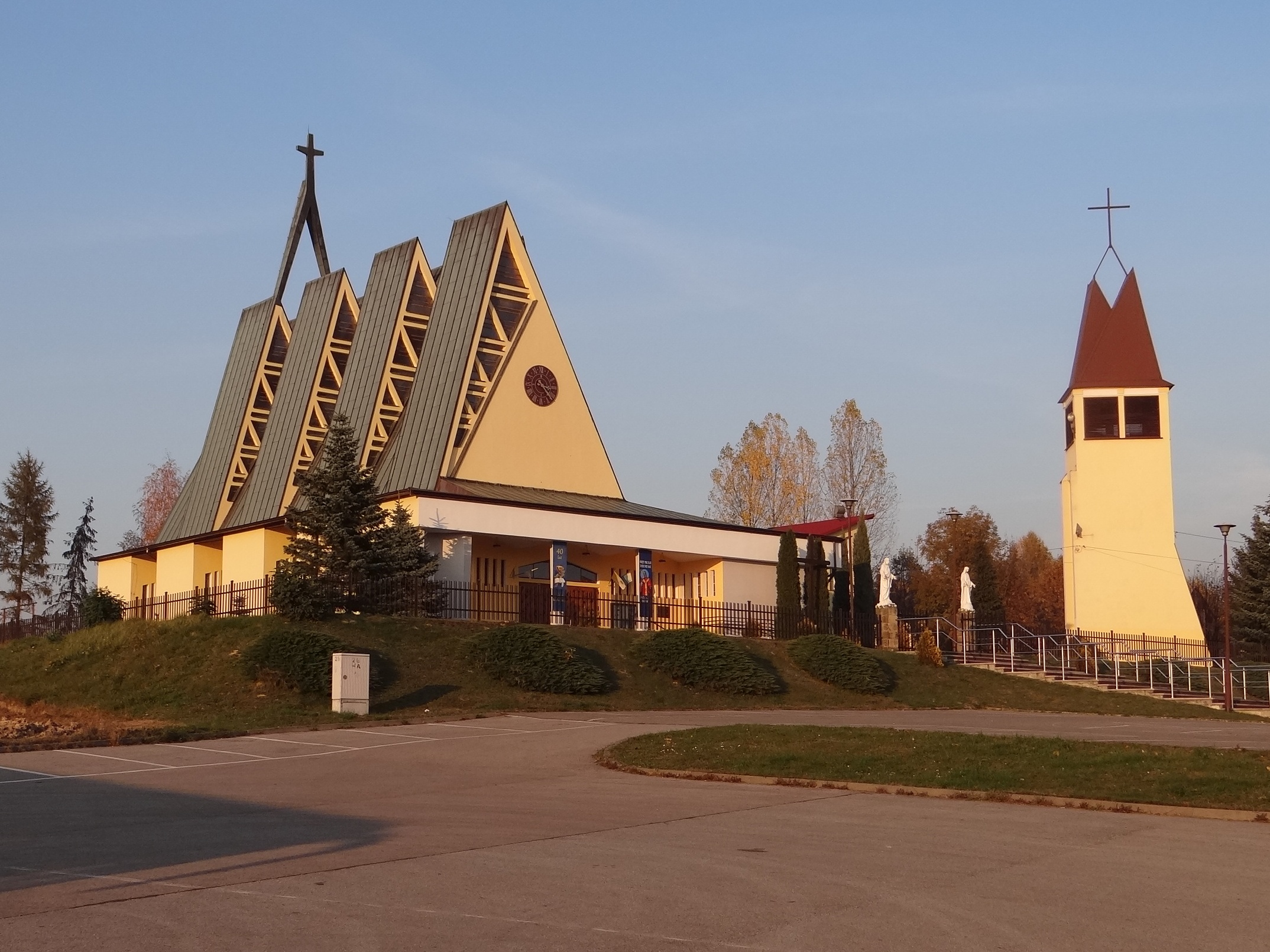
- Church in Witanowice

- Location within Poland
- Coordinates: 49°56′N 19°33′E
- Country: Poland
- Voivodeship: Lesser Poland
- County: Wadowice
- Gmina: Tomice
- Elevation: 300 m (980 ft)

Population
  - Total: 1,162

Witanowice [vitanɔˈvit͡sɛ] is a village in the administrative district of Gmina Tomice, within Wadowice County, Lesser Poland Voivodeship, in southern Poland.
