= Leńcze =

- Village
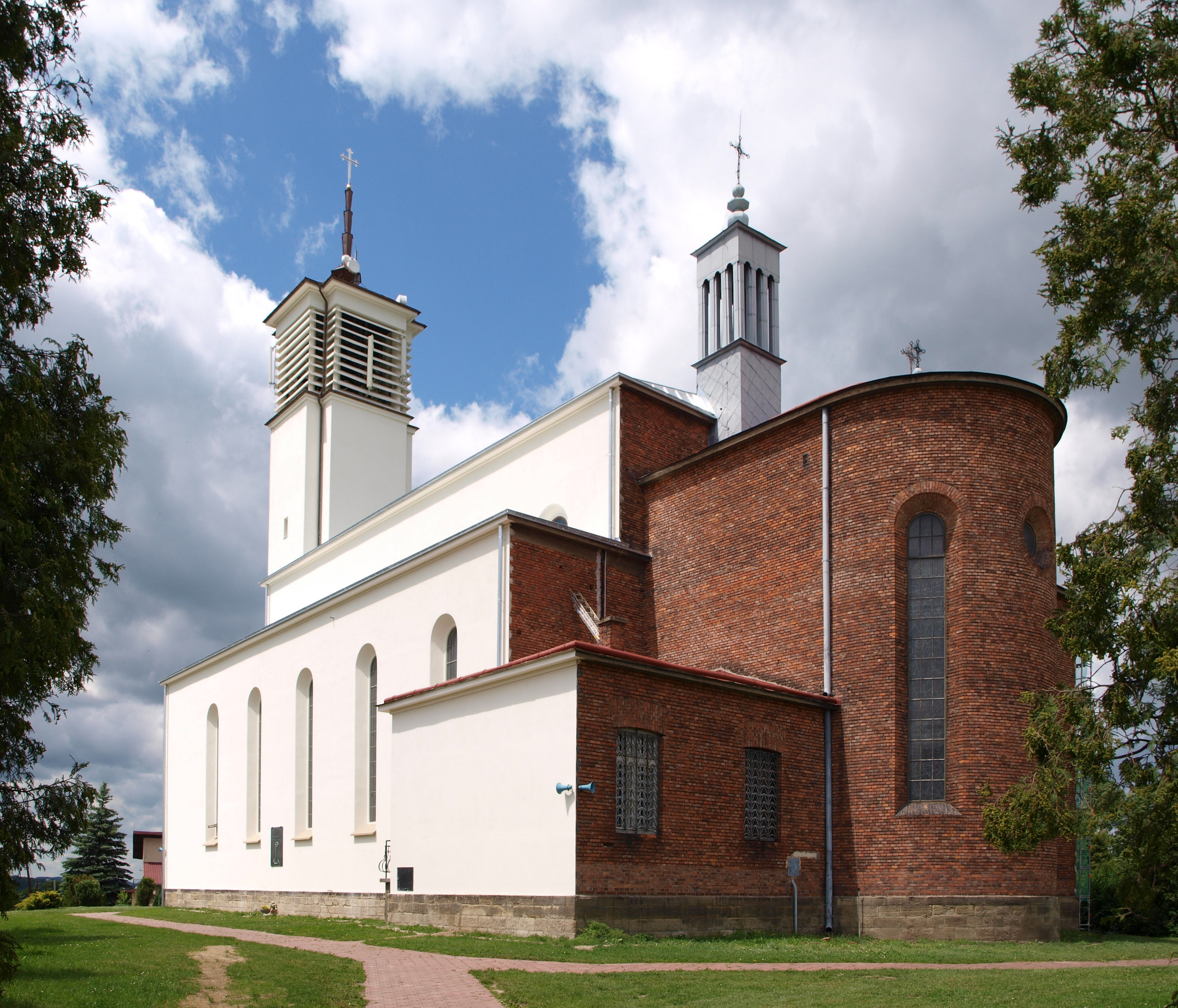
- Saints Peter and Paul Church (2009)

- Location within Poland
- Coordinates: 49°54′N 19°43′E
- Country: Poland
- Voivodeship: Lesser Poland
- County: Wadowice
- Gmina: Kalwaria Zebrzydowska
- Elevation: 475 m (1,558 ft)
- Population (2006): 1,408

Leńcze [ˈlɛɲt͡ʂɛ] is a village in the administrative district of Gmina Kalwaria Zebrzydowska, within Wadowice County, Lesser Poland Voivodeship, in southern Poland.
