= Frydrychowice =

- Village
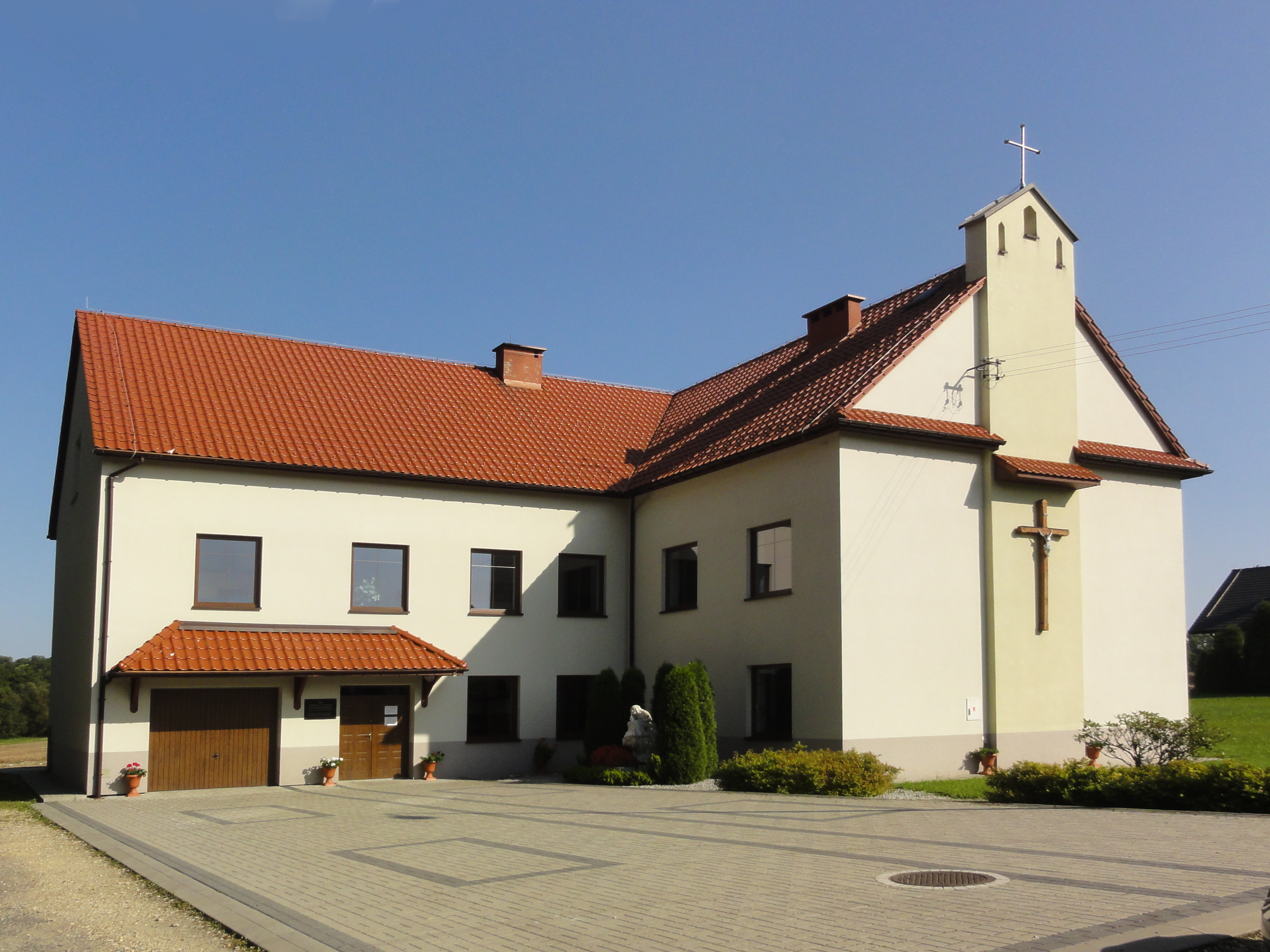
- Chapel and a museum

- Location within Poland
- Coordinates: 49°55′N 19°26′E
- Country: Poland
- Voivodeship: Lesser Poland
- County: Wadowice
- Gmina: Wieprz
- Highest elevation: 350 m (1,150 ft)
- Lowest elevation: 260 m (850 ft)
- Population: 2,799

Frydrychowice [frɨdrɨxɔˈvit͡sɛ] is a village in the administrative district of Gmina Wieprz, within Wadowice County, Lesser Poland Voivodeship, in southern Poland.
