= Nidek =

- Village
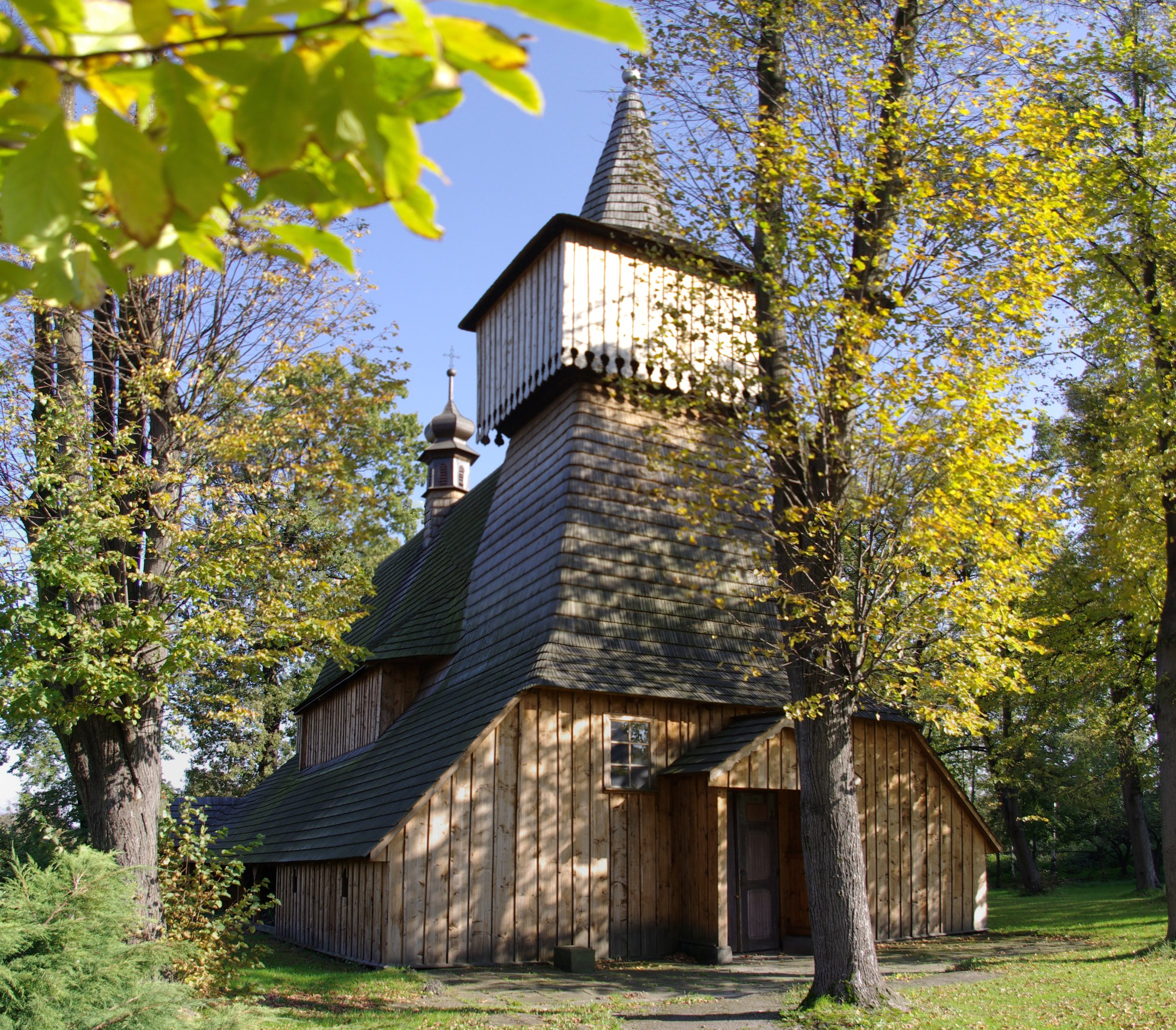
- Saint Simon and Saint Jude Thaddeus the Apostles Church

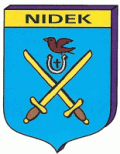
- Coat of arms

- Location within Poland
- Coordinates: 49°55′N 19°20′E
- Country: Poland
- Voivodeship: Lesser Poland
- County: Wadowice
- Gmina: Wieprz
- First mentioned: 1313
- Highest elevation: 350 m (1,150 ft)
- Lowest elevation: 265 m (869 ft)
- Population: 1,339

Nidek [ˈnidɛk] is a village in the administrative district of Gmina Wieprz, within Wadowice County, Lesser Poland Voivodeship, in southern Poland.

== History ==
The village was first mentioned in 1313 when a local parish church has been erected.

Politically the village belonged then to the Duchy of Oświęcim, formed in 1315 in the process of feudal fragmentation of Poland and was ruled by a local branch of Piast dynasty. In 1327, the duchy became a fee of the Kingdom of Bohemia. In 1457, Jan IV of Oświęcim agreed to sell the duchy to the Polish Crown, and in the accompanying document issued on 21 February the village was mentioned as Nydek.

The territory of the Duchy of Oświęcim was eventually incorporated into Poland in 1564 and formed Silesian County of Kraków Voivodeship. Upon the First Partition of Poland in 1772, it became part of the Austrian Kingdom of Galicia. After World War I and fall of Austria-Hungary, it became part of Poland. It was annexed by Nazi Germany at the beginning of World War II, and afterwards it was restored to Poland.
