= Podchybie, Wadowice County =

Podchybie
- Village
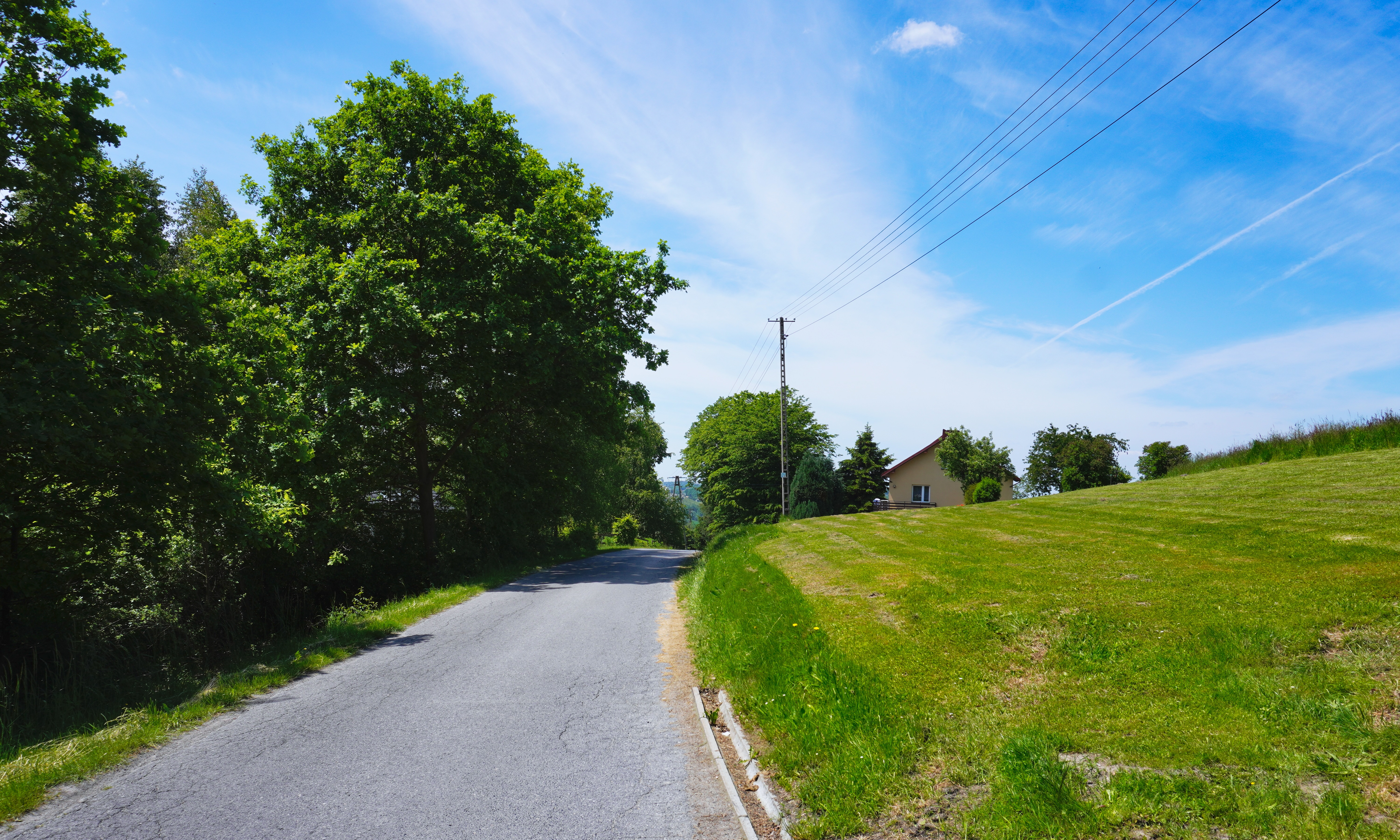

- Location within Poland
- Coordinates: 49°54′N 19°47′E
- Country: Poland
- Voivodeship: Lesser Poland
- County: Wadowice
- Gmina: Lanckorona
- Elevation: 280 m (920 ft)

Podchybie [pɔtˈxɨbjɛ] is a village in the administrative district of Gmina Lanckorona, within Wadowice County, Lesser Poland Voivodeship, in southern Poland.
