= Woźniki, Lesser Poland Voivodeship =

Woźniki
- Village
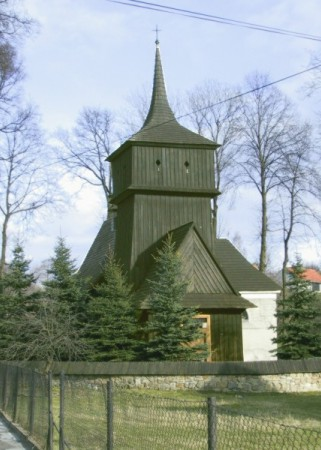
- Church of the Assumption

- Location within Poland
- Coordinates: 49°56′14.6″N 19°29′28.6″E
- Country: Poland
- Voivodeship: Lesser Poland
- County: Wadowice
- Gmina: Tomice

Population
  - Total: 1,213

Woźniki [vɔʑˈniki] is a village in the administrative district of Gmina Tomice, within Wadowice County, Lesser Poland Voivodeship, in southern Poland.
