= Skawinki =

- Village
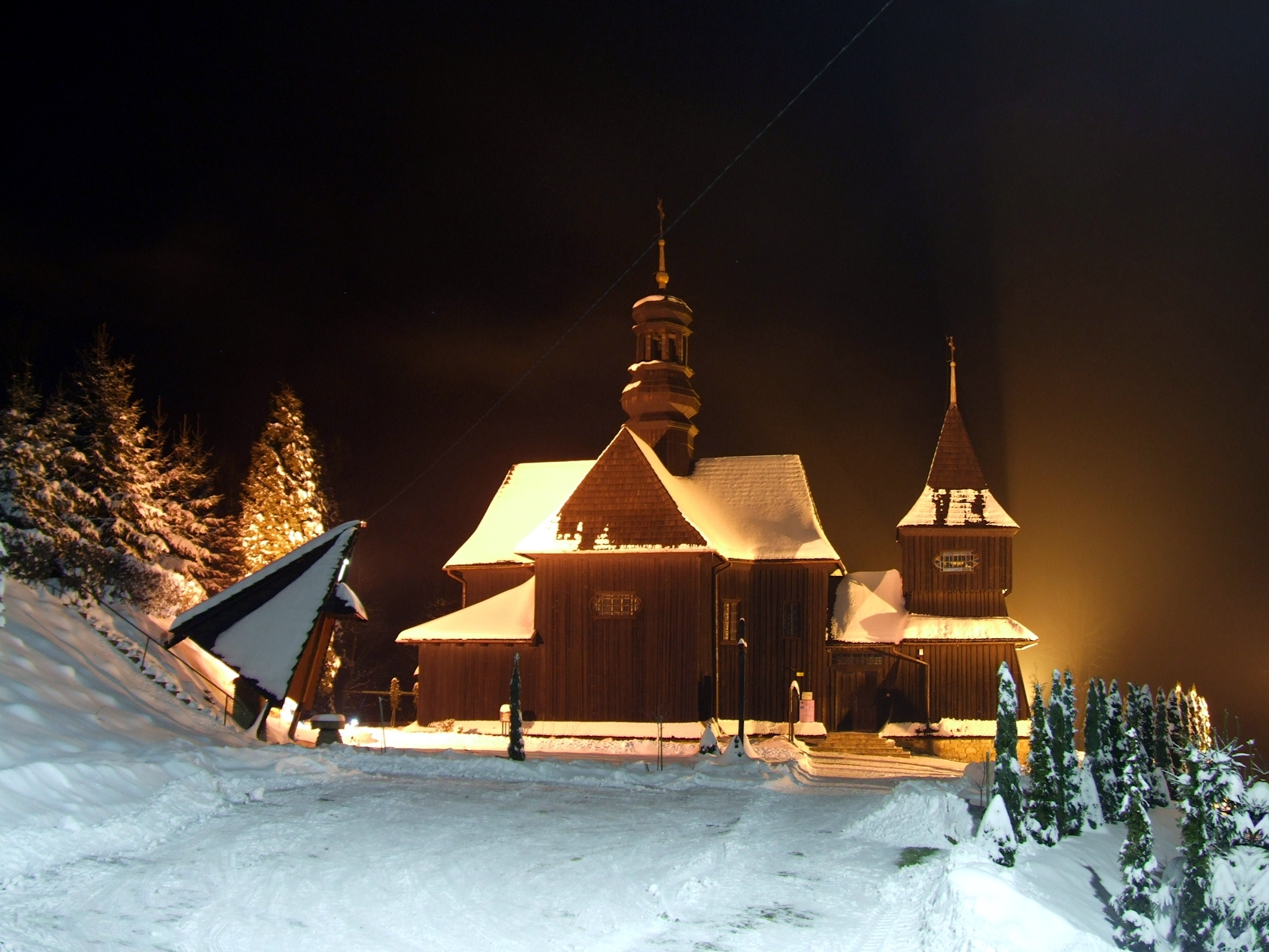
- Wooden church of St. Joachim in Skawinki by night

- Location within Poland
- Coordinates: 49°50′N 19°43′E
- Country: Poland
- Voivodeship: Lesser Poland
- County: Wadowice
- Gmina: Lanckorona
- Highest elevation: 535 m (1,755 ft)
- Lowest elevation: 350 m (1,150 ft)
- Population: 1,600

Skawinki [skaˈviŋki] is a village in the administrative district of Gmina Lanckorona, within Wadowice County, Lesser Poland Voivodeship, in southern Poland.
