= Zygodowice =

- Village
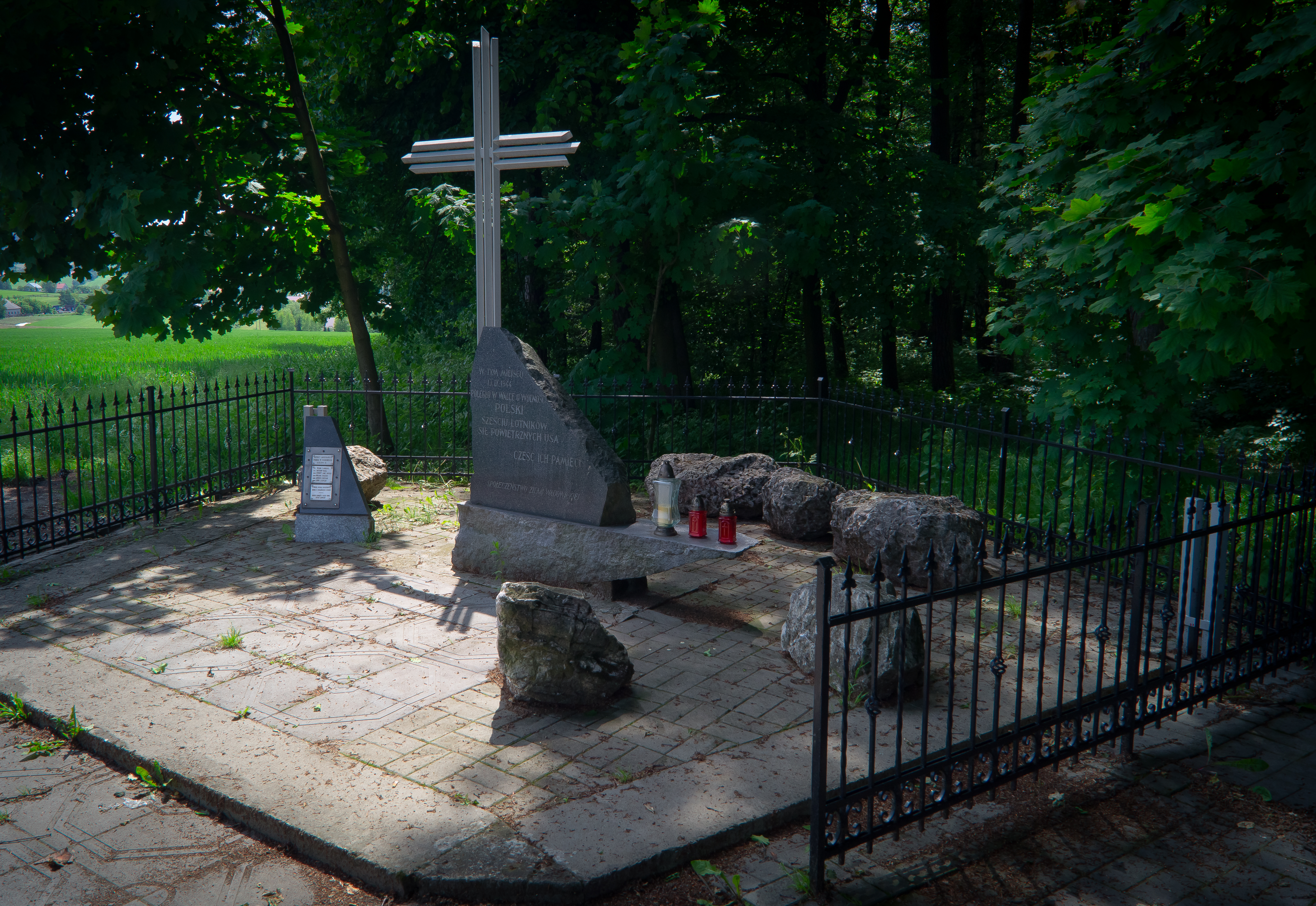
- Monument to American pilots

- Location within Poland
- Coordinates: 49°57′N 19°31′E
- Country: Poland
- Voivodeship: Lesser Poland
- County: Wadowice
- Gmina: Tomice
- Population: 416

Zygodowice [zɨɡɔdɔˈvit͡sɛ] is a village in the administrative district of Gmina Tomice, within Wadowice County, Lesser Poland Voivodeship, in southern Poland.
