= Izdebnik, Lesser Poland Voivodeship =

Izdebnik
- Village
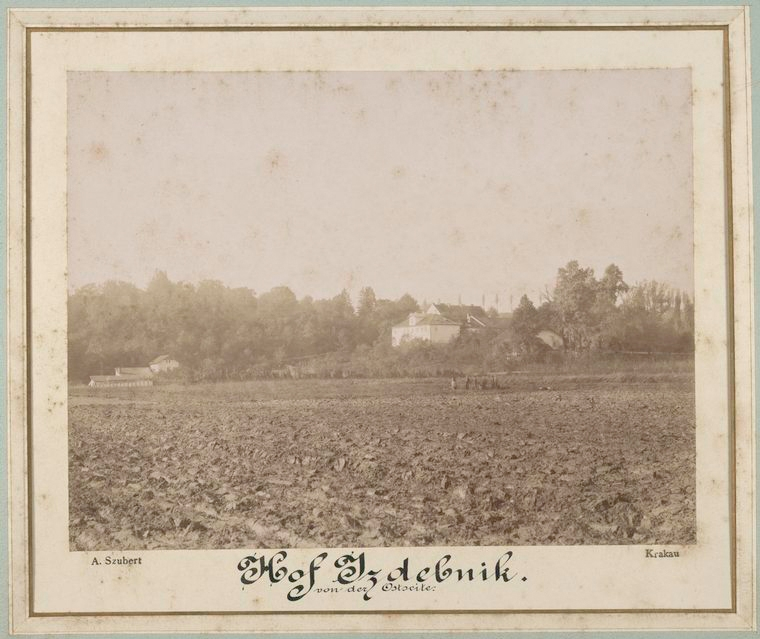
- c. 1897 photo of Izdebnik

- Location within Poland
- Coordinates: 49°52′12″N 19°45′48″E
- Country: Poland
- Voivodeship: Lesser Poland
- County: Wadowice
- Gmina: Lanckorona
- Highest elevation: 320 m (1,050 ft)
- Lowest elevation: 269 m (883 ft)
- Population (approx.): 2,000

Izdebnik (Polish pronunciation: [izˈdɛbɲik]) is a village in the administrative district of Gmina Lanckorona, within Wadowice County, Lesser Poland Voivodeship, in southern Poland.

The village has an approximate population of 2,000.
