= List of Basshunter live performances =

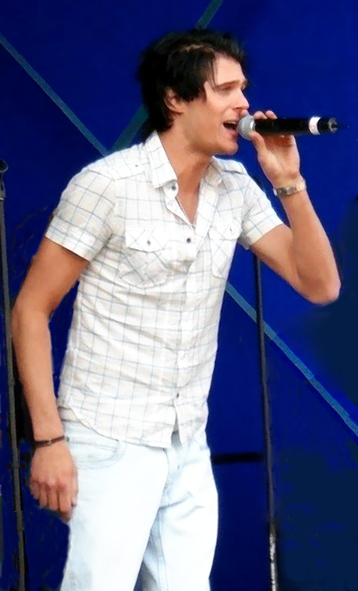
Basshunter during the concert in Halmstad, 20 April 2008

Basshunter is a Swedish singer, record producer and DJ. He tries to plan his performances at show but usually they are spontaneous. On 8 July 2006, he debuted in television during Sommarkrysset concert. In 2008, he said that he performed live at more than 600 shows in the United Kingdom. (Note: According to 2009 interview from Swedish magazine Filter Basshunter had performed over 600 concerts in 30 countries.) In April 2009, he said that the biggest crowd he ever played was 300,000 people at a festival and he played more than 25 concerts to more than 200,000 people. In October, he said that he was doing 20 shows in a week after "Boten Anna" release. Between 2007 and 2009, he had three proposals to perform at Melodifestivalen. In 2013, he said he performed during 1,000 shows in seven years.

== Concert tours ==
List of concert tours, with title, date, associated album, country, audience and gross
Title	Date	Associated album(s)	Country	Audience	Gross	Ref.
Hity Na Czasie	2007		Poland	1,200,000 (Note: Total audience from 8 concerts.)	—N/a	
Dance Nation Live	April 2009	Dance Nation – Your Big Night Out	United Kingdom	60,000	—N/a	

== One-off concerts ==
List of one-off concerts, with event, date, city, audience and gross
Event	Date	City	Audience	Gross	Ref.
Promotional show (Broadway)	14 November 2006	Reykjavík	—N/a	—N/a	
Promotional show (Discoplex A4)	August 2007	Pietna	—N/a	—N/a	
London Pride	5 July 2008	London	—N/a	—N/a	
Promotional show (Dunedin Town Hall)	11 October 2009	Dunedin	~3,000	—N/a	
Promotional show (Kittys)	10 December 2010	Kirkcaldy	—N/a	—N/a	
Promotional show (Levels Nightclub)	12 March 2013	State College	—N/a	—N/a	
Promotional show (Starlight Ballroom)	18 July 2013	Philadelphia	—N/a	—N/a	
Promotional show (Villa Strömpis)	5 February 2016	Örebro	—N/a	—N/a	
Promotional show (Pryzm)	9 December 2017	Plymouth	Hundreds	—N/a	
Promotional show (Ritz Nightclub)	15 December 2017	Örebro	—N/a	—N/a	
Promotional show (Energy 2000)	1 March 2025	Przytkowice	—N/a	—N/a	
Promotional show (Energy 2000)	2 March 2025	Katowice	—N/a	—N/a	

== Music festivals ==
List of music festivals, with name, date, city, audience and gross
Name	Date	City	Audience	Gross	Ref.
Sommarkrysset	8 July 2006	Stockholm	—N/a	—N/a	
Norway Cup	30 July 2006	Oslo	—N/a	—N/a	
Elämä lapselle	14 September 2006	Helsinki	—N/a	€750,000	
Mini Zulu Rocks	15 October 2006	Copenhagen	20,534	—N/a	
The Dome 41	2 March 2007	Mannheim	—N/a	—N/a	
Halmstadsanknytning	27 April 2007	Halmstad	—N/a	—N/a	
Sylwester pod Dobrą Gwiazdą	31 December 2007	Wrocław	200,000	—N/a	
The Dome 45	14 March 2008	Friedrichshafen	—N/a	—N/a	
Hity Na Czasie	31 August 2008	Katowice	—N/a	—N/a	
Elämä lapselle	6 September 2008	Helsinki	—N/a	—N/a	
BBC Switch Live	12 October 2008	London	5,000	—N/a	
The Trafford Centre's 10th Birthday Party	2008	Trafford	—N/a	—N/a	
Viva Comet	4 June 2009	Budapest	—N/a	—N/a	
Purple Party	28 April 2010	Chișinău	120,000	—N/a	
T4 on the Beach	5 July 2010	Weston-super-Mare	—N/a	—N/a	
Party in the Park	25 July 2010	Leeds	N/A/70,000	—N/a	
Youth Beatz	13 August 2011	Dumfries	N/A/11,000	—N/a	
Allsång på Skansen	3 July 2012	Stockholm	—N/a	—N/a	
Nottinghamshire Pride	July 2012	Nottingham	Hundreds	—N/a	
Swindon & Wiltshire Pride	4 August 2012	Swindon	—N/a	—N/a	
Maspalomas Pride	2012	Maspalomas	—N/a	—N/a	
Europa Plus Live	2013	Moscow	Hundreds of thousands	—N/a	
Nallikari Summer Party	5 July 2014	Oulu	7,500 (Note: Total audience from 5–7 July.)	—N/a	
Emmabodafestivalen	July 2014	Emmaboda	—N/a	—N/a	
Nýnemaball Verzló	4 September 2014	Hafnarfjörður	—N/a	—N/a	
Tórsfest	2015	Tórshavn	—N/a	—N/a	
Vi elsker 90'erne	26 June 2017	Aalborg	Few thousands	—N/a	
Emmabodafestivalen	26 July 2017	Emmaboda	—N/a	—N/a	
Vi elsker 90'erne	26 August 2017	Aarhus	10,000+	—N/a	
Youth Beatz	30 June 2018	Dumfries	36,129/40,000 (Note: Total audience from 30 June-1 July.)	£495,541 (Note: Total gross from 30 June-1 July.)	
The Gathering	19 April 2019	Hamar	—N/a	—N/a	
Deja Vu Fesztivál	6 August 2021	Szeged	—N/a	—N/a	
ØreSound Festival	13 August 2021	Copenhagen	—N/a	—N/a	
Veszprémi Egyetemi Napok	1 May 2022	Veszprém	—N/a	—N/a	
Lundakarnevalen	20 May 2022	Lund	—N/a	—N/a	
Grampian Pride	27 May 2023	Aberdeen	—N/a	—N/a	
Hearts Festival	3 July 2025	Halmstad	—N/a	—N/a	
Śląska Scena Letnia	30 August 2025	Chorzów	—N/a	—N/a	
