= Bugaj, Wadowice County =

Bugaj
- Village
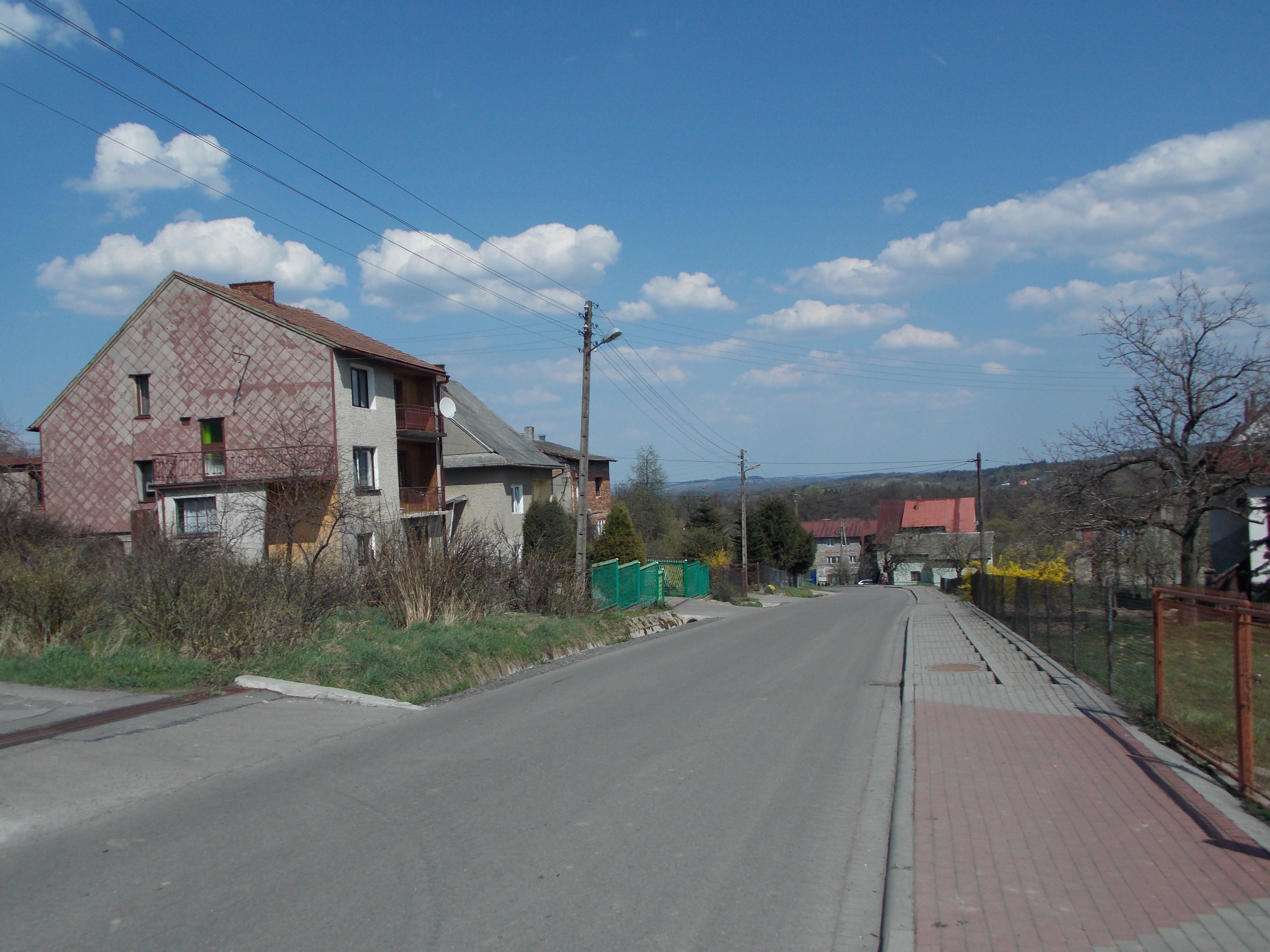

- Location within Poland
- Coordinates: 49°51′15″N 19°40′15″E
- Country: Poland
- Voivodeship: Lesser Poland
- County: Wadowice
- Gmina: Kalwaria Zebrzydowska
- Highest elevation: 420 m (1,380 ft)
- Lowest elevation: 300 m (980 ft)

Bugaj [ˈbuɡai̯] is a village in the administrative district of Gmina Kalwaria Zebrzydowska, within Wadowice County, Lesser Poland Voivodeship, in southern Poland.
