= Zebrzydowice, Lesser Poland Voivodeship =

Zebrzydowice
- Village
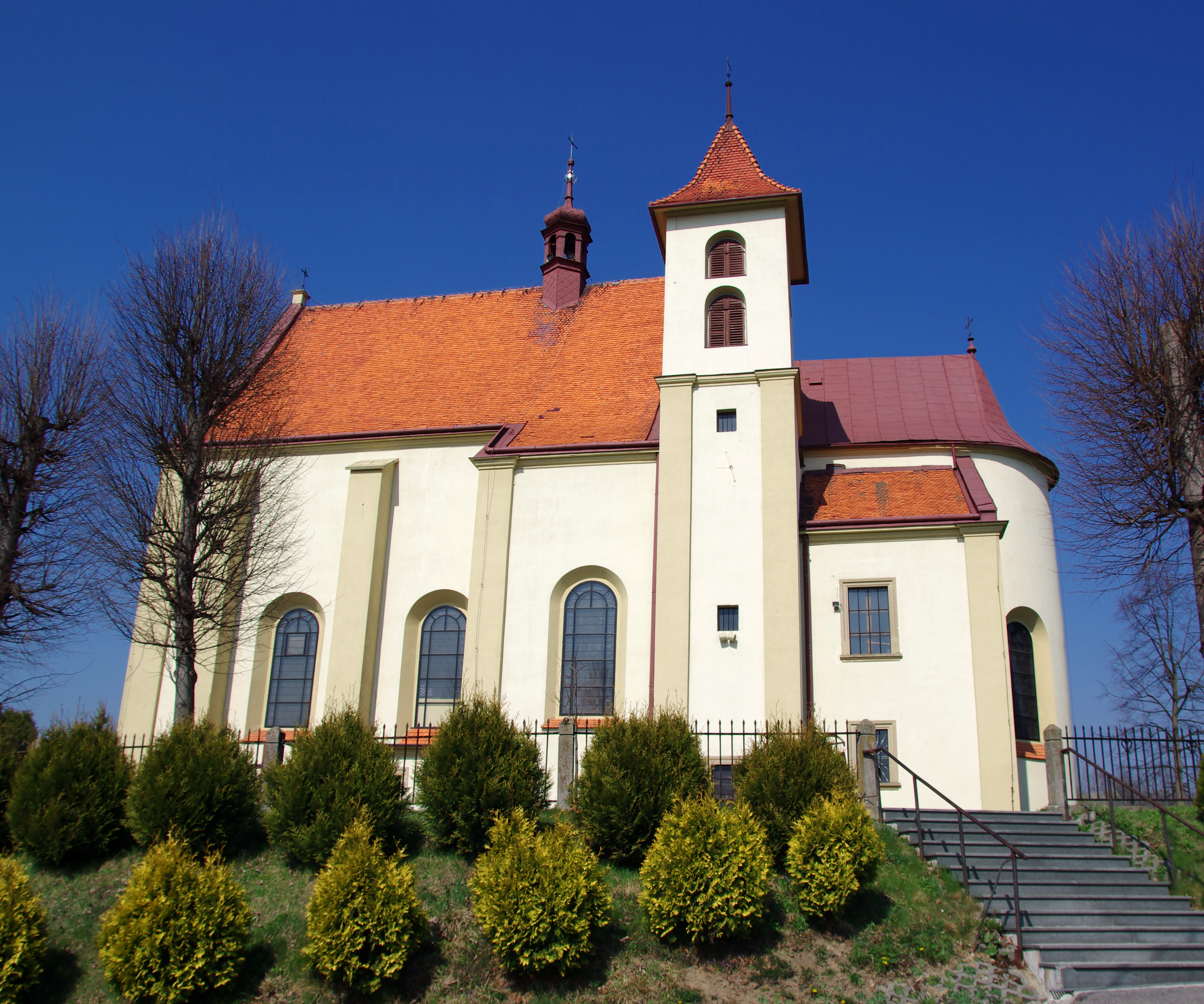
- Saint Michael Archangel church

- Location within Poland
- Coordinates: 49°54′N 19°38′E
- Country: Poland
- Voivodeship: Lesser Poland
- County: Wadowice
- Gmina: Kalwaria Zebrzydowska
- Highest elevation: 350 m (1,150 ft)
- Lowest elevation: 270 m (890 ft)
- Population: 4,300

Zebrzydowice [zɛbʐɨdɔˈvit͡sɛ] is a village in the administrative district of Gmina Kalwaria Zebrzydowska, within Wadowice County, Lesser Poland Voivodeship, in southern Poland.
