= Jastrzębia, Wadowice County =

Jastrzębia
- Village
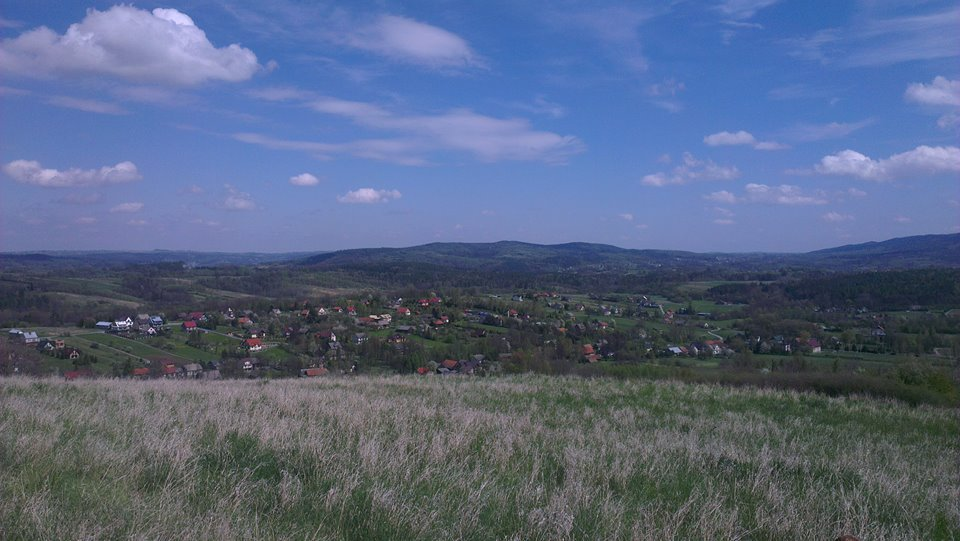

- Location within Poland
- Coordinates: 49°52′N 19°46′E
- Country: Poland
- Voivodeship: Lesser Poland
- County: Wadowice
- Gmina: Lanckorona
- Highest elevation: 400 m (1,300 ft)
- Lowest elevation: 340 m (1,120 ft)
- Population: 550

Jastrzębia [jasˈtʂɛmbja] is a village in the administrative district of Gmina Lanckorona, within Wadowice County, Lesser Poland Voivodeship, in southern Poland.
