= Stanisław Dolny =

- Village
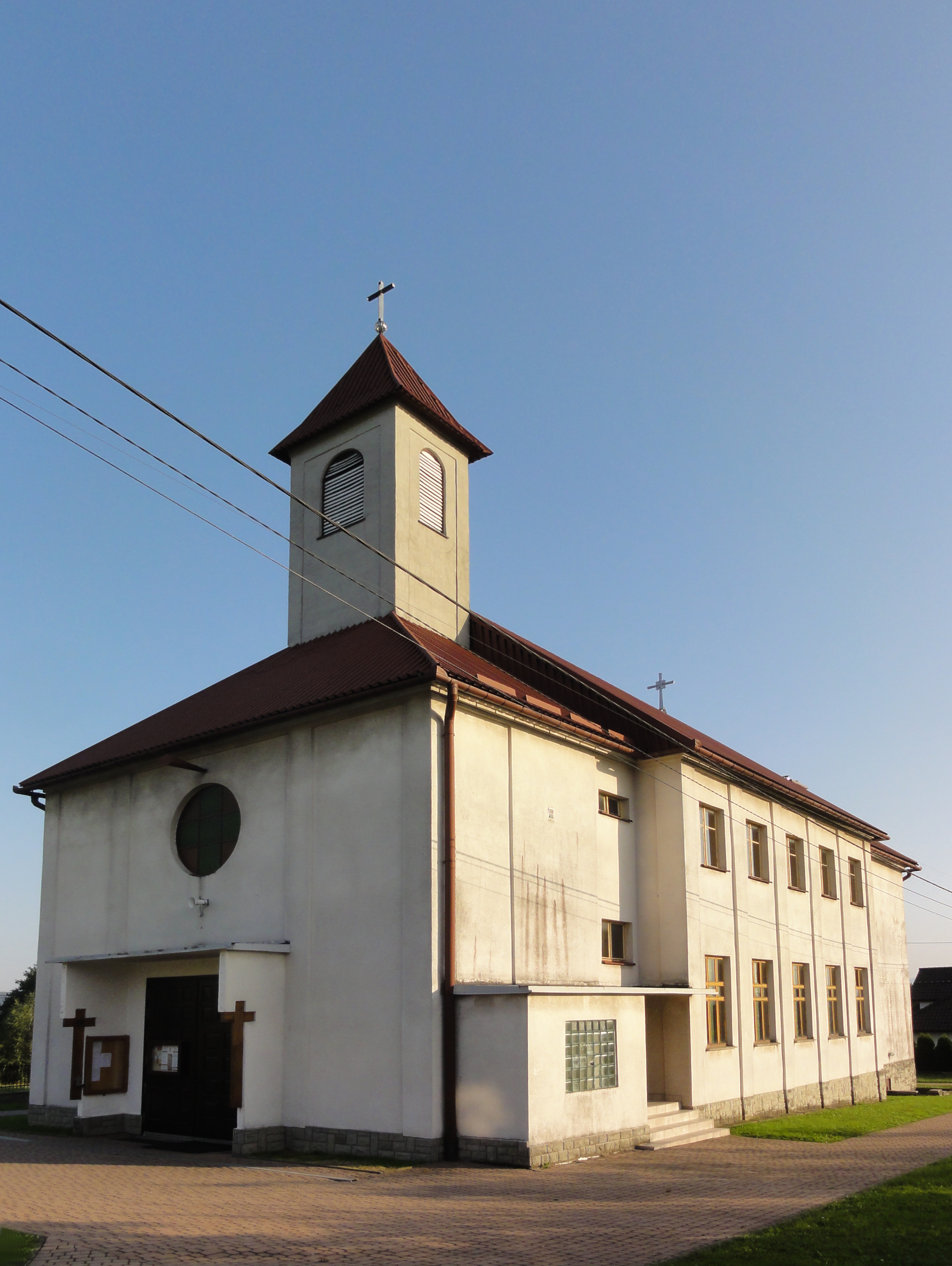
- Church of Saint Stanislaus Bishop Martyr

- Location within Poland
- Coordinates: 49°54′N 19°38′E
- Country: Poland
- Voivodeship: Lesser Poland
- County: Wadowice
- Gmina: Kalwaria Zebrzydowska

Stanisław Dolny [staˈniswaf ˈdɔlnɨ] is a village in the administrative district of Gmina Kalwaria Zebrzydowska, within Wadowice County, Lesser Poland Voivodeship, in southern Poland.
