= Przytkowice =

- Village
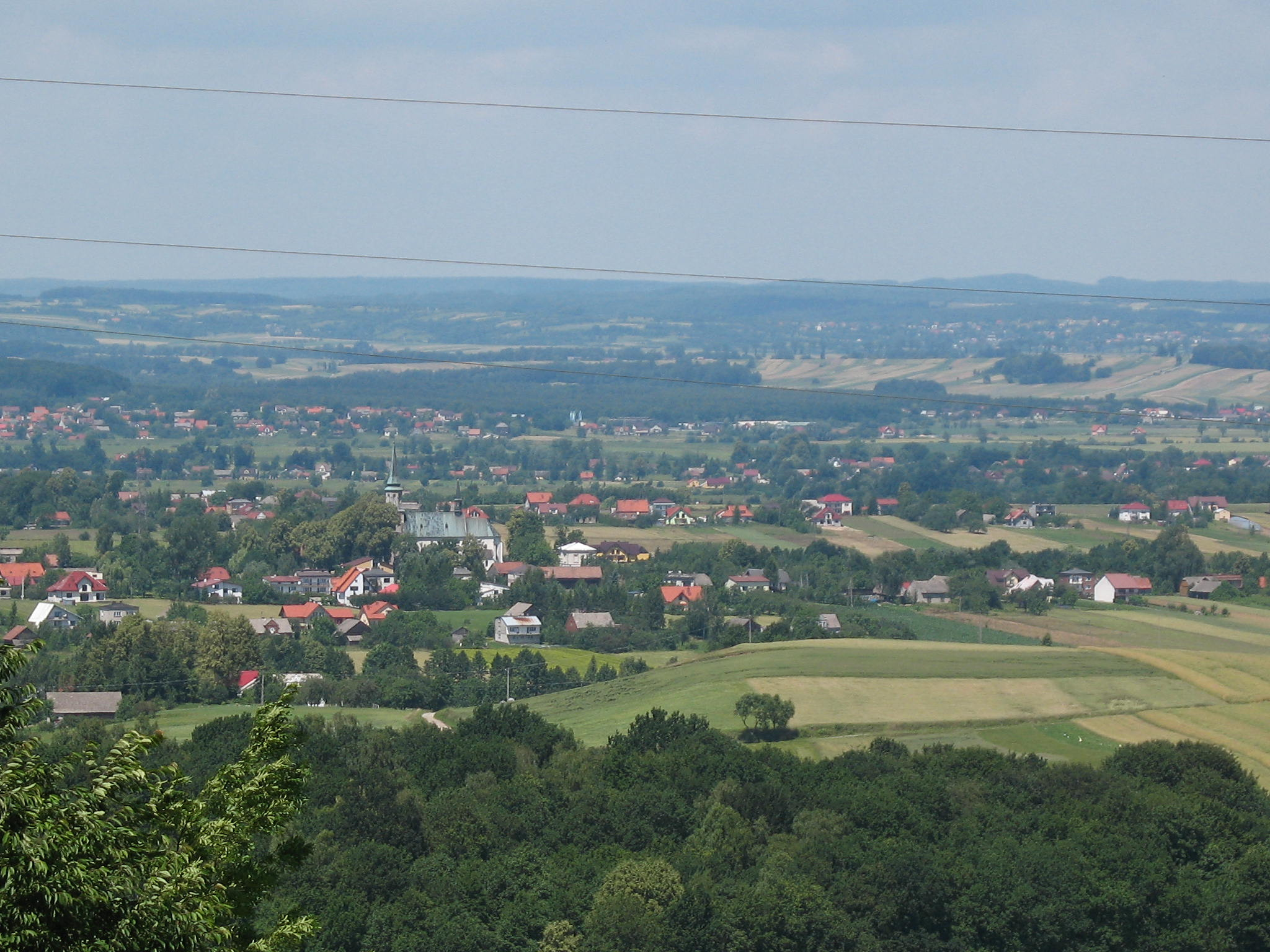

- Location within Poland
- Coordinates: 49°55′N 19°41′E
- Country: Poland
- Voivodeship: Lesser Poland
- County: Wadowice
- Gmina: Kalwaria Zebrzydowska
- Highest elevation: 360 m (1,180 ft)
- Lowest elevation: 280 m (920 ft)

Przytkowice [pʂɨtkɔˈvit͡sɛ] is a village in the administrative district of Gmina Kalwaria Zebrzydowska, within Wadowice County, Lesser Poland Voivodeship, in southern Poland.
