= Gmina Tomice =

Gmina Tomice Tomice Commune
- Gmina
- Flag Coat of arms
- Interactive map of Gmina Tomice
- Coordinates (Tomice): 49°54′4″N 19°29′9″E
- Country: Poland
- Voivodeship: Lesser Poland
- County: Wadowice
- Seat: Tomice

Area
  - Total: 41.73 km^{2} (16.11 sq mi)

Population (2006)
  - Total: 7,232
  - Density: 173.3/km^{2} (448.9/sq mi)
- Website: http://www.tomice.pl

Gmina Tomice is a rural gmina (administrative district) in Wadowice County, Lesser Poland Voivodeship, in southern Poland. Its seat is the village of Tomice, which lies approximately 3 kilometres (2 mi) north-west of Wadowice and 37 km (23 mi) south-west of the regional capital Kraków.

The gmina covers an area of 41.73 square kilometres (16.1 sq mi), and as of 2006 its total population is 7,232.

== Villages ==
Gmina Tomice contains the villages and settlements of Lgota, Radocza, Tomice, Witanowice, Woźniki and Zygodowice.

== Neighbouring gminas ==
Gmina Tomice is bordered by the gminas of Brzeźnica, Spytkowice, Wadowice, Wieprz and Zator.
