= Wieprz, Lesser Poland Voivodeship =

Wieprz
- Village
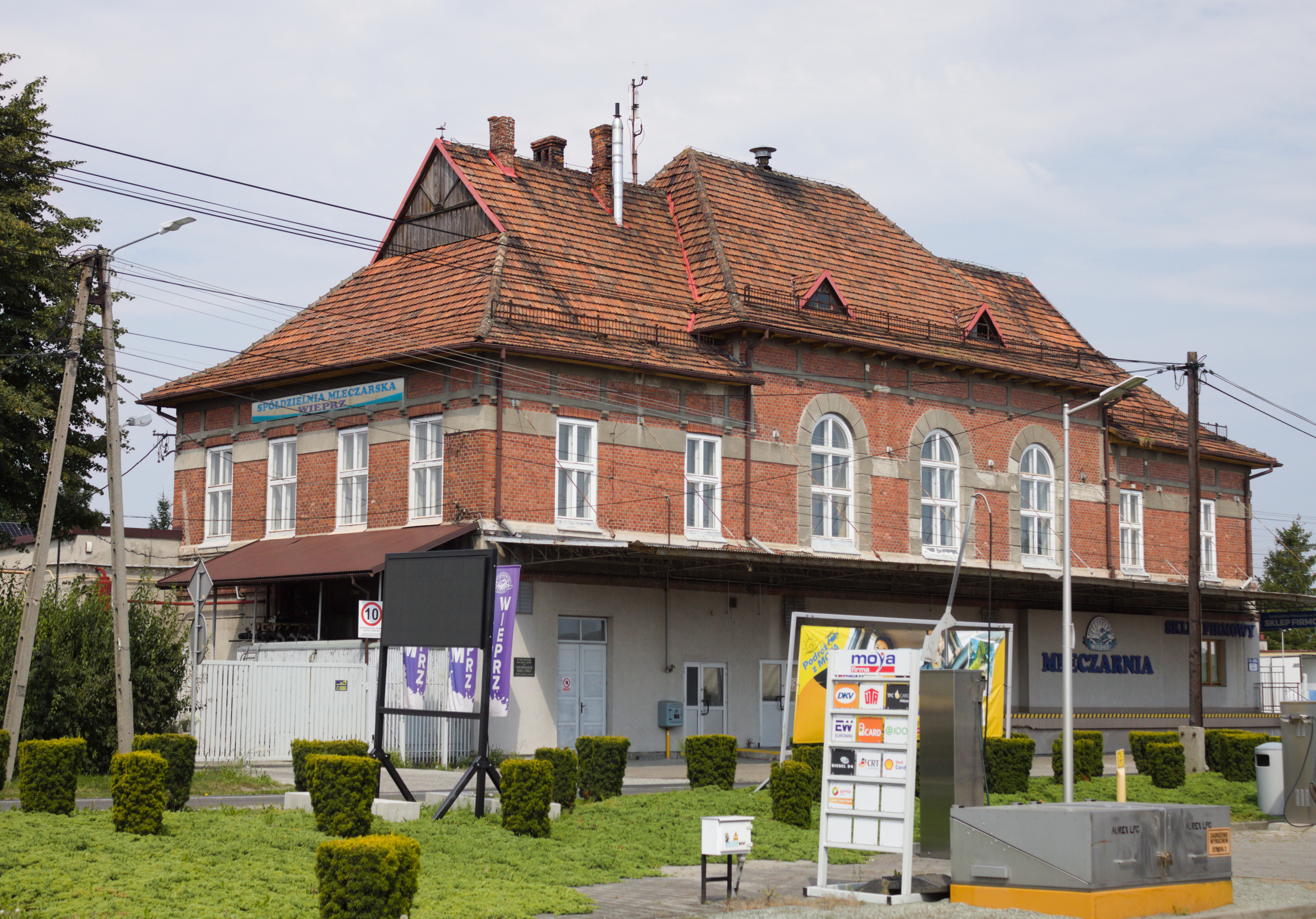

- Location within Poland
- Coordinates: 49°53′22″N 19°21′54″E
- Country: Poland
- Voivodeship: Lesser Poland
- County: Wadowice
- Gmina: Wieprz
- Highest elevation: 370 m (1,210 ft)
- Lowest elevation: 270 m (890 ft)
- Population: 5,002

Wieprz (Polish: [ˈvjɛpʂ], lit. '"Boar"') is a village in Wadowice County, Lesser Poland Voivodeship, in southern Poland. It is the seat of the gmina (administrative district) called Gmina Wieprz.
