= Tomice, Lesser Poland Voivodeship =

Tomice
- Village
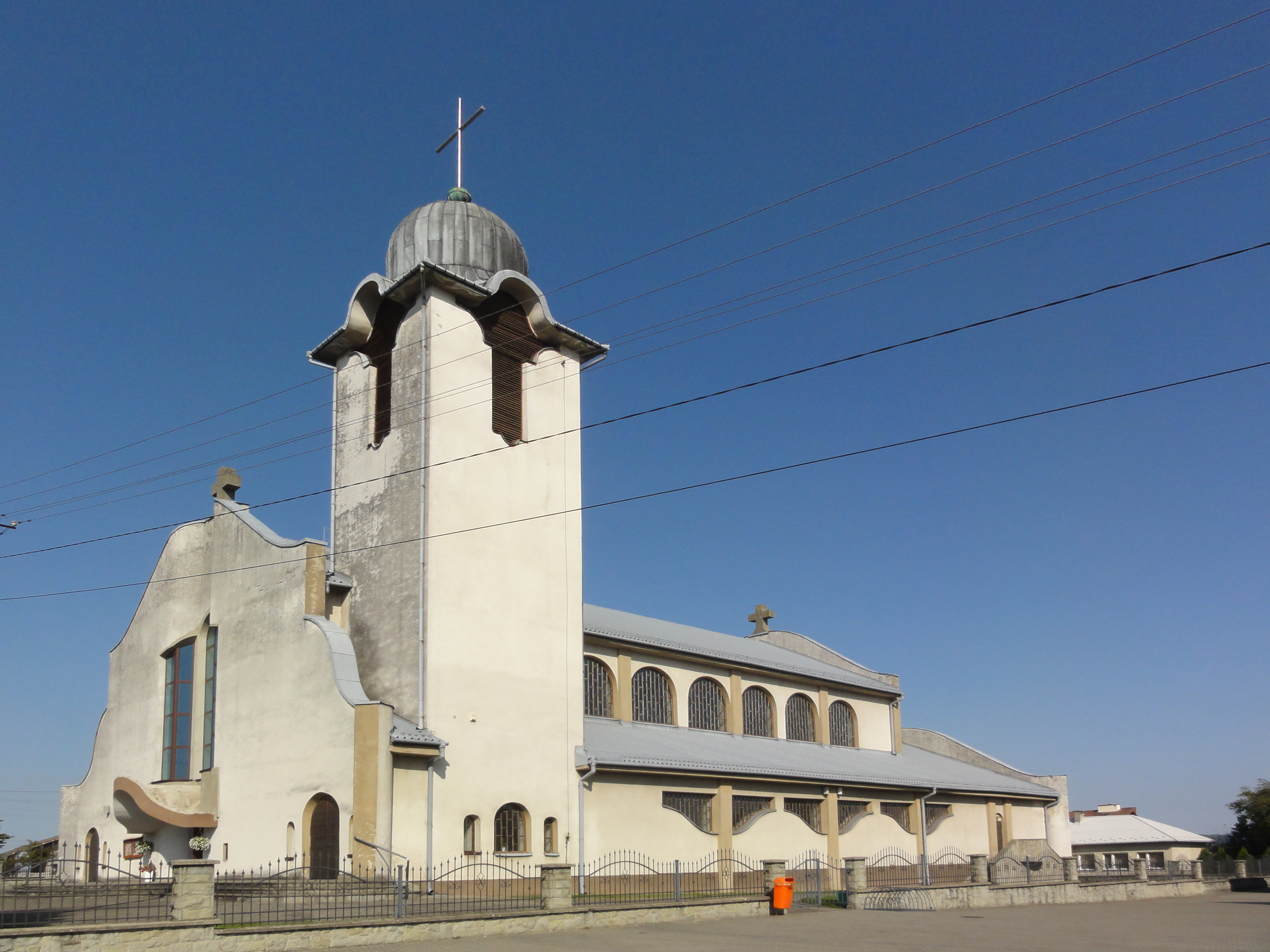
- Church of Saints Joachim and Anna

- Location within Poland
- Coordinates: 49°54′4″N 19°29′9″E
- Country: Poland
- Voivodeship: Lesser Poland
- County: Wadowice
- Gmina: Tomice
- Highest elevation: 450 m (1,480 ft)
- Lowest elevation: 440 m (1,440 ft)

Population
  - Total: 2,185

Tomice [tɔˈmit͡sɛ] is a village in Wadowice County, Lesser Poland Voivodeship, in southern Poland. It is the seat of the gmina (administrative district) called Gmina Tomice.
