= Barwałd Średni =

- Village
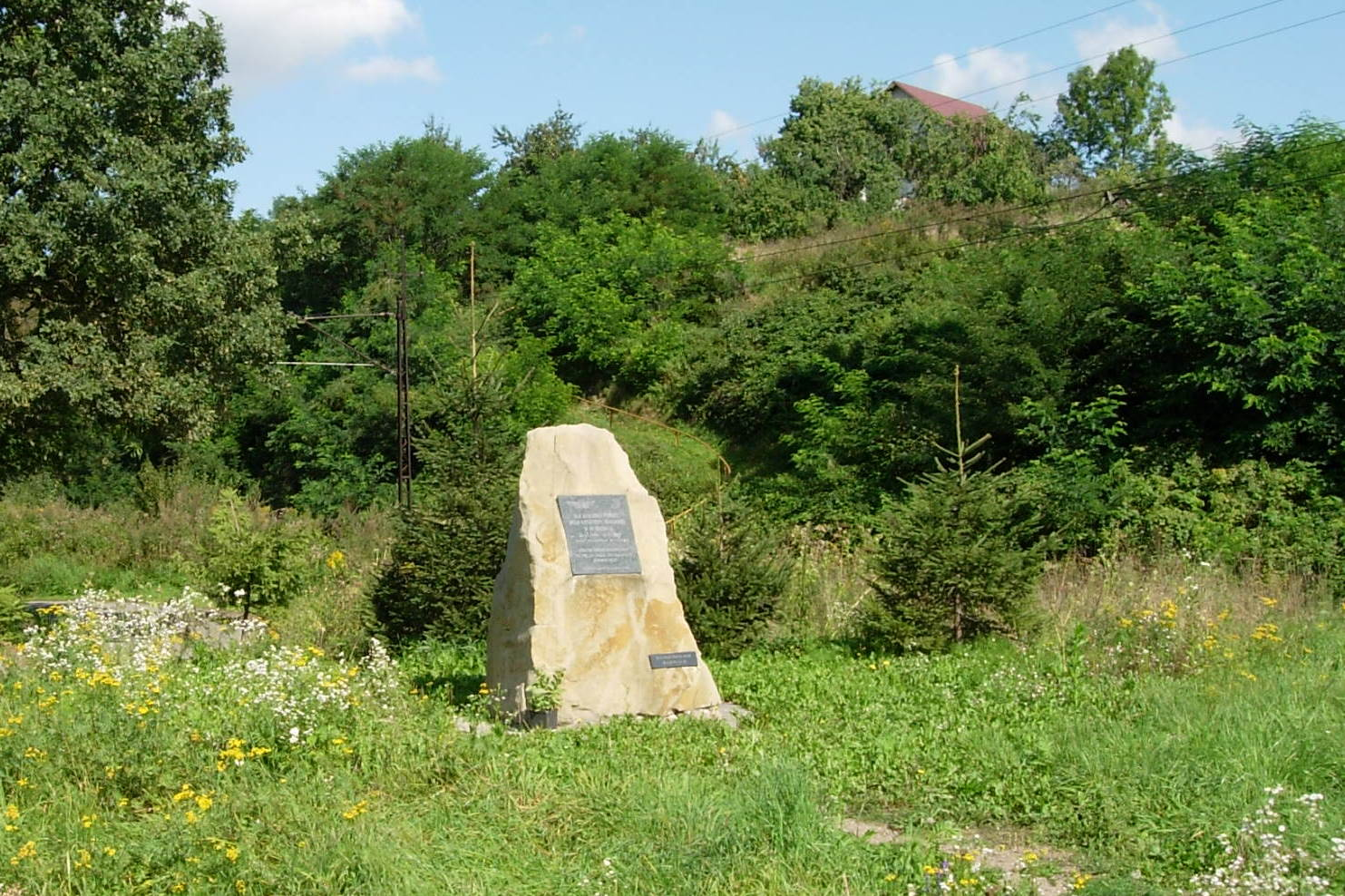
- Obelisk commemorating the 1944 railway catastrophe

- Location within Poland
- Coordinates: 49°52′N 19°36′E
- Country: Poland
- Voivodeship: Lesser Poland
- County: Wadowice
- Gmina: Kalwaria Zebrzydowska

Barwałd Średni (pronounced [ˈbarvawt ˈɕrɛdɲi]) is a village in southern Poland, located in the administrative district of Gmina Kalwaria Zebrzydowska within Wadowice County, Lesser Poland Voivodeship.

== History ==
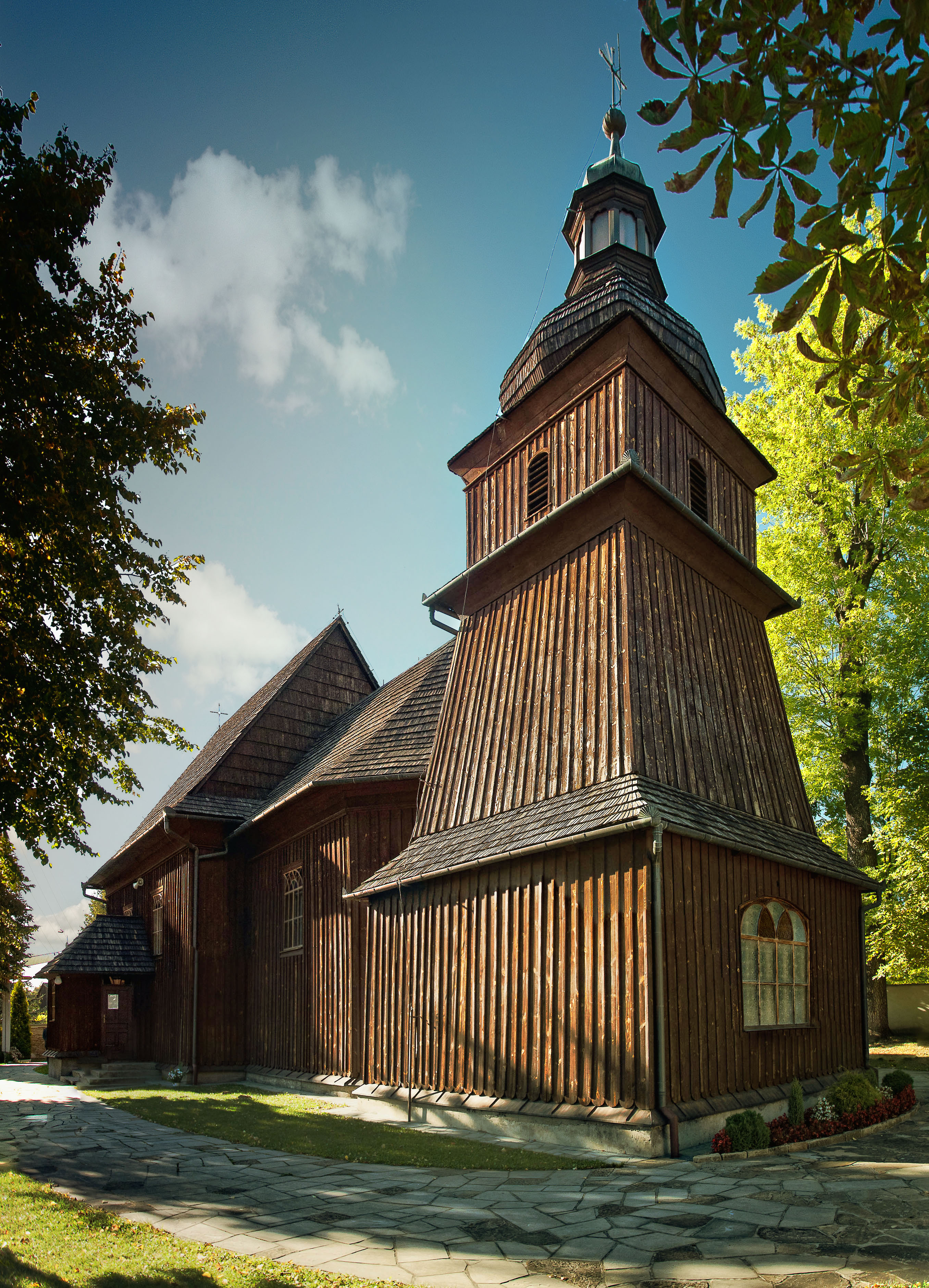
Rare wooden St. Erasmus Church at Barwałd Dolny

The growing settlement of Barwałd was divided in the 16th century into three separate villages: Barwałd Górny (Upper), Barwałd Dolny (Lower) and Barwałd Średni (the Middle Barwałd).

The wooden parish church of St. Erasmus was built in the second half of the 18th century. It was financed by the district landlord, Jan Biberstein-Starowieyski. The spire is a remnant of the previous 16th-century church of the Assumption of the Blessed Virgin Mary. The layout, in which the spire is located to the east of the chancel, is unusual and rarely found. There is polychrome decoration dating from the end of the 18th century, which features figurative, vegetative and geometric motifs. On the chancel ceiling you can see a painting of The Assumption of the Blessed Virgin Mary, while in the nave there is The Transfiguration of Our Lord on Mount Tabor. The main altar contains an 18th-century painting of St. Erasmus.

=== World War II railway catastrophe ===
On 24 November 1944 two trains (one German with military cargo, and one Polish) traveling at regular speeds collided head-on in Barwałd Średni. It was the biggest train collision of World War II in occupied Poland with both locomotives and nearly half of their trainsets destroyed completely. Some 130 people from the Polish passenger train were killed and over 100 wounded.
