= Gmina Wieprz =

Gmina Wieprz Wieprz Commune
- Gmina
- Location within Poland
- Coordinates (Wieprz): 49°53′22″N 19°21′54″E
- Country: Poland
- Voivodeship: Lesser Poland
- County: Wadowice
- Seat: Wieprz

Area
  - Total: 74.51 km^{2} (28.77 sq mi)

Population (2006)
  - Total: 11,493
  - Density: 154.2/km^{2} (399.5/sq mi)
- Website: http://www.wieprz.pl

Gmina Wieprz is a rural gmina (administrative district) in Wadowice County, Lesser Poland Voivodeship, in southern Poland. Its seat is the village of Wieprz, which lies approximately 10 kilometres (6 mi) west of Wadowice and 46 km (29 mi) south-west of the regional capital Kraków.

The gmina covers an area of 74.51 square kilometres (28.8 sq mi), and as of 2006 its total population is 11,493.

== Villages ==
Gmina Wieprz contains the villages and settlements of Frydrychowice, Gierałtowice, Gierałtowiczki, Nidek, Przybradz and Wieprz.

== Neighbouring gminas ==
Gmina Wieprz is bordered by the gminas of Andrychów, Kęty, Osiek, Polanka Wielka, Przeciszów, Tomice, Wadowice and Zator.
