= Radocza =

- Village
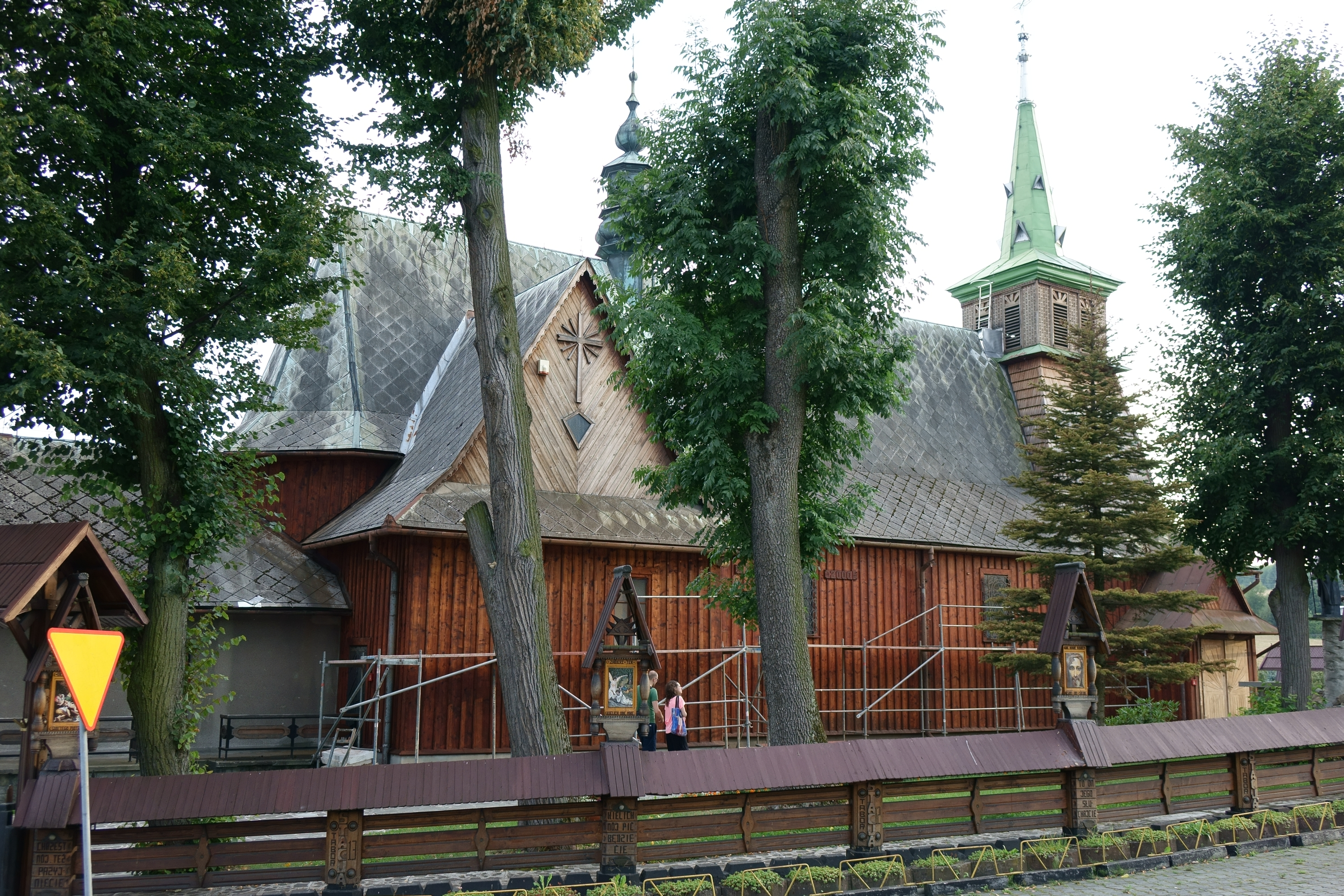
- Transfiguration of Christ Church

- Location within Poland
- Coordinates: 49°55′N 19°29′E
- Country: Poland
- Voivodeship: Lesser Poland
- County: Wadowice
- Gmina: Tomice
- Population: 1,997

Radocza [raˈdɔt͡ʂa] is a village in the administrative district of Gmina Tomice, within Wadowice County, Lesser Poland Voivodeship, in southern Poland.
