= Gmina Lanckorona =

Gmina Lanckorona Lanckorona Commune
- Gmina
- Flag Coat of arms
- Interactive map of Gmina Lanckorona
- Coordinates (Lanckorona): 49°52′N 19°43′E
- Country: Poland
- Voivodeship: Lesser Poland
- County: Wadowice
- Seat: Lanckorona

Area
  - Total: 40.61 km^{2} (15.68 sq mi)

Population (2006)
  - Total: 5,819
  - Density: 143.3/km^{2} (371.1/sq mi)
- Website: http://www.lanckorona.pl/

Gmina Lanckorona is a rural gmina (administrative district) in Wadowice County, Lesser Poland Voivodeship, in southern Poland. Its seat is the village of Lanckorona, which lies approximately 16 kilometres (10 mi) east of Wadowice and 27 km (17 mi) south-west of the regional capital Kraków.

The gmina covers an area of 40.61 square kilometres (15.7 sq mi), and as of 2006 its total population is 5,819.

== Villages ==
Gmina Lanckorona contains the villages and settlements of Izdebnik, Jastrzębia, Lanckorona, Podchybie and Skawinki.

== Neighbouring gminas ==
Gmina Lanckorona is bordered by the gminas of Budzów, Kalwaria Zebrzydowska, Skawina, Stryszów and Sułkowice.
