= Gmina Kalwaria Zebrzydowska =

Gmina Kalwaria Zebrzydowska Kalwaria Zebrzydowska Commune
- Gmina
- Coat of arms
- Interactive map of Gmina Kalwaria Zebrzydowska
- Coordinates (Kalwaria Zebrzydowska): 49°52′N 19°41′E
- Country: Poland
- Voivodeship: Lesser Poland
- County: Wadowice
- Seat: Kalwaria Zebrzydowska

Area
  - Total: 75.32 km^{2} (29.08 sq mi)

Population (2006)
  - Total: 19,210
  - Density: 255.0/km^{2} (660.6/sq mi)
  - Urban: 4,503
  - Rural: 14,707
- Website: http://www.kalwaria-zebrzydowska.pl/

Gmina Kalwaria Zebrzydowska is an urban-rural gmina (administrative district) in Wadowice County, Lesser Poland Voivodeship, in southern Poland. Its seat is the town of Kalwaria Zebrzydowska, which lies approximately 14 kilometres (9 mi) east of Wadowice and 29 km (18 mi) south-west of the regional capital Kraków.

The gmina covers an area of 75.32 square kilometres (29.1 sq mi), and as of 2006 its total population is 19,210 (of which the population of Kalwaria Zebrzydowska ia 4,503, and the population of the rural part of the gmina is 14,707).

== Villages ==
Apart from the town of Kalwaria Zebrzydowska, Gmina Kalwaria Zebrzydowska contains the villages and settlements of Barwałd Górny, Barwałd Średni, Brody, Bugaj, Leńcze, Podolany, Przytkowice, Stanisław Dolny, Zarzyce Małe, Zarzyce Wielkie and Zebrzydowice.

== Neighbouring gminas ==
Gmina Kalwaria Zebrzydowska is bordered by the gminas of Brzeźnica, Lanckorona, Skawina, Stryszów and Wadowice.
