= Wadowice County =

Wadowice County Powiat wadowicki
- County
- Flag Coat of arms

- Location within the voivodeship

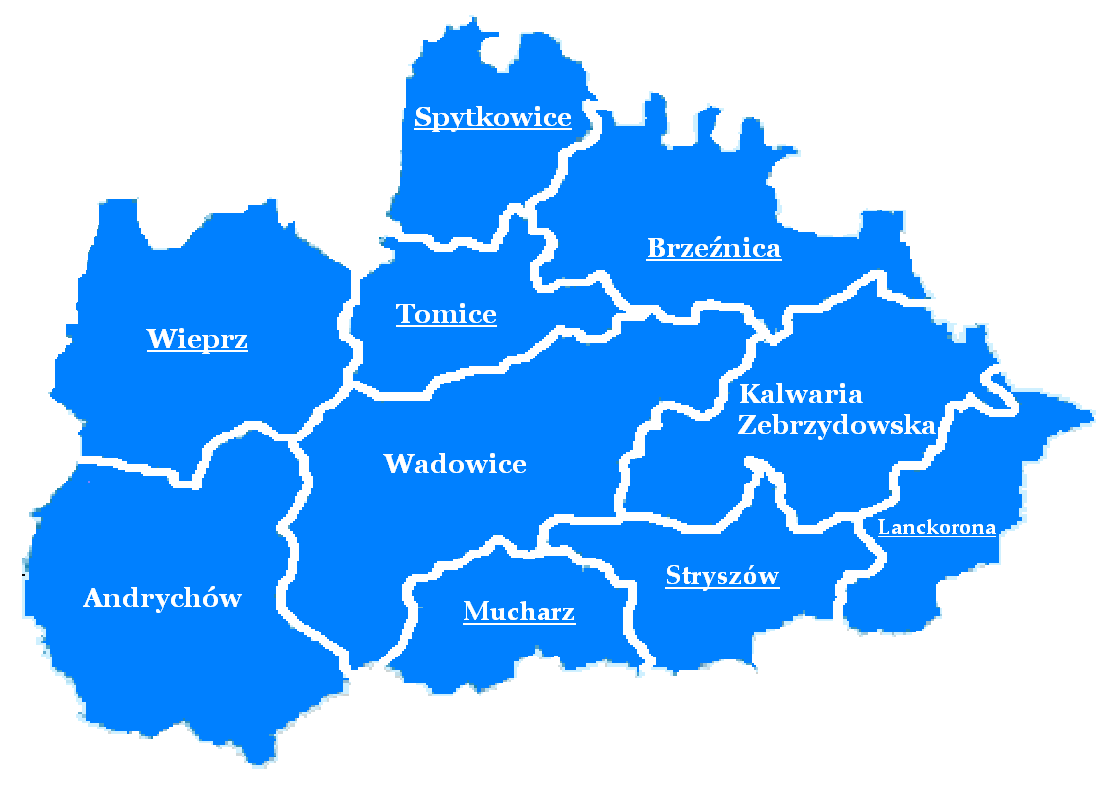
- Division into gminas
- Coordinates (Wadowice): 49°53′N 19°30′E
- Country: Poland
- Voivodeship: Lesser Poland
- Seat: Wadowice
- Gminas: Total 10: Gmina Andrychów; Gmina Brzeźnica; Gmina Kalwaria Zebrzydowska; Gmina Lanckorona; Gmina Mucharz; Gmina Spytkowice; Gmina Stryszów; Gmina Tomice; Gmina Wadowice; Gmina Wieprz

Area
  - Total: 645.74 km^{2} (249.32 sq mi)

Population (2006)
  - Total: 154,304
  - Density: 238.96/km^{2} (618.90/sq mi)
  - Urban: 45,343
  - Rural: 108,961
- Car plates: KWA
- Website: www.starostwo.wadowice.pl

Wadowice County (Polish: powiat wadowicki) is a unit of territorial administration and local government (powiat) in Lesser Poland Voivodeship, southern Poland. It came into being on January 1, 1999, as a result of the Polish local government reforms passed in 1998. Its administrative seat is the town of Wadowice, the birthplace of Pope John Paul II, which lies 38 kilometres (24 mi) south-west of the regional capital Kraków. The county also contains the towns of Andrychów, lying 13 km (8 mi) west of Wadowice, and Kalwaria Zebrzydowska, 14 km (9 mi) east of Wadowice.

The county covers an area of 645.74 square kilometres (249.3 sq mi). As of 2006 its total population is 154,304, out of which the population of Andrychów is 21,691, that of Wadowice is 19,149, that of Kalwaria Zebrzydowska is 4,503, and the rural population is 108,961.

== Neighbouring counties ==
Wadowice County is bordered by Chrzanów County to the north, Kraków County and Myślenice County to the east, Sucha County to the south, Żywiec County to the south-west, Bielsko County to the west, and Oświęcim County to the north-west.

== Administrative division ==
The county is subdivided into 10 gminas (three urban-rural and seven rural). These are listed in the following table, in descending order of population.

Gmina	Type	Area (km^{2})	Population (2006)	Seat
Gmina Andrychów	urban-rural	100.6	42,893	Andrychów
Gmina Wadowice	urban-rural	113.0	37,481	Wadowice
Gmina Kalwaria Zebrzydowska	urban-rural	75.3	19,210	Kalwaria Zebrzydowska
Gmina Wieprz	rural	74.5	11,493	Wieprz
Gmina Brzeźnica	rural	66.3	10,232	Brzeźnica
Gmina Spytkowice	rural	47.0	9,376	Spytkowice
Gmina Tomice	rural	41.7	7,232	Tomice
Gmina Stryszów	rural	46.1	6,690	Stryszów
Gmina Lanckorona	rural	40.6	5,819	Lanckorona
Gmina Mucharz	rural	37.3	3,878	Mucharz
