= Ride For The Living =

Annual JCC Krakow event

Ride For The Living (RFTL) – is an annual four-day educational, social, and spiritual fitness experience and fundraising opportunity that the Jewish Community Centre of Kraków (JCC Krakow) has organized since 2014. The main event of RFTL, a day-long bike ride traveling 60 miles from the gates of Auschwitz-Birkenau to JCC Krakow, includes participants from numerous countries. Scheduled during the Jewish Culture Festival and incorporating a variety of programs highlighting the past, present, and future of greater Kraków, the ride serves both to commemorate the Holocaust and to celebrate the rebirth of Jewish life in Poland.

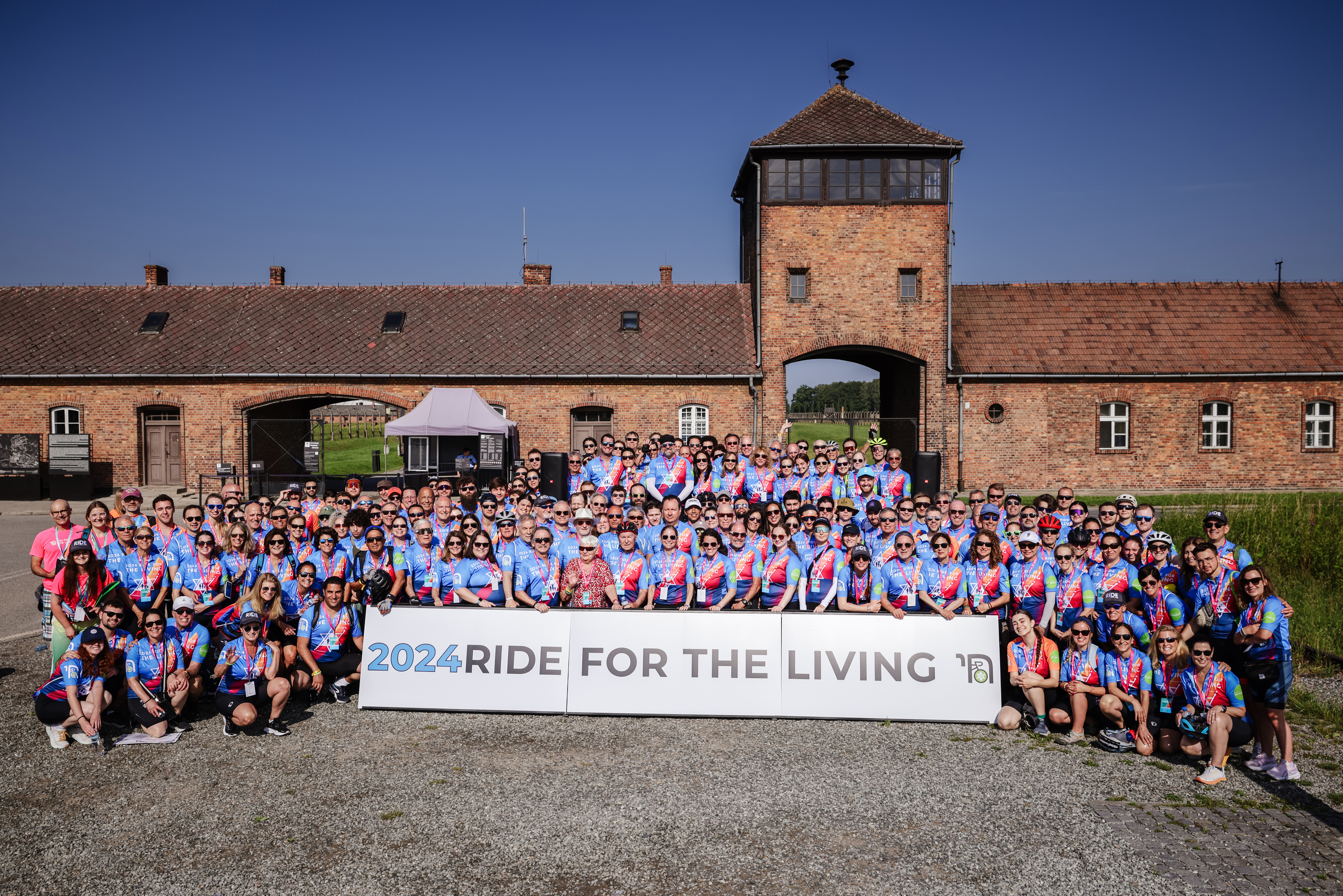
Group photo of participants outside of Auschwitz-Birkenau during the 2024 RFTL

== History ==
=== 2014-19: Creation and early years ===
Robert Desmond cycled 1,350 miles from London to Auschwitz, touring Holocaust and World War II historical sites along the route. Following his ride, he visited JCC Krakow and discovered a vibrant, living Jewish community in Poland, which surprised him. CEO Jonathan Ornstein and his team at JCC Krakow were similarly impressed to hear about Desmond's journey but considered it symbolically unfinished. Thus, they created Ride For The Living to complete the ride by biking from Auschwitz to JCC Krakow, from despair and loss to hope and resilience. The inaugural edition in 2014 featured 14 riders, including members of the Kraków, Jewish community and special guests from Poland, the United Kingdom, the United States, and Israel. The funds the event raised were used for Holocaust survivors from the Kraków, community to travel to Israel—the first time that many of them had visited the country or even traveled abroad.

In 2015, Marcel Zieliński, then an 80-year-old Holocaust survivor who had walked from Auschwitz to Kraków as a 10-year-old after liberation, joined RFTL. He became an annual participant, riding alongside his family and hundreds of international supporters on a path nearly identical to that of his childhood trek.

By 2019, RFTL had grown to include over 200 participants.

=== 2020-21: COVID-19 pandemic ===
Due to the global pandemic, Ride For The Living pioneered its Global Challenge, allowing individuals to connect with the program without posing excessive public-health risk by participating virtually through self-directed exercise and recreation activities.

=== 2022-24: Ukraine war response and return to normal programming ===
As public authorities lifted pandemic measures, RFTL returned to hosting its marquee in-person program while still keeping the accessible options that had allowed for increased participation. A 5K Walk For The Living option also became available for individuals unable to complete the bike ride.

Immediately following the Russian invasion of Ukraine on February 24, 2022, JCC Krakow established a full-scale humanitarian-aid operation, providing food, housing, and integration assistance each week to thousands of people forced to flee, directly supporting 360,000 displaced individuals by 2024 with a fundraising campaign that ultimately raised 12 million dollars. In light of this work, Ride For The Living created a special supplemental program, consisting of a bike ride from the Ukrainian border to JCC Krakow, in solidarity with everyone the war had impacted. By starting a day earlier than the standard group riding from Auschwitz-Birkenau, all participants finished approximately synchronously.

=== 2025: Tenth annual ride ===
Ride For The Living celebrated its tenth iteration in June 2025. The year aligned with the 80th anniversary of the liberation of Auschwitz.

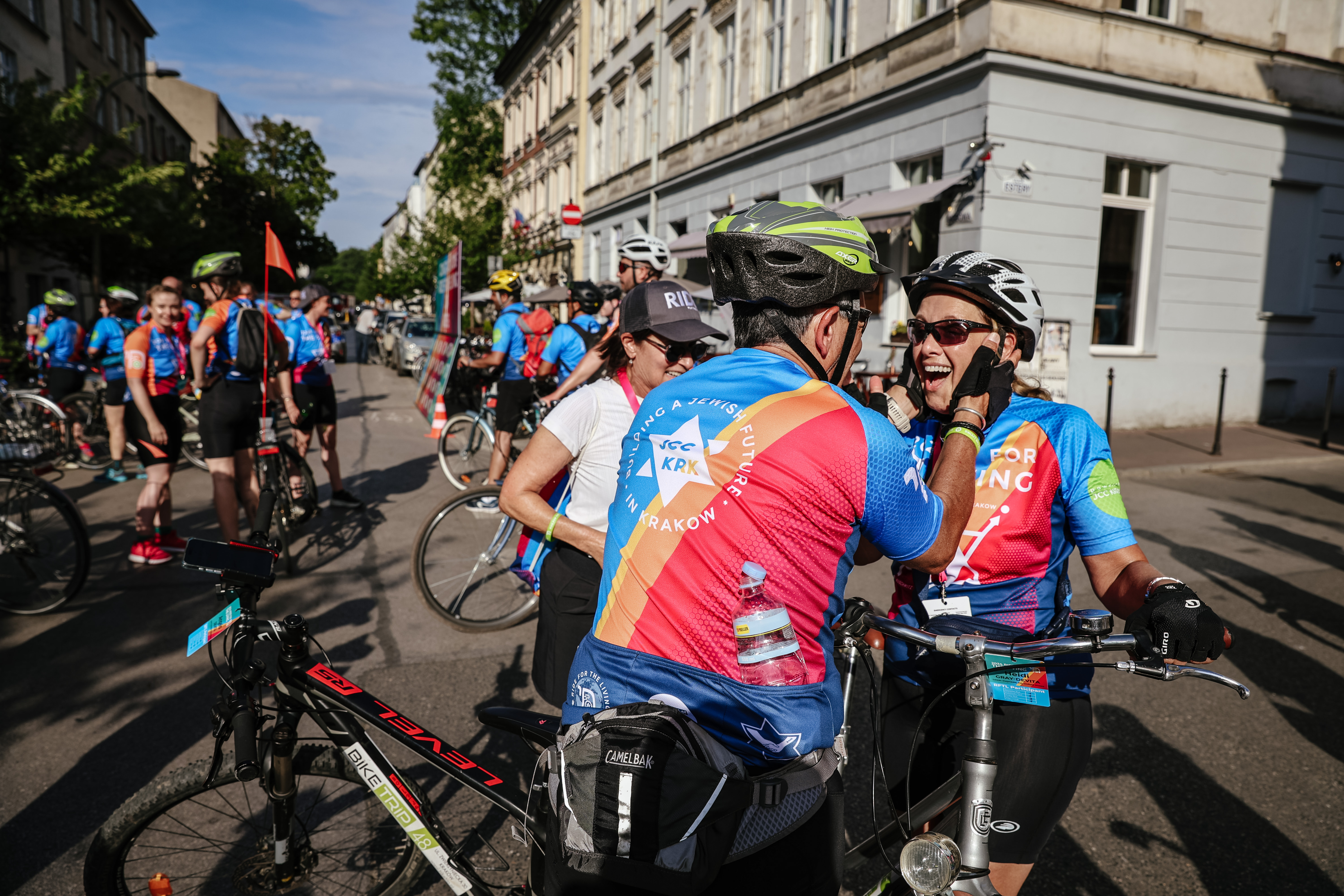
Participants celebrating arrival to JCC Krakow and successful completion of the 2024 bike ride

== Purpose ==
As a comprehensive educational, social, and spiritual fitness experience, Ride For The Living provides participants a substantive understanding of the past, present, and future of Jewish Kraków. The program incorporates sessions on the Holocaust and historical background as well as contemporary life and revival of the region.

RFTL is also the largest fundraising campaign of JCC Krakow, financially supporting much of the annual programming. The funds raised during the first edition of the rally in 2014 allowed 30 Holocaust survivors to visit Israel. Much of the JCC Krakow operating budget comes from RFTL. The money finances initiatives for various age demographics and interest groups within the community, such as the FRAJDA Early School Education Center, the Hillel Gimel Jewish Student Club, and others. Sample programming includes English lessons, medical care, university-level courses, Shabbat dinners, and Jewish holiday rituals.

== Structure and route ==
The RFTL program takes place from Wednesday to Sunday. In part, it consists of:

- Guided visit to the Auschwitz-Birkenau State Museum in Oświęcim and participation in ceremonies commemorating the victims of extermination
- Ride For The Living: 60-mile bike ride from Auschwitz-Birkenau (or 5K Walk For the Living from the Płaszów concentration camp) to JCC Krakow
- Shabbat dinner with an average of 700 attendees, including RFTL participants, the local community, and guests of the Jewish Culture Festival in Krakow
- Tours of Kraków
- Participation in Jewish Culture Festival events throughout Kraków

The 60-mile bike ride itself traces the Polish countryside, passing through various villages and towns from the Auschwitz-Birkenau en route to Krakow. While the precise path changes year-to-year due to road conditions, in the past, it has mostly followed the Vistula Bicycle Route, moving through Oświęcim, Przeciszów, Podolsze, Morysina, Smolice, Miejsce, Spytkowice, Lipowa, Łączany, Chrząstowice, Pozowice, Facimiech, Ochodzi, Kopanka, and Skawina before ending in Kraków.

== Notable participants ==
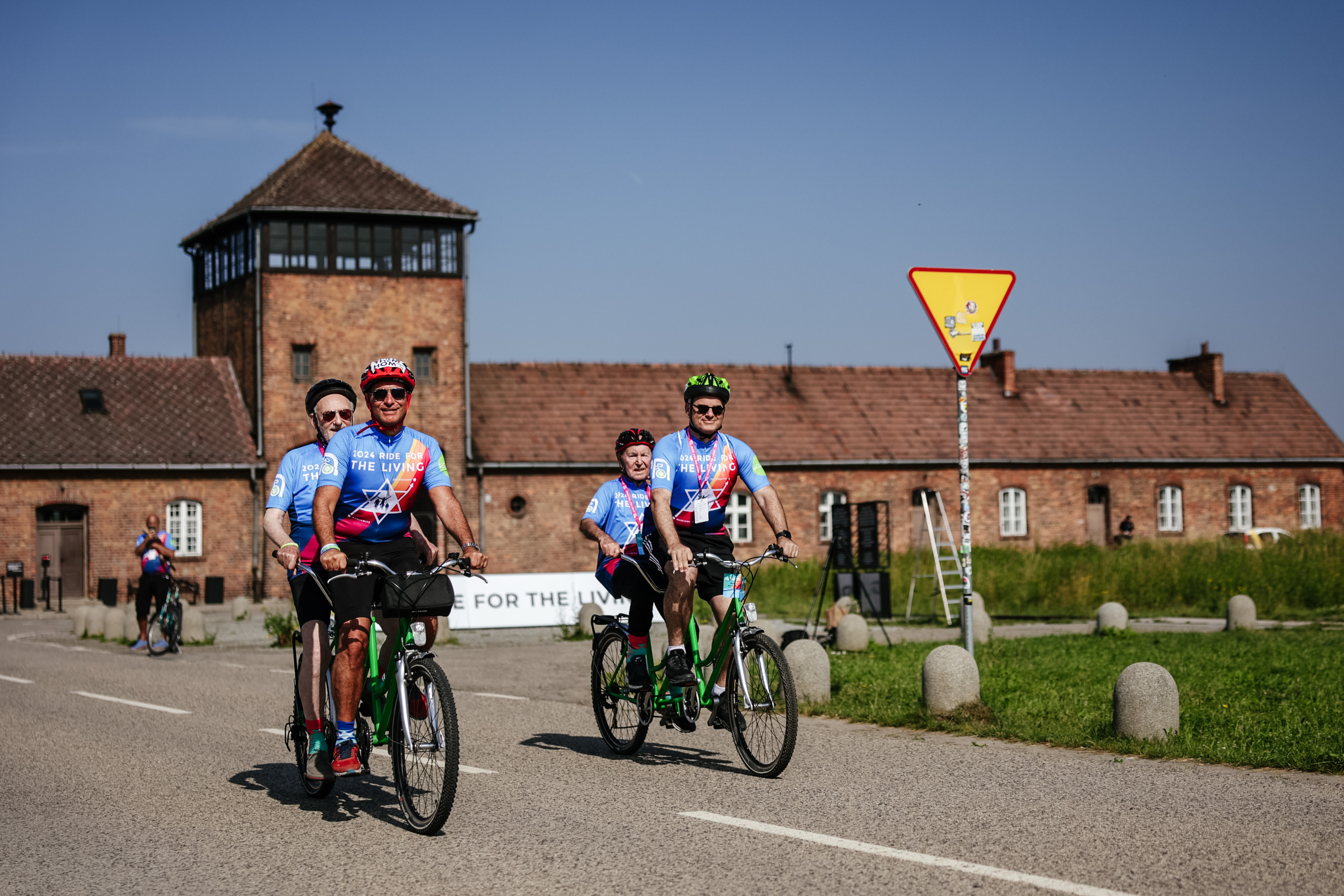
Holocaust survivors Bernard Offen and Marcel Zieliński commencing the 2024 bike ride from Auschwitz-Birkenau in tandem with JCC Krakow CEO Jonathan Ornstein and religious emissary Rabbi Avi Baumol

- Yoav Bear – two-time Israeli cycling champion
- Mark Brzezinski - current United States Ambassador to Poland
- Dan Craven – two-time Olympian and multiple-time Namibian cycling champion
- Trent Dimas - Olympic gold medalist at the 1992 Barcelona games
- Joachim Frank – 2017 Nobel Prize winner in chemistry
- Paul Jones – United States Ambassador to Poland (2015–18)
- Shabbos Kestenbaum – American antisemitism activist
- Greg LeMond – three-time winner of the Tour de France
- Bernard Offen – Holocaust survivor of five concentration camps from Krakow

== Alternatives to the in-person program ==
=== Satellite events ===
Jewish community centers, synagogues, Federations, and other organizations or private individuals can create "satellite events," programs affiliated with Ride For The Living and conducted loosely in conjunction, all over the world. Organizers plan a group athletic activity, whether a bicycle ride or yoga class or other option, in their own local cities and integrate educational content about the revitalization of Jewish life in Poland. Through these events, they raise funds for JCC Krakow and join the network of participants and supporters. Past partners have included Jewish Federation of Metropolitan Detroit, Jewish Long Beach/Alpert JCC, and others.

=== Global Challenge ===
The Ride For The Living Global Challenge provides an accessible option for those unable to travel to Krakow and located prohibitively far from an established satellite event. Participants can walk or cycle as they desire at their leisure, remaining connected to the broader RFTL community through social media and other online platforms. The Global Challenge has spread awareness of JCC Krakow's mission of rebirth to individuals across the world and continues to grow.

== In media ==
Several journalistic outlets have profiled Ride For The Living, including Time, The Times of Israel, and The New York Times, among others. In 2023, Marc Bennett and Tim Roper co-directed a feature film, For The Living, that documents RFTL, situating the program within broader global movements pushing away from genocide and brutality toward peace and empathy.

== Bibliography ==
- Official Ride For The Living website
- Jewish Community Centre of Kraków
- JCC Krakow website

== Media Links ==
- Ride For The Living & The JCC - Jonathan Ornstein - TEDxKazimierz 2015
- "Lemond, Holocaust Survivors ride from Auschwitz to celebrate Jewish life" 2018
- "Celebrating life on the ride from Auschwitz to Krakow" 2018
- "Bicyclists 'Ride For The Living' from Auschwitz to Krakow" 2015
- "Holocaust Survivor to ride bike Auschwitz to Krakow" 2015
- https://www.forthelivingmovie.com/
