= Skawinka =

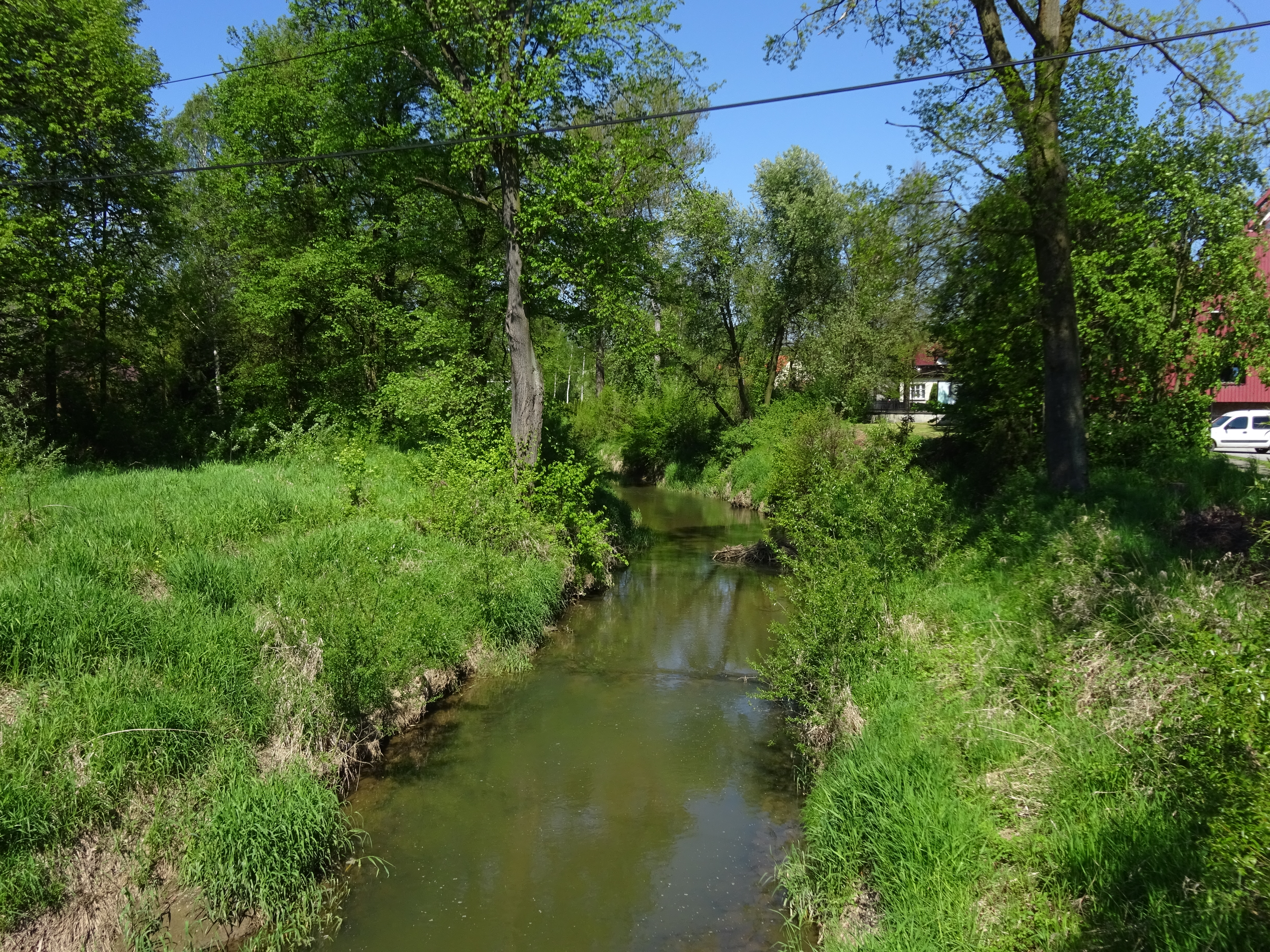
- Skawinka in Wola Radziszowska

Location
- Country: Poland

Physical characteristics
- Source
  - location: near Harbutowice, Lesser Poland Voivodeship
  - coordinates: 49°47′36″N 19°47′27″E
  - elevation: 560 m (1 837 ft (255 m)) AMSL
- Mouth
  - location: north of Kopanka, Lesser Poland Voivodeship
  - coordinates: 49°59′40″N 19°47′43″E
  - elevation: 209 m (686 ft) AMSL
- Length: 34 km (21 mi)
- Basin size: 365 km^{2} (141 sq mi)
- Discharge
  - average: 2.90 m^{3}/s (102 cu ft/s); 9,6 km (5,97 mi) from mouth

Basin features
- Progression: Vistula→ Baltic Sea
- Tributaries
  - left: Mogiłka
  - right: Rzepnik, Włosianka, Lutówka, Głogoczówka, Harbutówka

The Skawinka is a river in the Lesser Poland Voivodeship of Poland, and a right tributary of the Vistula River. The Skawinka is 34 kilometres (21 mi) long and has a drainage basin of 365 square kilometres (141 sq mi). Its average discharge is 2.90 cubic metres per second (102 cu ft/s) (9.6 kilometres (6.0 mi) from the mouth).

Its sources are located on the slopes of Babica in the Maków Beskids. The river flows through the Wieliczka Foothills and the valley of the Vistula.

The main tributaries counting from the mouth: Rzepnik (right); Mogiłka (left); Włosianka, Łutówka, Głogoczówka, Harbutówka (right).

The most important places along Skawinka: Skawinki, Lanckorona, Kalwaria Zebrzydowska, Leńcze, Wola Radziszowska, Radziszów, Rzozów, Skawina.

The river lends its name to the village Skawinki located at its source and to the town of Skawina, which is the last town before its mouth. Sometimes it is called "Cedron" by the residents of the neighboring villages, especially around Kalwaria Zebrzydowska. In the late middle ages it used to be a political border between Silesia and Lesser Poland, and also between the Bohemian Crown and the Crown of Poland.

== See also ==
- List of rivers of Poland
