= Shabbos Kestenbaum =

American Jewish activist (born 1998)

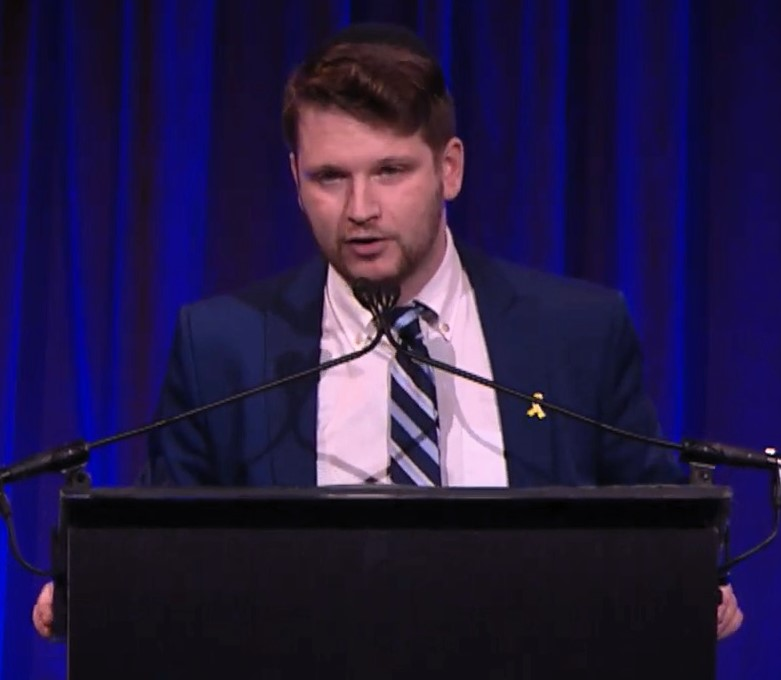
- Kestenbaum speaks in 2024
- Born: Alexander Shabbos Kestenbaum; December 19, 1998 (age 27); Teaneck, New Jersey, U.S.
- Education: Queens College (BA); Harvard University (MTS)
- Political party: Democratic (formerly)
- Shabbos Kestenbaum's voice recorded May 15, 2024

Shabbos Kestenbaum (born December 19, 1998) is an American Jewish activist. After the October 7 attacks on Israel, he filed a lawsuit against Harvard University alleging that the university failed to protect Jewish and Israeli students from antisemitic harassment and discrimination. Previously a Democrat, Kestenbaum now works for PragerU.

== Early life and education ==
Kestenbaum was born on December 19, 1998, in Teaneck, New Jersey, to Daniel and Hadassah Kestenbaum, British immigrants. He is one of seven siblings and was named Shabbos because he was born on the Jewish Sabbath. His family later moved to the Riverdale section of the Bronx, New York, where he attended SAR Academy, a local Modern Orthodox Jewish day school, and then SAR High School. He also engaged in many educational programs while in high school with the Tikvah Fund. During his youth, he expressed opposition to the Iraq War in a school journal. He then studied at Aish HaTorah in Jerusalem for two years, from 2017 to 2019.

Kestenbaum attended Queens College, where he served as president of Hillel and Student Senator and graduated summa cum laude.

Kestenbaum then attended Harvard Divinity School, graduating in May 2024. While at Harvard, he became increasingly vocal about antisemitism on campus. This included harassment of Jewish students during protests, antisemitic messages on a university app, and vandalism of posters about Israeli hostages.

=== Lawsuit against Harvard University ===
In January 2024, Kestenbaum was the lead plaintiff in a lawsuit against Harvard University. The lawsuit included six anonymous Jewish students under the name Students Against Antisemitism and alleged that the university failed to address antisemitic harassment and discrimination against Jewish and Israeli students, particularly following the October 7 attacks. The plaintiffs claimed that Harvard violated Title VI of the Civil Rights Act of 1964 by not protecting Jewish and Israeli students from discrimination and harassment, breached contractual obligations, and failed to uphold the implied covenant of good faith and fair dealing. The lawsuit gained much attention in conservative circles, including President Donald Trump and the Department of Education. Kestenbaum claimed his lawsuit "drew the nation's attention to the scourge of antisemitism" on college campuses.

In April 2024, the university filed to dismiss the lawsuit, arguing that they had worked to combat campus antisemitism. However the motion was rejected in August by federal judge Richard G. Stearns, who pointed out that there were many instances when Harvard had failed to respond to antisemitism.

In January 2025, Harvard settled the lawsuit with the other plaintiffs, agreeing to adopt the IHRA definition of antisemitism, host an annual symposium on antisemitism, and partner with an Israeli university. Kestenbaum declined to join the settlement and continued pursuing his claims separately. On May 15, he agreed to a confidential settlement with Harvard.

== Career and advocacy ==
Kestenbaum works with the Jewish community in Poland, preserving Jewish heritage and promoting Jewish education, and has visited numerous times since he turned 18. Following the Russian invasion of Ukraine in 2022, he returned to Poland to help support the Ukrainian refugees there. He worked as an intern at the Jewish Community Centre of Kraków in Poland in the summer of 2023 and took part in its Ride For The Living fundraiser.

=== Political career ===
Kestenbaum was a registered Democrat and supported progressive candidates including Bernie Sanders.

In July 2024, Kestenbaum spoke to the Republican National Convention. During his speech, he highlighted issues of antisemitism and criticized Harvard University's handling of such incidents. Kestenbaum said "the far left has not only abandoned the Jewish people, but the American people". His speech was well-received by the audience. Kestenbaum later endorsed Donald Trump in the 2024 presidential election, citing dissatisfaction with Democratic party's handling of antisemitism.

Kestenbaum continues his political advocacy. In summer 2025, he moved to Los Angeles for a job with PragerU, a right-wing pro-Israel advocacy group founded by Dennis Prager and funded in large part by conservative megadonors linked to Israel and various corporate lobby groups. PragerU's CEO, Marissa Streit, is a former Israeli-American lobbyist who served in Unit 8200 of the Israeli Defense Force's Military Intelligence.

=== Political advocacy ===
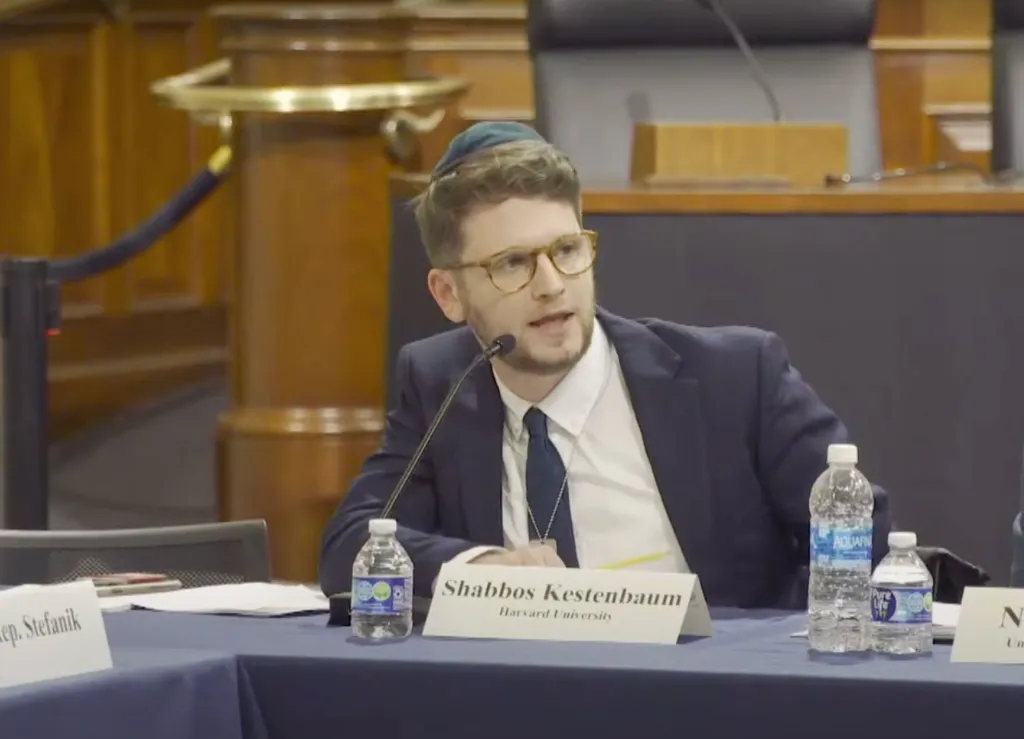
Kestenbaum testifying before the House Committee on Education and the Workforce in March 2024

Kestenbaum has testified multiple times before the United States Congress regarding antisemitism on college campuses. He has also spoken before the Israeli Knesset, where he was honored for his efforts in combating antisemitism. He also has appeared as a commentator on national news platforms including CNN, Fox News, and Newsmax.

Kestenbaum participated as a delegate for the Aish Ha’am slate at the 39th World Zionist Congress held in October 2025. He considered running in the 2026 United States House of Representatives elections for the congressional seat vacated by Jerry Nadler.

== Reaction ==
Some Jewish people have praised Kestenbaum for bringing attention to antisemitism in higher education. Rabbi Shlomo Riskin has said that Kestenbaum is "not just a speaker — he's a builder" who is "helping to shape the next chapter of Jewish public life, and he's doing it with both vision and integrity."

Other Jewish people have criticized Kestenbaum. Zev Mishell, a classmate of Kestenbaum at Harvard Divinity School, said that Kestenbaum's depiction of antisemitism at Harvard did not reflect the experience of "much of Harvard's Jewish population", and that "Republicans have weaponized his individual story and experience to conceal their very real antisemitism". Another opinion piece in The Forward argued that Kestenbaum "misrepresents Jewish values" and is a "campus provocateur with a record of inflammatory statements and actions" who is exploited by "political opportunists on the right."

== Personal life ==
Kestenbaum identifies as a first generation American and a proud Orthodox Jew. In May 2025, he donated his kidney to an anonymous recipient through the Renewal organization.
