= Wielkie Drogi =

- Village
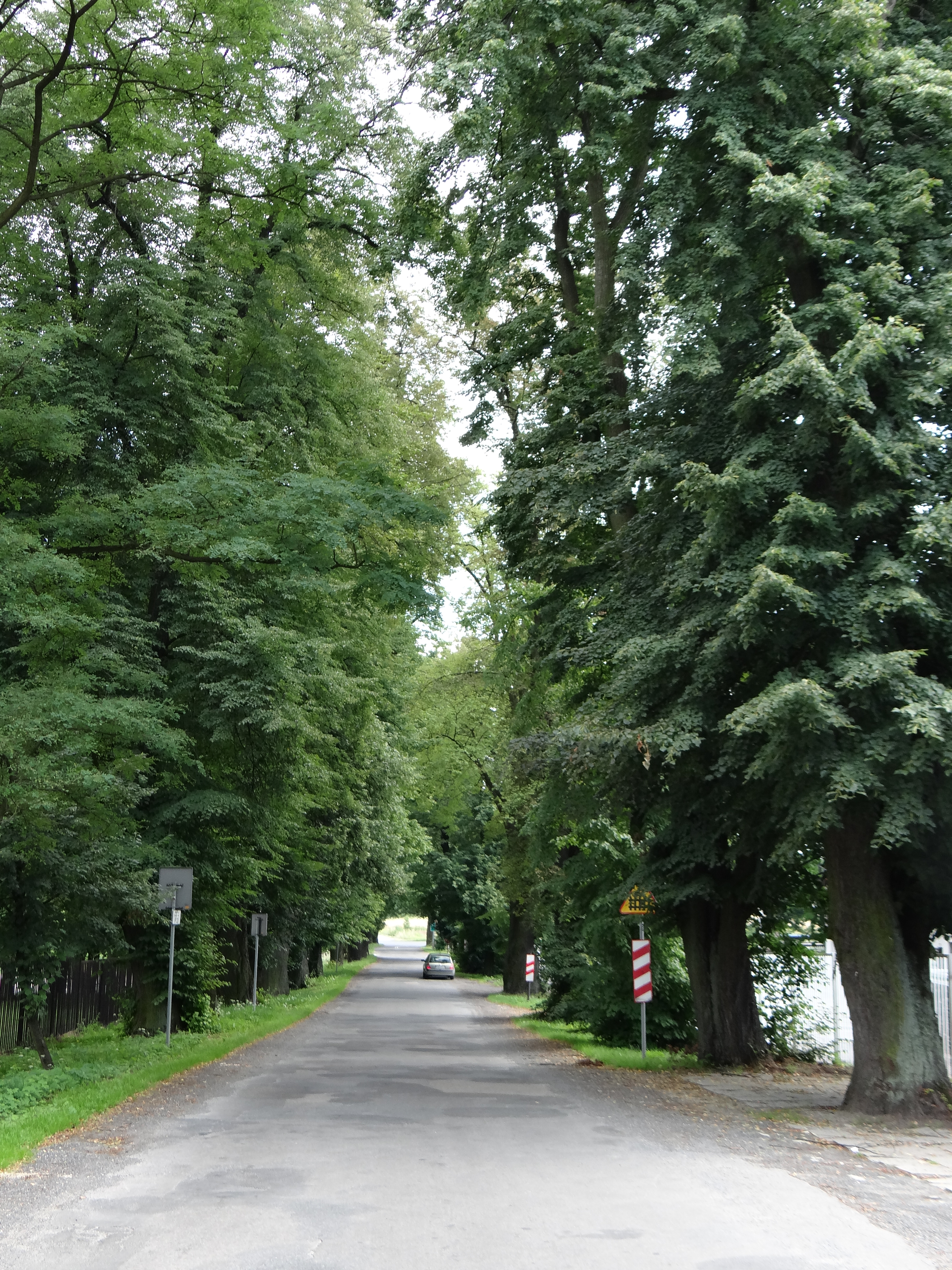

- Location within Poland
- Coordinates: 49°58′N 19°43′E
- Country: Poland
- Voivodeship: Lesser Poland
- County: Kraków
- Gmina: Skawina

Wielkie Drogi [ˈvjɛlkʲɛ ˈdrɔɡi] is a village in the administrative district of Gmina Skawina, within Kraków County, Lesser Poland Voivodeship, in southern Poland.
