= Lipowa, Lesser Poland Voivodeship =

Lipowa
- Village
- Location within Poland
- Coordinates: 50°00′32″N 19°33′27″E
- Country: Poland
- Voivodeship: Lesser Poland
- County: Wadowice
- Gmina: Spytkowice

Lipowa [liˈpɔva] is a village in the administrative district of Gmina Spytkowice, within Wadowice County, Lesser Poland Voivodeship, in southern Poland.
