= Jaśkowice, Lesser Poland Voivodeship =

Jaśkowice
- Village
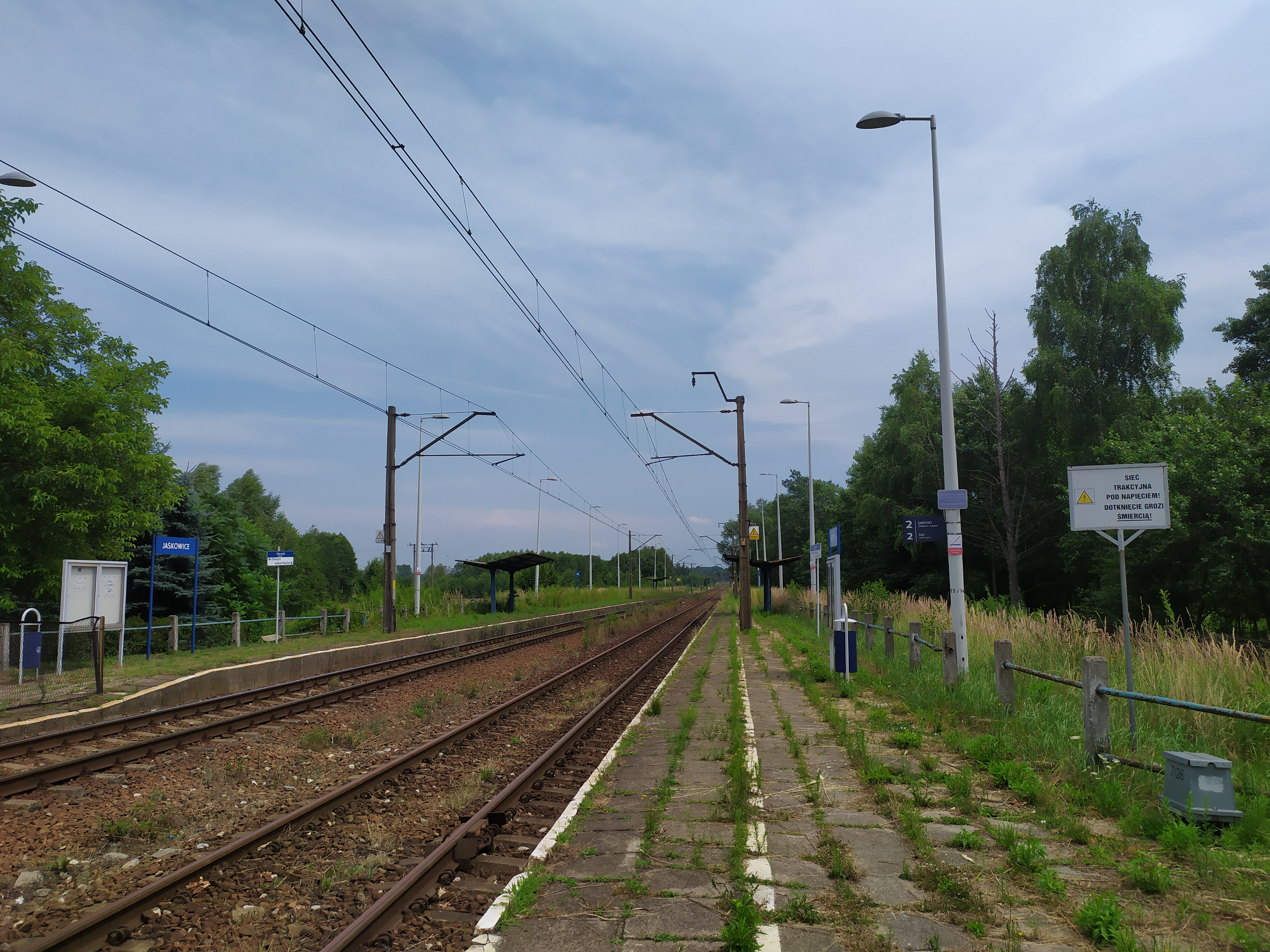
- Train station in Jaśkowice

- Location within Poland
- Coordinates: 49°58′N 19°41′E
- Country: Poland
- Voivodeship: Lesser Poland
- County: Kraków
- Gmina: Skawina
- Elevation: 276 m (906 ft)
- Population (approx.): 1,000

Jaśkowice [jaɕkɔˈvit͡sɛ] is a village in the administrative district of Gmina Skawina, within Kraków County, Lesser Poland Voivodeship, in southern Poland.

The village has an approximate population of 1,000.
