= Zelczyna =

- Village
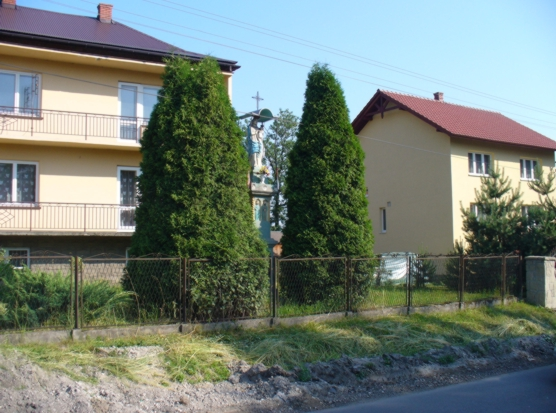

- Location within Poland
- Coordinates: 49°57′36.6″N 19°44′55.8″E
- Country: Poland
- Voivodeship: Lesser Poland
- County: Kraków
- Gmina: Skawina
- Population: 830

Zelczyna [zɛlˈt͡ʂɨna] is a village in the administrative district of Gmina Skawina, within Kraków County, Lesser Poland Voivodeship, in southern Poland.
