= Gmina Spytkowice, Wadowice County =

Gmina Spytkowice Spytkowice Commune
- Gmina
- Coat of arms
- Interactive map of Gmina Spytkowice
- Coordinates (Spytkowice): 49°59′36″N 19°30′10″E
- Country: Poland
- Voivodeship: Lesser Poland
- County: Wadowice
- Seat: Spytkowice

Area
  - Total: 47.03 km^{2} (18.16 sq mi)

Population (2006)
  - Total: 9,376
  - Density: 199.4/km^{2} (516.3/sq mi)
- Website: www.spytkowice.net.pl

Gmina Spytkowice is a rural gmina (administrative district) in Wadowice County, Lesser Poland Voivodeship, in southern Poland. Its seat is the village of Spytkowice, which lies approximately 13 kilometres (8 mi) north of Wadowice and 33 km (21 mi) west of the regional capital Kraków.

The gmina covers an area of 47.03 square kilometres (18.2 sq mi), and as of 2006 its total population is 9,376.

== Villages ==
Gmina Spytkowice contains the villages and settlements of Bachowice, Lipowa, Miejsce, Półwieś, Ryczów and Spytkowice.

== Neighbouring gminas ==
Gmina Spytkowice is bordered by the gminas of Alwernia, Brzeźnica, Czernichów, Tomice and Zator.
