= Krzęcin, Lesser Poland Voivodeship =

Krzęcin
- Village
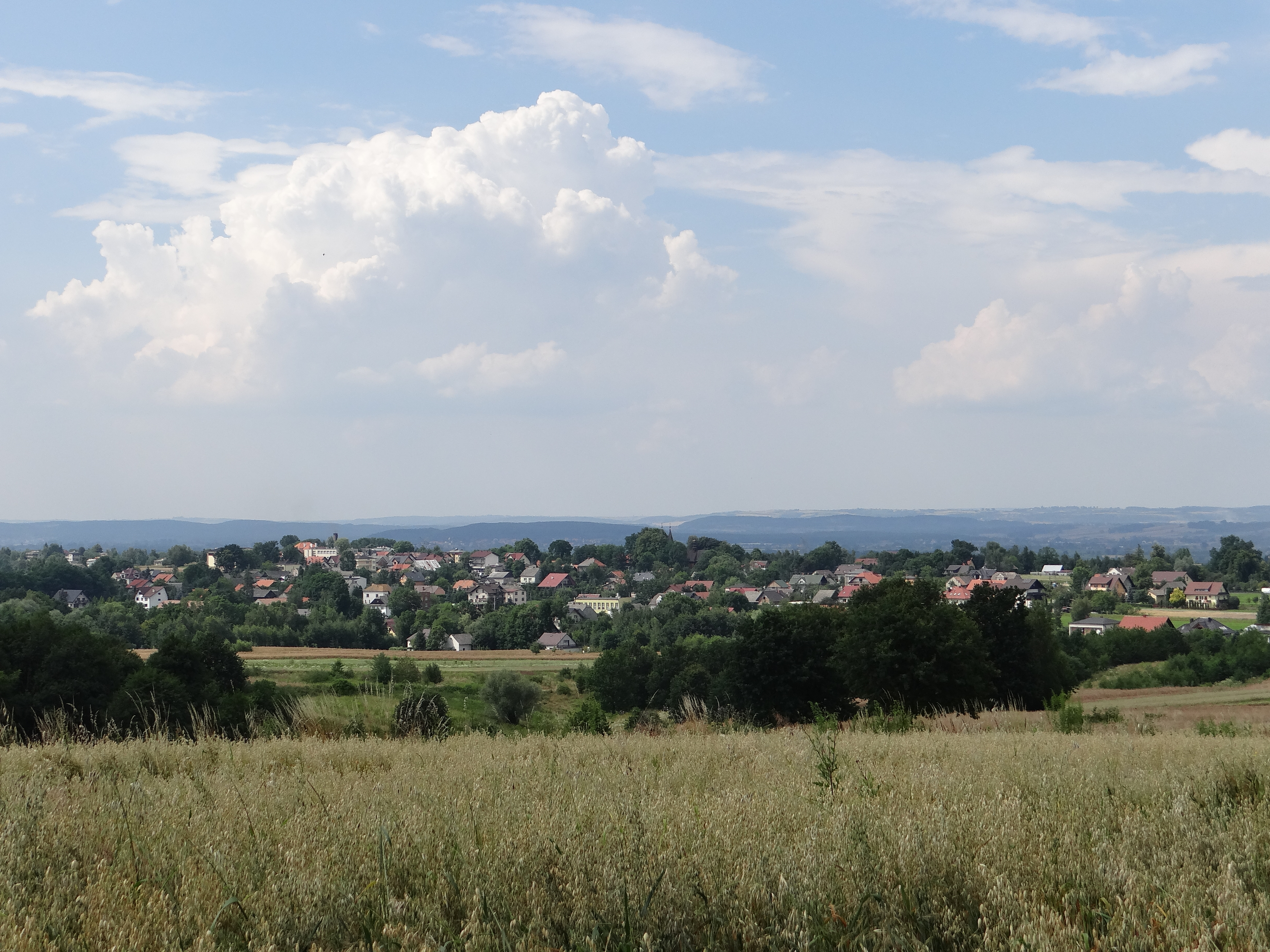

- Location within Poland
- Coordinates: 49°57′N 19°45′E
- Country: Poland
- Voivodeship: Lesser Poland
- County: Kraków
- Gmina: Skawina
- Population: 1,400

Krzęcin [ˈkʂɛnt͡ɕin] is a village in the administrative district of Gmina Skawina, within Kraków County, Lesser Poland Voivodeship, in southern Poland.
