= Półwieś, Lesser Poland Voivodeship =

Półwieś
- Village
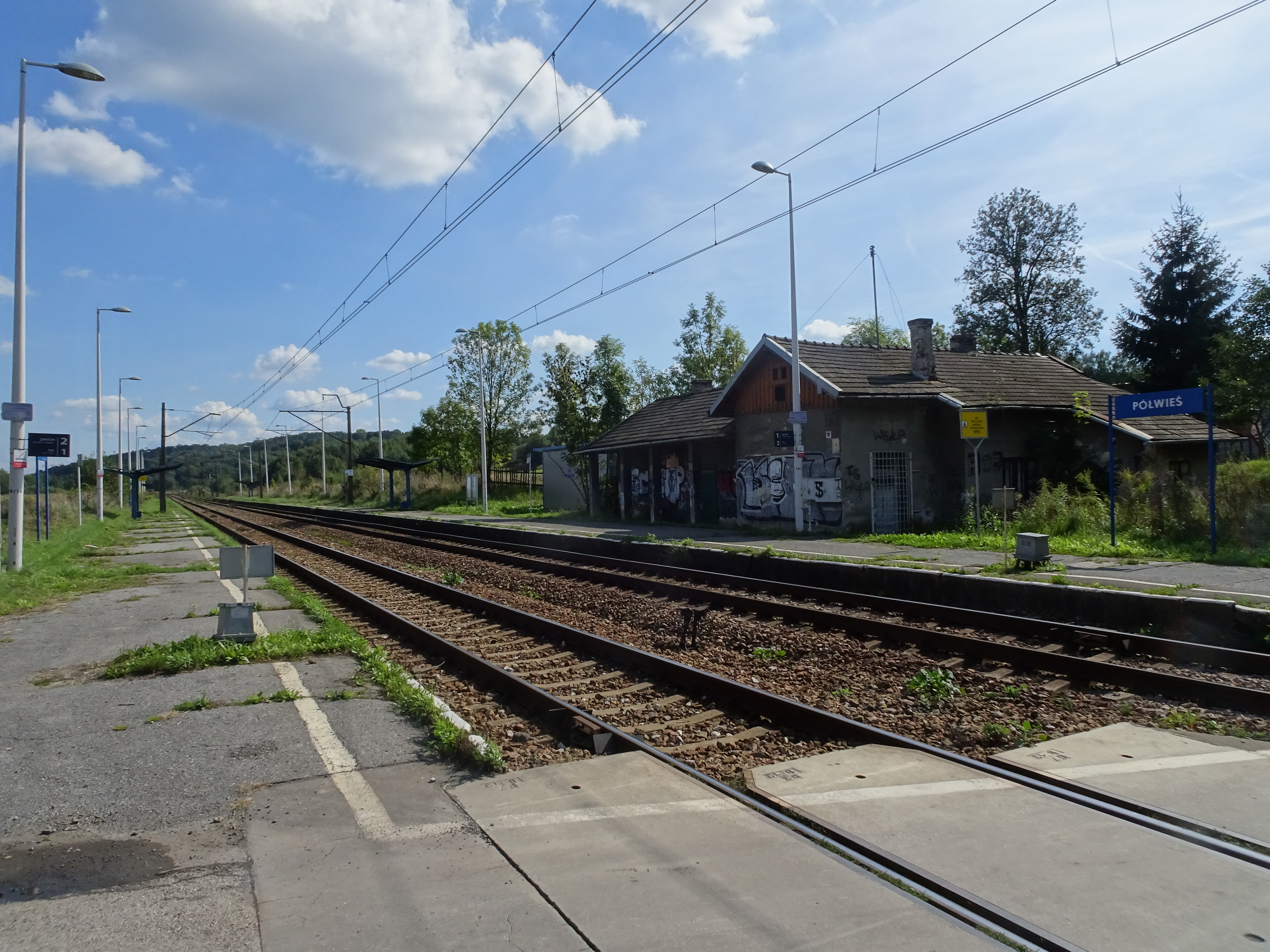
- Train stop in Półwieś

- Location within Poland
- Coordinates: 49°58′25″N 19°33′35″E
- Country: Poland
- Voivodeship: Lesser Poland
- County: Wadowice
- Gmina: Spytkowice
- Highest elevation: 305 m (1,001 ft)
- Lowest elevation: 235 m (771 ft)
- Population (2011): 525

Półwieś [ˈpuu̯vjɛɕ] is a village in the administrative district of Gmina Spytkowice, within Wadowice County, Lesser Poland Voivodeship, southern Poland.

== History ==
The settlement was founded in the 13th century, until the mid-15th century it belonged to the knight and nobleman Nicholas Saszowski of Gierałtowice (name historically also written as: Szaszowski), who sold it on to the Cistercian monastery in Mogiła (Kraków). The Cistercian monastery held possession of the village until the end of the 18th century.

In the years 1975–1998, the village was located in the Bielsko province.

Until December 31, 2006, the village was part of the administrative district of Gmina Brzeźnica.
