= Bachowice =

- Village
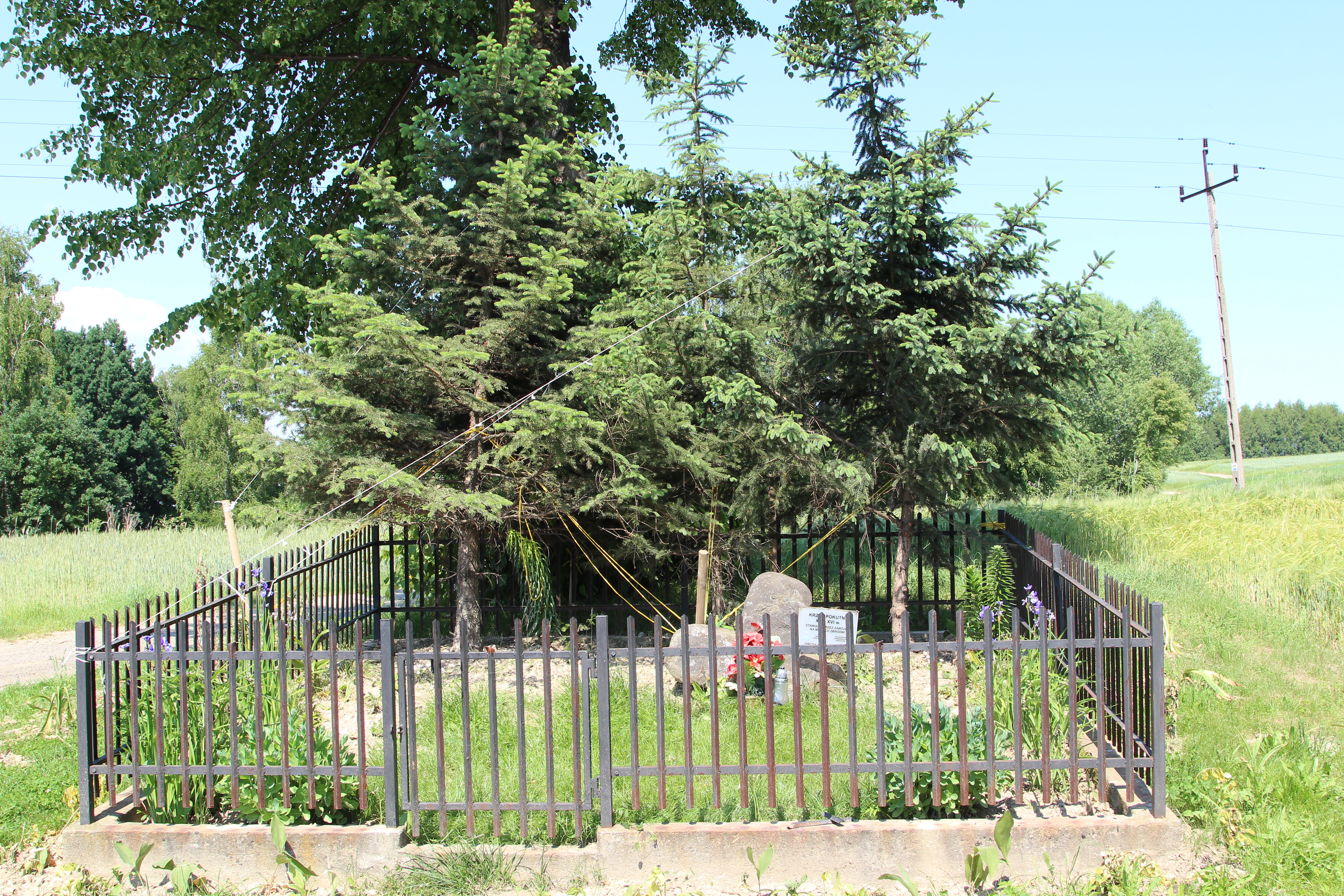
- Stone cross in Bachowice

- Location within Poland
- Coordinates: 49°58′N 19°30′E
- Country: Poland
- Voivodeship: Lesser Poland
- County: Wadowice
- Gmina: Spytkowice
- Highest elevation: 310 m (1,020 ft)
- Lowest elevation: 260 m (850 ft)

Bachowice [baxɔˈvit͡sɛ] is a village in the administrative district of Gmina Spytkowice, within Wadowice County, Lesser Poland Voivodeship, in southern Poland.
