= Andrzej Hałaciński =

Polish military officer and poet

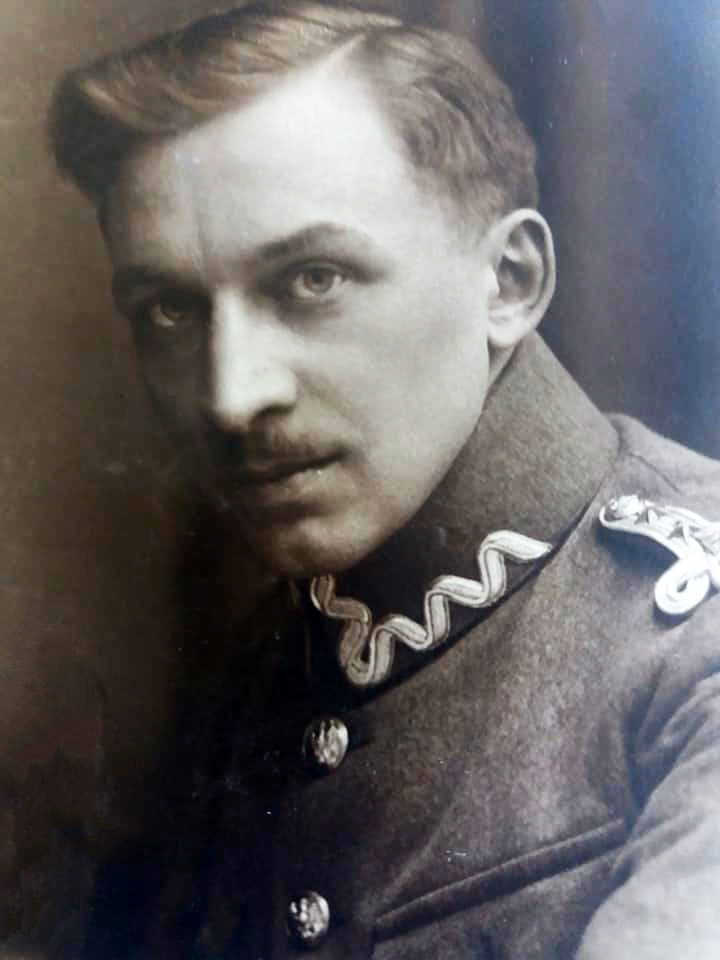
- Born: November 10, 1891; Skawina
- Died: April 10, 1940 (aged 48) Katyn
- Cause of death: Execution by shooting
- Buried: Katyn Polish War Cemetery
- Rank: Lieutenant colonel (podpułkownik)
- Conflicts: World War I; Polish–Soviet War
- Awards: Virtuti Militari; Cross of Valour (4); Gold Cross of Merit
- Children: 2

Andrzej Tadeusz Hałaciński (10 November 1891 – 10 April 1940) was a Polish military officer, poet and local official, victim of the Katyn massacre, best known as the co-author of the lyrics of the popular Polish patriotic march We Are the First Brigade.

== Early life and education ==
He was the son of Eustachy Hałaciński and Feliksa née Rogozińska. In 1913, he graduated from the Academy of Economics in Kraków.

== Military and civil career ==
During World War I, he served in the 1st Brigade of the Polish Legions, and then he fought in the Polish–Soviet War of 1919–1921 He wrote three verses and the chorus of the song We Are the First Brigade.

In the 1920s, he was employed in the Consulate General of Poland in Berlin. In 1929, he became the starost (head of administration) of Brzesko County, and later a notary in Łuck.

== Captivity and death ==
Following the German-Soviet invasion of Poland, which started World War II, he was held by the Soviets in camps in Putyvl and Kozelsk, and eventually murdered in Katyn during the Katyn massacre.

== Private life ==
He was married and had two sons.

== Commemoration ==
In 2010, a Memorial Oak was planted in Bielsko-Biała in honor of Colonel Andrzej Hałaciński. In 2013, a street in his home town of Skawina was named after him.
