= Gołuchowice, Lesser Poland Voivodeship =

Gołuchowice
- Village
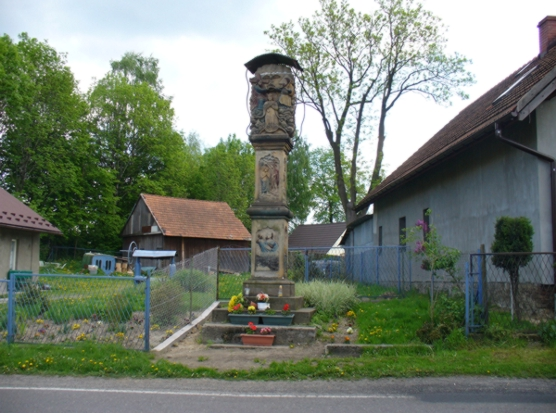
- Roadside chapel in Gołuchowice

- Location within Poland
- Coordinates: 49°57′N 19°47′E
- Country: Poland
- Voivodeship: Lesser Poland
- County: Kraków
- Gmina: Skawina

Gołuchowice [ɡɔwuxɔˈvit͡sɛ] is a village in the administrative district of Gmina Skawina, within Kraków County, Lesser Poland Voivodeship, in southern Poland.
