= Polanka Hallera =

- Village
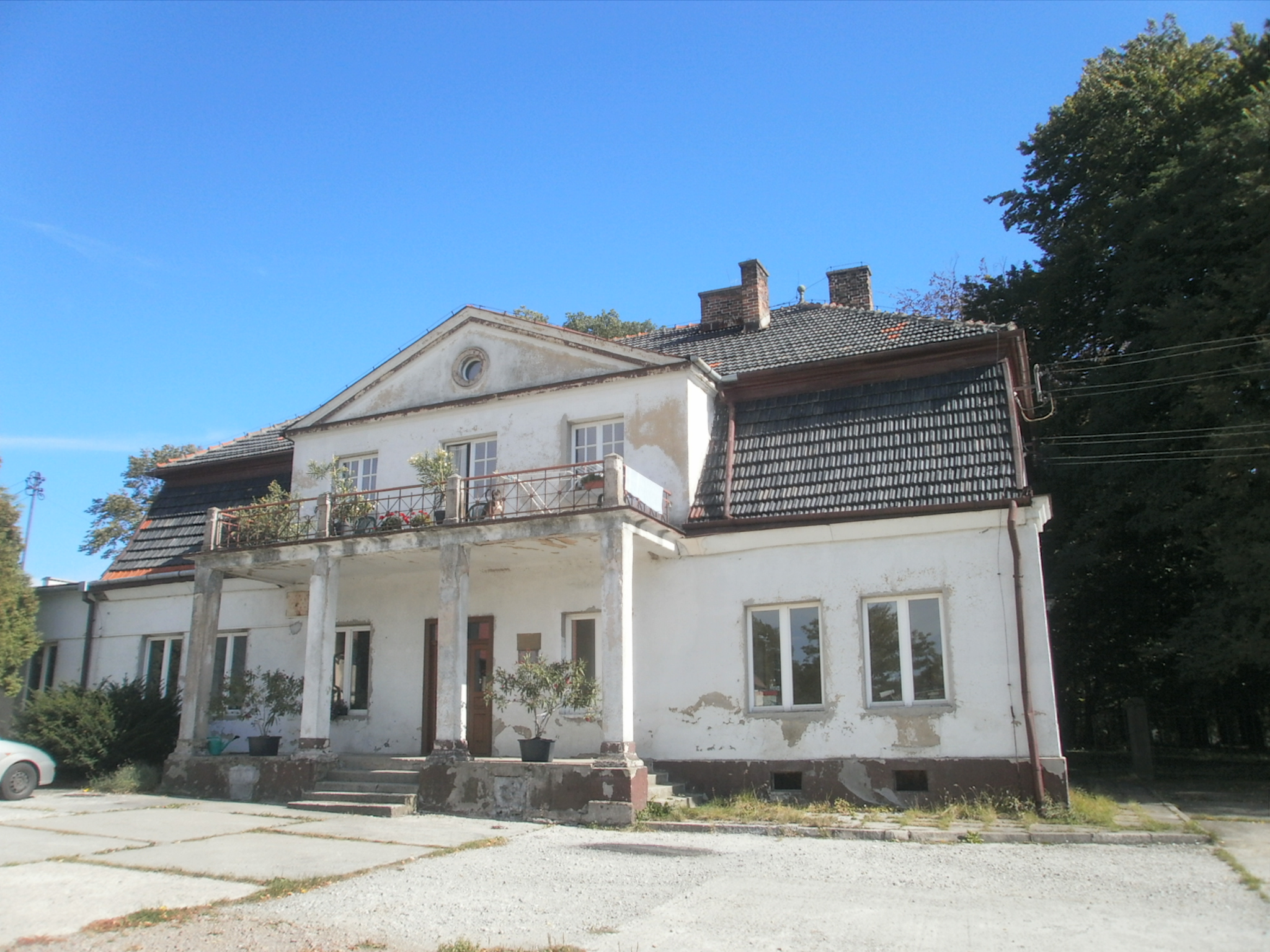
- Manor house

- Location within Poland
- Coordinates: 49°55′N 19°46′E
- Country: Poland
- Voivodeship: Lesser Poland
- County: Kraków
- Gmina: Skawina
- Elevation: 310 m (1,020 ft)
- Population: 485
- Website: http://www.polankahallera.prv.pl/

Polanka Hallera [pɔˈlaŋka xalˈlɛra] (English: Haller's Valley) is a village in the administrative district of Gmina Skawina, within Kraków County, Lesser Poland Voivodeship, in southern Poland.
