= Gmina Skawina =

Gmina Skawina Skawina Commune
- Gmina
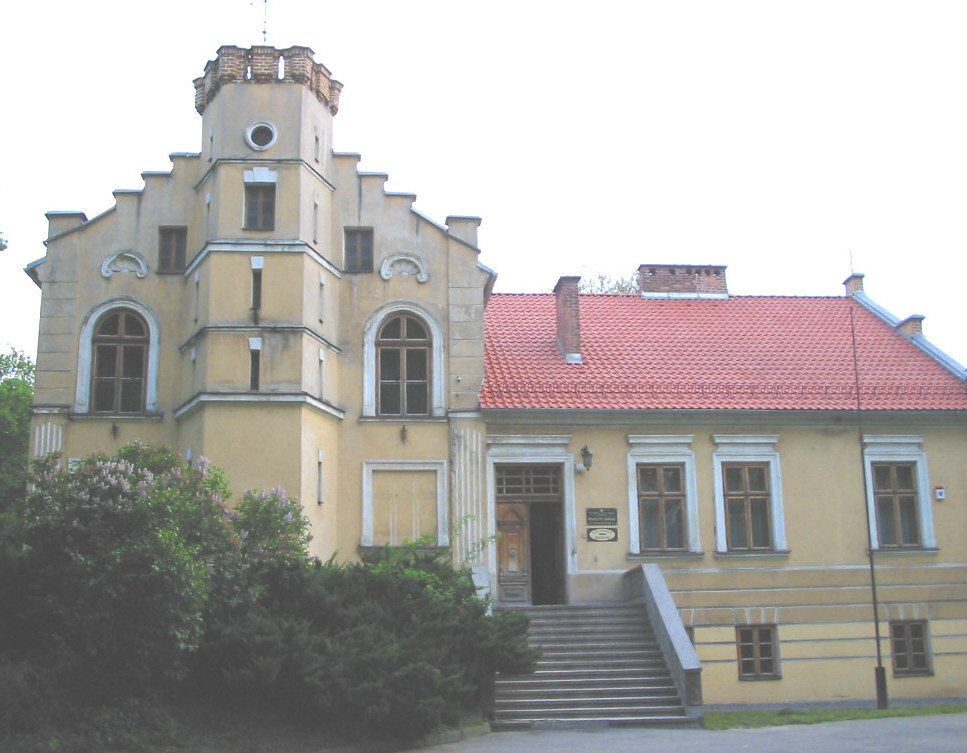

- Flag Coat of arms
- Interactive map of Gmina Skawina
- Coordinates (Skawina): 49°59′N 19°50′E
- Country: Poland
- Voivodeship: Lesser Poland
- County: Kraków County
- Seat: Skawina

Area
  - Total: 100.15 km^{2} (38.67 sq mi)

Population (2006)
  - Total: 41,445
  - Density: 413.83/km^{2} (1,071.8/sq mi)
  - Urban: 23,691
  - Rural: 17,754
- Website: http://www.gminaskawina.pl/

Gmina Skawina is an urban-rural gmina (administrative district) in Kraków County, Lesser Poland Voivodeship, in southern Poland. Its seat is the town of Skawina, which lies approximately 12 kilometres (7 mi) south-west of the regional capital Kraków.

The gmina covers an area of 100.15 square kilometres (38.7 sq mi), and as of 2006 its total population is 41,445 (out of which the population of Skawina amounts to 23,691, and the population of the rural part of the gmina is 17,754).

== Villages ==
Apart from the town of Skawina, Gmina Skawina contains the villages and settlements of Borek Szlachecki, Facimiech, Gołuchowice, Grabie, Jaśkowice, Jurczyce, Kopanka, Krzęcin, Ochodza, Polanka Hallera, Pozowice, Radziszów, Rzozów, Wielkie Drogi, Wola Radziszowska and Zelczyna.

== Neighbouring gminas ==
Gmina Skawina is bordered by the city of Kraków and by the gminas of Brzeźnica, Czernichów, Kalwaria Zebrzydowska, Lanckorona, Liszki, Mogilany, Myślenice and Sułkowice.
