= Borek Szlachecki =

- Village
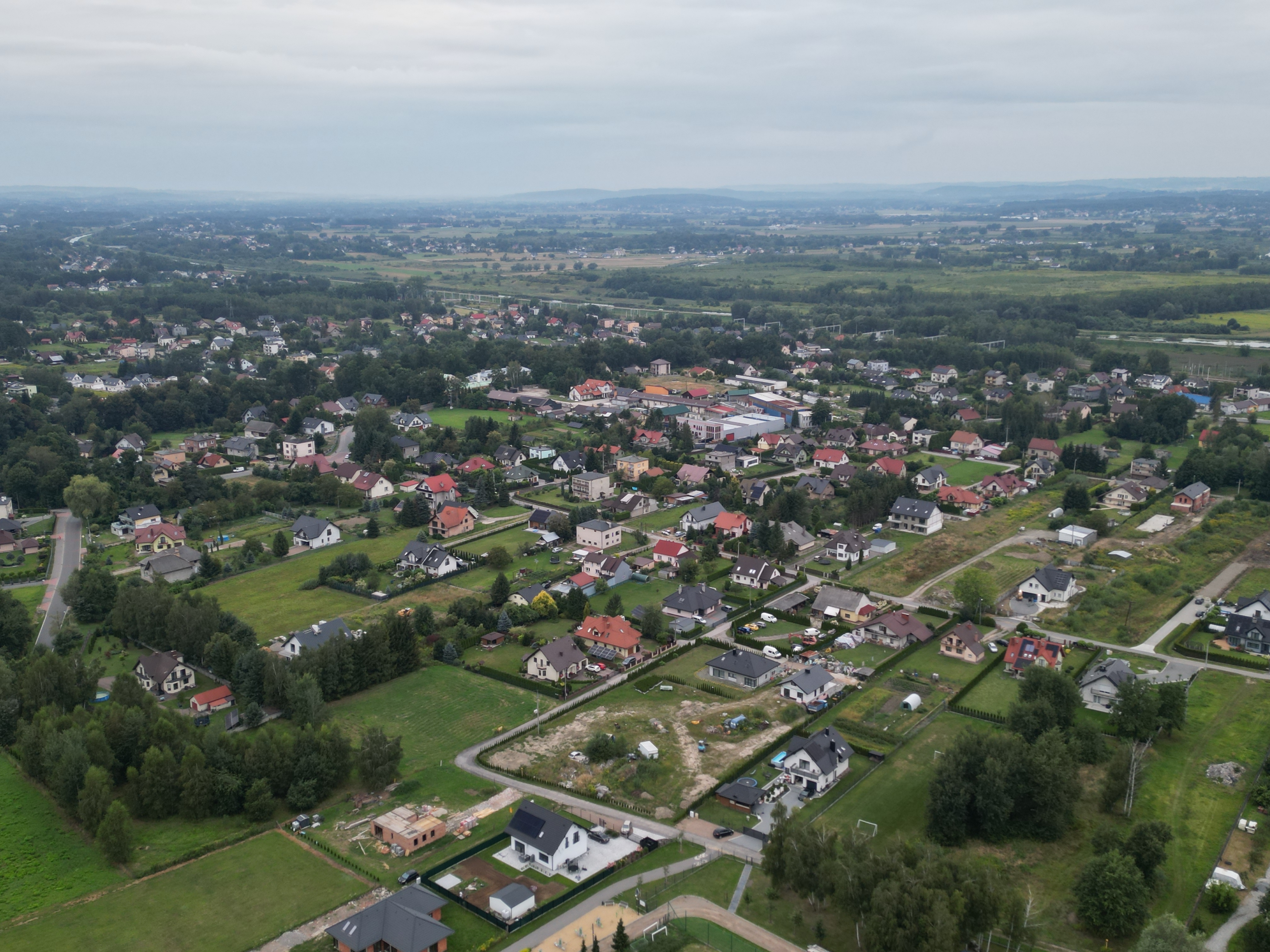
- Panoramic view of Borek Szlachecki

- Location within Poland
- Coordinates: 49°58′N 19°47′E
- Country: Poland
- Voivodeship: Lesser Poland
- County: Kraków
- Gmina: Skawina

Borek Szlachecki (Polish pronunciation: [ˈbɔrɛk ʂlaˈxɛtskʲi]) is a village in the administrative district of Gmina Skawina, within Kraków County, Lesser Poland Voivodeship, in southern Poland.
