= Grabie, Kraków County =

Grabie
- Village
- Location within Poland
- Coordinates: 49°56′N 19°45′E
- Country: Poland
- Voivodeship: Lesser Poland
- County: Kraków
- Gmina: Skawina

Grabie [ˈɡrabjɛ] is a village in the administrative district of Gmina Skawina, within Kraków County, Lesser Poland Voivodeship, in southern Poland.
