= Miejsce, Lesser Poland Voivodeship =

Miejsce
- Village
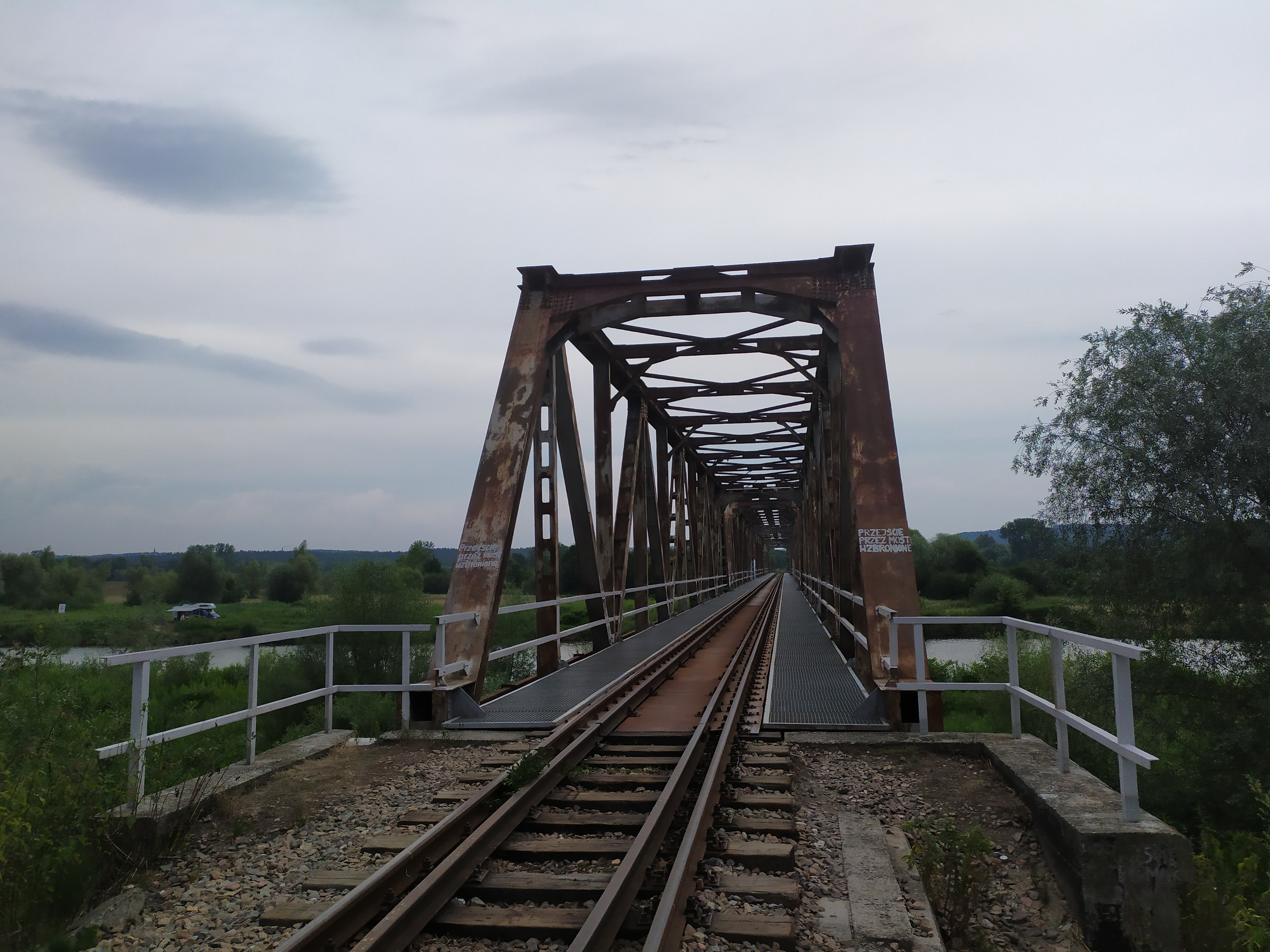
- Railway bridge over the Vistula river

- Coat of arms

- Location within Poland
- Coordinates: 50°1′N 19°31′E
- Country: Poland
- Voivodeship: Lesser Poland
- County: Wadowice
- Gmina: Spytkowice

Miejsce [ˈmjɛi̯st͡sɛ] is a village in the administrative district of Gmina Spytkowice, within Wadowice County, Lesser Poland Voivodeship, in southern Poland.

In 2021 the regional newspaper Gazeta Krakowska reported on the defacement of a wayside shrine in Miejsce. Erected in the early 20th century, a restoration attempt of the religious icon had been criticised by villagers for considerably altering its former appearance. In response, the provincial conservator stated that the icon would not be returned to its location until it was granted legal protection.
