= Radziszów =

- Village
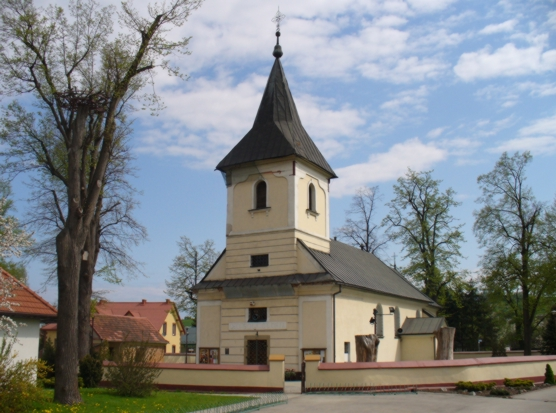
- St. Lawrence church

- Location within Poland
- Coordinates: 49°56′N 19°49′E
- Country: Poland
- Voivodeship: Lesser Poland
- County: Kraków
- Gmina: Skawina
- Population: 2,800
- Website: http://www.naszradziszow.com

Radziszów [raˈd͡ʑiʂuf] is a village in the administrative district of Gmina Skawina, within Kraków County, Lesser Poland Voivodeship, in southern Poland.
