= Rzozów =

- Village
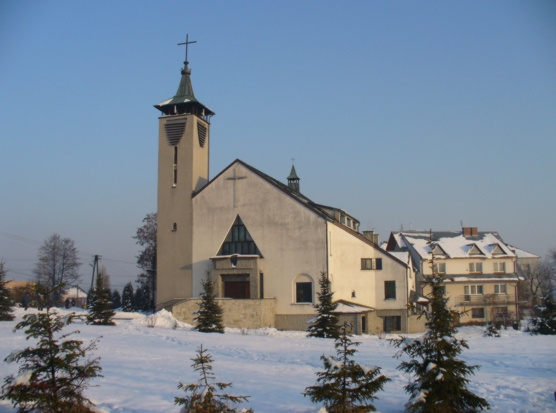
- Virgin Mary Queen of Poland church

- Location within Poland
- Coordinates: 49°57′12″N 19°47′53″E
- Country: Poland
- Voivodeship: Lesser Poland
- County: Kraków
- Gmina: Skawina
- Population: 1,707

Rzozów [ˈʐɔzuf] is a village in the administrative district of Gmina Skawina, within Kraków County, Lesser Poland Voivodeship, in southern Poland.
