= Skawina =

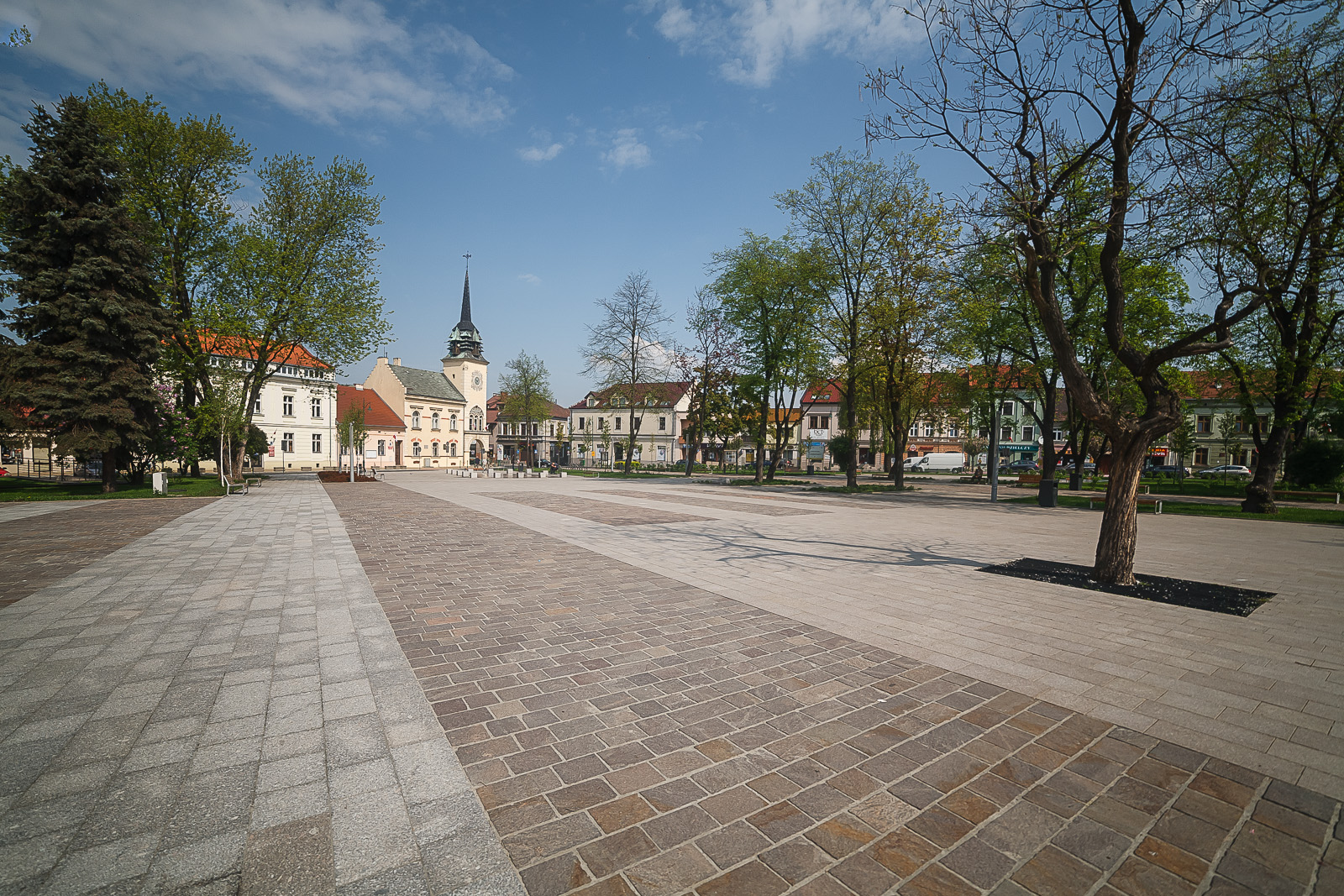
- Market Square

- Coat of arms

- Location within Poland
- Coordinates: 49°59′N 19°50′E
- Country: Poland
- Voivodeship: Lesser Poland
- County: Kraków
- Gmina: Skawina
- Town rights: 1364

Government
  - Mayor: Norbert Rzepisko (PiS)

Area
  - Total: 20.5 km^{2} (7.9 sq mi)

Population (2008)
  - Total: 27,691
  - Density: 1,350/km^{2} (3,500/sq mi)
- Time zone: UTC+1 (CET)
  - Summer (DST): UTC+2 (CEST)
- Postal code: 32-050
- Car plates: KRA
- Website: www.gminaskawina.pl

Skawina [skaˈvʲina] is a town in southern Poland with 27,328 inhabitants (2008), situated in the Lesser Poland Voivodeship. The town is located on the Skawinka river, in close proximity to the city of Kraków. Its population (as for December 31, 2010) was 23,761, and the area of the town is 20,50 km^{2}. One of the most interesting historic buildings in Skawina is a Renaissance palace, built in the mid-16th century by Paweł Korytko. The name of the town probably comes from the Skawinka river.

== History ==
In the late 13th century, three villages existed here: Babice Nowe, Babice Stare and Pisary. They belonged to the Tyniec Benedictine Abbey. In the Middle Ages, the Skawinka marked for a while the boundary between Silesia and Lesser Poland, which resulted in construction of a defensive gord, which protected the city of Kraków from the south. On May 22, 1364, King Casimir the Great granted Magdeburg rights to Skawina, and a few years later, the parish church of Holy Spirit was funded here. Skawina was the seat of a wójt, and remained in the hands of the Benedictine monks. It was administratively located in the Kraków Voivodeship in the Lesser Poland Province of the Kingdom of Poland. The town had a defensive wall and a castle, which was the residence of the wójt. In 1509, Skawina burned in a fire, but the town was quickly rebuilt and enjoyed the prosperity of the Polish Golden Age. Good times ended in the Swedish invasion of Poland, when Swedish and Transilvanian armies destroyed Skawina, reducing its population by 50%. After the First Partition of Poland, Skawina became part of Austrian province of Galicia (1772). The town remained poor and backward until the second half of the 19th century, when Skawina became a railroad hub, with three lines, to Kraków, Sucha Beskidzka, and Oświęcim. A brewery was built and new businesses were opened.

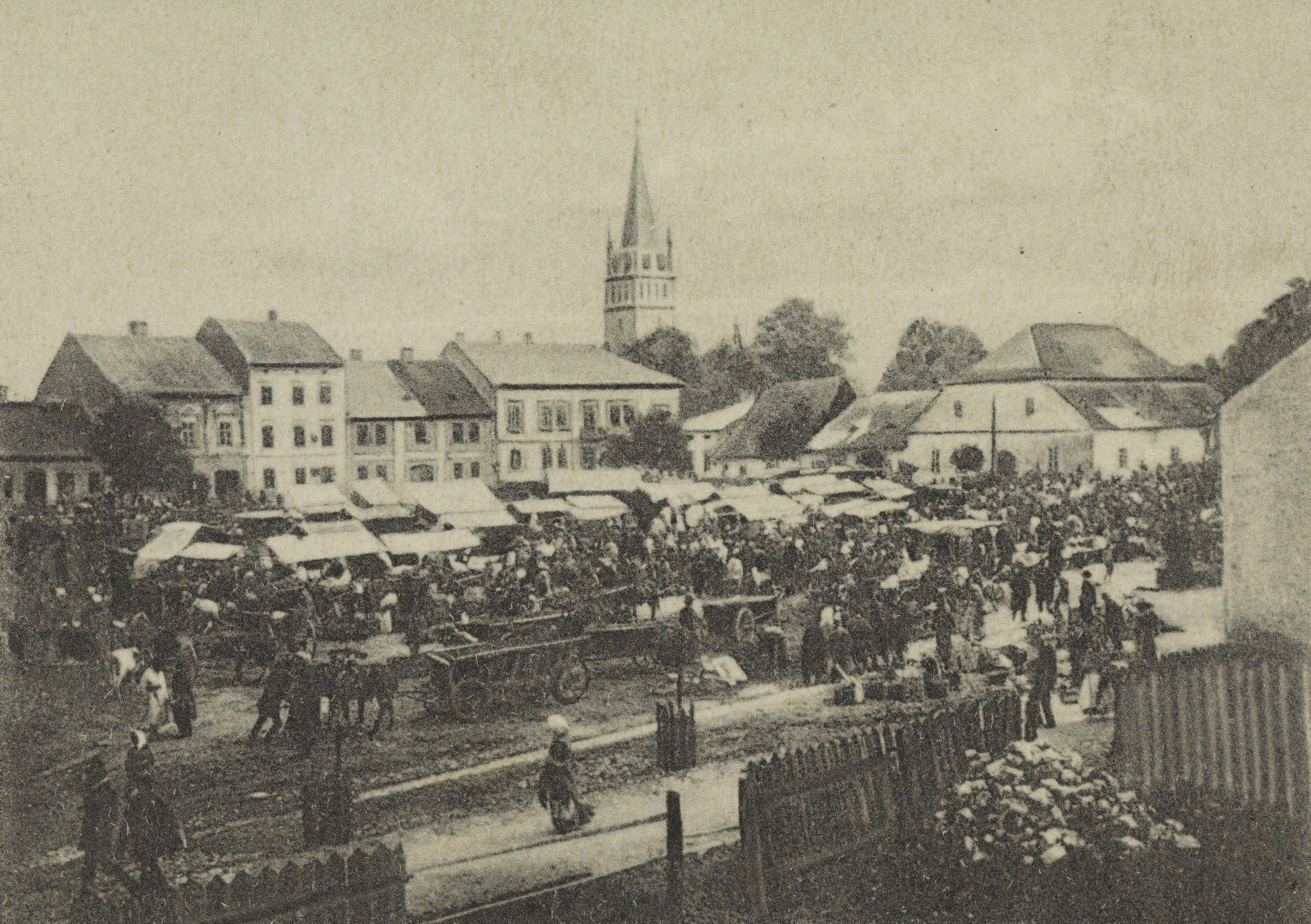
Skawina in the early 20th century

In the Second Polish Republic Skawina belonged to the Kraków Voivodeship. On September 6, 1939 the first Wehrmacht troops entered the town, and the German occupation lasted until January 23, 1945. During this time, the Germans murdered nearly all of the town's pre-war population of around 300 Jews. Some were murdered nearby while others were rounded up and sent to the Belzec extermination camp where they were immediately gassed. A few were sent to forced labor camps near Płaszów where most were later murdered too. Those who hid from the roundup were later shot in the town.

The Communist government of People's Republic of Poland decided that Skawina would become a center of heavy industry. In 1954, the Skawina Aluminum Works (Huta Aluminium Skawina) were opened, and in 1961 the Skawina Power Station (Elektrownia Skawina) went on line. The aluminium works were closed in 1981 due to the widespread pollution they caused. The growth of industry resulted in an influx of new residents and the construction of several apartment blocks in new districts of the town.

== Sports ==
Skawina is home to sports club Skawinka, founded in 1922.

== Twin Towns – Sister Cities ==
Skawina is twinned with:

- Thetford in the United Kingdom (since 2004)
- Civitanova Marche in Italy (since 2005)
- Hürth in Germany (since 1996)
- Roztoky in Czech Republic (since 2005)
- Turčianske Teplice in Slovakia (since 1999)
- Peremyshliany in Ukraine (since 2008)
- Holešov in Czech Republic (since 2017)
- Krzęcin upon Ina in Poland (since 2017)

== Notable people ==
- Andrzej Hałaciński (1891–1940), Polish military officer, poet and local official
