= Facimiech, Lesser Poland Voivodeship =

Facimiech
- Village
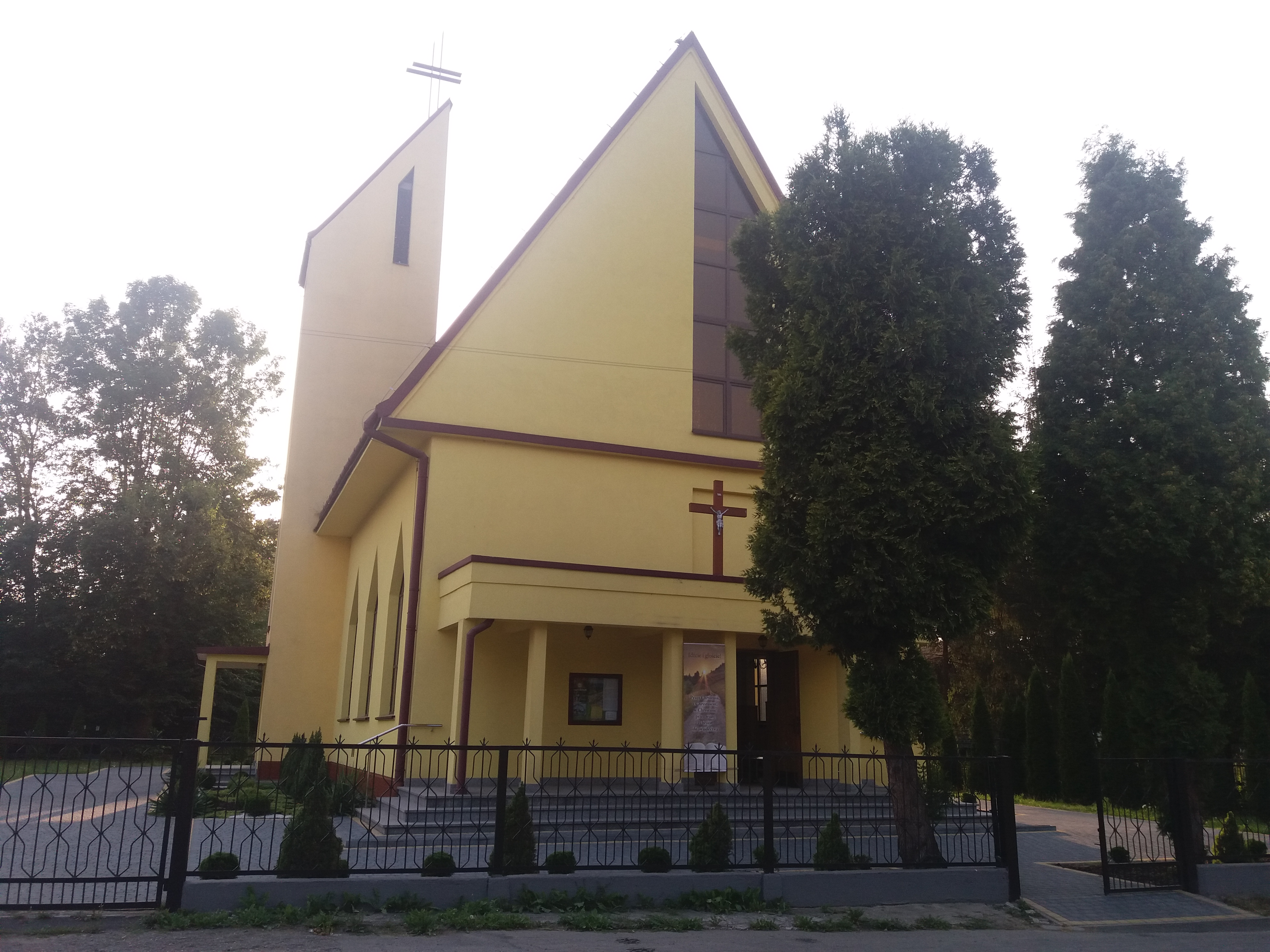
- Church of the Ascension in Facimiech

- Location within Poland
- Coordinates: 49°58′16″N 19°43′08″E
- Country: Poland
- Voivodeship: Lesser Poland
- County: Kraków
- Gmina: Skawina

Facimiech [faˈt͡ɕimjɛx] is a village in the administrative district of Gmina Skawina, within Kraków County, Lesser Poland Voivodeship, in southern Poland.
