= Wola Radziszowska =

- Village
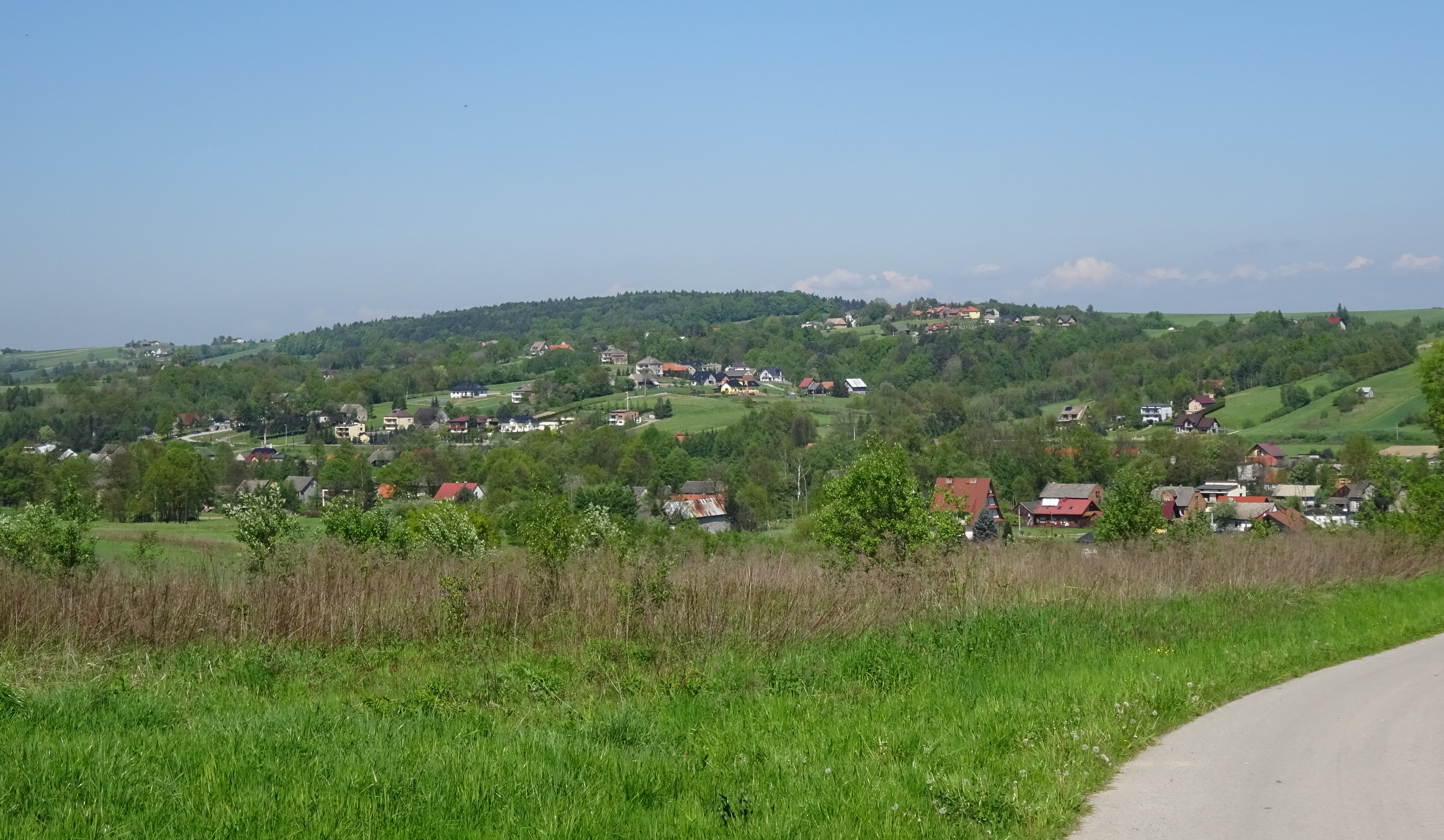

- Location within Poland
- Coordinates: 49°55′N 19°47′E
- Country: Poland
- Voivodeship: Lesser Poland
- County: Kraków
- Gmina: Skawina

Wola Radziszowska [ˈvɔla rad͡ʑiˈʂɔfska] is a village in the administrative district of Gmina Skawina, within Kraków County, Lesser Poland Voivodeship, in southern Poland.
