= Spytkowice, Wadowice County =

Spytkowice
- Village
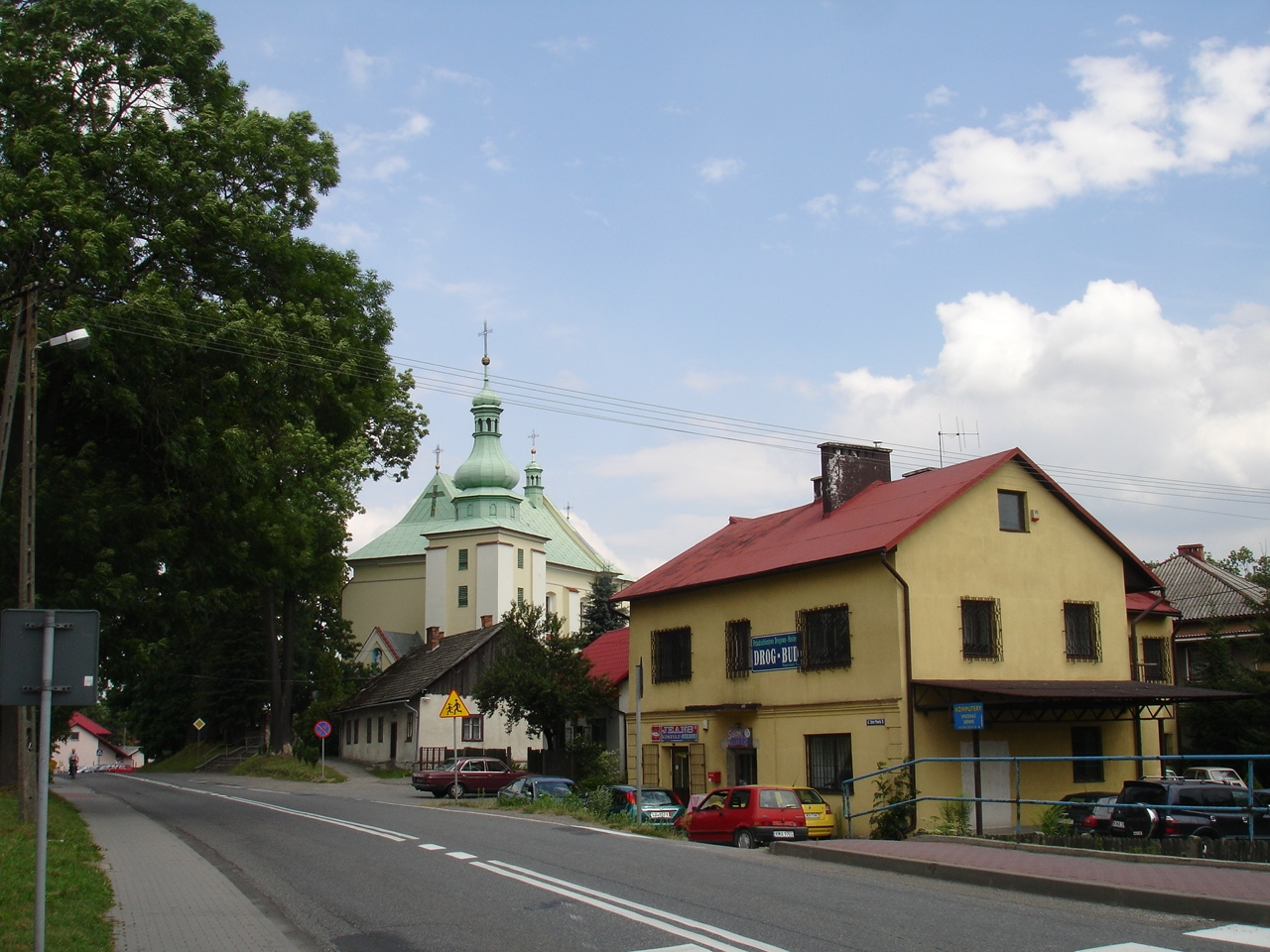
- Center of the village

- Location within Poland
- Coordinates: 49°59′36″N 19°30′10″E
- Country: Poland
- Voivodeship: Lesser Poland
- County: Wadowice
- Gmina: Spytkowice
- Population: 3,700

Spytkowice [spɨtkɔˈvit͡sɛ] is a village in Wadowice County, Lesser Poland Voivodeship, in southern Poland. It is the seat of the gmina (administrative district) called Gmina Spytkowice.
