= Pozowice =

- Village
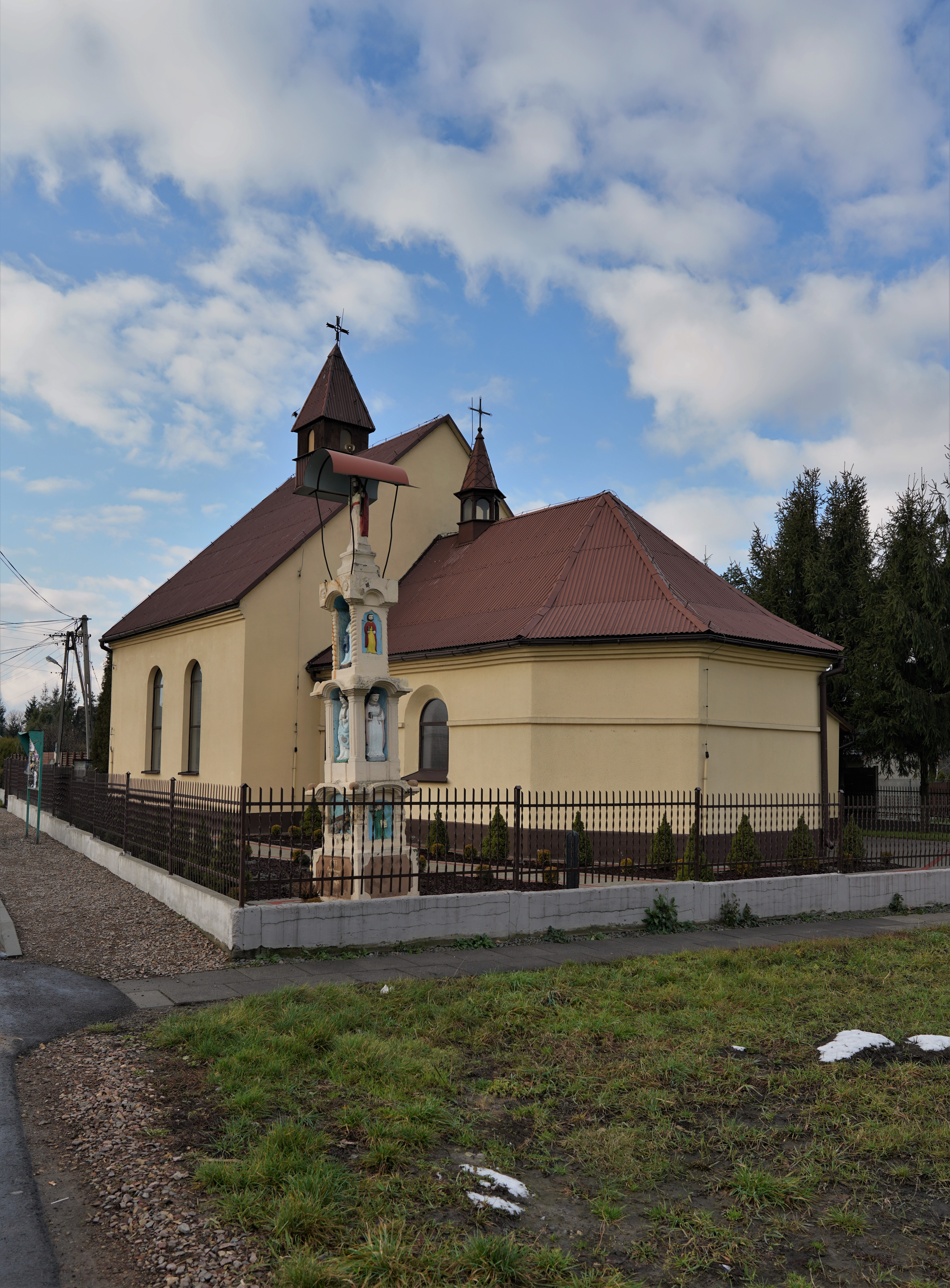
- Church in Pozowice

- Location within Poland
- Coordinates: 49°59′N 19°42′E
- Country: Poland
- Voivodeship: Lesser Poland
- County: Kraków
- Gmina: Skawina

Pozowice [pɔzɔˈvit͡sɛ] is a village in the administrative district of Gmina Skawina, within Kraków County, Lesser Poland Voivodeship, in southern Poland.
