= Jewish Community Centre of Kraków =

Coordinates: 50°03′11″N 19°56′42″E

Jewish Community Centre of Kraków (JCC Krakow)
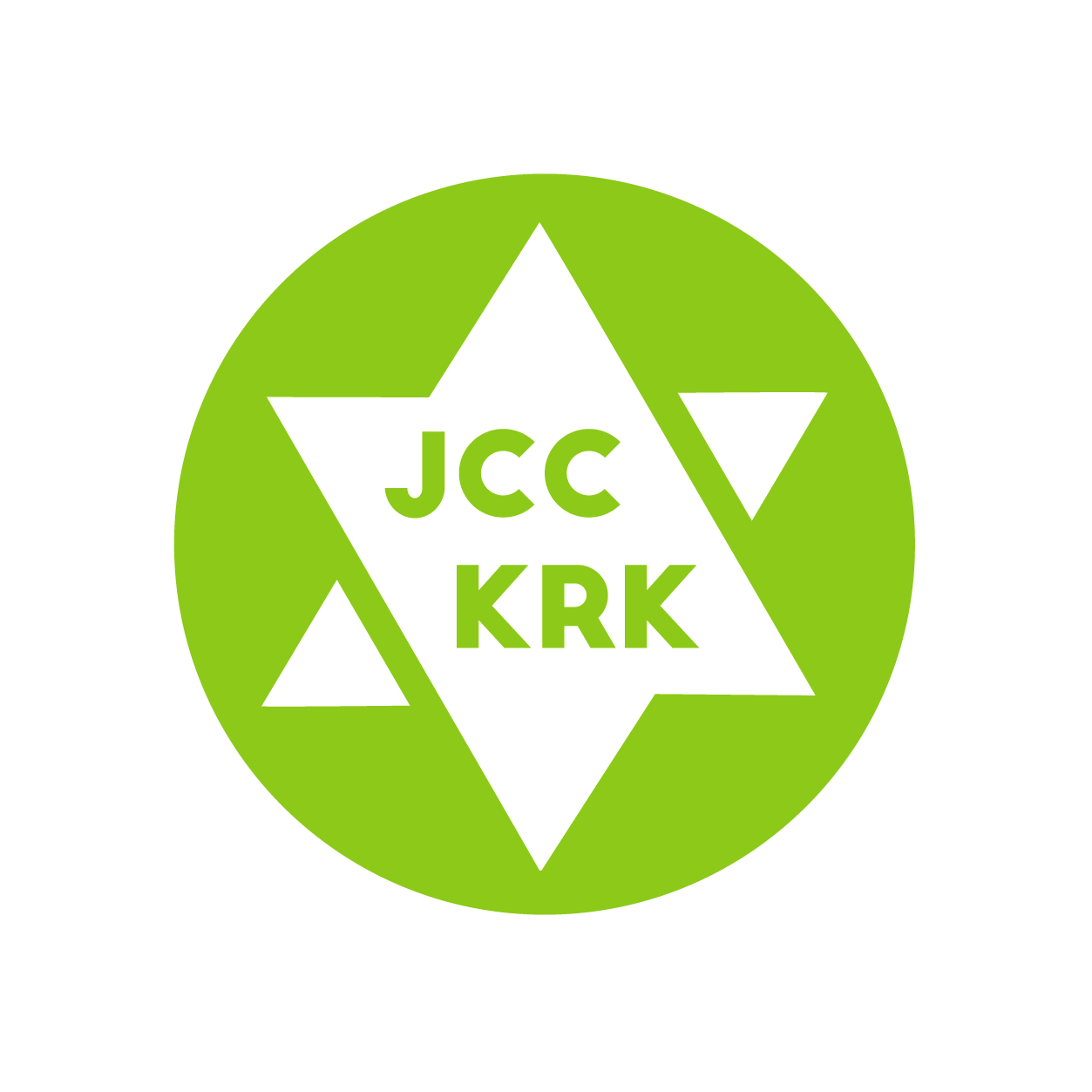

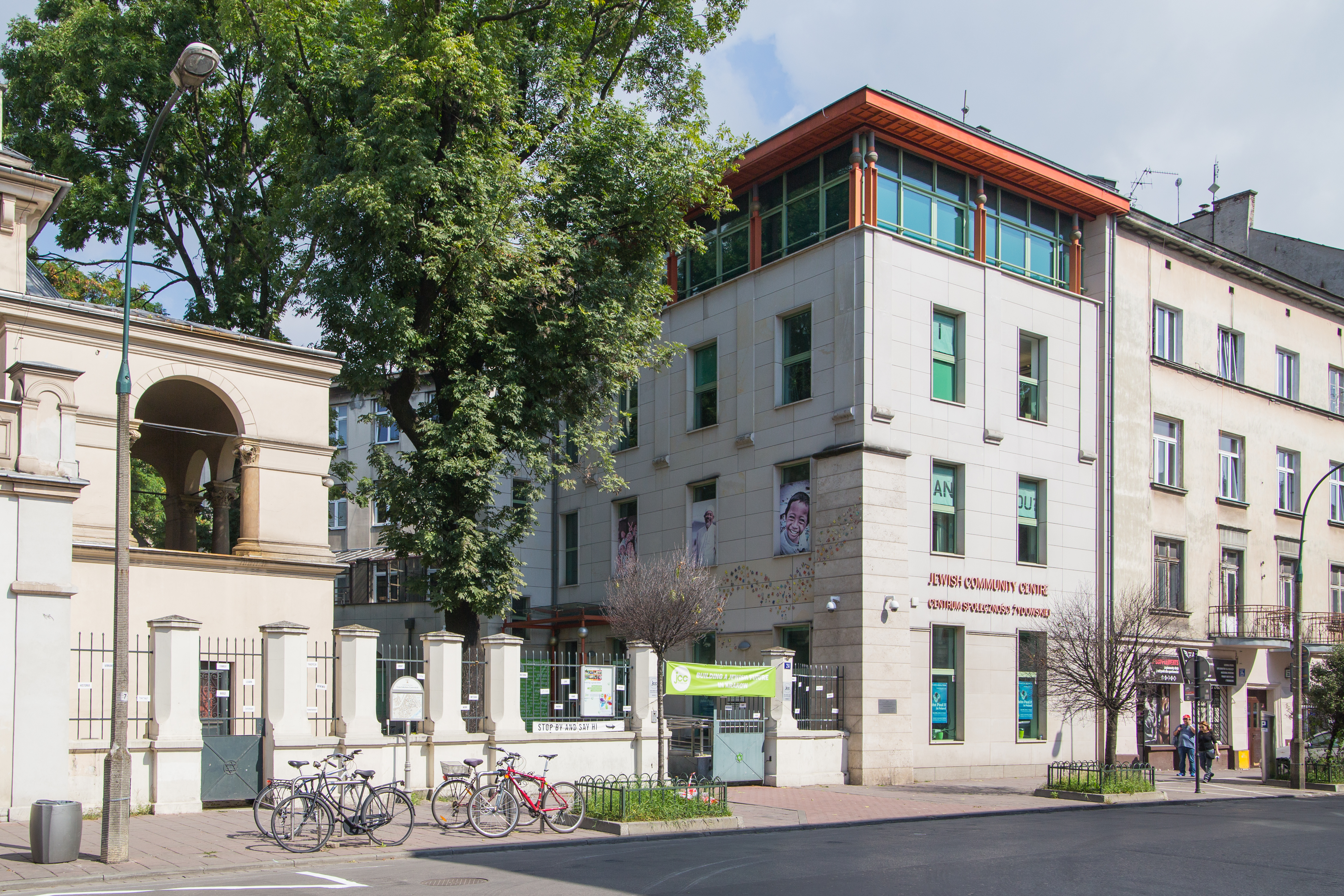
- Established: 29 April 2008
- Location: 24 Miodowa Street, 31-055 Kraków
- Director: Jonathan Ornstein
- Website: jcckrakow.org

Jewish Community Centre of Kraków (JCC Krakow, Polish: Centrum Społeczności Żydowskiej w Krakowie) (not to be confused with the official Jewish Community of Kraków, Polish: Gmina Wyznaniowa Żydowska w Krakowie, whose existence is traced back to the 14th. century and which owns the pre-war buildings) is a secular cultural and educational centre that opened in 2008 as the result of an initiative by the Prince of Wales. The site is leased from the official Jewish Community of Kraków. "JCC" is located in the Kazimierz district of Kraków on ul. Miodowa. It stands on the site of a garden to the rear of the Tempel Synagogue, abutting the adjacent building.

== History ==
In June 2002, the Prince of Wales visited Kraków, where he met with local Holocaust survivors. Moved by their stories, the prince asked the group how he could help. Initially, they conceived of a senior center or old age home where survivors could meet and socialize. After consulting further with Kraków’s Jewish community and with the British Jewish humanitarian organization World Jewish Relief, the prince came to understand that Poland is home not only to Holocaust survivors, but also to a young, reemerging Jewish community. The idea for a Jewish community center for all generations was born. With the financial support of World Jewish Relief and the American Jewish Joint Distribution Committee, construction of the 4-storey, 850 m² Centre was completed in 2008 at a cost of 10 million zloty. On 29 April 2008, the Prince of Wales and the Duchess of Cornwall came to Kraków to formally open the Jewish Community Centre of Kraków on Miodowa Street in Kraków's Jewish Quarter of Kazimierz.

== Activities ==
JCC Krakow provides social and educational services to the Jewish community of Kraków, coordinates programming open to the entire Kraków community to foster Polish-Jewish relations, and acts as Kraków's Jewish visitor center. The center also works to change the world’s perception of Poland and provides a forum for Poles, both Jewish and non-Jewish, to engage with one another.

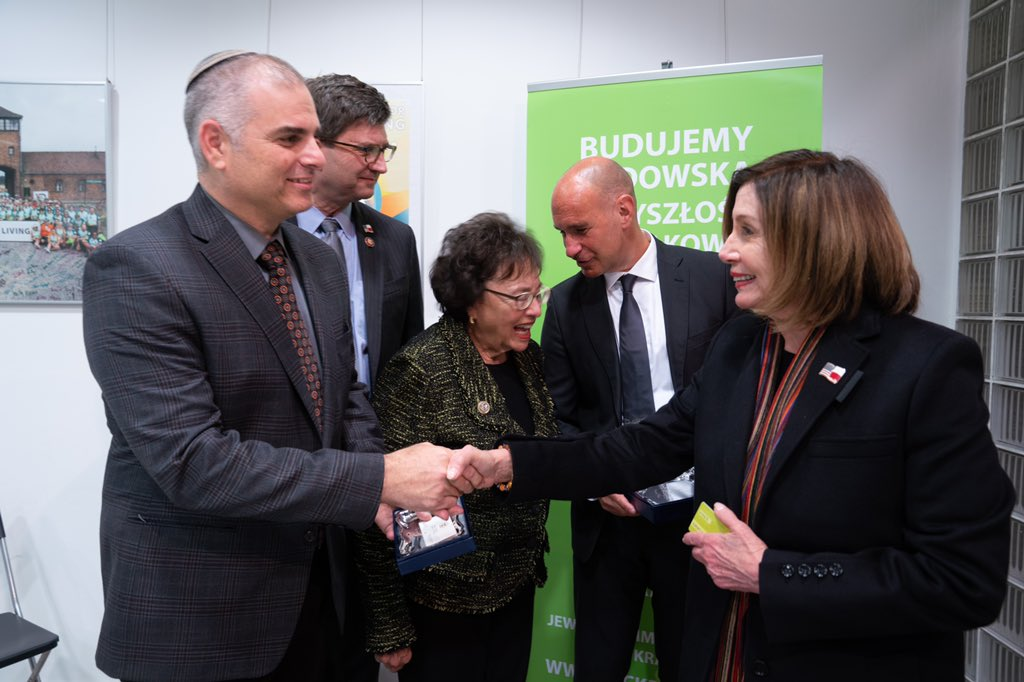
Jonathan Ornstein, Speaker Nancy Pelosi and Representative Nita Lowey in JCC Krakow during their 2020 visit to Poland

The JCC serves over 1,100 Jewish members. More than 20 children attend JCC Krakow's FRAJDA Early Childhood Center, which opened in September 2017 and whose name means "joy" in both Yiddish and Polish. FRAJDA is the first full-time, pluralistic Jewish preschool to open in Kraków in over half a century. The JCC also has a student club, under the auspices of Hillel International since 2017, now called Hillel GIMEL. Many of the JCC's young members discovered their Jewish roots only recently, having come from families that concealed their religious identities under communism.

JCC Krakow is the primary agency caring for nearly 60 Holocaust survivors in Kraków, providing transportation, rehabilitation, meals, and welfare services, as well as social and educational programming. At the same time, the JCC welcomes over 125 international visitors every year, who receive assistance from the center's visitor services department and often meet with JCC members and staff to learn about their lives.

A volunteer program of about 150 people, many who are not Jewish, helps the JCC with its programming. Volunteers welcome visitors at reception, serve Shabbat dinners, sit and talk with survivors in the Senior Club, and more.

The JCC runs many programs, some open to the public and some open only to members. On some Friday nights, the JCC hosts Shabbat dinner. Other sample programs include Senior University educational lectures; Hebrew, Arabic, and English classes; yoga classes; book talks; Torah lessons with a rabbi; intergenerational cooking and art workshops; film screenings; art openings; and holiday parties. The JCC also puts on special programming as part of the Jewish Culture Festival in Kraków each year.

== Ride For The Living ==
Ride For The Living (RFTL) is a four-day annual event, typically in late June, that began in 2014. Participants immerse themselves in Poland’s Jewish past, present, and future. The highlight of the weekend is a bike ride from Auschwitz-Birkenau to JCC Krakow. Ride For The Living was inspired by Robert Desmond, who rode his bicycle 1,350 miles from London to Auschwitz, visiting WWII sites of liberation along his journey. After joining the JCC and learning about Kraków's reborn Jewish community, he realized his ride should not have ended in a place of loss, but rather in the place of hope and Jewish community that is JCC Krakow.

Ride For The Living is JCC Krakow's largest annual fundraiser. Funds raised during the first Ride supported a week-long trip to Israel for child survivors of the Holocaust in March 2015. Money raised during subsequent Rides has funded several new initiatives for Kraków's Jewish seniors, including a 2015 calendar featuring survivors' photos and stories, English classes, increased medical and welfare services, and Senior University. Senior University is a continuing education program that aims to re-engage members in academic learning. Professors and scholars from Kraków’s Jagiellonian University come to the JCC to lecture on the history of Krakówian Jews and topics related to Jewish culture, customs, and tradition. The Ride also supports the JCC’s core programming for all members and community outreach in Kraków.

In addition to the ordinary Ride For The Living, JCC Krakow runs a Satellite Ride For The Living program that offers Jewish Community Centers, Hillels, and Jewish Federations in North America the opportunity to host bike rides or cycling classes in their own communities focused on learning about and supporting Kraków's Jewish revival.
