= Kopanka, Lesser Poland Voivodeship =

Village in Lesser Poland Voivodeship, Poland

Kopanka
- Village
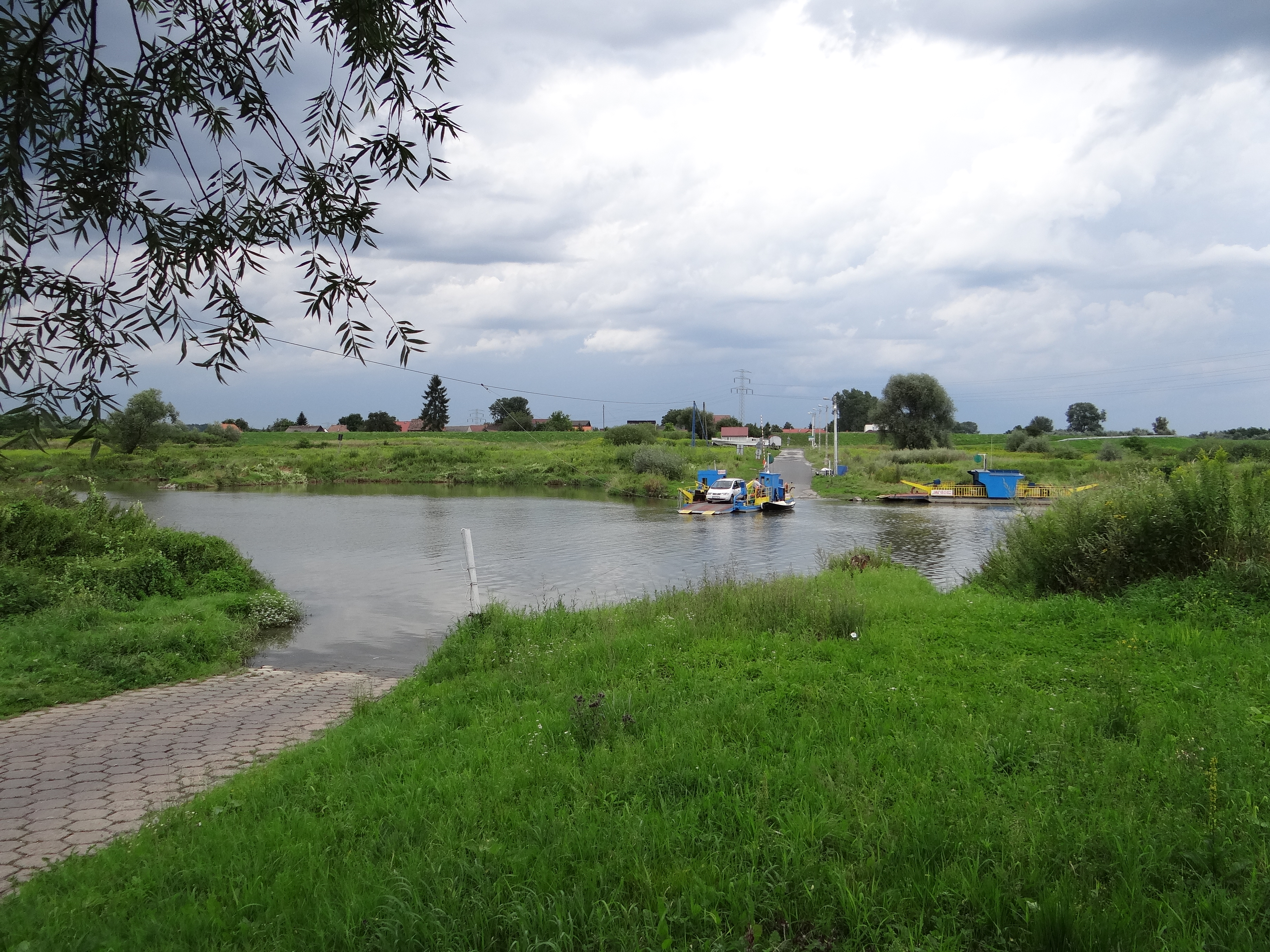

- Location within Poland
- Coordinates: 49°59′00″N 19°47′31″E
- Country: Poland
- Voivodeship: Lesser Poland
- County: Kraków
- Gmina: Skawina

Kopanka [kɔˈpanka] is a village in the administrative district of Gmina Skawina, within Kraków County, Lesser Poland Voivodeship, in southern Poland.
