= Karol Levittoux =

Polish independence activist (1820 - 1841)

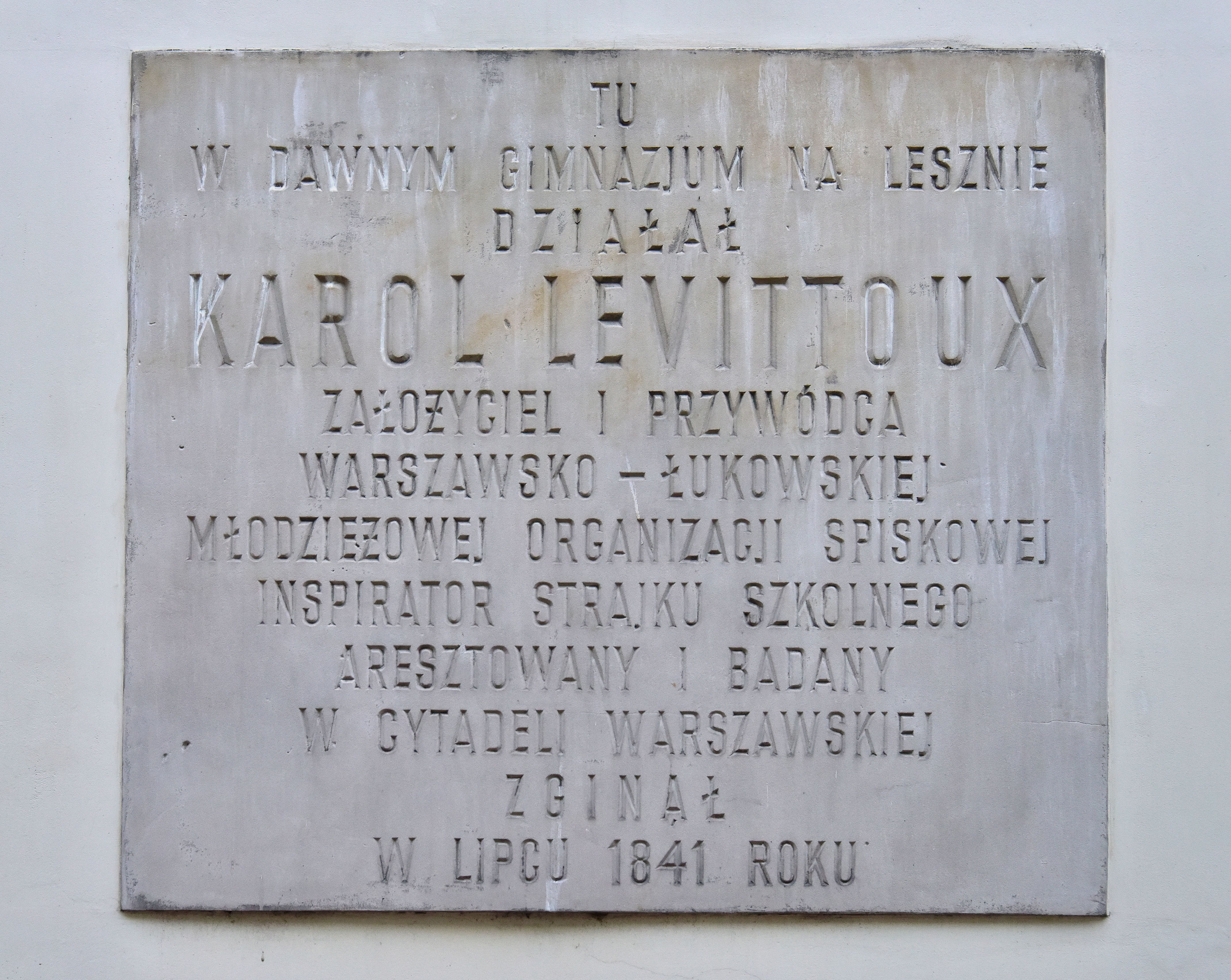
- A plaque commemorating Karol Levittoux in Warsaw
- Born: 1820; Kumelsk
- Died: July 7, 1841; Warsaw, Russian Empire
- Cause of death: Suicide by self-immolation
- Occupation: Student

Karol Levittoux (1820 – 7 July 1841) was a Polish independence activist and a law student in Warsaw. Karol was the son of Piotr Levittoux-Desnouettes, a French sergeant who settled in Poland in 1813.

== Biography ==
Karol was born in 1820, likely in Kumelsk near Kolno. A student and graduate of the Piarist high school in Łuków, and a student of pedagogical courses in Warsaw. In 1839, he founded the Patriotic Union in Łuków, whose activities focused on self-education and agitation, as part of the Association of the Polish People. He also initiated a similar union in Chełm. Those involved in the conspiracies were accused of aiming to incite an armed uprising, establish a republican government, and abolish serfdom while granting land to peasants. The conspiracy was uncovered due to testimony given by an elementary school teacher in Łuków, Jan Thierbach. After being arrested in 1841, Levittoux spent several months in the Warsaw Citadel. A brutal investigation, following a failed escape attempt, led him to commit suicide as he refused to betray his comrades. Levittoux set his mattress on fire and died in the flames.

Bolesław Limanowski describes the course of events as follows:

An army of spies, under the command of the infamous Abramowicz, raided houses and estates, and upon finding a forbidden book or some other incriminating evidence, they imprisoned people and sent them to the Citadel. (...) This was the case in 1841, when the school youth association in Łuków was uncovered. Around 200 young men were brought in at that time. The youth stood firm, and nothing could be extracted from them. The leader of this association was Karol Levittoux, a young man of great fortitude and extraordinary ability. He received 2,000 lashes, 400 every two days, was starved, and deprived of sleep, but he endured it all and betrayed no one. Due to the marriage of Nicholas's successor, efforts were made to release the Łuków youth, but Levittoux was excluded from this clemency. Efforts were then made to help him escape, and a saw for cutting the bars was sent hidden in the spine of a book, along with a letter and a cipher. However, during a routine prisoner inspection, it was discovered by the gendarmes. New interrogations and new tortures followed. Levittoux, weakened in body and feeling his spirit falter, out of fear that he might betray someone, set fire to his bed and ended his life on it. This was in the last days of July 1841. From that time, they stopped providing light to the prisoners.

Cyprian Kamil Norwid, in a letter to Zygmunt Krasiński, described Levittoux's death as follows:

...he knelt on a bed of hard planks wrapped in straw ropes – under those planks, he placed a candle. Slowly, the twisted straw ropes caught fire. It must have felt like an eternity as they smoldered before starting to deal death. Hours passed before the bed turned into a pile of coals rather than flames. He was found kneeling, his chest and face charred, half-collapsed and lifeless...

== In Art ==
Karol Levittoux's deed inspired Cyprian Kamil Norwid to write the poem Burza (Śmiało, młodzieńcze...).

Norwid also refers to Levittoux's death in a passage from his 1866 drama Za kulisami. These words inspired Jerzy Andrzejewski to title his novel Ashes and Diamonds, and the piece was performed as a song titled "For That Very Reason," sung by Stan Borys, among others.

Other poets also dedicated verses to him, including Władysław Syrokomla (Karol Levittoux), Mieczysław Romanowski (Śmierć Levittoux), Roman Zmorski (Modlitwa), and Jan Kanty Radecki (Spaleniec).

He was also the subject of a contemporary poem by Jerzy Czech titled Karol Levittoux, performed by Przemysław Gintrowski to his own music composition (the song was part of the 1991 program "Kamienie”).

The painter Antoni Kozakiewicz (1841-1921) painted the work Śmierć Karola Levittoux (now lost, known only from reproductions).

Around 1862, Władysław Oleszczyński made a commemorative medal with the images of Father Florian Topolski and Karol Levittoux.

== Commemoration ==
- A street inside the Warsaw Citadel is named after Karol Levittoux
- A commemorative plaque on the gable wall of the Działyński Palace at 74a "Solidarności" Avenue in Warsaw was unveiled in 1966.
- In Łuków, the annual Karol Levittoux Volleyball Memorial is held, with the best amateur teams from all over Poland participating. On May 10, 2014, during the first day of the 2014 edition of the memorial, a commemorative plaque along with a stone was unveiled in the city park.

== Family ==
Karol's younger brother was Dr. Henryk Levittoux, a Warsaw doctor and naturalist, who posed for Jan Matejko's painting Astronomer Copernicus, or Conversations with God. Matejko also painted a portrait of Maria Levittoux, Karol's niece.

During the May Coup in 1926, one of the victims was a student and member of Chrobatia fraternity – Karol Levittoux, the activist's grandnephew, most likely killed by forces loyal to Józef Piłsudski.

Karol's great-grandnephew, Major Henryk Julian Levittoux, a doctor and participant in the September Campaign, was murdered in Katyn massacre in May 1940 as a prisoner of Kharkiv camp. His brother, Colonel Jerzy Levittoux, was a chief of staff in General Maczek's division and was killed in 1944 in Normandy.

== Bibliography ==
- Polski Słownik Biograficzny, Tom XVII, s. 196 i n.
- „Demokrata Polski” 1844, nr. 19, s. 91
- Maciej Załuski, Trzy wieki rodziny Levittoux w Polsce, wyd. Exemplum 2020
