= Aleksander Kotsis =

Polish painter (1836–1877)

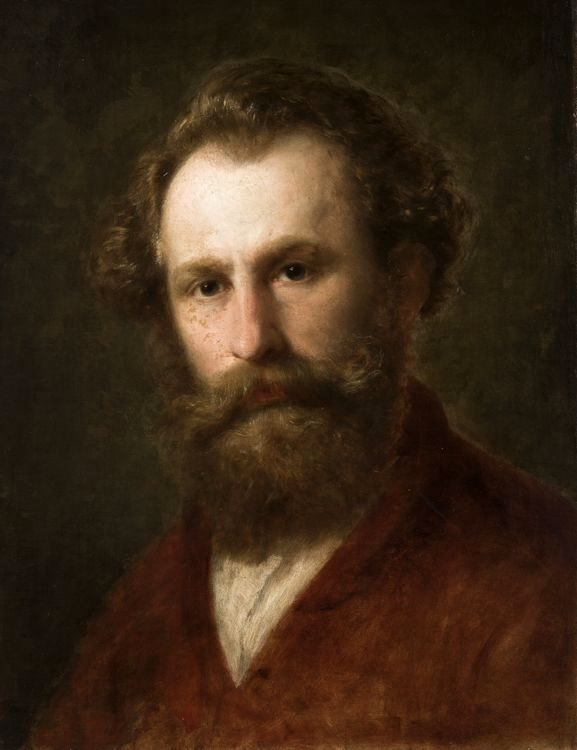
Self-portrait (date unknown)

Aleksander Kotsis (30 May 1836 – 7 August 1877) was a Polish painter. He created landscapes, portraits, and genre scenes in a combination Romantic and Realistic style. Most of his paintings are small. He was born and died in Kraków.

== Biography ==
He grew up just outside Kraków, where his family had a small farm. They moved into Kraków in 1846 to become merchants and he began his studies in 1850 at the Academy of Fine Arts with Wojciech Stattler and Władysław Łuszczkiewicz. His father was not supportive of his studies, so he had to continue working in their shop and taking his lessons intermittently.

In 1857, he began exhibiting with the Society of Friends of Fine Arts. Finally he sold some paintings and, with the assistance of Stattler, obtained a scholarship from the Ministry of Religion and Education which enabled him to enroll at the Academy of Fine Arts, Vienna, where he studied with Ferdinand Georg Waldmüller, among others.

He returned to Kraków in 1862 and became involved with a patriotic group that met in the studio of the sculptor, Parys Filippi, which was located in the Church of St. Francis of Assisi. Although this group became involved in the January Uprising, Kotsis spent most of the years 1862 to 1864 painting church murals.

After receiving another scholarship in 1866, he moved to Warsaw, then to Paris in 1867, followed by Brussels. When he returned home, he established a studio and worked constantly, spending his summers painting en plein aire in the Tatra Mountains. He also began exhibiting extensively throughout Poland and Northern Europe. After 1870, he travelled frequently and, from 1871 to 1875, lived primarily in Munich, where he often exhibited with the Kunstverein München. He shared a studio with his friends, Antoni Kozakiewicz and Franz Streitt, and went on painting excursions to the Bavarian Alps with them.

In 1875, he received an offer of a professorial chair at his alma mater but, that same year, was diagnosed with an incurable brain disorder. He was forced to refuse the chair and was unable to continue working. He died two years later.

== Selected paintings ==
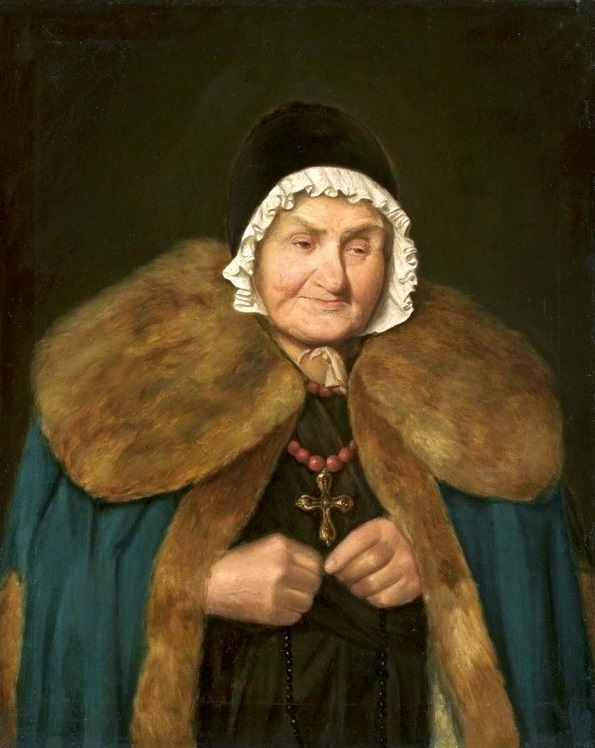
Old Woman with a Rosary

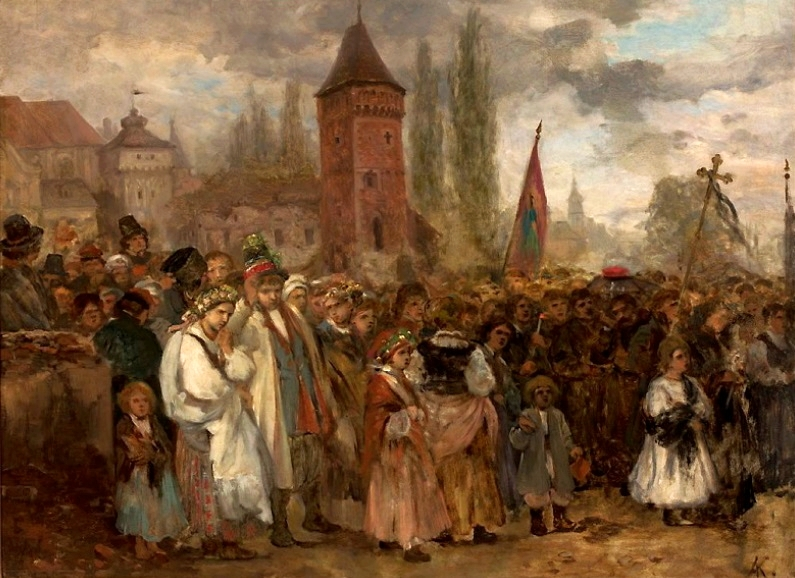
A Funeral and a Wedding

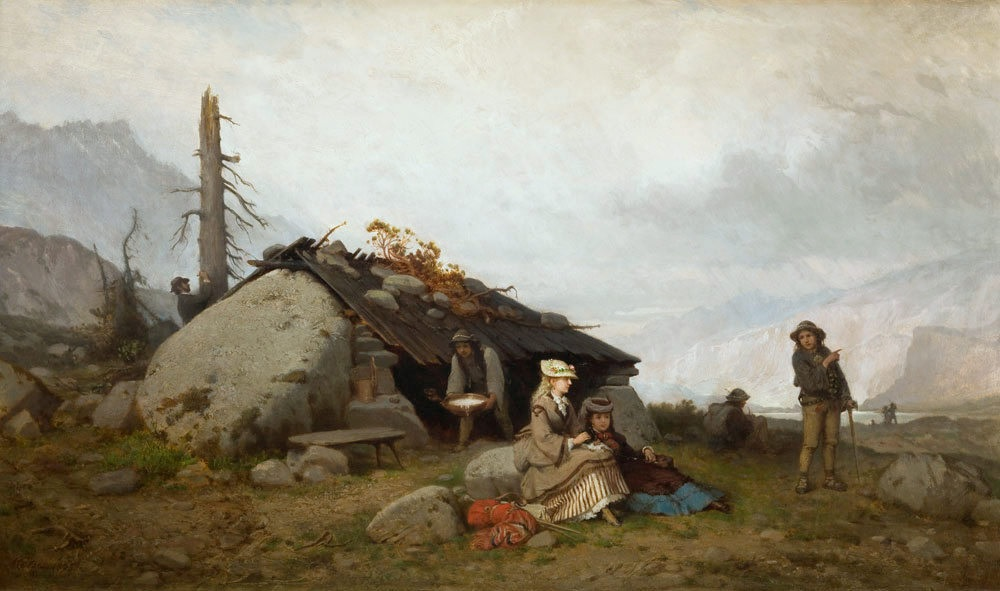
A Visit to the Tatras

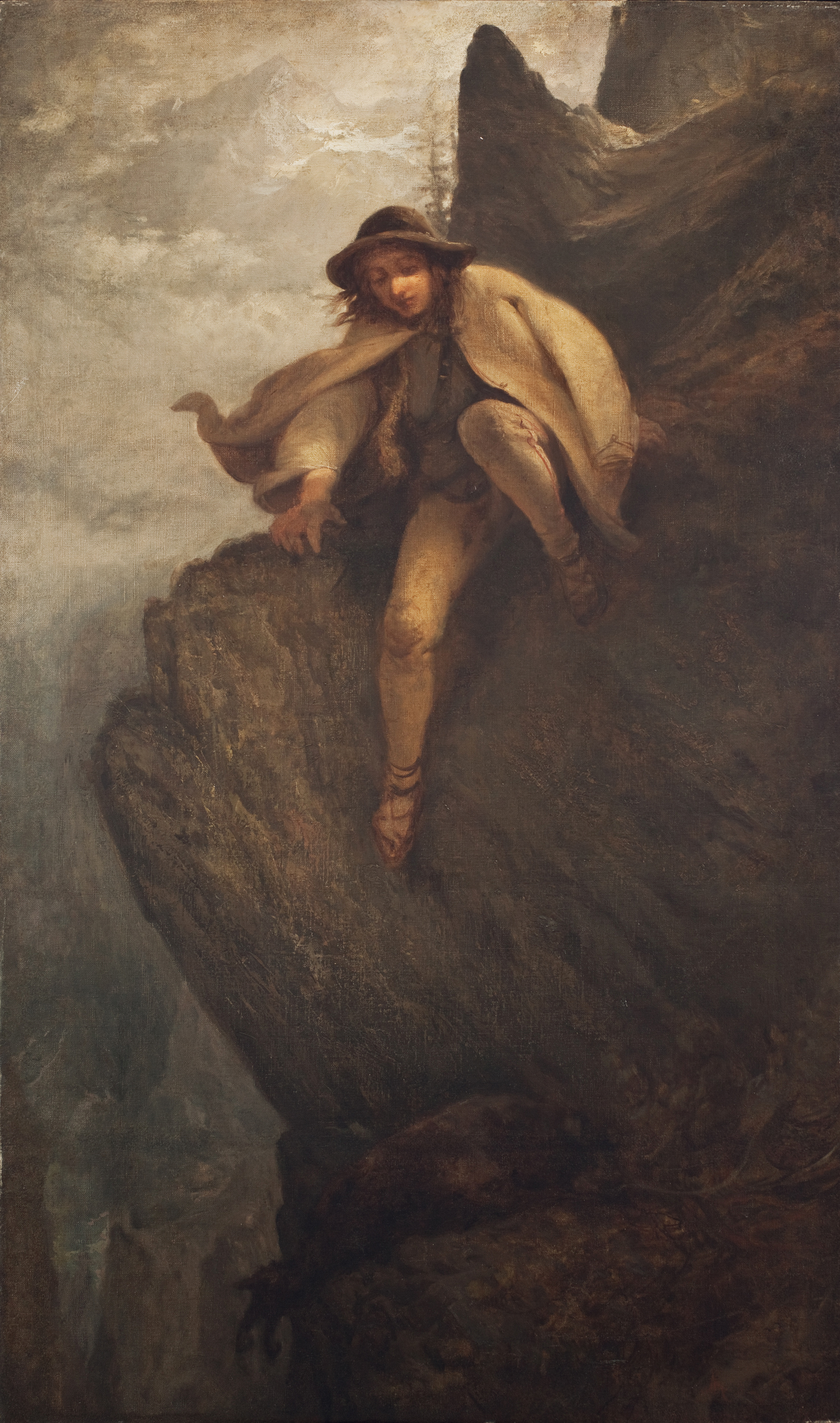
Poacher in the Tatras
