= Antoni Kozakiewicz =

Polish painter (1841–1929)

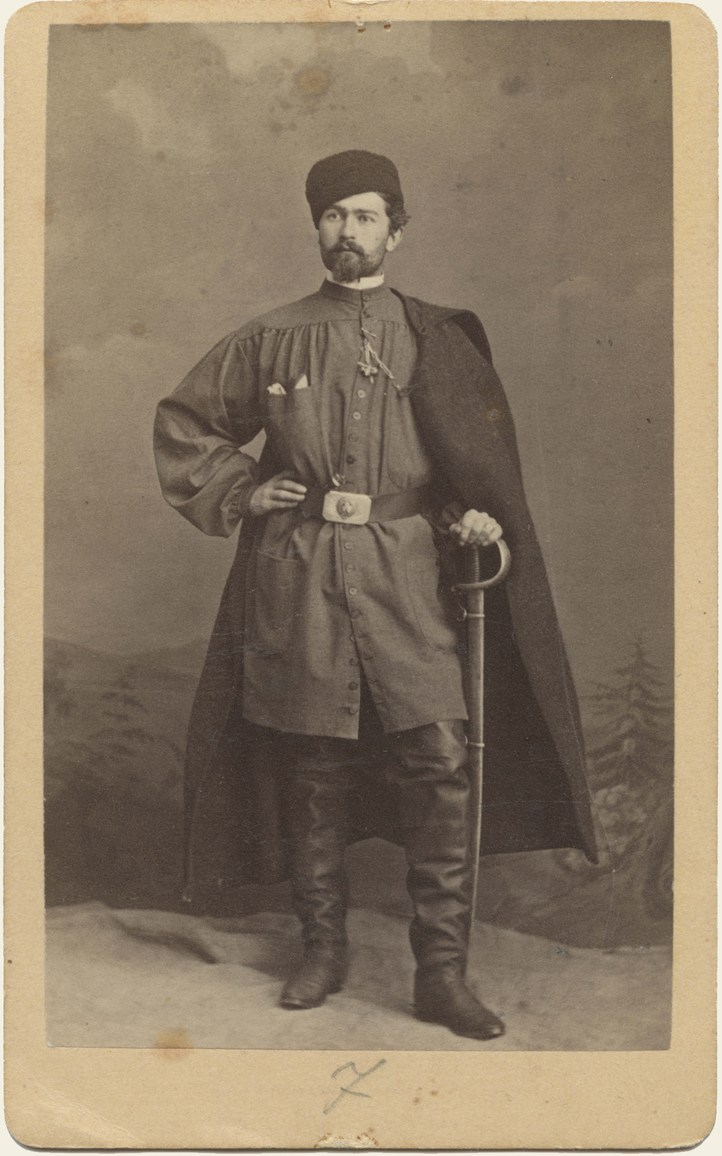
Antoni Kozakiewicz in uniform during the January Uprising (1863)

Antoni Kozakiewicz (13 June 1841 — 3 January 1929) was a Polish genre painter in the Realist style.

== Biography ==
He was born in Kraków and began his studies in 1857 at the Kraków Academy of Fine Arts under Władysław Łuszczkiewicz, among others, graduating in 1866.

It took him some extra time to complete his courses because, in 1863, he was a participant in the January Uprising, during which he was captured by Russian troops and imprisoned until the insurgency was over. After graduation, he continued his studies at the Academy of Fine Arts, Vienna.

In 1871, thanks to an Imperial Scholarship, he was able to continue his education at the Academy of Fine Arts Munich. He shared a studio with Franz Streitt and Aleksander Kotsis and often went on painting expeditions with them in the mountains of Bavaria. His work met with great success there, so he decided to stay; remaining for almost thirty years altogether, although he made regular visits to Poland.

From 1900 to 1905, he lived in Warsaw, but failed to achieve the same success there. He was eventually forgotten and retired to the resort village of Szczawnica. Some sources give his year of death as 1912, which may be the year he stopped painting and/or exhibiting. He returned to Kraków shortly before he died.

Many of his early works were scenes from the January Uprising. He depicted the death of Polish activist Karol Levittoux, who set himself on fire in Warsaw Citadel to avoid betraying his comrades, in his painting Śmierć Karola Levittoux (the original painting is lost, known only from reproduction). In Munich, he painted a series of works depicting the lives of Polish peasants, Jews and Gypsies. He also created illustrations for children's stories and Pan Tadeusz by Adam Mickiewicz, as well as portraits and landscapes. His older brother, Piotr Kozakiewicz (1836–1893), was a well-known sculptor.

== Selected paintings ==
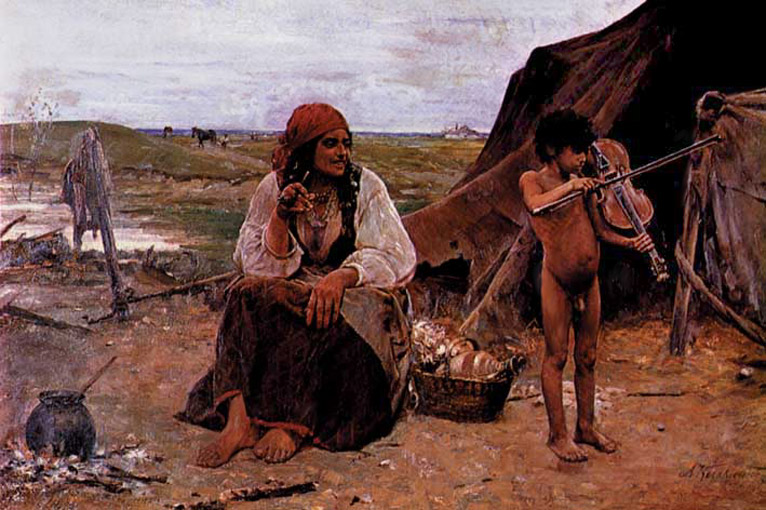
The Little Virtuoso

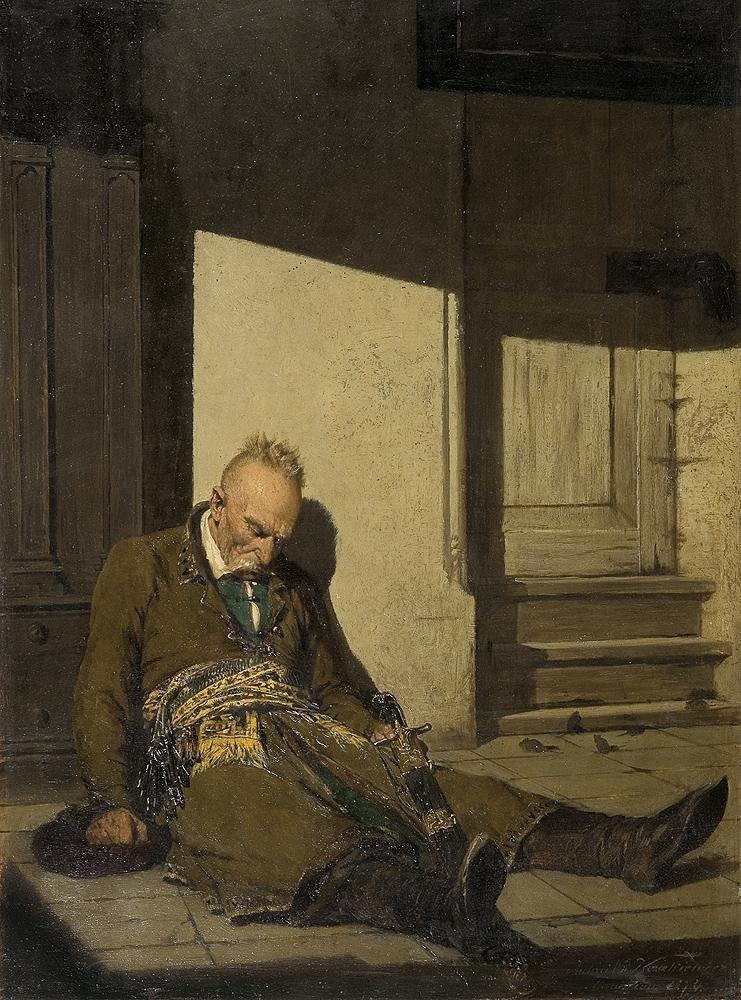
Gerwazy Asleep, from Pan Tadeusz

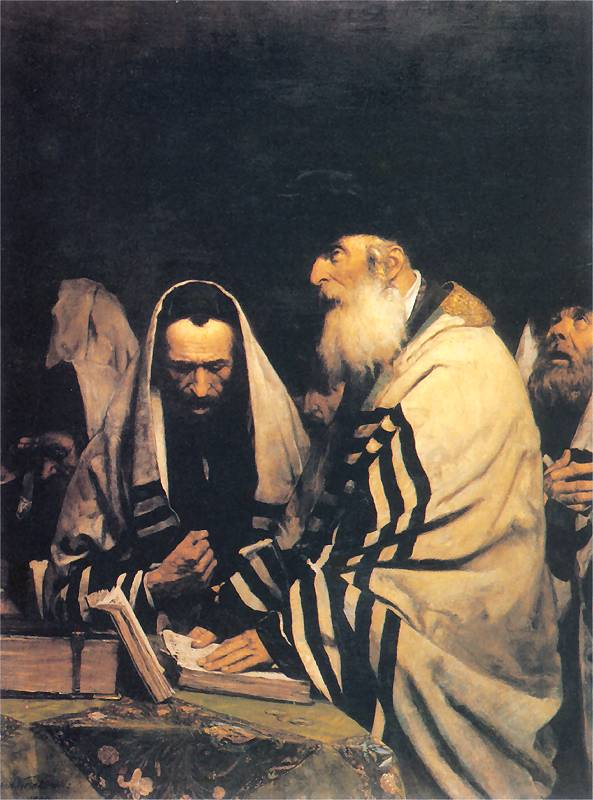
Jews Praying

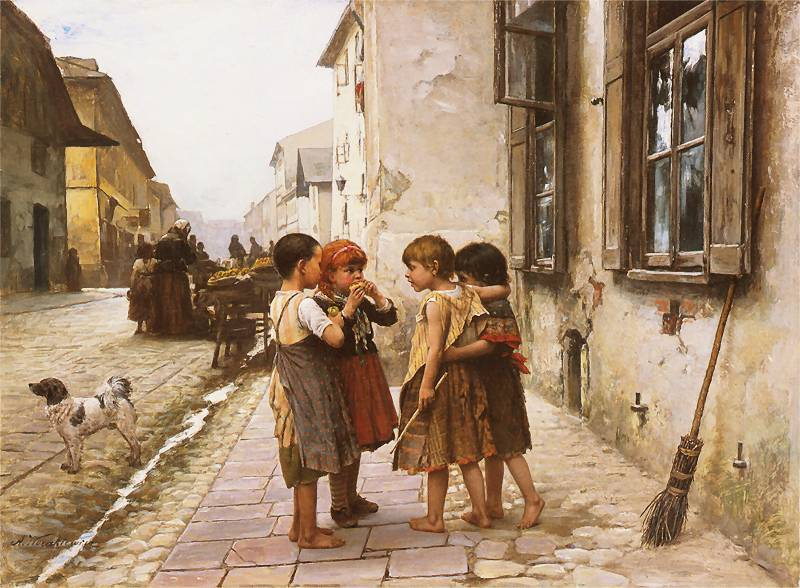
In the Street
