= Paszkówka Palace =

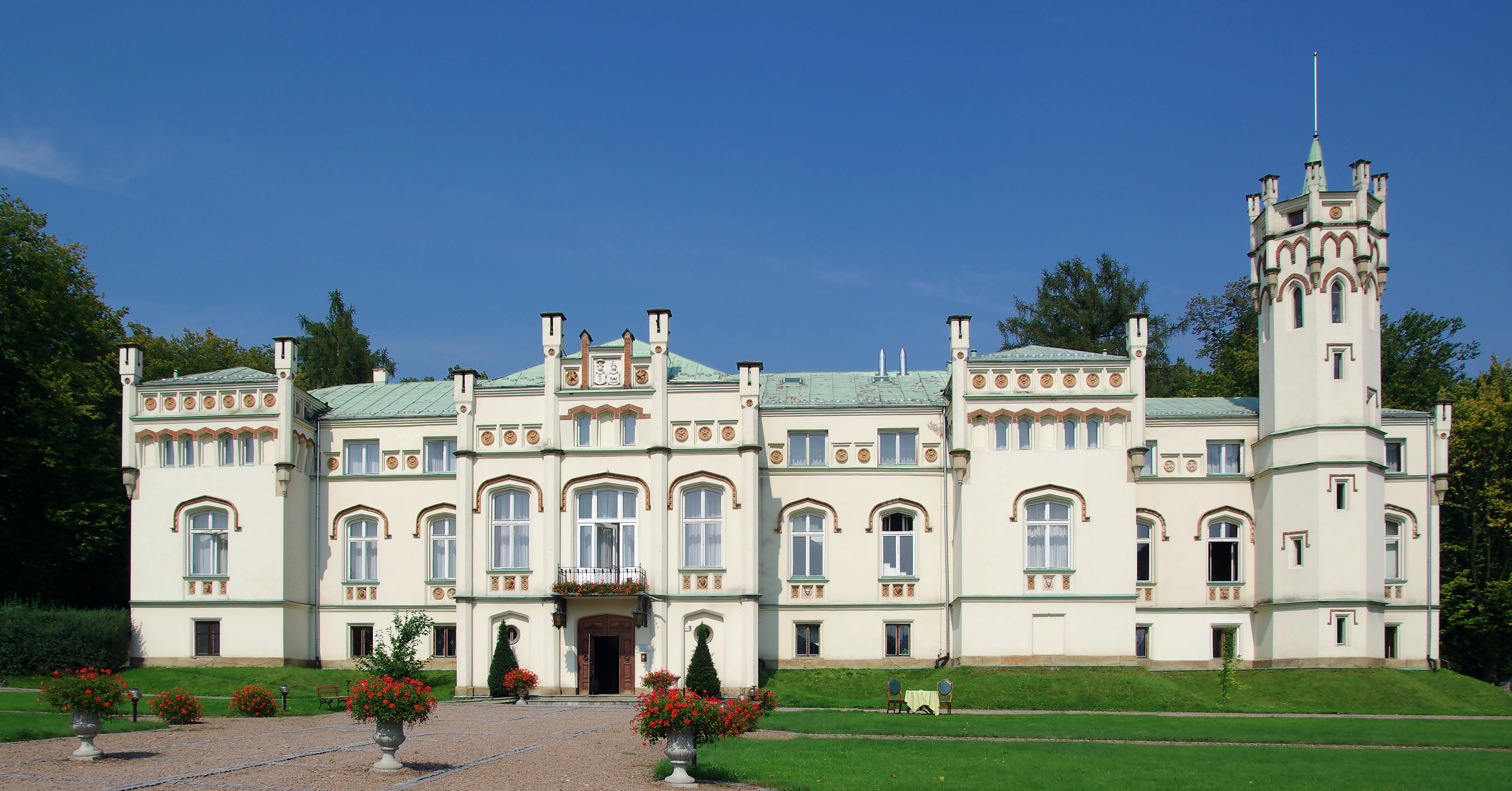
- Paszkówka Palace

- Location of Paszkówka Palace in Poland
- 49°56′26.142″N 19°41′7.7712″E
- Location: Paszkówka, Lesser Poland Voivodeship; in Poland

History
- Built: 1865

Site notes
- Architect: Piotr Bosio
- Architectural style: Gothic Revival

Paszkówka Palace (Polish: Pałac w Paszkówce) is a 19th-century Gothic Revival Wężyków family palace located in the village of Paszkówka, in Lesser Poland Voivodeship, to the south-west of Kraków. Today, the palace houses a luxury hotel.

== Architecture ==
Paszkówka Palace was designed by renowned, 19th-century Kraków architect Feliks Księżarski, inter alia the designer of Collegium Novum, the main edifice of the Jagiellonian University. The former building was only one storey high, with a battlement-finish staircase, which on the outside forms a tower.

The palace's architecture is drawn towards the Neo-Gothic architectural style, with elements of English Neo-Gothic. According to architectural critics, the palace fails to live up to all the forms of Neo-Gothic architecture and as such is branded "pseudo-" Gothic. The main distinct architectural properties of the building are that of a Mauretanian tower, avant-corps and pinnacles. Underneath the windows on the first storey are found mythological motifs.

The 19th-century palace is located in a characteristic English landscape garden type. There, old lime, oak and hornbeam trees grow. Part of the palace-garden complex is Hotel "Spichlerz", which was raised on the authentic foundation of the former granary.
