= Franz Streitt =

Polish-born German painter

- Born: November 24, 1839; Brody
- Died: December 29, 1890 (aged 51); Munich

Franz Streitt, or Franciszek Streitt (24 November 1839 – 29 December 1890) was a German painter. He was born in the Austrian Empire

== Family ==
His father was a tax collector.

== Education ==
He graduated from the Realschule in Lviv, followed by studies at the Technical University. From 1856 to 1866, he studied at the Academy of Fine Arts in Kraków with Władysław Łuszczkiewicz and Jan Matejko. He completed his studies at the Academy of Fine Arts Vienna, with Eduard von Engerth, graduating in 1871.

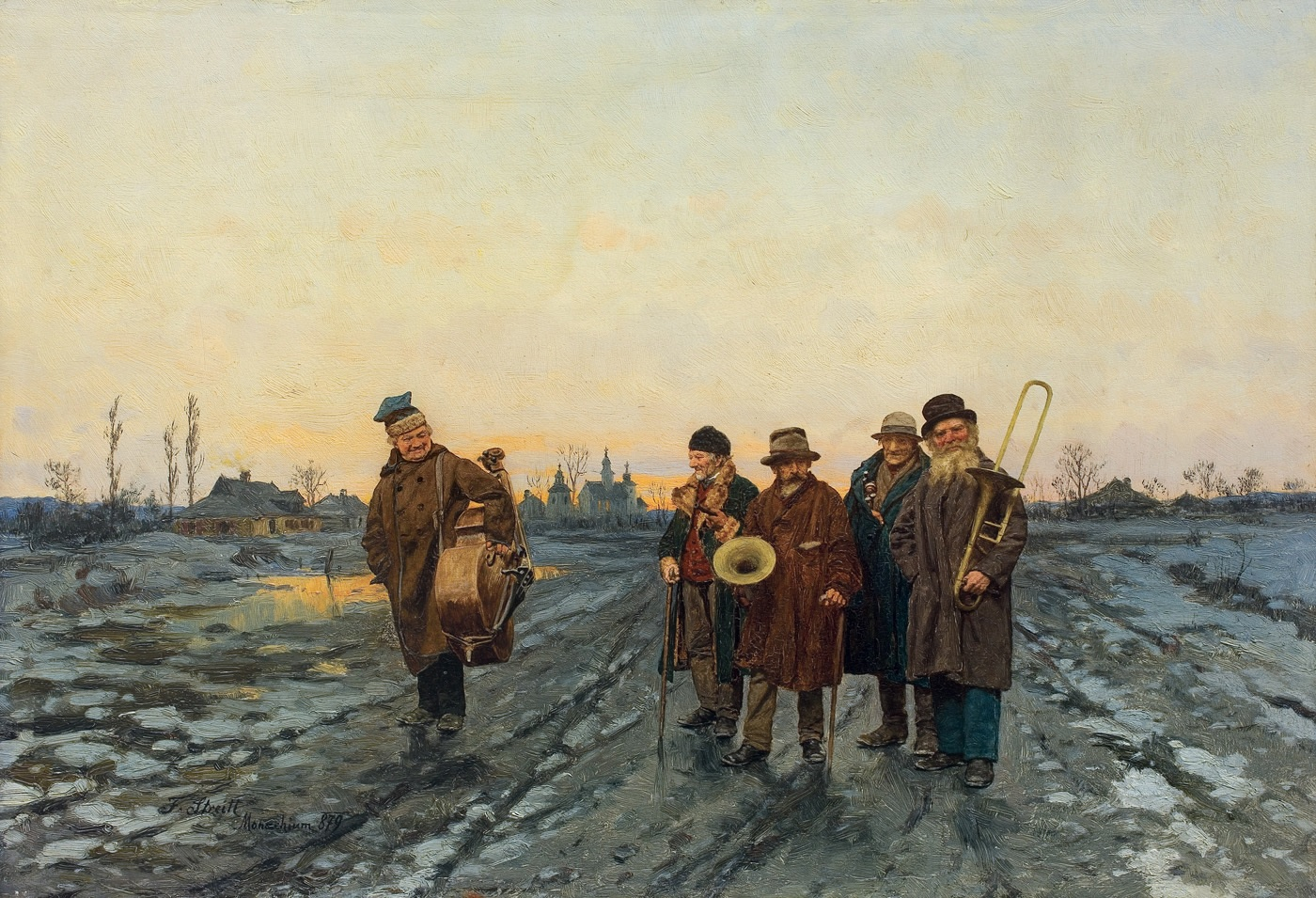
Traveling Musicians

== Later life ==
He initially settled in Cracow and painted historical scenes, inspired by his mentor, Matejko.

He was only there briefly, however, before moving to Munich, where he and Antoni Kozakiewicz opened a joint studio. Together, they formed a group of expatriate Polish artists that included Józef Brandt and Alfred Kowalski. He also became a member of the Kunstverein München. Later, he took several study trips to Galicia and Hungary.

Over time, he switched from historical painting to genre scenes, from the lives of farmers and Romani people. His works may be seen in collections in Germany, Austria, England and the United States. Some of his works appeared as illustrations in Die Gartenlaube of Leipzig.

In 1881, he married the painter, Maria Theresia Friedl (1855-1908).

== Sources ==
- Biography from the Biographisches Lexikon des Kaiserthums Oesterreich @ WikiSource
- T. Szybisty: "Streitt Franciszek (Franz)". In: Österreichisches Biographisches Lexikon 1815–1950 (ÖBL). Vol. 13, Austrian Academy of Sciences, Vienna 2010, ISBN 978-3-7001-6963-5, p. 395 f. (Direct links to "p. 395", "p. 396")
