= Paszkówka =

- Village
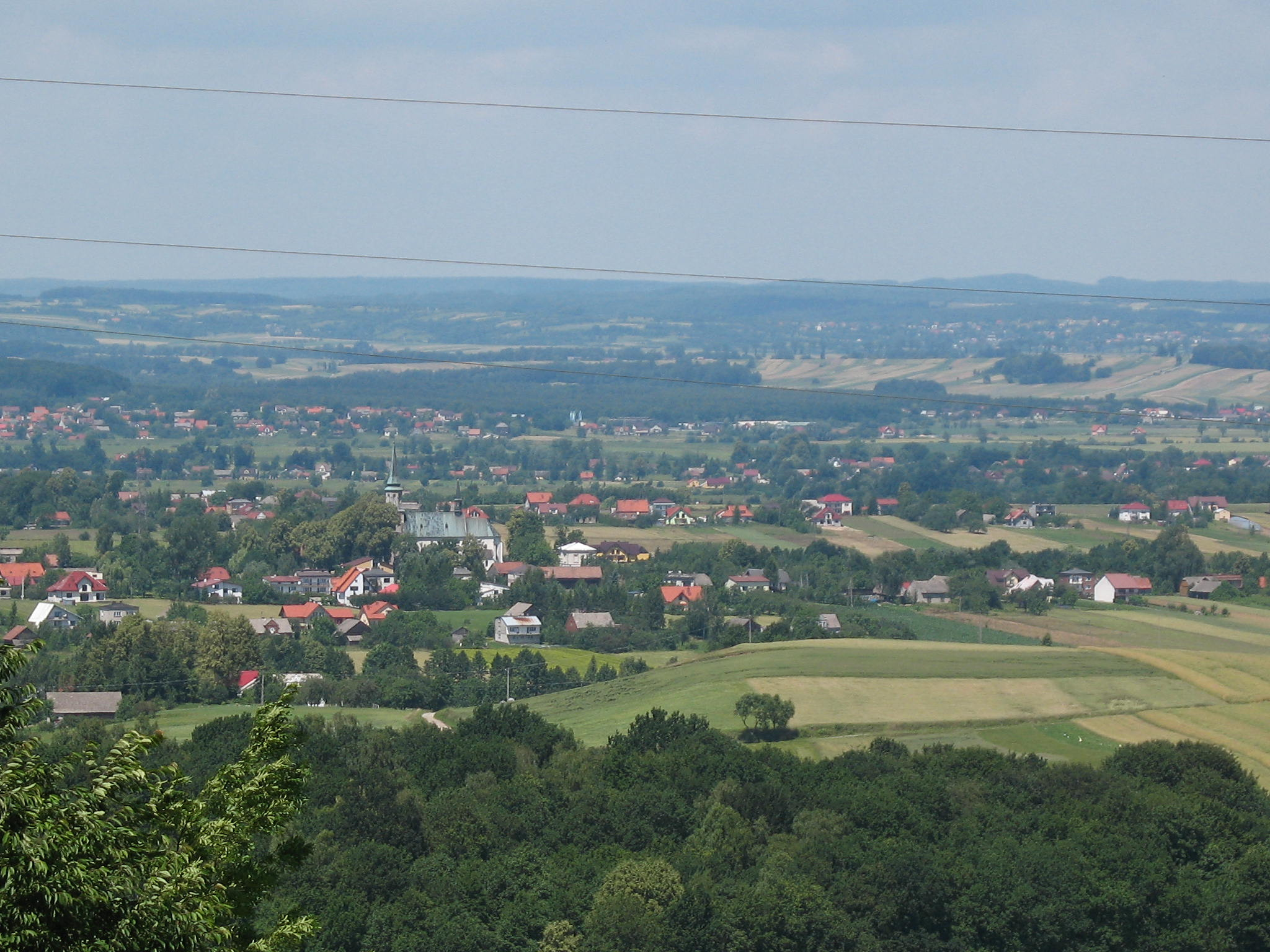

- Location within Poland
- Coordinates: 49°57′N 19°41′E
- Country: Poland
- Voivodeship: Lesser Poland
- County: Wadowice
- Gmina: Brzeźnica
- Elevation: 280 m (920 ft)
- Population (2021): 1,049

Paszkówka [paʂˈkufka] is a village in the administrative district of Gmina Brzeźnica, within Wadowice County, Lesser Poland Voivodeship, in southern Poland. The village is the location of Paszkówka Palace. The population in 2011 was 906, and in 2021 had grown to 1,049.

== History ==
Paszkówka was first mentioned in writing in the 14th century, and was named after the village's owner, a nobleman named 'Paszek.' In the 15th and 16th centuries, the Paszkowcy noble family owned the village, and possessed a manor and chapel where the present Paszkówka Palace built in 1865 sits today. In 1860, the Paszkówka family sold the estate to another nobleman named Leonard Wężyk who built the palace. After farming reforms from the Polish People's Republic following World War II, the palace was first given to a farmer's society, then was turned into a mushroom farm, then a primary school for local students. In 1997, the palace was then sold to Jan and Anna Oleksy, who turned the palace and former school into a luxury hotel.
