= Astronomer Copernicus, or Conversations with God =

1873 painting by Jan Matejko

- Astronom Kopernik, czyli rozmowa z Bogiem (Polish)
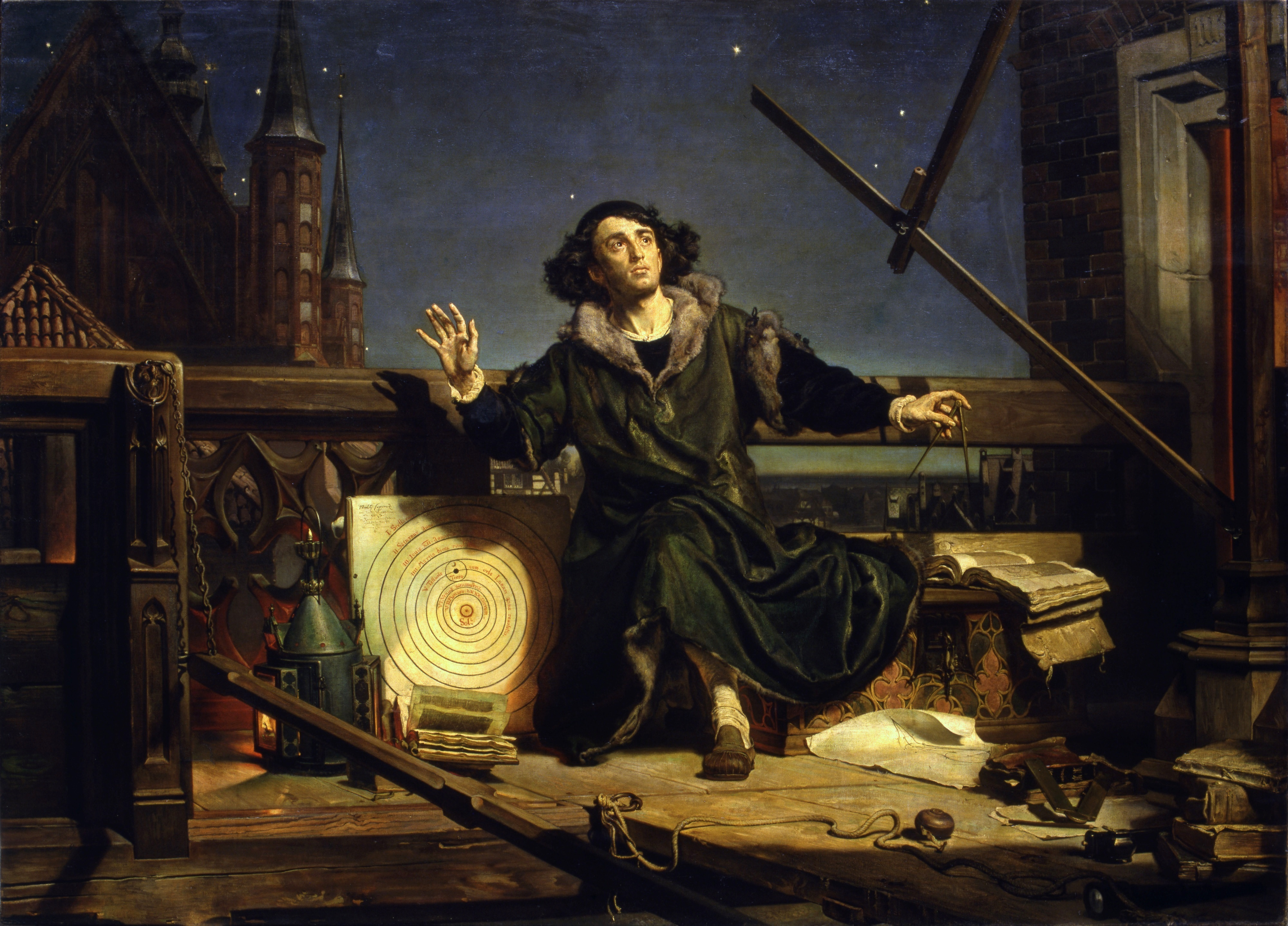
- Artist: Jan Matejko
- Year: 1873
- Medium: oil on canvas
- Dimensions: 225 cm × 315 cm (89 in × 124 in)
- Location: Collegium Novum, Jagiellonian University; Kraków

Astronomer Copernicus, or Conversations with God (Polish: Astronom Kopernik, czyli rozmowa z Bogiem) is a painting by the Polish artist Jan Matejko completed in 1873, in the collection of the Jagiellonian University, in Kraków. It depicts Nicolaus Copernicus observing the heavens from a balcony in a tower with the cathedral in Frombork in the background. The canvas was purchased from a private owner by public subscription in Poland and hangs in the aula (Great Hall) of the Collegium Novum of the university. Matejko produced the painting as part of a series of paintings intended to capture and represent key moments in the history of Poland to inspire the public.

== History ==
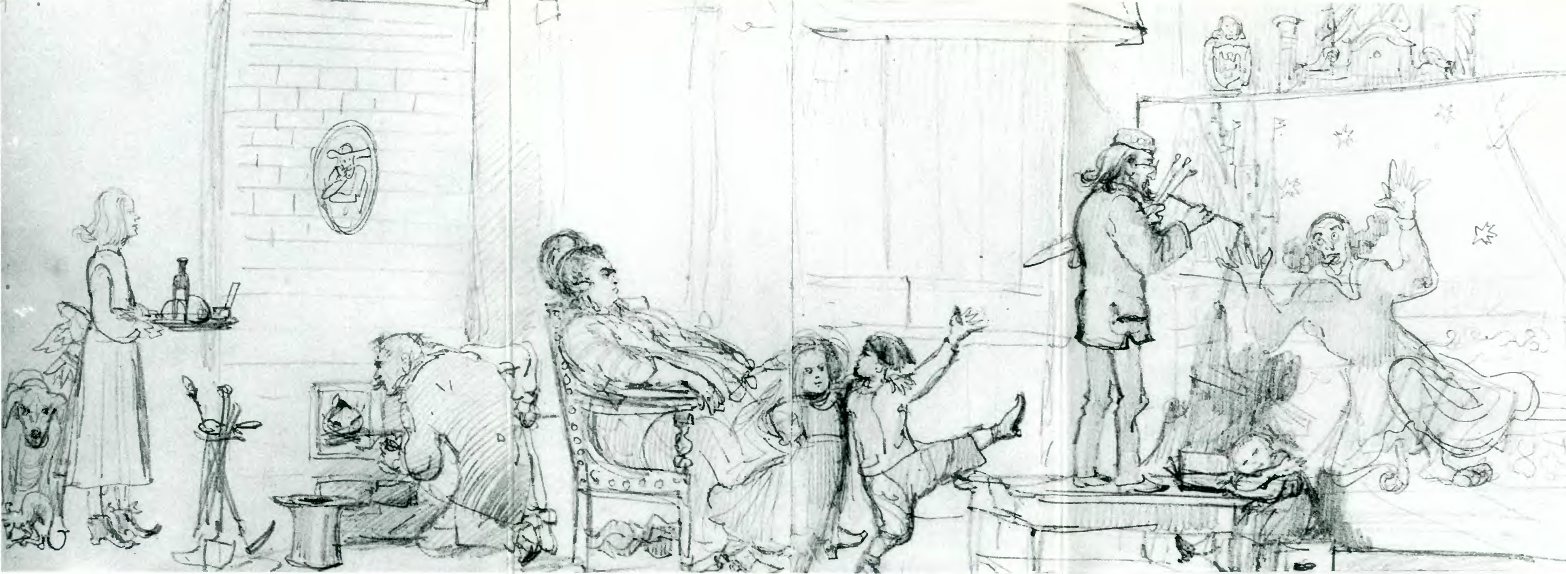
The painting of Copernicus, 1872, Matejko's self-caricatured drawing of his working conditions

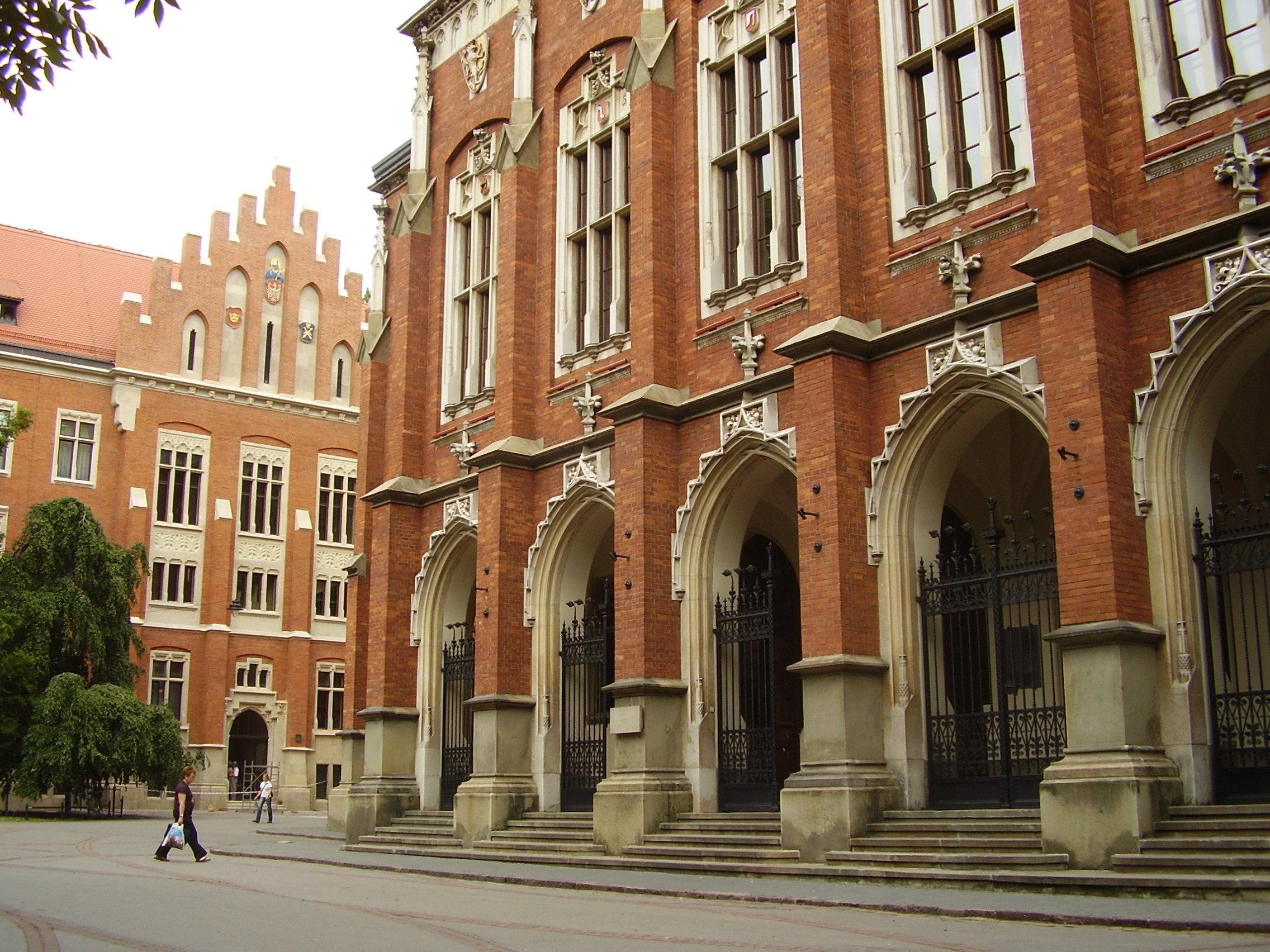
Entrance, right, to the Collegium Novum, Kraków

Matejko began work on this painting in 1871 in preparation for the 400th anniversary of Copernicus's birth. He used research materials available in the Jagiellonian University, and made several preparatory pencil drawings and two oil sketches, prior to executing the painting. He began work on the canvas in the summer of 1872 in the cramped conditions of his old apartment in Kraków. This he recorded in an parodic self-portrait. The definitive work was completed in a new studio in early 1873.

In the event the organizers of Copernicus' quadricentennial anniversary in Kraków were indifferent to Matejko's endeavours, and did not plan to exhibit his painting during the official festivities. Meanwhile, the town council of Toruń, Copernicus' home town then under German rule, approached Matejko with a view to purchasing it. He however refused their offer, possibly out of national pride, and opted instead to organize his own exhibition in Kraków. He was able to exhibit the picture in February 1873, in the Wielopolski Palace, then the Kraków City Council building. Profits from the event were donated to charity. The painting had a mixed reception. Later that year it was shown in Vienna. In March the inhabitants of Kraków decided to buy the painting and raised the necessary 12,000 zlotys, and donated it to the Jagiellonian University. It has been on public display in the university's Collegium Novum ever since.

In May 2021 the painting was loaned by the Jagiellonian University authorities for a period of four months to London's National Gallery for a temporary exhibition and was the first work by any Polish artist to be exhibited there.

== Description ==
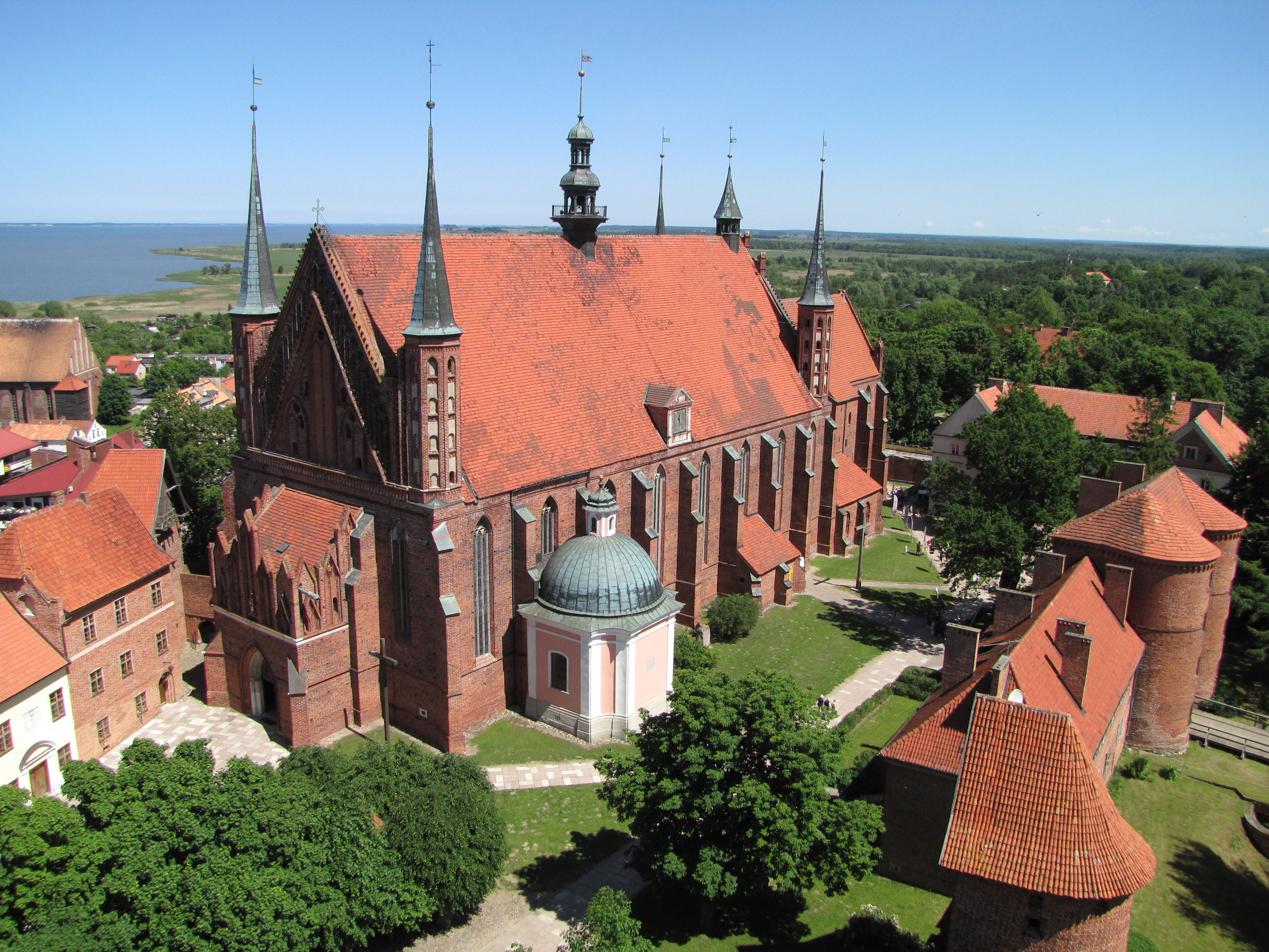
Frombork Cathedral and neighbouring buildings, with Vistula lagoon in the background

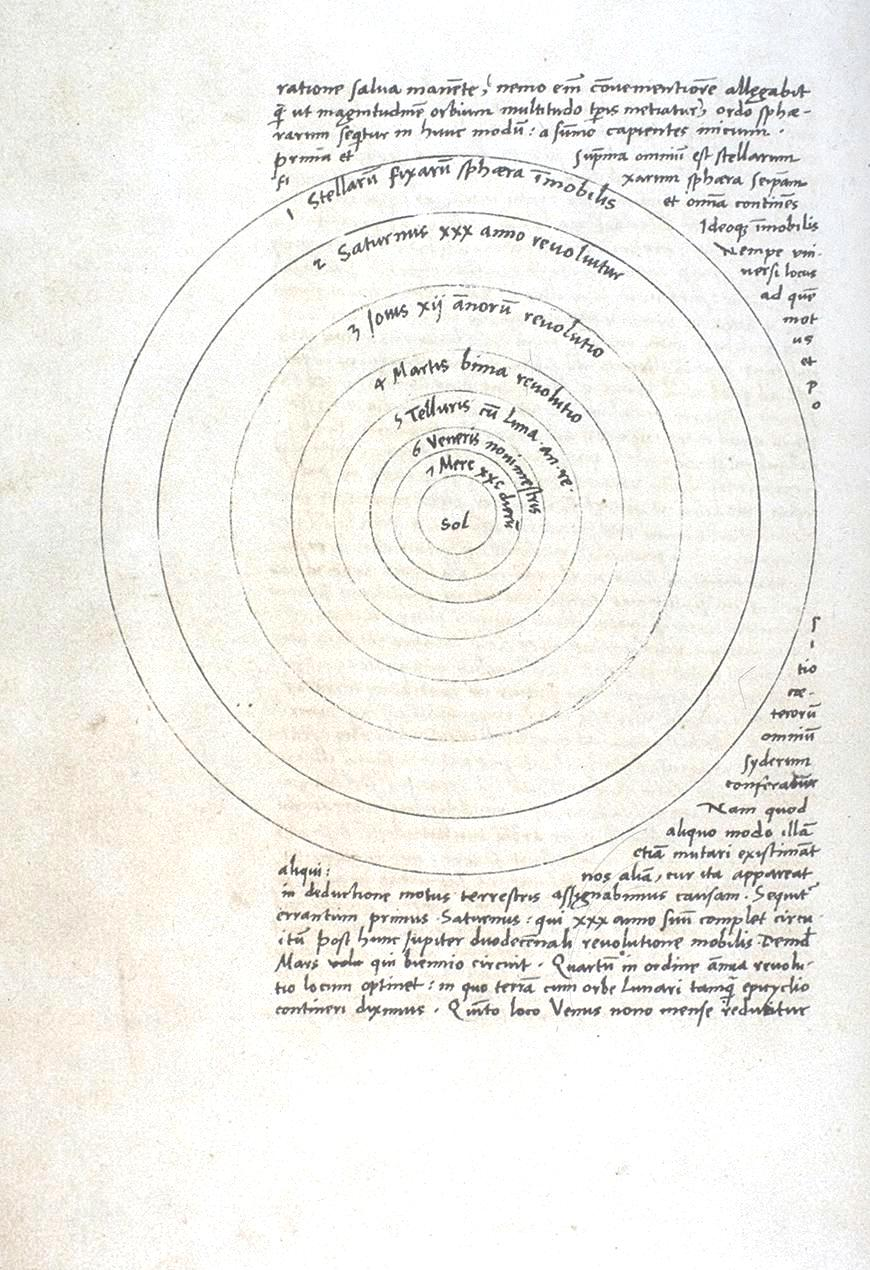
Original manuscript of Copernicus' heliocentric map

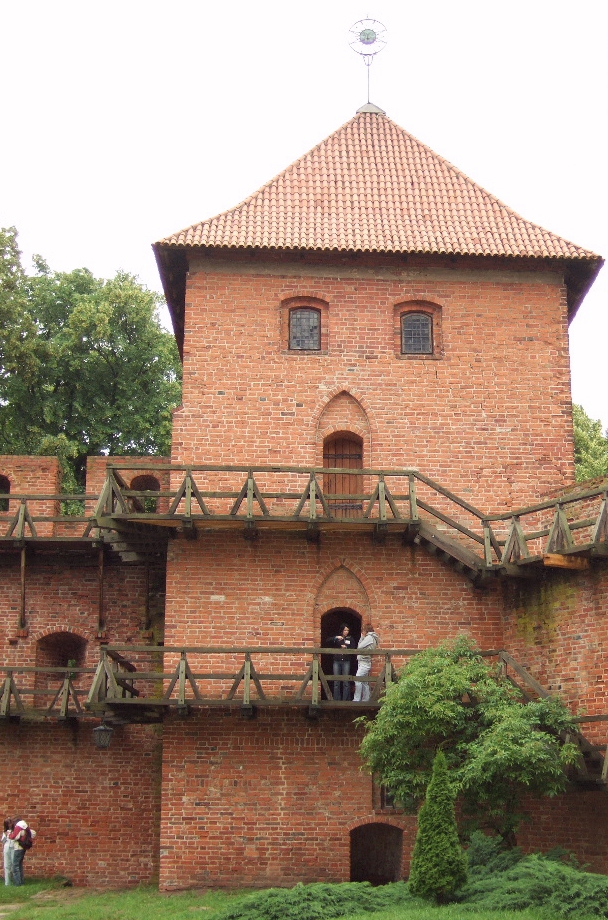
Frombork, Copernicus' Tower and part of the city wall

The painting depicts the exalted cleric and scientist Nicolaus Copernicus—he was a canon of Frombork Cathedral—kneeling as he observes the heavens during the transition from night to dawn. He is high up on a balcony, supposedly in his observatory, near to cathedral in Frombork, surrounded by various astronomical instruments. By his side is his own heliocentric model drawn on a large flat board, based on an actual illustration from his De revolutionibus. The scene likely portrays the moment of revelation when Copernicus becomes convinced of his discovery.

The main features of the composition include 16th-century costume and use of objects as part of a symbolic narrative. There is also the symmetrical focal point with atmospheric perspective around the subject, a radial balance of light arranged around a central element, and dramatic contrasts with dark colours on the periphery. Copernicus's epiphany or ecstasy is captured through the use of quasi stage lighting. Two individuals are known to have served as models for Copernicus. One was Dr. Henryk Levittoux, a medical practitioner and the younger brother of Polish independence activist Karol Levittoux, who died in 1841. The other was Antoni Serafińsk, Matejko's nephew.

== Interpretation ==
The location depicted by Matejko is fictional. Modern scholars are still looking for the exact location of the Copernicus observatory, and agree that Matejko's portrayal was more of a "romantic vision". Whereas Matejko shows Copernicus on top of a tower, in reality his small observatory was probably at ground level, possibly in the garden of his house.

Most of Matejko's notable paintings consist of large group scenes. A scene with a single individual such as this, another being Stańczyk, tends to be exceptional in his oeuvre.

== See also ==
- History painting
- Mannerism
- Northern Renaissance
- Polish positivism
- The Ambassadors (Holbein)
