= Tadeusz Błotnicki =

Polish sculptor (1858–1928)

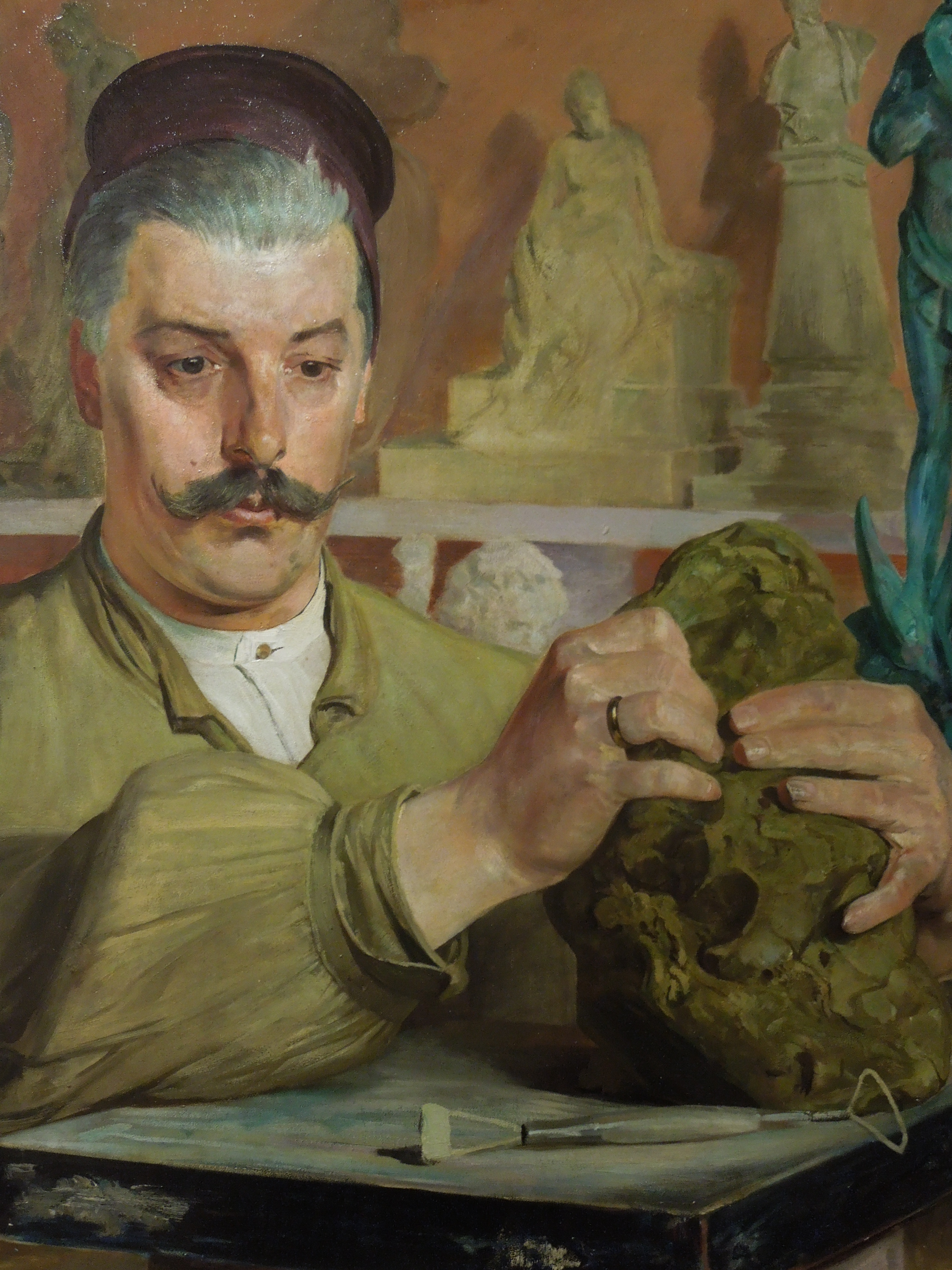
Tadeusz Błotnicki; portrait by Jacek Malczewski

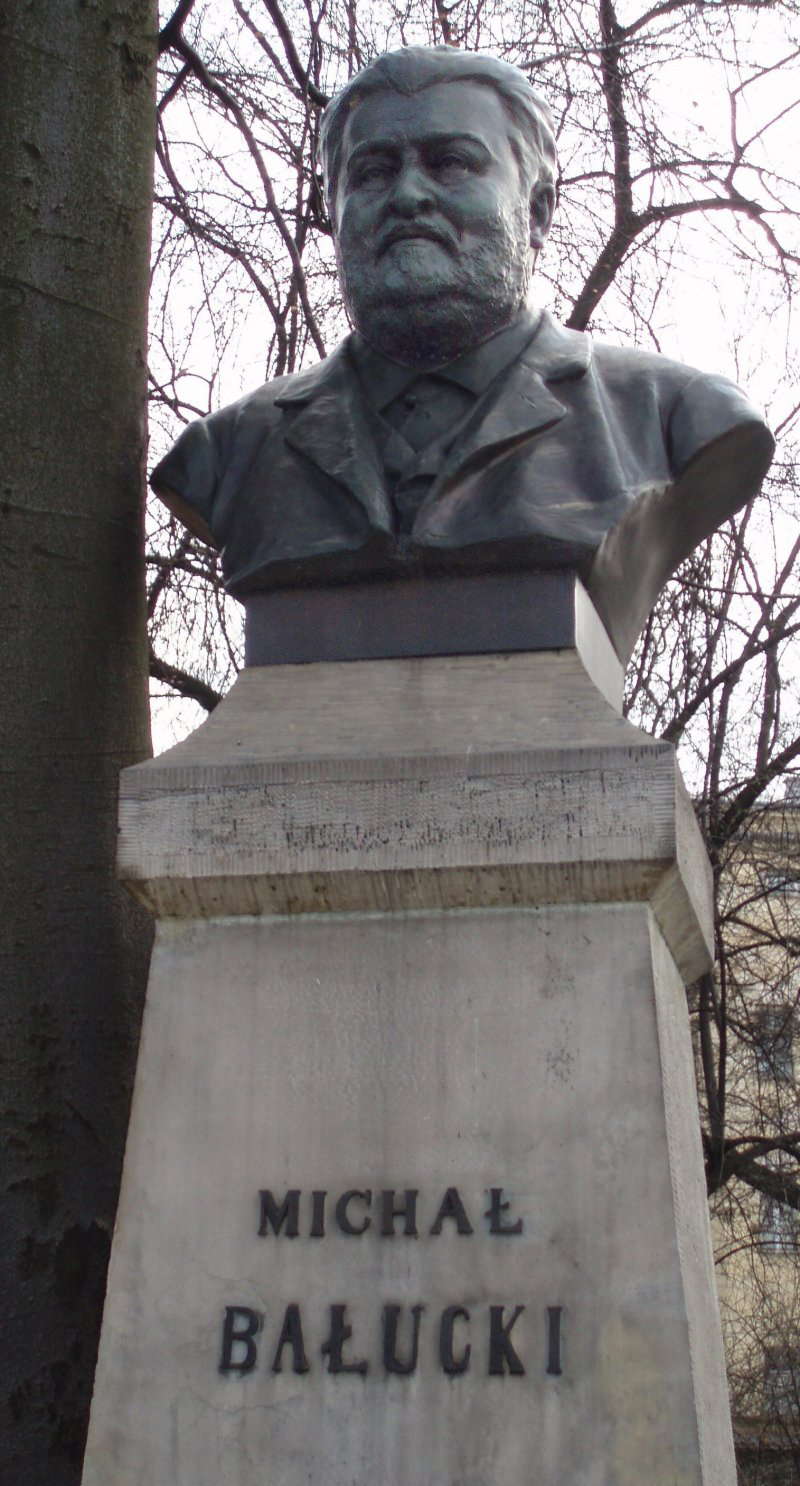
Monument to Michał Bałucki in the Planty from 1911

Tadeusz Błotnicki (8 October 1858, Lwów - 28 March 1928, Kraków) was a Polish sculptor, active mainly in Kraków.

He was a disciple of Parys Filippi, Marcel Guyski, and Kaspar von Zumbusch, from Vienna, and created many sculptures and busts in Cracow and throughout Galicia. He was also a known figure in the artistic spheres of pre-war Cracow and was friends with Gabriela Zapolska, Teofil Lenartowicz and Jacek Malczewski, who painted his portrait.

== Major works ==
- bust of Stanisław Konarski at the entrance to the crypt of the Piarists church and inside the church
- bust of Feliks Księżarski on the Palace of Arts, which can be seen from the Planty, made in 1901
- allegory of Poetry, Drama and Comedy on the facade of the Słowacki Theatre in Cracow
- monument to Marcel Guyski and Oskar Kolberg in the Rakowicki Cemetery
- figure of Saint Joseph in the Capuchins church
- monument to Adam Mickiewicz (1898) in Stanislawow
