= Michał Bałucki =

Polish playwright and poet

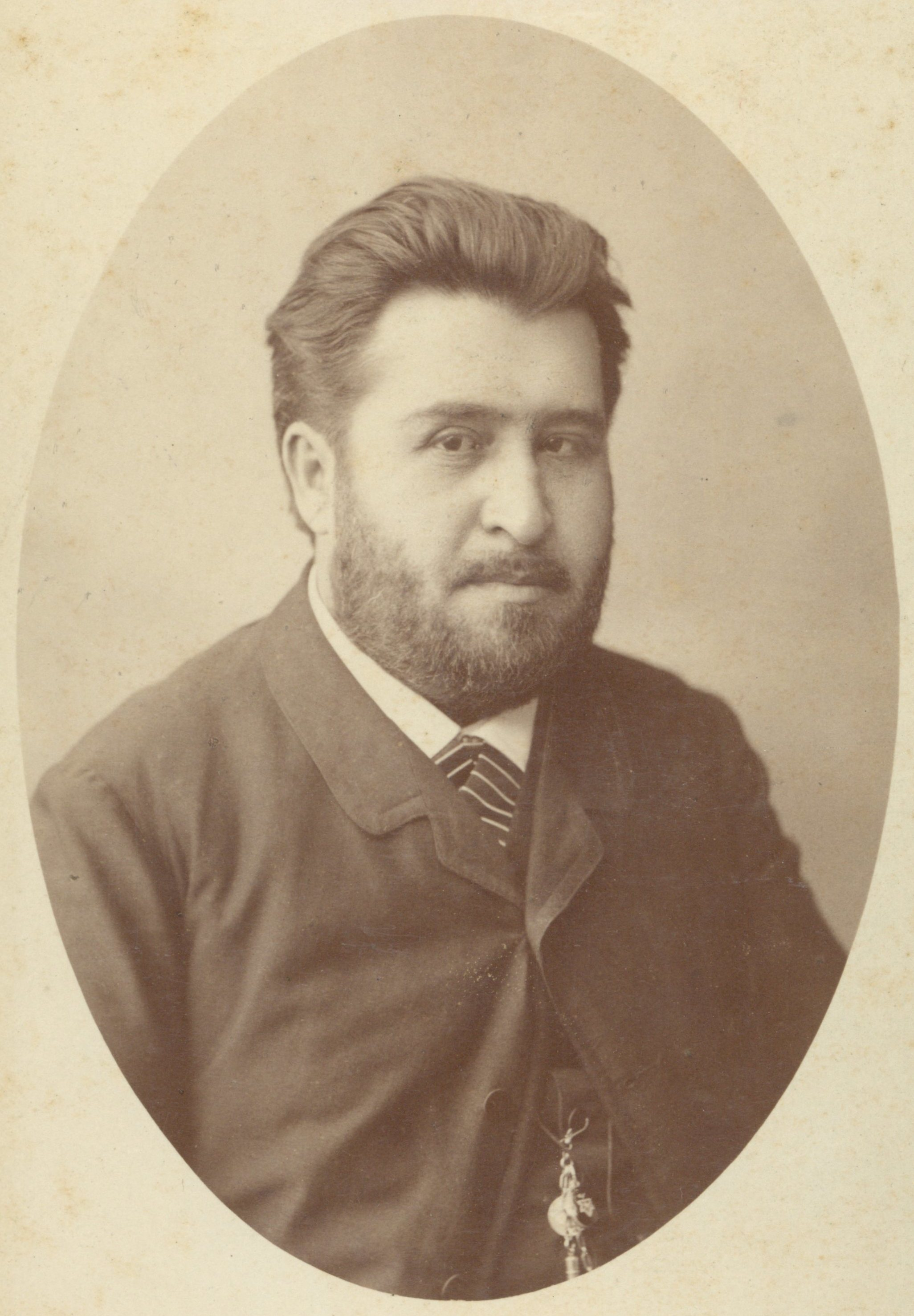
Michał Bałucki

Michał Bałucki, pseudonym Elpidon (29 September 1837 – 17 October 1901), was a Polish playwright and poet.

== Biography ==
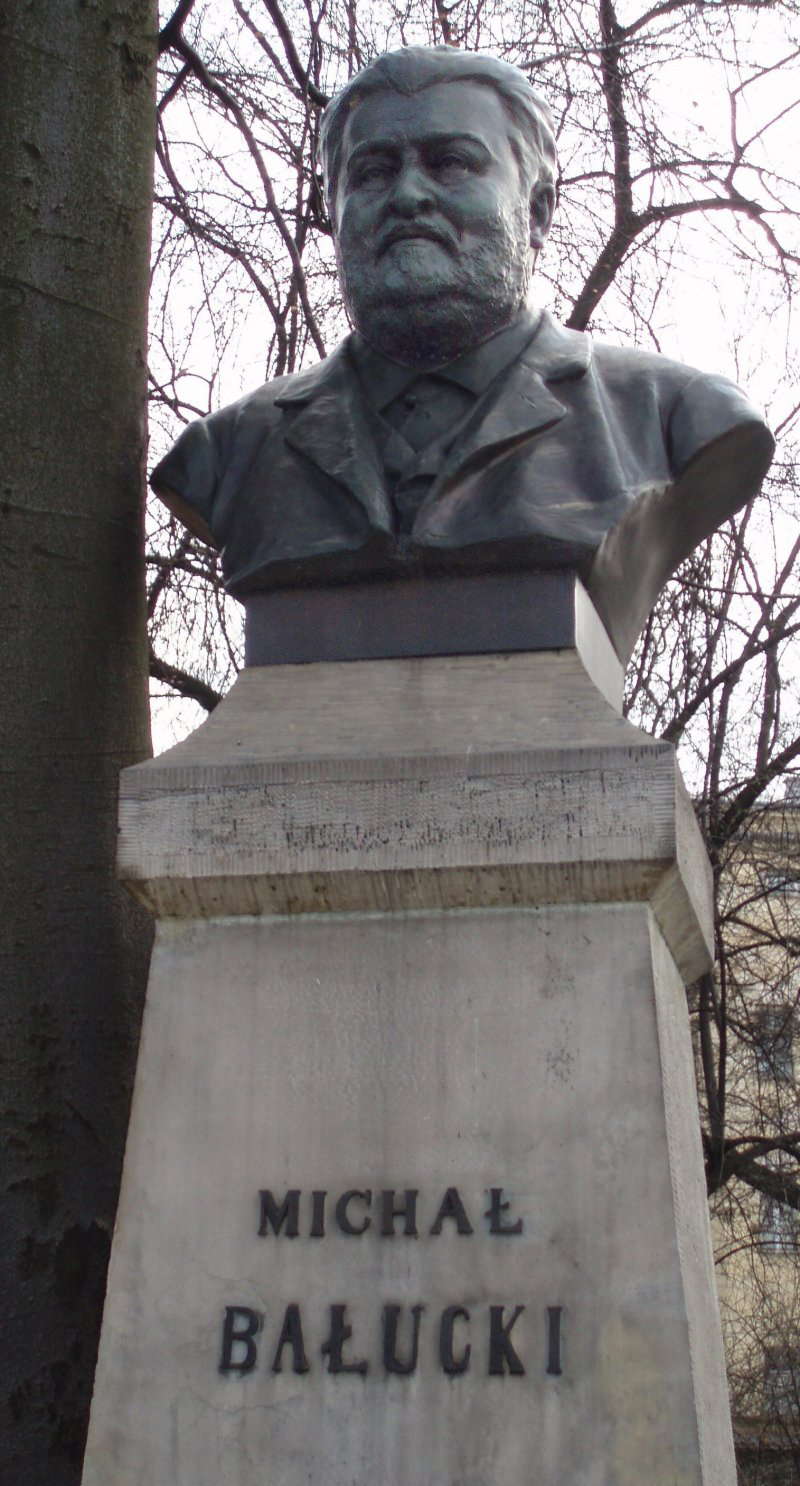
A monument sculpted by Tadeusz Błotnicki and erected in Planty in 1911

Bałucki was born on 29 September 1837 in Kraków. He studied at Saint's Ann gymnasium in Kraków, and then at the Jagiellonian University. He was an active member of a youth organization that wanted to help Poles fighting the tsarist regime in Russian occupied Poland, but he did not fight in the January Uprising. He was sentenced to prison for conspiracy after being arrested at the end of 1863.

He debuted in 1861 with poems based on folklore motifs. In his poems, he attacked Galician aristocrats and the middle class that looked up to them.

At the end of his life he suffered from neurosis and depression and, after a virulently critical article written by Lucjan Rydel, he committed suicide in Błonia Park in Kraków. He died on 17 October 1901.

== Works ==
Novels:

- 1864 Awakening
- 1866 Elders and young
- 1870 Glittering poverty
- 1871 Jewess
- 1872 It is about a piece of land
- 1874 From a camp to a camp
- 1875 White Negro (Biały murzyn)
- 1881 Lordly beggars
- 1881 Kraków's images
- 1885 In Jewish hands
- 1887 The Mayor from Pipidówka

Comedies:

- 1867 Councillor's councillors
- 1871 Hunting a husband
- 1871 Hard-working lazybones
- 1873 Emancipation
- 1879 Cousins
- 1880 Neighbours
- 1881 Big shot
- 1883 Neighbours: Open house
- 1889 Neighbours: Hard times
- 1890 Neighbours: Bachelors' club

== Bibliography ==
- Rosner E., Cieszyńskie okruchy literackie, Cieszyn 1983, pp. 14–16.
- Anna Sobiecka, "Michał Bałucki i teatr: wybrane problemy i aspekty", Słupsk 2006, ISBN 83-7467-046-0
