= Collegium Novum =

Building of the Jagiellonian University in Poland

Jagiellonian University Collegium Novum
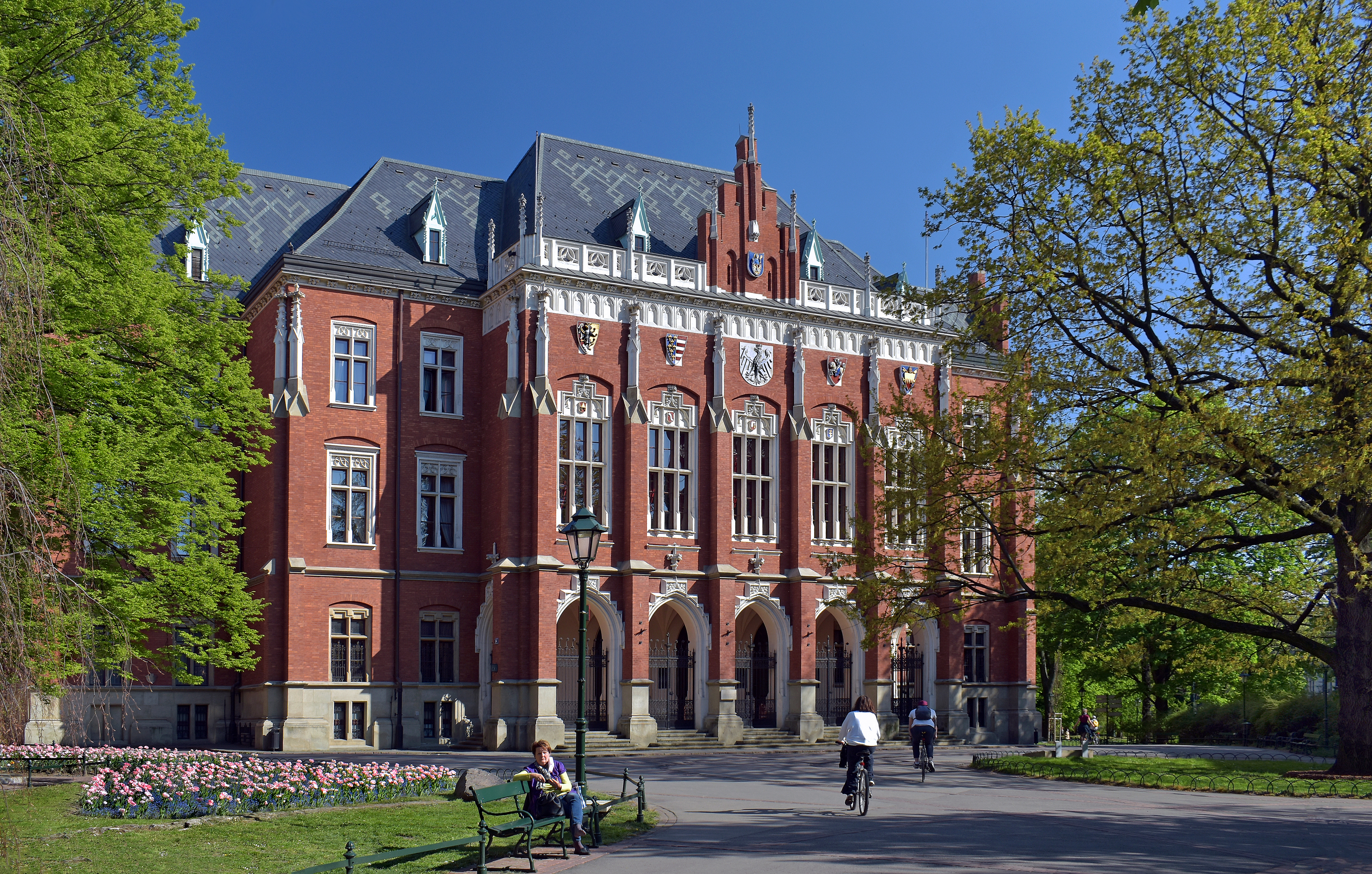
- Interactive map of the Jagiellonian University; Collegium Novum area

General information
- Type: university
- Architectural style: neo-Gothic
- Location: Poland, Kraków; 24 Gołębia Street
- Coordinates: 50°03′39″N 19°55′59″E
- Construction started: 1873
- Completed: 1887

Design and construction
- Architect: Feliks Księżarski

UNESCO World Heritage Site
- Type: Cultural
- Criteria: iv
- Designated: 1978
- Part of: Historic Centre of Kraków
- Reference no.: 29
- Region: Europe and North America

Historic Monument of Poland
- Designated: 1994-09-08
- Part of: Kraków – historic city center
- Reference no.: M.P. 1994 nr 50 poz. 418

The Collegium Novum (Latin: "New College") is the Neo-Gothic historic main building of the Jagiellonian University located at 24 Gołębia Street in the Old Town of Kraków, Poland.

Originally built between the year 1363 and 1365 and after its destruction, rebuilt in between 1873 and 1887. Based on a design by architect Feliks Księżarski to match the oldest building of the university, it was opened for the 500th anniversary of the university's foundation. The Collegium Novum replaced a former academic boarding school called Jeruzalem, consumed by fire in the mid-19th century.

The building contains lecture rooms including an impressive assembly hall (called Aula), Rector's, Deans', and other university authorities' offices as well as those of a number of prominent professors. It is the Jagiellonian University's administrative centre.

== History ==
Collegium Novum was opened on June 14, 1887, commencing several years of debate and construction. The decision regarding the allocation of subsidies was made in the Austro-Hungarian capital of Vienna, with the university's vital interests defended by Julian Dunajewski, the then Austrian Finance Minister. The work might not have begun at all had it not been for his commitment, as well as that of his brother Cardinal Albin Dunajewski.

Already at the time of its grand opening, the assembly hall (Aula) of the new building was too small to accommodate all guests on all occasions, even though the number of students did not exceed 1200 with approximately one hundred professors. A debate arose whether it was necessary to invite professors' wives to grand ceremonies. Most academics, in keeping with the prevailing trend of the time, were against the inviting of women guests. In the university's archives there is a formal invitation reading: “Zoll requires no ticket and wishes the ceremony to be exclusively male.” In another statement, Edward Janczewski “expresses his opposition to the idea of admitting ladies to the ceremonies.”

Until the end of First World War, a portrait of emperor Franz Joseph I of Austria, painted by Kazimierz Pochwalski, hung in the Aula of the Collegium. On October 31, 1918, a group of university students tore it to pieces, manifesting their determination for the recreation of an independent Republic of Poland. However, a number of other paintings did survive, including portraits of the university's founding fathers Casimir the Great and Władysław Jagiełło dating back to the early 1860s, a picture of Queen Jadwiga painted in 1900 to celebrate her Jubilee, as well as the works of Jan Matejko, including his painting entitled Copernicus: Conversation with God. The chairs in the assembly hall were designed by Tadeusz Stryjeński.

On the upper floor of the college there is a lecture hall named after Józef Szujski – now used by historians – with the commemorative plaque in remembrance of the events surrounding Nazi German action called Sonderaktion Krakau where 183 professors were arrested and later sent to camps in Sachsenhausen and Dachau. The plaque reads: "For the freedom of spirit and service to science and nation of Jagiellonian University professors deceitfully and forcefully taken away from this hall and imprisoned by the Nazi occupant on November 6, 1939."

The restoration of the Neo-Gothic architectural structure took place at the end of the 20th century. It was faced with a number of challenges, notably the task of reviving the original form of the building while simultaneously improving its functionality as an educational facility. The restoration was carried out on its façade in 1994 along with the modernization of the assembly hall, which was completed in 1999. The collaboration of specialists from various disciplines allowed for both restoration and functional needs of the Collegium to be met successfully.

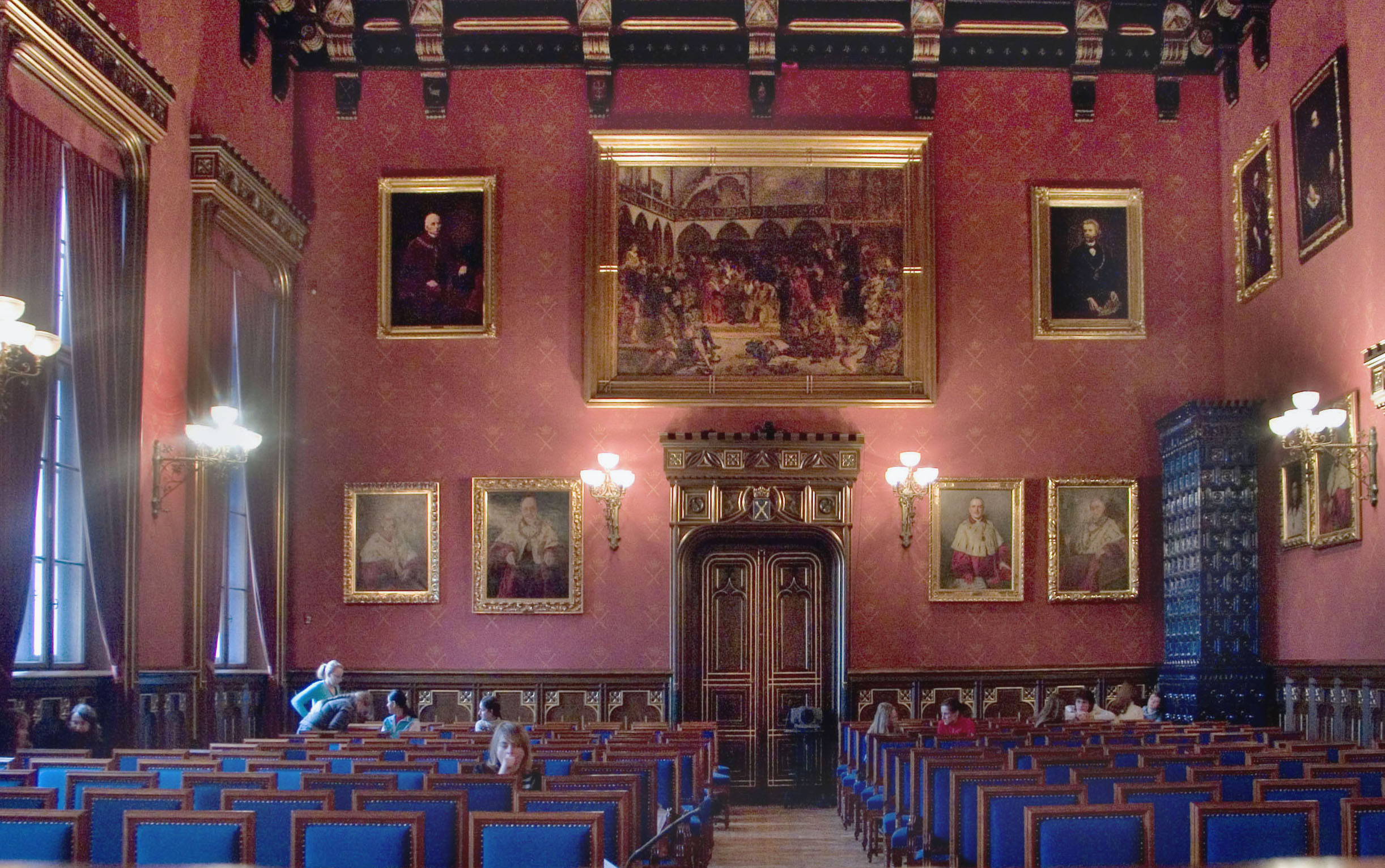
Aula (Assembly hall)

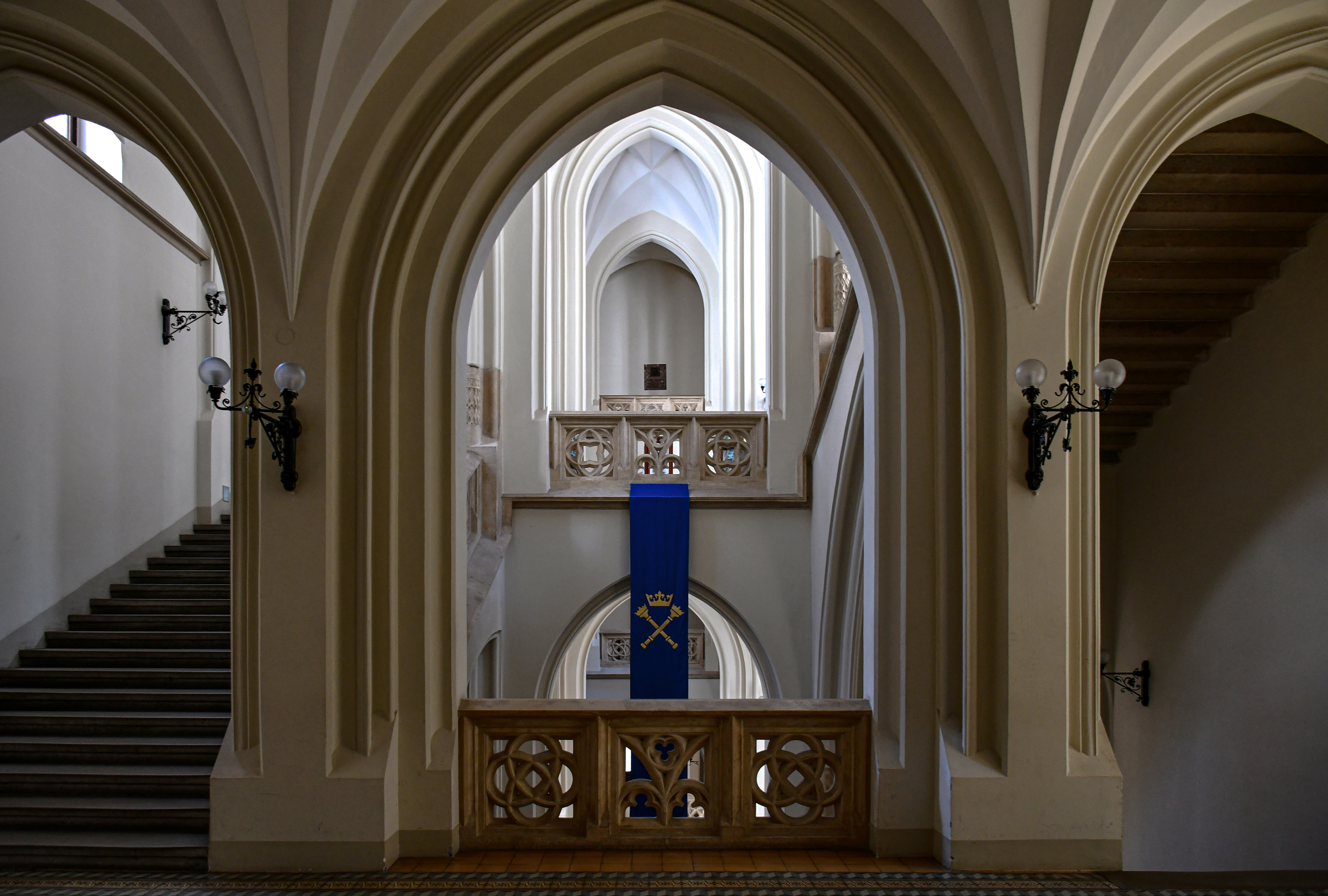
Interior of the building

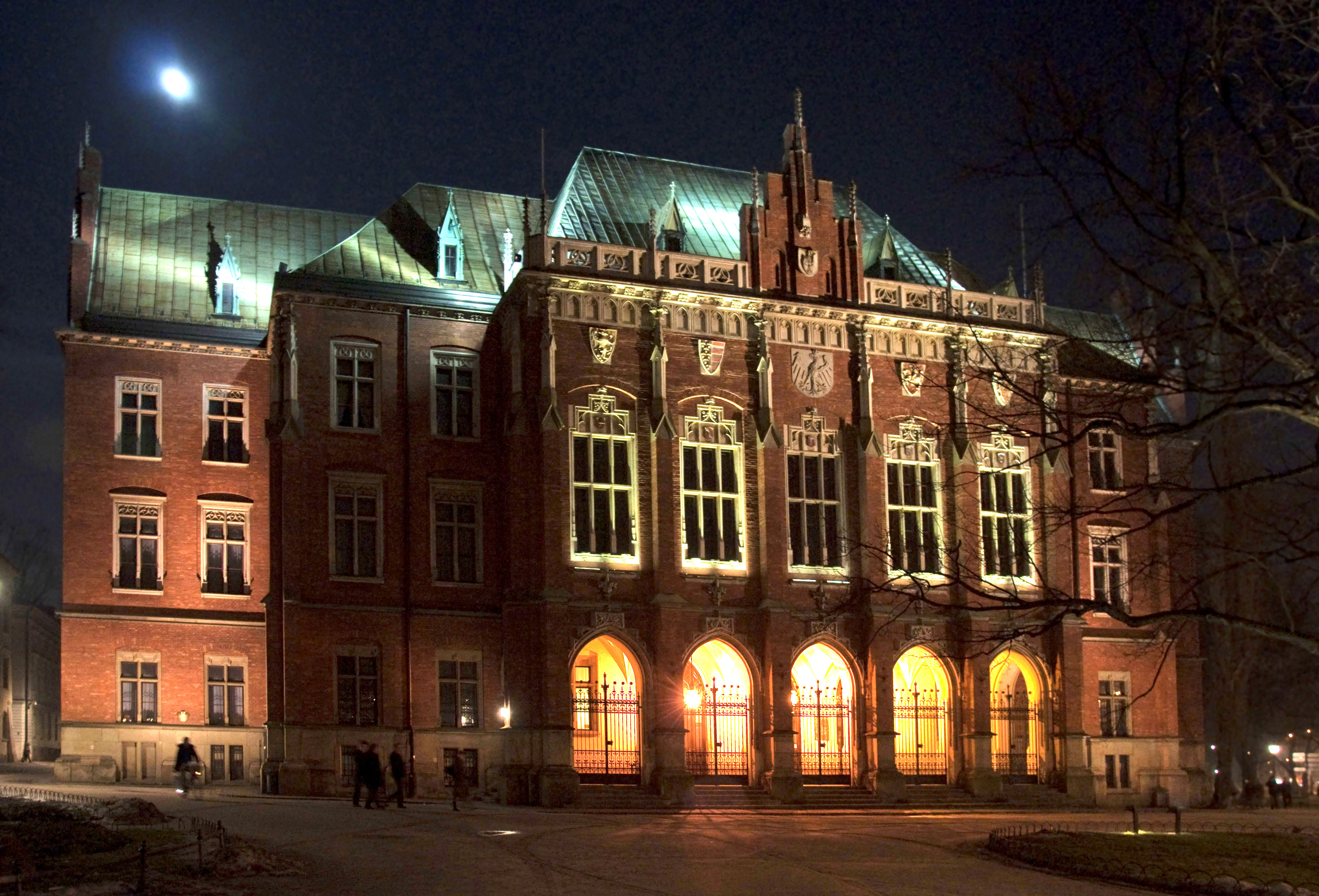
Night illumination of Collegium Novum

== See also ==
- German AB Action operation in Poland during World War II
