= Parys Filippi =

Polish sculptor (1836–1874)

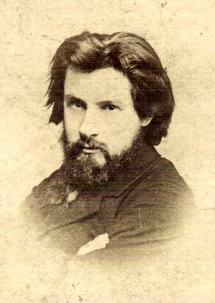
Parys Filippi (c. 1870)

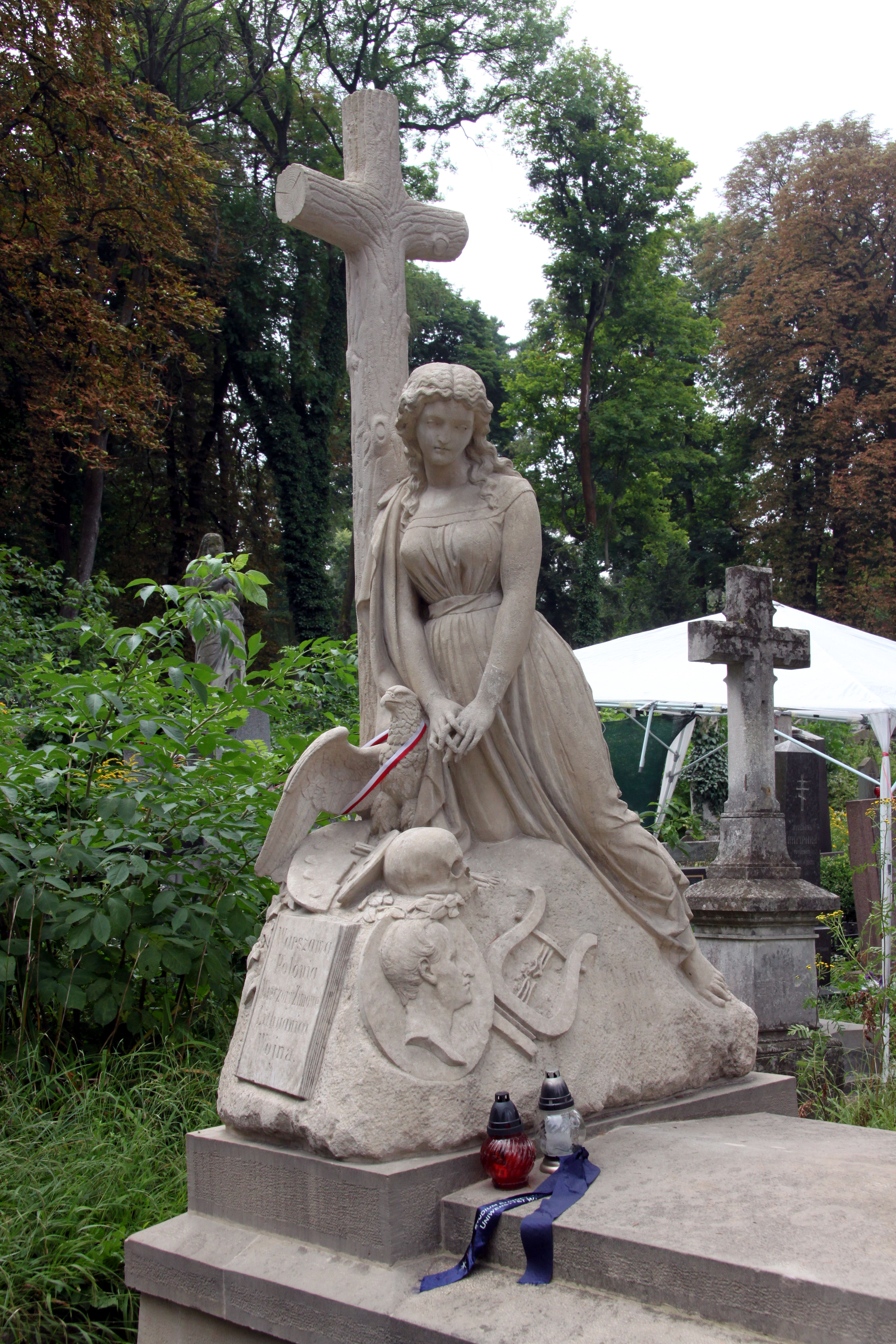
The tomb of Artur Grottger

Parys Filippi (1836, Kraków - 7 December 1874, Warsaw) was a Polish sculptor. His father was an Italian sculptor and stuccoist named Paolo Filippi.

== Biography ==
He received his first lessons from his father. Then, from 1855 to 1858, he studied at the School of Fine Arts, under the direction of Henryk Kossowski. After receiving a scholarship from the city of Kraków, he went to study at the Academy of Fine Arts Munich. When he returned home, he opened a sculpture studio in the refectory of the Church of St. Francis of Assisi. which became a popular meeting place for many of the city's young artists, including Jan Matejko. Later, it would become involved with those planning the January Uprising.

During these years, he created numerous small to medium projects for the local churches and nobility, including series of busts for the Potocki and Sapieha families, as well as busts of nine Polish kings, based on their tombstones. After the uprising had been quashed, he restored the 18th century tomb of Cardinal Jan Aleksander Lipski and completed the tombstone for General Jan Zygmunt Skrzynecki that had been left unfinished by Władysław Oleszczyński.

In 1866, he moved to Lwów, where he opened a studio and gave lessons. As before, his studio became a meeting place for many young artists and intellectuals, including the sculptors Tadeusz Błotnicki, Antoni Kurzawa and Tadeusz Barącz. In 1867, he became a member of the "Society of Friends of the Fine Arts". During these years, he focused on creating busts and portrait medallions of notable people. Plaster casts of the medallions were very popular. He also created a few tombstones for Łyczakow Cemetery; notably that of Artur Grottger. In addition, he was involved in several major conservation and restoration projects.

Having long suffered from alcoholism, he became severely depressed and committed suicide, while away from home, performing conservation work in Warsaw. He left behind a pregnant widow and three children.

Many of his works were stolen from their owners during World War II. Those that have been recovered are on display at the Lviv National Art Gallery.
