= Mieczysław Romanowski =

Polish Romantic poet

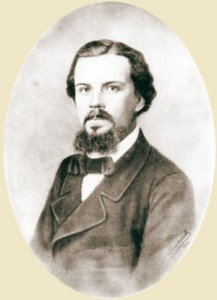
Mieczysław Romanowski

Mieczysław Romanowski (1833–1863) was a Polish Romantic poet.

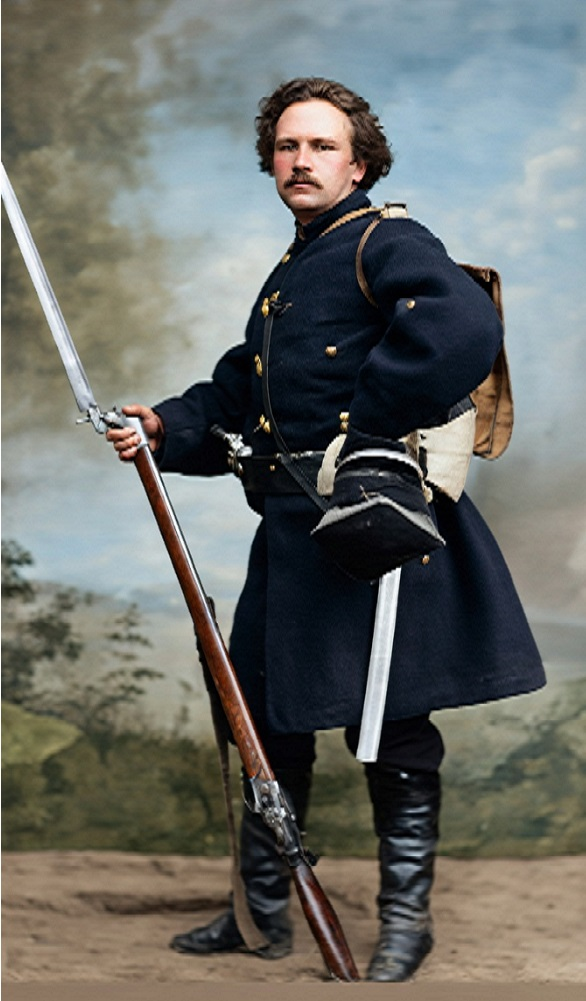
Romanowski in military gear

== Biography ==
Romanowski was born in Żukow (today Zhukiv), near Obertyn, Austrian Poland on 12 April 1833. He attended gymnasium in Stanisławów (now Ivano-Frankivsk), then studied law at the University of Lviv (1853-1857). He became an employee of the Ossolineum in 1860 where he taught and worked on his writings. He was a part of a group of progressive intellectuals, united around the Lviv newspaper Dziennik Literacki ("The literary magazine") which continued the traditions of revolutionary romanticism. He also wrote articles for magazines Nowiny ("News"), "Literary Magazine," and Dzwonek ("The Bells"), a "magazine for the people".

From 1862 he was involved in the underground resistance movement. He was arrested in February 1863 by the Austrian authorities for his activities among the youth of Lviv. After his release he joined the January Uprising and was appointed to the rank of captain and adjutant commander of the division commanded by Marcin Borel "Lelewel". Romanowski was killed during a skirmish with Russian forces at Józefów, Lublin Voivodeship, on 24 April 1863. He was probably buried in the parish cemetery there along with the other insurgents who were killed.

He was a close friend of Henry Stroka.

== Works ==
He made his debut in 1854 with "Chorąży" published in Nowinach. Many of his works were historical epics, but his poetry mirrored his political views. These works presented the patriotic struggle of the bourgeois and plebeian, instead of the contemporary Polish practice of focusing on the noble tradition. His most popular work was his poem "Dziewczę z Sącza" about the resistance of the inhabitants of Nowy Sacz against the Swedes in 1655. Other works in historical settings included the overthrow by the commoners of the bad prince Popiel in his play "Popiel i Piast". His works of patriotic poetry included "Hymn Polski", "Sen króla Jagiełły pod Tannebergiem", "Sztandary polskie w Kremlu", and "Uczta Geronowa".

== Selected works ==
- Chorąży ("Ensign", 1854)
- Łużeccy (1856)
- Dziewczę z Sącza ("Girl from Sacz", poem, 1861)
- Popiel i Piast (play, 1862)
