= Władysław Łuszczkiewicz =

Polish painter (1828–1900)

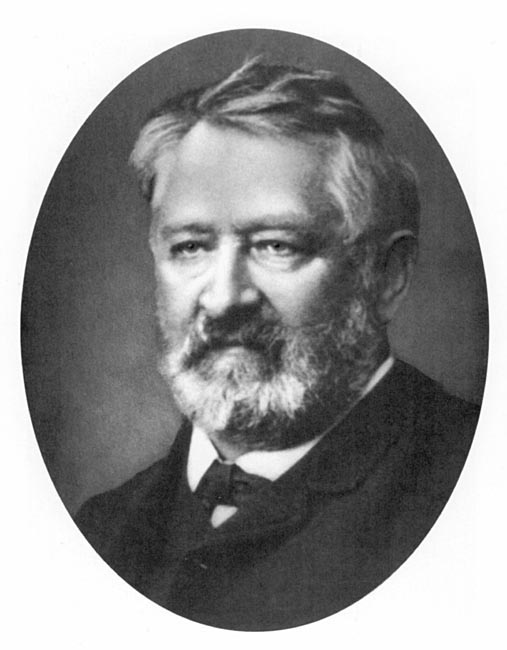
- Born: 3 September 1828; Kraków, Poland
- Died: 23 May 1900 (aged 71); Kraków
- Education: École des Beaux-Arts
- Known for: Painting, art history
- Movement: Realism

Władysław Łuszczkiewicz (3 September 1828 – 23 May 1900) was a Polish historian and painter of the late Romantic era from Kraków, active in the period of the foreign partitions of Poland. He was a professor at the Academy of Fine Arts and served as its principal in 1893/95. One of his best students was Jan Matejko, the eminent Polish historical painter and later, his close associate. Łuszczkiewicz taught painting, drawing, anatomy and architectural styles. Highly educated, he also worked as conservator of architectural monuments in the city later on in his career, and wrote historical dissertations.

== Life ==
Władysław Łuszczkiewicz was born in Kraków in 1828 and after graduating from St Anne High School (where his father Michał of the Rola coat of arms was a professor), he enrolled at the Department of History of the Jagiellonian University. At the same time, he began to study painting at the School of Fine Arts with Wojciech Stattler and Jan Nepomucen Głowacki. His talent was rewarded with a scholarship which enabled Łuszczkiewicz to continue his studies at the École des Beaux-Arts in Paris from 1849. While in France, he also developed his lifelong interest in historicism.

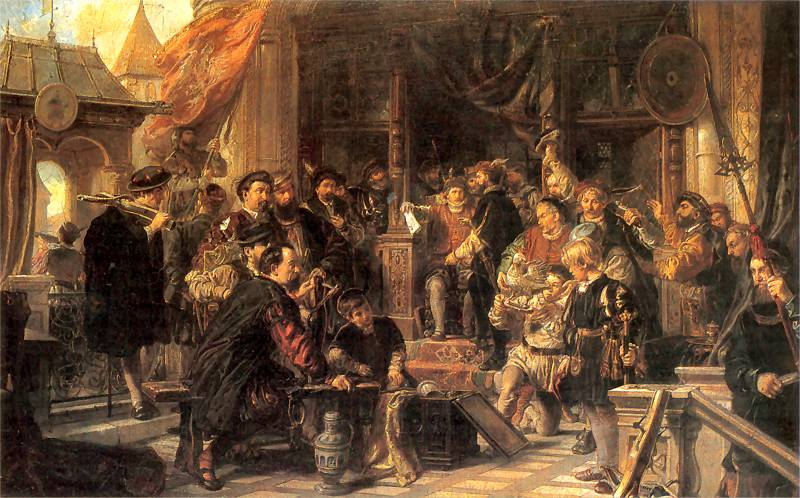
Gifting the Silver Fowler to the Kraków Fowler Brotherhood, 1873, oil on canvas at the National Museum, Kraków

Łuszczkiewicz began to teach art while still a student himself. His beloved Kraków was under the military rule of Austria-Hungary, and all fields of education were grossly neglected. He often gave private art classes for free to struggling artists. Łuszczkiewicz was nominated as professor at the Academy in 1877. Among his students (aside from Matejko) were the future luminaries of Polish art of the turn-of-the-century including Artur Grottger, Aleksander Kotsis, Józef Mehoffer, Jacek Malczewski, Stanisław Wyspiański and Wojciech Weiss. He introduced them to plein-air painting by organizing trips to places of historical significance outside the city.

In 1883 he was chosen as director of the National Museum in Kraków. In 1886 he and curator Teodor Nieczuja-Ziemięcki entered Konstanty Schmidt-Ciążyński's engraved gem collection into the inventory of the National Museum. In 1893/95 he served as rector of the Academy of Fine Arts. His own historical paintings filled with knowledge of period artifacts and costume, were a great source of inspiration for Jan Matejko. (Note: " ... obrazy zafascynowanego wydarzeniami minionych dziejów artysty stanowiły niewyczerpane źródło inspiracji dla jednego z najsłynniejszych uczniów pedagoga – Jana Matejki" (English: the paintings of an artist fascinated with events of past centuries served as unending source of inspiration for one of his most famous students – Jan Matejko). — Nina Kinitz, 2009; § 5.) They often came into being as pictorial representations of his scientific discoveries and literature on the subject. He stopped painting towards the end of his life and turned entirely to writing and art conservation advocacy. In recognition of his work, Łuszczkiewicz was awarded the title of doctor honoris causa of the Jagiellonian University in 1900, and died in Kraków prior to award ceremony in the same year. He was married to Malwina Ramloff (1858) and had four children: Napoleon, Zofia, Wojciech Józef, and Maria.

== Sources ==
- Maria Rzepińska (1983), Władysław Łuszczkiewicz, malarz i pedagog, Wydawn. Literackie, 125 pages, ISBN 8308010776
- Władysław Łuszczkiewicz (1899), Sukiennice Krakowskie: dzieje gmachu i jego obecnej przebudowy, Drukarnia "Czasu". Issue 11 of Biblioteka krakowska
- Stefania Krzysztofowicz-Kozakowska, Franciszek Stolot. Historia malarstwa polskiego. Wydawnictwo Ryszard Kluszczyński. Kraków 2000.
- Anna Lewicka-Morawska, Marek Machowski, Maria Anna Rudzka. Slownik malarzy polskich. Wydawnictwo ARKADY. Warszawa 2003.
- Stefania Krzysztofowicz-Kozakowska. Malarstwo polskie w zbiorach za granicą. Wydawnictwo Ryszard Kluszczyński. Kraków.
